= List of endangered languages in Nepal =

Language Endangerment Status by UNESCO Atlas of the World's Languages in Danger category

Extinct (EX)
- Extinct (EX): (lists)

Endangered
- Critically Endangered (CR); Severely Endangered (SE); Definitely Endangered (DE); Vulnerable (VU): (list); (list); (list); (list)

Safe
- Safe (NE): no list
- Other categories
- Revived (RE); Constructed (CL): (list); (list)
- Related topics: Atlas of the World's Languages in Danger; Endangered Languages Project; Ethnologue; Unclassified language; List of languages by total number of speakers
- UNESCO Atlas of the World's; Languages in Danger categories

An endangered language is a language that it is at risk of falling out of use, generally because it has few surviving speakers. If it loses all of its native speakers, it becomes an extinct language. UNESCO defines four levels of language endangerment between "safe" (not endangered) and "extinct":

- Vulnerable
- Definitely endangered
- Severely endangered
- Critically endangered

The languages listed below are endangered in Nepal, although they may be vibrant in other countries.

Language	Speakers	Status	Comments
Athpare	5,500	Definitely endangered	
Bahing	11,600	Definitely endangered	
Bantawa	132,600	Vulnerable	
Baram	155	Critically endangered	
Bote-Darai	11,700	Severely endangered	
Chamling	76,800	Definitely endangered	
Chantyal	4,300	Definitely endangered	
Chepang	48,500	Vulnerable	
Chintang	3,700	Severely endangered	
Chulung	2,000	Definitely endangered	
Danuwar	45,800	Severely endangered	
Dhimal	19,300	Severely endangered	
Dol-po	1,700	Definitely endangered	
Dumi	650	Critically endangered	
Dungmali	6,300	Definitely endangered	
Ghale	8,100	Vulnerable	
Gurung	325,600	Definitely endangered	
Gyasumdo	390	Definitely endangered	
Ha-lung Tibetan		Definitely endangered	
Vayu	1,500	Critically endangered	
Jerung	1,700	Vulnerable	
Jirel	4,800	Definitely endangered	
Kagate	99	Definitely endangered	
Kaike	50	Definitely endangered	
Khaccaḍ Bhoṭe		Definitely endangered	
Khaling	14,500	Definitely endangered	
Kham	27,100	Definitely endangered	
Kohi	1,300	Vulnerable	
Kulung	33,200	Vulnerable	
Kumhali	12,200	Severely endangered	
Kurux	33,700	Vulnerable	
Kusunda	87	Critically endangered	
Langthang Tibetan		Definitely endangered	
Limirong Tibetan		Definitely endangered	
Lohorung	3,700	Severely endangered	
Loke Tibetan		Definitely endangered	
Magar	788,500	Definitely endangered	
Majhi	24,400	Severely endangered	
Mewahang	4,700	Severely endangered	
Nachhiring	284	Severely endangered	
Nar Phu	600	Definitely endangered	
Newar (Nepal Bhasa)	846,600	Definitely endangered	
Nubri		Definitely endangered	
Nyishangba		Definitely endangered	
Puma	6,700	Severely endangered	
Raji	3,800	Severely endangered	
Raute	461	Severely endangered	
Sām	401	Severely endangered	
Sampang	18,300	Vulnerable	
Santali	49,900	Vulnerable	
Seke		Vulnerable	
Sunwar	37,900	Vulnerable	
Surel	287	Critically endangered	
Thakali	5,200	Vulnerable	
Thangmi	23,200	Definitely endangered	
Thulung	20,700	Definitely endangered	
Tilung	1,400	Definitely endangered	
Tsum		Definitely endangered	
Wambule	13,500	Vulnerable	
Yakkha	19,600	Critically endangered	
Yamphu	9,200	Definitely endangered	
