= Himalayan Languages Project =

Research collective based on languages spoken in Himalayas

The Himalayan Languages Project, launched in 1993, is a research collective based at Leiden University and comprising much of the world's authoritative research on the lesser-known and endangered languages of the Himalayas, in Nepal, China, Bhutan, and India. Its members regularly spend months or years at a time doing field research with native speakers. The Director of the Himalayan Languages Project is George van Driem. Project members include Mark Turin and Jeroen Wiedenhof. The project recruits graduate students to collect field data on little-known languages for their Ph.D. dissertations.

The Himalayan Languages Project was officially commissioned by the government of Bhutan to devise a standard romanization of Dzongkha.

Since George van Driem's move to the University of Bern, many members of the Himalayan Languages Project are now based out of Switzerland.

== Languages studied ==
The project has completed comprehensive grammars of the following languages:

- Limbu
- Dumi
- Dzongkha
- Wambule
- Kulung
- Jero

The project is currently working on comprehensive grammars of the following languages:

- Manchad
- Lohorung
- Thangmi
- Sunwar
- Lhokpu
- Sampang
- Gongduk
- Olekha
- Gyalrong
- Lepcha
- Chulung
- Dhimal

The project has completed grammatical sketches of the following languages:

- Bumthang
- Byangsi
- Puma
- Rabha
- Rongpo

Members of the project are currently working on grammatical sketches of the following languages:

- Baram
- Dura
- Toto

The project has also studied Kusunda, a language isolate of Nepal.

== Himalayan Languages Symposium ==
Members of the Himalayan Languages Project also regularly organise the Himalayan Languages Symposium, an annual conference on Trans-Himalayan languages. Conferences have been held annually since 1995.

Below is a list of past conferences.

Event	Location	Country	Date	Year
HLS 1	Leiden	Netherlands	June 16–17	1995
HLS 2	Noordwijkerhout	Netherlands	October 11–12	1996
HLS 3	Santa Barbara, California	United States	July 17–20	1997
HLS 4	Pune	India	December 7–9	1998
HLS 5	Kathmandu	Nepal	September 13–15	1999
HLS 6	Milwaukee, Wisconsin	United States	June 15–17	2000
HLS 7	Uppsala	Sweden	September 7–9	2001
HLS 8	Bern	Switzerland	September 19–22	2002
HLS 9	Mysore	India	December 9–12	2003
HLS 10	Thimphu	Bhutan	December 1–3	2004
HLS 11	Bangkok	Thailand	December 6–9	2005
HLS 12	Kathmandu	Nepal	November 26–29	2006
HLS 13	Shimla	India	October 22–24	2007
HLS 14	Gothenburg	Sweden	August 21–23	2008
HLS 15	Eugene, Oregon	United States	July 30–August 1	2009
HLS 16	London	United Kingdom	September 2–5	2010
HLS 17	Kobe	Japan	September 6–9	2011
HLS 18	Varanasi	India	September 10–12	2012
HLS 19	Canberra	Australia	September 6–8	2013
HLS 20	Singapore	Singapore	July 16–18	2014
HLS 21	Kirtipur	Nepal	November 26–28	2015
HLS 22	Guwahati	India	June 8–10	2016
HLS 23	Tezpur	India	July 5–7	2017
HLS 24	Lucknow	India	June 8–10	2018
HLS 25	Sydney	Australia	June 28–29	2019
HLS 26	Paris	France	September 4–6	2023
HLS 27	Guwahati	India	June 12–14	2024
HLS 28	Eugene, Oregon	United States	August 2–3	2025
HLS 29	New Delhi	India	October 30–November 1	2026

== See also ==
- Sino-Tibetan Etymological Dictionary and Thesaurus
- International Conference on Sino-Tibetan Languages and Linguistics
