= Lists of languages =

This page is a list of lists of languages.

== Published lists ==
- SIL International's Ethnologue: Languages of the World lists over 7,100 spoken and signed languages.
- The International Organization for Standardization (ISO) assigns codes for most languages; see ISO 639
  - List of ISO 639-1 codes – two-letter codes (184 major languages)
  - List of ISO 639-2 codes – three-letter codes
  - ISO 639 macrolanguage – ISO 639-2 codes used as ISO 639-3 codes
  - List of ISO 639-3 codes – three-letter codes, intended to "cover all known natural languages"
  - List of ISO 639-5 codes – three-letter codes for language families and groups
- IETF language tag – depends on ISO 639, but provides various expansion mechanisms
- Glottolog
- Linguasphere Observatory (LS-2010, totaling over 32,800 coded entries and over 70,900 linguistic names)

== English Wikipedia list articles ==
- Index of language articles

=== Comprehensive lists ===
Lists which are global in scope (all living natural languages would classify for inclusion):

- by country:
  - List of official languages by country and territory
  - Number of languages by country
- by name: List of language names (native names)
- by phylogenetic relation: List of language families (phylogenetic)
  - by primary language family: List of Afro-Asiatic languages, List of Austronesian languages, List of Indo-European languages, List of Mayan languages, List of Mongolic languages, List of Oto-Manguean languages, List of Tungusic languages, List of Turkic languages, List of Uralic languages.
- chronologically: List of languages by first written accounts
- by number of speakers:
  - List of languages by total number of speakers
  - List of languages by number of native speakers
- List of languages by number of words according to authoritative dictionaries
- List of languages by number of phonemes

=== By region ===
- Languages of Africa
- Indigenous languages of the Americas
  - List of Native American languages acquired by children
  - Languages of North America
  - Languages of South America
- Languages of Asia
  - East Asian languages
  - Languages of South Asia
  - Languages of Southeast Asia
- Languages of Europe
  - Languages of Russia
- Languages of Oceania
- Oceanic languages

=== By special type or property ===
- Extinct, endangered or revived languages
  - List of extinct languages
    - List of extinct languages of Africa
    - List of extinct languages of Asia
    - List of extinct languages of Central America and the Caribbean
    - List of extinct languages and dialects of Europe
    - List of extinct languages of Oceania
    - List of extinct languages of North America
    - List of extinct languages of South America
    - List of extinct Uto-Aztecan languages
    - List of languages by time of extinction
  - List of endangered languages
- List of endangered languages in Africa
- List of endangered languages in Asia
- List of endangered languages in Bangladesh
- List of endangered languages in Brazil
- List of endangered languages in Canada
- List of endangered languages in Central America
- List of endangered languages in Colombia
- List of endangered languages in China
- List of endangered languages in Europe
- List of endangered languages in India
- List of endangered languages in Indonesia
- List of endangered languages in Mexico
- List of endangered languages in Nepal
- List of endangered languages in North America
- List of endangered languages of Oceania
- List of endangered languages in Papua New Guinea
- List of endangered languages in Russia
- List of endangered languages in South America
- List of endangered languages in Sudan
- List of endangered languages in the United States
- List of endangered languages with mobile apps
- List of revived languages
- Regional language
- Languages outside genealogical classification
  - List of creole languages
  - List of mixed languages
  - List of pidgins, creoles, mixed languages and cants based on Indo-European languages
    - List of English-based pidgins
- List of sign languages
  - List of sign languages by number of native signers
- List of proto-languages
- List of constructed languages

=== By status or cultural sphere of influence ===
- List of lingua francas
- List of official languages
  - List of official languages by country and territory
  - List of official languages of international organizations
- Languages used on the Internet (includes a list of languages with the most prevalence online)
- List of mutually intelligible languages

== See also ==
- List of language self-study programs
- List of most commonly learned foreign languages in the United States
- List of linguists
- List of shorthand systems
- List of writing systems
- Lists of dialects and varieties
- Lists of computer languages
  - Lists of programming languages
  - List of ontology languages
  - List of modeling languages
  - List of markup languages
- Omniglot

By ISO 639-3 code
Enter an ISO code to find the corresponding language article.
