= Leiden school =

School of thought in linguistics

The Leiden school is a school of thought in linguistics that models languages as memes or benign neurological parasites, and tries to use rigorous mathematical tools borrowed by analogy from biological evolution to model the origin and spread of language in general and specific languages in particular.

It is based at the University of Leiden, and its chief proponents are George van Driem, Frederik Kortlandt, and Jeroen Wiedenhof. The Leiden school has a significant overlap in personnel with the Himalayan Languages Project.

The Leiden school of linguistics should not be confused with the current research institute of linguistics at Leiden University, the Leiden University Centre for Linguistics (LUCL) or the methodology employed in the Indo-European Etymological Dictionary currently worked on at this institute.

== See also ==
- Structural anthropology
- Symbiosism
