= Kiranti languages =

Sino-Tibetan language family

Kiranti
- Geographic distribution: Eastern Nepal and India (Sikkim, Darjeeling, Kalimpong & Bhutan
- Ethnicity: Kirati, Yakkha, Limbu, Rai and Sunuwar
- Linguistic classification: Sino-Tibetan: Kiranti
- Subdivisions: Eastern; Central; Western

Language codes
- Glottolog: kira1253
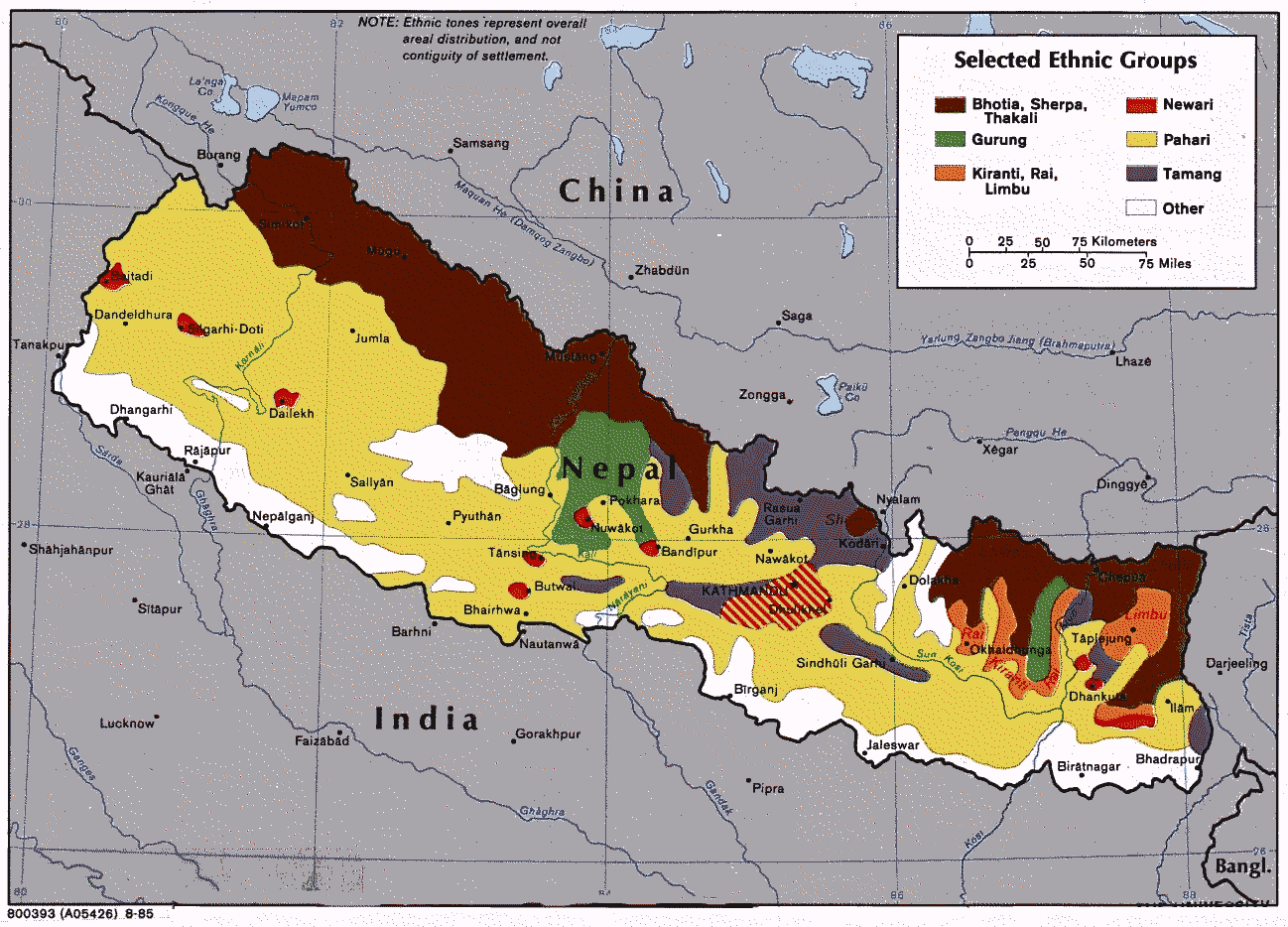
- Ethnic groups within Nepal

The Kiranti languages are a major family of Sino-Tibetan languages spoken in Nepal and India (notably Sikkim, Darjeeling, Kalimpong, and Bhutan) by the Kirati people.

== External relationships ==
George van Driem had formerly proposed that the Kiranti languages were part of a Mahakiranti family, although specialists are not completely certain of either the existence of a Kiranti subgroup or its precise membership. LaPolla (2003), though, proposes that Kiranti may be part of a larger "Rung" group.

== Classification ==
There are about two dozen Kiranti languages. Among the better known are Limbu, Sunuwar, Bantawa, Chamling, Sampang, Khaling, Bahing, Yakkha, Wayu, Dungmali, Lohorung, and Kulung.

Kiranti verbs are not easily segmentable, due in large part to the presence of portmanteau morphemes, crowded affix strings, and extensive (and often nonintuitive) allomorphy. Thus, their relationship to each other has been a subject of debate.

Overall, Kiranti languages are classified:

- Eastern Kiranti
  - Limbu language
      - Yakkha language
      - Belhare language
      - Athpare language
      - Chintang language
      - Upper Arun
          - Yamphu language
          - Lohorung language
          - Mewahang language
  - Central Kiranti
    - Khambu (Rai)
      - Kulung language
      - Nachhiring language
      - Sampang language
      - Saam language
      - Bantawa language
      - Puma language
      - Chamling language
      - Dungmali language
    - Thulung language (perhaps a primary branch of Kiranti Rai)
    - Chaurasiya
      - Wambule language
    - Upper Dudhkosi River:
      - Khaling language
      - Dumi language
      - Koi language
      - Bahing language
    - Western Kiranti
      - Sunuwar language
      - Hayu language
      - Jerung language

Ethnologue adds Tilung language to Western Kiranti, based on Opgenort (2011).

=== Opgenort (2005) ===
Opgenort (2005) classifies the Kiranti languages as follows, and recognizes a basic east-west division within Kiranti.

- Kiranti
  - Western
    - Hayu
      - Thulung
        - Bahing, Sunuwar
        - Jero, Wambule
  - Central
    - Khaling, Dumi
        - Kulung
        - Chamling, Bantawa
  - Eastern
      - Yamphu, Limbu

=== Gerber & Grollmann (2018) ===
Historical linguists, as early as 2012, do not consider Kiranti to be a coherent group, but rather a paraphyletic one due to lack of shared innovations. Gerber & Grollmann (2018) presented additional evidence supporting the paraphyletic nature of Kiranti. A Central-Eastern Kiranti group is considered to be valid by Gerber & Grollmann (2018), but they consider "Western Kiranti" unclassified within Trans-Himalayan languages.

- Central-Eastern Kiranti
  - Lhokpu, Dhimal, Toto
  - Central Kiranti
  - Upper Arun
  - Greater Yakkha-Limbu

Independent branches (formerly part of "Western Kiranti") that are unclassified within Trans-Himalayan (Sino-Tibetan):

- Dumi-Khaling
- Chaurasiya-Northwest: Wambule, Bahing, Sunuwar; ? Jero; ? Hayu
- Thulung-Tilung-Kohi

Grollmann (2023) identifies a Khambu subgroup that consists of three languages, Kulung, Nachiring, and Sampang. Camling may also be a Khambu language.

Proto-Eastern Kiranti vowel reconstruction is discussed in Gerber & Grollmann (2025).

==== Sound changes ====
Sound changes defining each subgroup (Gerber & Grollmann 2018):

- Central-Eastern Kiranti (*voiceless > preglottalised; *voiced > voiceless; *ʔk > kʰ; *ʔc > cʰ)
  - Lhokpu, Dhimal, Toto
  - Central Kiranti (*ʔp > b; *ʔt > d)
  - Upper Arun (*ʔp > b; *ʔt > d; *r > j)
  - Greater Yakkha-Limbu (*ʔp > pʰ; *ʔt > tʰ; *r > j)

Independent branches (formerly part of "Western Kiranti") that are unclassified within Trans-Himalayan (Sino-Tibetan):

- Dumi-Khaling (innovative verbal dual marker -i)
- Chaurasiya-Northwest (*kʷ > ʔw ~ ʔb)
  - Wambule, Bahing, Sunuwar; ? Jero; ? Hayu
- Thulung-Tilung-Kohi (*p > t; *b > d)

The Khambu branch is defined by the following sound changes.

- *ŋ > zero, *k > zero in final syllabic position, and also vowel change to o, ʌ, ə before the precending vowel *a
- Palatalization of *t and *n before /i/ in final syllabic position
- *eŋ > aŋ

== Reconstruction ==
Research on proto-Kiranti includes work on phonology and comparative morphology by George van Driem, reconstructions by Michailovsky (1991) and Sergei Starostin 1994. Michailovsky and Starostin differ by the number of stop series reconstructed (three vs four) and the interpretation of the correspondences.

Opgenort introduces the reconstruction of preglottalized resonants; his reconstruction is generally based on Starostin's four series system. More recently, Jacques proposed a reconstruction of proto-Kiranti verb roots based on Michailovsky's system, and analyzes the other initial correspondences (in particular, the series reconstructed as non-aspirated unvoiced stops by Starostin) as due to morphological alternations and inter-Kiranti borrowing. In addition, he presents a preliminary discussion of the reconstruction of stem alternation and stress patterns on the basis of Khaling and Dumi.
