= List of endangered languages in North America =

Language Endangerment Status by UNESCO Atlas of the World's Languages in Danger category

Extinct (EX)
- Extinct (EX): (lists)

Endangered
- Critically Endangered (CR); Severely Endangered (SE); Definitely Endangered (DE); Vulnerable (VU): (list); (list); (list); (list)

Safe
- Safe (NE): no list
- Other categories
- Revived (RE); Constructed (CL): (list); (list)
- Related topics: Atlas of the World's Languages in Danger; Endangered Languages Project; Ethnologue; Unclassified language; List of languages by total number of speakers
- UNESCO Atlas of the World's; Languages in Danger categories

An endangered language is a language that it is at risk of falling out of use, generally because it has few surviving speakers. If it loses all of its native speakers, it becomes an extinct language. UNESCO defines four levels of language endangerment between "safe" (not endangered) and "extinct":

- Vulnerable
- Definitely endangered
- Severely endangered
- Critically endangered

North America is a continent in the Earth's Northern Hemisphere and (chiefly) Western Hemisphere. It is bordered on the north by the Arctic Ocean, on the east by the North Atlantic Ocean, on the southeast by the Caribbean Sea, and on the south and west by the North Pacific Ocean; South America lies to the southeast. It covers an area of about 24,709,000 square kilometres (9,540,000 sq mi), about 4.8% of the planet's surface or about 16.5% of its land area. As of July 2007, its population was estimated at nearly 524 million people.

Today, North America only has a total of 256 living languages. However, out of those 256 languages, 238 are in the realm of extinction. That is, 92% of these languages are dying. The United States has the highest number of dying languages, 143 out of 219 languages, then Canada with 75 dying out of its 94 languages, and lastly, Greenland has the smallest number, nil of its two spoken languages.

== Canada ==
Canada
Language	Comments	Speakers	Source
Beaver language		300 speakers in 1991.	Red Book of Endangered Languages
Bella Coola language	Also: Nuxalk language	3 (2022) 20 (2002 Poser) 700 (1991 Kinkade).	
Cayuga language		40 to 60 speakers in 2002.	Red Book of Endangered Languages
Chinook Wawa language	Also: Chinook Jargon language	83 in Canada (1962 Chafe)Population total all countries: 100.	
Northern Haida language	See Haida language	30 in Canada (1995 M Krauss)Population total all countries: 45 1,100 in Canada (1995 M Krauss).	
Southern Haida language	See Haida language	10 (1995 M Krauss) 500 (1995 M Krauss).	
Haisla language		25 (1991 M Dale Kinkade) 1,000 (1977 SIL).	
Heiltsuk language	Hai?zaqvla	300 (1991 M Dale Kinkade).	
Han language		7 or 8 in Canada (1997 Krauss) 300.	
Inuiuuk	ᐃᓄᐃᐆᒃ	40 in Nunavut (2012 Joke Schuit).	University of Central Lancashire
Kutenai language	Kutanaxa	6 in Canada (2002 Poser)Population total all countries: 12.	
Maritime Sign Language			
Michif language		About 600 speakers in 1998.	Red Book of Endangered Languages
Munsee language		7 or 8 (1991 M Dale Kinkade) 400 (1991 M Dale Kinkade).	
Oneida language		fewer than 250 speakers in 1991.	Red Book of Endangered Languages
Onondaga language		50 to 100 speakers in 1991.	Red Book of Endangered Languages
Potawatomi language		100 speakers	Red Book of Endangered Languages
Plains Sign Talk			
Salish language			Red Book of Endangered Languages
Straits Salish language		20 in Canada (2002 Poser) 3,000 (1977 SIL).	
Sechelt language	Also: Shishalh language	40 (1990 M.D Kinkade) 550 (1977 SIL).	
Sekani language		30 to 40 (1997 Sharon Hargus) 600 (1982 SIL and 1997 S Hargus).	
Seneca language		25 speakers in 1991.	Red Book of Endangered Languages
Squamish language		15 (2002 Poser) 2,300.	
Tagish language		2 (1995 M Krauss) 400 possibly (1995 M Krauss).	
Tahltan language		35 (2002 Poser) 750 (1977 SIL).	
Tlingit language		145 speakers in Canada in 1998.	Red Book of Endangered Languages
Tsuut’ina language	Also: Tsuu T'ina language, Sarsi language, Sarcee language	50 (1991 M. Dale Kinkade)	Red Book of Endangered Languages
Tuscarora language		7 or 8 in Canada (1991 Kinkade)Population total all countries: 11 to 13.	
Western Abnaki language		20 (1991 M Krauss) 1,800 including Eastern Abnaki in US (1982 SIL).	

== United States ==
United States
Language	Comments	Speakers	Source
Achumawi language		10 nonfluent speakers (1997 Nevin) 1,000 (1997 Bruce Nevin).	
Alutiiq language		30 speakers (2009) 1,000 .	
Ahtena language		80 (1995 M Krauss) 500 (1995 M Krauss).	
Kiowa Apache language		18 (1990 census) 1,000 (1977 SIL).	
Lipan Apache language		2 or 3 (1981 R W Young) 100 (1977 SIL).	
Arikara language		20 (1997 Parks) 3,000.	
Atsugewi language		3 (1994 L Hinton) 200 (1977 SIL)1,350 with Achumawi (2000 A Yamamoto).	
Caddo language		25 (1997 Chafe) 3,371 (1997 W Chafe).	
Cahuilla language		7 to 20 (1994 L Hinton) 35 (1990 census).	
Chetco language		5 (1962 Chafe) 100 possibly (1977 SIL).	
Cheyenne language			
Chinook language		12 speakers of Kiksht dialect (1996) 300 possibly (1977 SIL).	
Chinook Wawa language		17 in the US (1990 census).	
Clallam language		10 (1997 Timothy Montler) Several thousands (1997 T Montler).	
Coeur d'Alene language		5 (1999 R McDonald) 800 (1977 SIL).	
Comanche language		less than 130 (less than 1% of 13,000 tribal members as of 2006)	
Coos language		1 or 2 (1962 Chafe) 250 (1977 SIL).	
Degexit'an language		20 to 30 (1997 Sharon Hargus) 250 to 300 (1997 M Krauss).	
Gros Ventre language		10 (1977 SIL)Very few semispeakers in 2000 (2001 Goddard) 1,200 (1977 SIL).	
Northern Haida language		15 in the US (1995 M Krauss) 600 in the US (1995 M Krauss).	
Hän language		7 or 8 in Alaska (1995 M Krauss)Population total all countries: 14 300.	
Hawai'i Sign Language		A few users out of about 6,000 profoundly deaf people in Hawaii (1987 Honolulu Star-Bulletin), 72,000 deaf or hard-of-hearing people in Hawaii (1998 Honolulu Advertiser).	
Holikachuk language		12 (1995 M Krauss) 200 (1995 M Krauss).	
Hupa language		8 (1998 Brook) 2,000.	
Kalapuya language		1 or 2 (1962 Chafe).	
Kansa language		19 (1990 census) 250 (1986 SIL).	
Karok language		10 (1997 William Bright) 1,900 (2000 A Yamamoto).	
Kashaya language		45 (1994 L Hinton).	
Kawaiisu language		8 to 10 (2000 L Hinton) 35 (2000 A Yamamoto).	
Klamath-Modoc language		1 (1998 N.Y Times, April 9, p A20) 2,000 (1997 Scott DeLancey).	
Upper Kuskokwim language		40 (1995 Krauss)3 households (1997) 160 (1995 Krauss).	
Kutenai language		6 in the US (2002).	
Louisiana Creole language		9,600 (2010).	
Louisiana French language		150,000 to 200,000 (2012).	
Luiseño language		30 to 40 (2000 L Hinton) 2,000 (2000 A Yamamoto).	
Lushootseed language		60 (1990 M D Kinkade)Population evenly divided between the northern and southern dialects 2,000 (1990 M D Kinkade).	
Northeast Maidu language		1 to 2 (1994 L Hinton) 108 (1990 census).	
Northwest Maidu language		3 to 6 (1994 L Hinton) 200 (1977 SIL).	
Mandan language		6 (1992 M Krauss) 400 (1986 SIL and 1997 M Mixco).	
Menominee language		39 (3,500 ethnic) (1977 SIL).	
Central Sierra Miwok language		12 Population includes 6 Eastern Central Sierra, 6 Western Central Sierra (1994 L Hinton) Possibly 5,000 all Miwok (2000 Yamamoto).	
Lake Miwok language		1 to 2 (1994 L Hinton).	
Northern Sierra Miwok language		6 (1994 L Hinton).	
Plains Miwok language		1 (1962 H Landar in Sebeok 1977).	
Southern Sierra Miwok language		7 Southern Central Sierra Miwok (1994 L Hinton).	
Mono language		Western Mono: 37 to 41 (1994 L Hinton) Population includes 10-12 North Fork, 15 Auberry, 7-8 Big Sandy, 5-6 Dunlap, no Waksachi. Eastern Mono: 50 (1994 L Hinton); 600 (2000 A Yamamoto).	
Nisenan language		1 (1994 L Hinton).	
Osage language		5 (1991 M Krauss) 15,000 (1997 Carolyn Quintero).	
Panamint language		20 100 (1998 John E McLaughlin).	
Pawnee language		20 (1997 Parks) 2,500 (1997 Parks).	
Plains Sign Talk			
Central Pomo language		2 to 5 (1997 Mithun) 4,766 (1997 Mithun).	
Southeastern Pomo language		5 (1994 L Hinton).	
Southern Pomo language		1 (1994 L Hinton).	
Quapaw language		34 (1990 census) 2,000 (1986 SIL).	
Quileute language		10 (1977 SIL) 300 (1977 SIL).	
Straits Salish language			
Serrano language		1 (1994 Coker).	
Snohomish language		10 (1998 J Brooke) 800 (1977 SIL).	
Tanacross language		35 (1997 G Holton)Population includes 3 in the Healy Lake dialect, 32 in Mansfield-Ketchumstuck 120 (1997 G Holton).	
Tanaina language		75 (1997 M Krauss) 900 (1997 M Krauss).	
Lower Tanana language		30 (1995 M Krauss) 380 (1995 M Krauss).	
Tolowa language		4 to 5 (1994 Hinton) 1,000 (2000 Yamamoto).	
Tübatulabal language		6 900 (2000 Yamamoto).	
Tuscarora language		4 to 5 in the US (1997 Mithun) 1,200 in the US (1997 Mithun).	
Tututni language		10 (1962 Chafe).	
Wasco-Wishram language		69 (1990 census)7 monolinguals 750 possibly (1977 SIL).	
Washo language		10 (1998 J Brooke) 1,500 (2000 A Yamamoto).	
Wichita language		3 (2000 Brian Levy) 1,400 (2000 David S Rood).	
Wintu language		5 or 6 (1997 Shepherd) 2,244 (1997 Shepherd)	
Yokutsan languages		78 speakers of Northern Foothill Yokuts (1990 census) 2,500 (2000 A Yamamoto).	
Yuchi language		10 to 12 (1997 Mary Linn) 1,500 (1977 SIL).	
Yurok language		12 (2002 Goddard) 3,000 to 4,500 possibly (1982 SIL).	

== See also ==
- List of extinct languages of North America
- List of extinct languages of Central America and the Caribbean
- List of extinct languages of South America
