= Ha Yu =

Ha Yu may refer to:

- Ha Yu (actor) (born 1946), actor from Hong Kong
- Ha Yu (director) (born 1963), or Yoo Ha, South Korean poet and film director

== See also ==
- Hayu people
- Hayu language
- Hayu (subscription service)
- Princess Hayu
