= List of endangered languages in Canada =

Language Endangerment Status by UNESCO Atlas of the World's Languages in Danger category

Extinct (EX)
- Extinct (EX): (lists)

Endangered
- Critically Endangered (CR); Severely Endangered (SE); Definitely Endangered (DE); Vulnerable (VU): (list); (list); (list); (list)

Safe
- Safe (NE): no list
- Other categories
- Revived (RE); Constructed (CL): (list); (list)
- Related topics: Atlas of the World's Languages in Danger; Endangered Languages Project; Ethnologue; Unclassified language; List of languages by total number of speakers
- UNESCO Atlas of the World's; Languages in Danger categories

An endangered language is a language that is at risk of falling out of use, generally because it has few surviving speakers. If a language loses all of its native speakers, it becomes an extinct language. UNESCO defines four levels of language endangerment between "safe" (not endangered) and "extinct":

- Vulnerable
- Definitely endangered
- Severely endangered
- Critically endangered

Table of Languages:

Language	Status	Number of Native Speakers	Language Family	Province(s) / Territories Spoken
Algonquin/Anishinàbemiwin	Vulnerable	3,320 (2016)	Algonquian languages	Ontario, Quebec
Aivilingmiutut/Aivilik	Vulnerable		Eskaleut languages	Nunavut
Assiniboine	Critically endangered	150 (2007)	Siouan languages	Saskatchewan; Montana (United States)
Atikamekw	Vulnerable	6,200 (2016)	Algonquian languages	Quebec
Blackfoot/Siksiká	Definitely endangered	2,900 (2016)	Algonquian languages	Alberta; Montana (United States)
Bungee	Critically endangered	< 200 (1993)	Indo-European languages (Germanic languages)	Manitoba
Cayuga (Canada)	Critically endangered	< 55 (2015)	Iroquoian languages	Ontario; New York (United States)
Central Ojibwa	Vulnerable	8,000 (2007)	Algonquian languages	Ontario
Chilcotin/Tsilhqotʹin	Severely endangered	860 (2014)	Athabaskan languages	British Columbia
Chinook Jargon	Critically endangered	1 (2013)	Wakashan languages	British Columbia, Yukon; Alaska, California, Idaho, Montana, Oregon, Washington (United States)
Chipewyan/Dene/Dënesųłiné	Vulnerable	11,325 (2016)	Athabaskan languages	Alberta, Manitoba, Northwest Territories, Nunavut, Saskatchewan
Comox-Sliammon/ʔayajuθəm	Critically endangered	~47 (2018)	Salishan languages	British Columbia
Dakota	Critically endangered	290 (2016)	Siouan languages	Manitoba, Saskatchewan; Minnesota, Montana, Nebraska, North Dakota, South Dakota (United States)
Dane-zaa/Beaver	Definitely endangered	270 (2021)	Dene–Yeniseian languages	Alberta, British Columbia
Dogrib/Tłı̨chǫ	Definitely Endangered	1,735 (2016)	Athabaskan languages	Northwest Territories
Eastern Cree/James Bay Cree	Vulnerable	400 (2016)	Algonquian languages	Quebec
Eastern Ojibwe/Ojibwa	Severely endangered	26,000 (1998)	Algonquian languages	Ontario
Gitxsan	Severely endangered	1,020 (2016)	Tsimshianic languages	British Columbia
Gwich'in	Severely endangered	~560 (2007–2016)	Athabaskan languages	Northwest Territories, Yukon; Alaska (United States)
Haisla	Critically endangered	240 (2014)	Wakashan languages	British Columbia
Halkomelem/Hul'qumi'num	Severely endangered	100–260 (2014)	Salishan languages	British Columbia; Washington (United States)
Hän/Han	Critically endangered	6 (2020)	Athabaskan languages	Yukon; Alaska (United States)
Heiltsuk/Bella Bella	Critically endangered	220 (2016)	Wakashan languages	British Columbia
Innu/Eastern Montagnais	Vulnerable	10,075 (2016)	Algonquian languages	Labrador, Quebec
Inuinnaqtun	Definitely endangered	1,310 (2016)	Eskaleut languages	Northwest Territories, Nunavut
Inuit Sign Language/Inuiuuk	Critically endangered	47 (2000)	Language isolate	Nunavut
Inupiaq/Alaskan Inuit (Canada)	Severely endangered	1,250 (2023)	Eskaleut languages	Northwest Territories; Alaska (United States)
Kaska	Severely endangered	240 (2016)	Athabaskan languages	British Columbia, Northwest Territories, Yukon
Kivallirmiutut/Kivalliq	Vulnerable		Eskaleut languages	Nunavut
Kutenai	Severely endangered	345 (2010–2016)	Language isolate	British Columbia; Idaho, Montana (United States)
Kwak'wala	Critically endangered	150 (2021)	Wakashan languages	British Columbia
Lillooet/St̓át̓imcets	Severely endangered	120	Salishan languages	British Columbia
Malecite-Passamaquoddy	Definitely endangered	310 (2021)	Algonquian languages	New Brunswick; Maine (United States)
Maritime Sign Language	Critically endangered	90 (2009)	BANZSL	New Brunswick, Newfoundland and Labrador, Nova Scotia, Prince Edward Island
Maniwaki Algonquin/Southern Anishinàbemiwin	Severely endangered	3,330 (2016)	Algonquian languages	Ontario, Quebec
Michif	Critically endangered	1,800 (2021)	Plains Cree and Métis French	Alberta, British Columbia, Manitoba, Ontario, Saskatchewan; North Dakota (United States)
Mi'kmaq/Migmaw(Canada)	Vulnerable	7,140 (2016)	Algonquian languages	New Brunswick, Newfoundland and Labrador, Nova Scotia, Prince Edward Island; Maine (United States)
Mohawk/Kanienʼkéha (Canada)	Definitely endangered	3,875 (2011–2016)	Iroquoian languages	Ontario, Quebec; New York (United States)
Moose Cree/Ililîmowin	Vulnerable	3,000 (2007)	Algonquian languages	Ontario
Munsee/Munsee Lenape/Ontario Delaware (Canada)	Critically endangered	1 (2022)	Algonquian languages	Ontario
Naskapi/Iyuw Iyimuun	Vulnerable	1,230 (2016)	Algonquian languages	Newfoundland and Labrador, Quebec
Natsilingmiutut/Netsilik	Vulnerable		Eskaleut languages	Nunavut
Nisga'a	Severely endangered	470 (2016)	Tsimshianic languages	British Columbia
Nootka/Nuu-chah-nulth	Severely endangered	945 (2021)	Wakashan languages	British Columbia
North Slavey	Definitely endangered		Athabaskan languages	Northwest Territories
Northern Haida	Critically endangered		Language isolate	British Columbia; Alaska (United States)
Northern Tutchone	Definitely endangered	360 (2016)	Athabaskan languages	Yukon
Northwestern Ojibwe	Vulnerable	20,000 (2000)	Algonquian languages	Manitoba, Ontario
Inuttitut/Nunatsiavummiutut/Nunatsiavut	Vulnerable		Eskaleut languages	Newfoundland and Labrador
Nuxalk/Bella Coola	Critically endangered	17 (2014)	Salishan languages	British Columbia
Oji-Cree/Severn Ojibwa	Vulnerable	13,630 (2016)	Algonquian languages	Manitoba, Ontario
Okanagan	Definitely endangered	125 (2007–2014)	Salishan languages	British Columbia; Washington (United States)
Oneida	Critically endangered	210 (2021)	Iroquoian languages	Ontario; New York, Wisconsin (United States)
Onondaga	Critically endangered	40 (2007)	Iroquoian languages	Ontario; New York (United States)
Odawa	Severely endangered	5,108	Algonquian languages	Ontario; Michigan, Oklahoma (United States)
Plains Cree	Vulnerable	3,200 (2001–2016)	Algonquian languages	Alberta, Manitoba, Saskatchewan; Montana (United States)
Potawatomi	Critically endangered	5 (2018)	Algonquian languages	Ontario; Indiana, Kansas Michigan, Oklahoma, Wisconsin (United States)
Qikiqtaaluk Nigiani/South Baffin dialect	Vulnerable		Eskaleut languages	Nunavut
Qikiqtaaluk Uannangani/North Baffin dialect	Vulnerable		Eskaleut languages	Nunavut
Rigolet Inuktitut	Critically endangered		Eskaleut languages	Nunavut
Sarcee/Tsuutʼina	Critically endangered	80 (2016)	Athabaskan languages	Alberta
Saulteaux/Nakawēmowin	Vulnerable	10,000 (2002)	Algonquian languages	Manitoba, Saskatchewan
Sechelt	Critically endangered	2 (2019)	Salishan languages	British Columbia
Sekani	Critically endangered	35 (2021)	Athabaskan languages	British Columbia
Seneca	Critically endangered	100 (2007)	Iroquoian languages	Ontario; New York (United States)
Shuswap /Secwepemctsín	Definitely endangered	200 (2014)	Salishan languages	British Columbia
Sallirmiutun	Severely endangered		Eskaleut languages	Northwest Territories
South Slavey	Definitely endangered		Athabaskan languages	Northwest Territories
Southern Haida	Critically endangered		Language isolate	British Columbia; Alaska (United States)
Southern Tutchone	Critically endangered	360 (2016)	Athabaskan languages	Yukon
Squamish/Sḵwx̱wú7mesh	Critically endangered	25 (2021)	Salishan languages	British Columbia
Stoney/Nakota/Nakoda	Vulnerable	3,025 (2016)	Siouan languages	Alberta
North Straits Salish	Severely endangered	105 (2016)	Salishan languages	British Columbia; Washington (United States)
Swampy Cree/Maskekon/Omaškêkowak	Vulnerable	1,805 (2016)	Algonquian languages	Ontario
Tahltan	Critically endangered	235 (2021)	Athabaskan languages	British Columbia
Thompson/Nlaka'pamuctsin	Severely endangered	105 (2022)	Salishan languages	British Columbia; Washington (United States)
Tlingit	Critically endangered	170 (2016–2020)	Dene–Yeniseian languages	British Columbia, Yukon; Alaska, Washington (United States)
Coast Tsimshian/Sm'álgyax	Critically endangered	278 (2020)	Tsimshianic languages	British Columbia; Alaska (United States)
Upper Tanana/Nabesna	Critically endangered	110 (1997–2007)	Athabaskan languages	Yukon; Alaska (United States)
Western Abenaki/Aln8ba8dwaw8gan	Critically endangered	14 (2007–2012)	Algonquian languages	Quebec
Woods Cree/Bush Cree	Vulnerable	1,800 (2016)	Algonquian languages	Manitoba, Saskatchewan

== Changes in Canadian Endangered Languages ==
=== Oneida ===
- Critically Endangered

There is a "phonological process" in the Oneida language that has been passed down for generations. This process is described as the loss of voicing in the vowel of the last syllable of a word. It is vital to the preservation of the language, and has been changing among the speakers, such that some speakers have introduced a degree of voiced vowels in these final forms, which poses additional stress on the small population of speakers. The introduction of voicing the last syllable in words that typically are unvoiced changes the traditional morphology of the language, pushing the original dialect towards language death, especially since the majority of speakers are older in age. It is part of the Iroquoian language family.

=== Blackfoot ===
- Definitely Endangered

The Blackfoot language features the loss of voicing in the last syllable of a word, which is typically inaudible. Certain inflections and the use of inaudible vowels has been identified as "old Blackfoot" (traditional), and are not in frequent use by younger speakers. Similarly, a minority of Blackfoot speakers use the "soundless" suffixes, which is pushing the traditional language towards more extreme language endangerment and potentially language death. It is part of the Algonquian language family.

=== Chipewyan ===
- Definitely Endangered

The Chipewyan language exhibits morphological characteristics that are far more complex than the majority of European languages. This includes conditioning of tone and morphology of phonemes, as well as frequent contractions, elisions, metatheses, and consonantal substitutions. Chipewyan is mainly endangered due to its complex structure, which makes it difficult to decipher the morphological code, as well as the fact that the majority of the speakers are in their mid-late adulthood. It is part of the Athapaskan language family.

=== Assiniboine ===
Also called Nakoda or Hohe

- Critically Endangered

Assinibone is one of the language divisions out of five main language divisions within the Dakotan group of the Siouan family. The sound of this language differs from the other languages in the group because it merges voiceless stops with voiced stops. There are reports that syllabaries have been used by Assinibone speakers. The Assiniboine language is spread over 2 communities in Canada, and is mainly used by older adults.

=== Central Ojibwe ===
Also called Anishinaabemowin, Ojibway, and Chippewa

- Definitely Endangered

There are about 8,000 speakers of the Central Ojibwe language, and it is spread over 16 communities in Canada. The language is spoken from Ontario to Manitoba. It is also spoken in places from Michigan to Montana next to the Great Lakes which is the home of the Ojibwe people. The language today is spoken by people over the age of 70. The people of the Ojibwe language note that double vowels in their language are treated as standing for unit sounds, therefore they are alphabetized after corresponding single values.

=== Lakota ===
- Critically Endangered

There are about 6,000 speakers in the Northern Plain States of North Dakota and South Dakota. Most native speakers are in their mid-50s. There is a growing interest to revitalize the language. At the Red Cloud Indian school, there are immersion classes for children to teach the language. However, at the moment, there are no children on the Standing Rock Indian Reservation that are fluent in the language. Within the next ten years, it is expected that there will be children fluent in Lakota. It is mutually intelligible with Dakota and part of the Siouan language family.

=== Dakota ===
- Definitely Endangered

There are about 20,000 native speakers, primarily in the North Dakota and South Dakota area, and additionally a speaker community of about 4,000 in Minnesota. Dakota Wicohon is an after-school camp that helps children learn the language, since it is not taught in the government-run boarding schools for American Indian youth. To help preservation efforts, technology like phraselators come into play, allowing learners to type in the words they want or orally speak the word they want and the machine will find it for them. It is mutually intelligible with Lakota and part of the Siouan language family.

=== Dogrib ===
Also called Tlinchon

- Vulnerable

There are about 2,640 speakers of the language in the Canadian Northwest Territories from the Great Slave Lake to the Great Bear Lake. Dogrib phonology is rather intricate and is organized into 5 levels. The first person to write a book in Dogrib was Herb Zimmerman, who translated the Bible into the language in 1981. Unlike many other Native American languages, there are children who are fluent in the language. It is part of the Northern Athabaskan language family.

=== Kaska ===
- Severely Endangered

Kaska was typically a First Nations speaking language, and mainly lived in northern British Columbia and some from southeast Yukon in Canada. People who speak Kaska today still live within the British Columbia and Yukon Territory area. The speakers are elders, such as grandparents, and their children and grandchildren would speak English. First Nations have started work to re-create and preserve their heritage language. It is part of the Athabaskan language family.

=== Ottawa ===
Also called Odawa

- Severely Endangered

The number of people who speak the Ottawa dialect is unknown, though it is predicted to be around 13,000. Native communities received $5 million a year for 7 years (2007–2014) to help them in their efforts to preserve their languages and teach it to their children. The language is written with Latin letters and is a dialect of the Ojibwe language. Many descendants of migrants now live in Kansas and Oklahoma.

=== Stoney ===
Also called Nakoda or Alberta Assiniboine

- Vulnerable

There are roughly 3,200 people who speak Stoney in the Northern Plains and the Alberta province of Canada. Stoney uses the Latin alphabet. The stress is one of the harder aspects about the language. The Stoney Indian Language Project was created to help make a standard format of the Stoney language. The project created 6 books for adults and children, as well as a videotape for third graders. Stoney is part of the Siouan language family.

=== Potawatomi ===
- Critically Endangered

The Potawatomi Language is critically endangered because there are only 52 fluent speakers left surrounding the Great Lakes region in Michigan. Within a decade, those who are fluent (the majority being the elderly) will soon be dead, causing the culture to die out with them, along with the knowledge of history that has been passed down from previous generations. English has become the predominant language spoken in homes due to the halt of parents speaking Potawatomi to children from 20 to more than 50 years ago. Currently there are no teachings of the language but there are revitalization efforts to bring back the language and the culture that could possibly be gone forever. Potawatomi is a Central Algonquian Language.

=== Tuscarora ===
- Critically Endangered

Tuscarora entails complex morphology dealing with the copying of words, roots, stems, and affixes. Historically, the language was situated in North Carolina There was a time where the Tuscarora language was spoken 'as the mother tongue,' used for all situations, (formal and informal) but now there are approximately only four to five remaining elders who are fluent in the language. All of the elders are around the ages of seventy to eighty years old, where a possible result is the extinction of the Tuscarora language. It is a Northern Iroquoian Language.

=== Cayuga ===
- Critically Endangered

The Native American Cayuga speaking people are located in Oklahoma and Ontario. With the splitting of the people into two geographical locations, they now begin to differ in terms of language usage, morphology and phonology. In the setting of Oklahoma, Cayuga has become influenced by other tribes and has, to a certain extent, lost its original vocabulary. Cayuga contains a pitch accent where the placement of it can be predicted by metrical structure and constraints on the structure of the syllables. It is a Northern Iroquoian Language.

=== Upper Tanana Language ===
- Critically Endangered

The Upper Tanana Language originally was spoken in only five villages, each with a different dialect. Those villages were Beaver Creek, Scottie Creek, Northway, Nabesna, and Tetlin. Today, the language is only spoken by about 95 people, above the age of 50, in eastern interior Alaska. Depending on the dialect, the Upper Tanana Language has about six to seven phonemic vowels. The primary difference between the dialects is the pitch of the tone. Also a major factor in the split of different dialects is that different dialects have different vowel inventories.

=== Nootka ===
Also called Nuu-chah-nulth language.

- Severely Endangered

Despite misinterpretation of studies which describe the phonetic inventory of Nootka, these studies do not suggest that its phonemic inventory is the main reason why the Nootka language may be severely endangered. A process known as glottalization is a key factor in being able to articulate certain sounds in the language, called ejective consonants. Though these sounds are not found in English, they are not linguistically rare. Many languages with large speaker communities, including Arabic and Amharic, contain these sounds, an observation which discredits this theory. It is clear that Nootka, like all Canadian aboriginal languages, is endangered due to social factors alone.
