= List of endangered languages in the United States =

Language Endangerment Status by UNESCO Atlas of the World's Languages in Danger category

Extinct (EX)
- Extinct (EX): (lists)

Endangered
- Critically Endangered (CR); Severely Endangered (SE); Definitely Endangered (DE); Vulnerable (VU): (list); (list); (list); (list)

Safe
- Safe (NE): no list
- Other categories
- Revived (RE); Constructed (CL): (list); (list)
- Related topics: Atlas of the World's Languages in Danger; Endangered Languages Project; Ethnologue; Unclassified language; List of languages by total number of speakers
- UNESCO Atlas of the World's; Languages in Danger categories

An endangered language is a language that it is at risk of falling out of use, generally because it has few surviving speakers. If it loses all of its native speakers, it becomes an extinct language. UNESCO defines four levels of language endangerment between "safe" (not endangered) and "extinct":

- Vulnerable
- Definitely endangered
- Severely endangered
- Critically endangered

Language	Speakers	Status	Comments
Acoma-Laguna language	10,670 (2007)	Definitely endangered	Keresan languages
Ahtna language	80	Critically endangered	
Alabama language	370	Definitely endangered	
Aleut language (Eastern)	150 (2011)	Critically endangered	Number of speakers includes both Eastern and Western dialects.
Aleut language (Western)	150 (2011)	Severely endangered	Number of speakers includes both Eastern and Western dialects.
Arapaho language (Wyoming)	1,000	Vulnerable	
Arikara language	3	Critically endangered	
Assiniboine language (United States)	250	Critically endangered	
Blackfoot language (United States)	5,100	Vulnerable	
Cahuilla language	15	Critically endangered	
Central Alaskan Yup'ik language	18,950	Vulnerable	Two varieties, one on Nunivak Island.
Central Siberian Yupik language (St. Lawrence Island)	1,010	Vulnerable	
Central Sierra Miwok language	12 (1994)	Critically endangered	
Chemehuevi language	500-800, 20 first-language speakers (2011)	Critically endangered	
Cherokee language (North Carolina)	1,000	Critically endangered	
Cherokee language (Oklahoma)	22,000	Critically endangered	
Cheyenne language (Montana)	1,900 (2015)	Vulnerable	Number of speakers includes both Montana and Oklahoma dialects.
Cheyenne language (Oklahoma)	1,900 (2015)	Vulnerable	Number of speakers includes both Montana and Oklahoma dialects.
Chickasaw language	75 native speakers (2017)	Severely endangered	
Chinook Jargon language	640 (2019)	Critically endangered	
Choctaw language (Louisiana)	9,600 native speakers (2015)	Vulnerable	Number of speakers includes all Choctaw dialects.
Choctaw language (Mississippi)	9,600 native speakers (2015)	Vulnerable	Number of speakers includes all Choctaw dialects.
Choctaw language (Oklahoma)	9,600 native speakers (2015)	Vulnerable	Number of speakers includes all Choctaw dialects.
Cocopa language (Arizona)	370 in USA (2015), 145 in Mexico	Severely endangered	
Coeur d'Alene language	4 (2007)	Critically endangered	
Comanche language	100 (2007)	Severely endangered	
Creek language	4,500 native speakers (2015)	Vulnerable	Also called the Muscogee language.
Crow language	3,500 native speakers (2007)	Vulnerable	
Gros Ventre language	45 (2013)	Critically endangered	The last fluent speaker died in 2007.
Gwich'in language (United States)	560 (2013)	Severely endangered	
Halkomelem language	260 in Canada (2014), 25 in USA (1997)	Severely endangered	Primarily in Canada
Hän language (United States)	20 (2007)	Critically endangered	
Havasupai language	145 (2015)	Definitely endangered	
Hawaiian language	24,000 native speakers (2008)	Vulnerable	
Hawai'i Sign Language	30 (2013)	Critically endangered	The few elderly signers are bilingual with the dominant ASL
Hidatsa language	200 native speakers (2007)	Vulnerable	
Hopi language	6,780 native speakers (2010)	Vulnerable	
Hualapai language	300 (2015)	Vulnerable	
Ingalik language	40 native speakers (2015)	Critically endangered	Also called The Deg Xinag language
Ipai language	6 native speakers (2007)	Critically endangered	
Isleño Spanish	50 native speakers (2020)	Critically endangered	
Jemez language	3,000 (2007)	Vulnerable	
Jicarilla Apache language	510 native speakers (2015)	Severely endangered	
Kalispel-Pend d'Oreille	70 native speakers (2013)	Critically endangered	Montana Salish language.
Karuk language	12 native speakers, 30 L2 (2007)	Severely endangered	
Kashaya language	24 native speakers (2007)	Critically endangered	
Kawaiisu language	5 native speakers (2005)	Critically endangered	
Kickapoo language (Kansas)	1,141 native speakers in USA (2013)	Vulnerable	There are 420 speakers in Mexico but the number is mixed with Sauk and Fox (2010).
Kickapoo language (Oklahoma)	1,141 native speakers in USA (2013)	Vulnerable	There are 420 speakers in Mexico but the number is mixed with Sauk and Fox (2010).
Kickapoo language (Texas)	1,141 native speakers in USA (2013)	Vulnerable	There are 420 speakers in Mexico but the number is mixed with Sauk and Fox (2010).
Kiowa language	100, all levels; 20 first-language speakers	Severely endangered	
Koasati language (Louisiana)	350	Definitely endangered	
Koasati language (Texas)	50	Definitely endangered	
Konkow language	32	Critically endangered	
Koyukon language	65	Critically endangered	
Kutenai language	345 (2010-2016)	Severely endangered	Primarily in Canada
Kwak'wala language	450 (2016)	Critically endangered	Primarily in Canada
Louisiana Creole language	9,600 native speakers (2010)	Severely endangered	
Louisiana French language	150,000 to 200,000 native speakers (2012)		
Makah language		Critically endangered	
Maliseet-Passamaquoddy language		Severely endangered	
Maricopa language		Severely endangered	
Massachusett language	5 child speakers; 400 adult learners	Vulnerable	Current attempts at revival; Bible translated into the language in 1663
Menominee language		Critically endangered	
Mescalero-Chiricahua Apache language (New Mexico)		Definitely endangered	
Mescalero-Chiricahua Apache language (Oklahoma)		Critically endangered	
Micmac language (Massachusetts)		Vulnerable	
Mikasuki language		Vulnerable	
Mohave language (Arizona)		Severely endangered	
Mohave language (California)		Severely endangered	
Mohawk language (Akwesasne, St. Regis)		Vulnerable	
Mohawk language (Ganienkeh)		Vulnerable	
Mohawk language (Kanatsiohareke)		Vulnerable	
Mono language (Eastern)		Critically endangered	
Mono language (Western)		Critically endangered	
Montana Salish language		Critically endangered	
Munsee language (United States)		Critically endangered	
Navajo language		Vulnerable	
Nez Perce language		Critically endangered	
Inupiat language ()		Severely endangered	North Alaskan: Kotzebue Sound & North Slope
Northern Haida language		Critically endangered	Primarily in Canada
Northern Paiute language (Idaho)		Critically endangered	
Northern Paiute language (Nevada)		Definitely endangered	
Northern Paiute language (Oregon)		Critically endangered	
Northern Straits Salish language		Critically endangered	
O'odham language (Akimel)		Vulnerable	
O'odham language (Tohono)		Vulnerable	
Ojibwe language		Vulnerable	
Okanagan language		Definitely endangered	Primarily in Canada
Omaha-Ponca language		Critically endangered	
Oneida language (New York)		Critically endangered	Also in Canada
Oneida language (Wisconsin)		Critically endangered	
Onondaga language (New York)		Critically endangered	Also in Canada
Osage language		Vulnerable	
Ottawa language (Michigan)		Critically endangered	Also in Canada
Pacific Gulf Yupik language		Severely endangered	
Panamint language		Critically endangered	
Pawnee language		Critically endangered	
Picuris language		Vulnerable	
Plains Sign Talk		Critically endangered	
Potawatomi language (Kansas)		Critically endangered	
Potawatomi language (Michigan)		Critically endangered	
Potawatomi language (Oklahoma)		Critically endangered	
Potawatomi language (Wisconsin)		Critically endangered	
Quechan language		Definitely endangered	
Rio Grande Keresan language		Definitely endangered	Keresan languages
Sahaptin language		Severely endangered	
Sauk-Fox language		Critically endangered	
Seneca language (United States)		Severely endangered	
Seward Peninsula Inupiaq language (King Island)		Critically endangered	Inupiat language
Seward Peninsula Inupiaq language (Little Diomede Island)		Critically endangered	Inupiat language
Seward Peninsula Inupiaq language (Norton Sound)		Critically endangered	Inupiat language
Shawnee language		Vulnerable	
Shoshoni language (Idaho)		Vulnerable	
Shoshoni language (Nevada)		Vulnerable	
Shoshoni language (Wyoming)		Vulnerable	
Sioux language		Vulnerable	Dakota (Santee-Sisseton), Nakota (Yankton-Yanktonai), and Lakota
Southern Paiute language		Severely endangered	
Southern Sierra Miwok language		Critically endangered	
Southern Tiwa language (Isleta Pueblo)		Definitely endangered	
Southern Tiwa language (Sandia Pueblo)		Definitely endangered	
Spokane language		Critically endangered	Interior Salish languages, Montana Salish language
Straits Salish language		Severely endangered	Primarily in Canada
Tanacross language		Critically endangered	
Tanaina language		Severely endangered	
Tanana language		Critically endangered	
Taos language		Definitely endangered	
Texas German	6,000	Critically endangered	
Tewa language (Arizona)		Definitely endangered	
Tewa language (New Mexico)		Severely endangered	
Tipai language (United States)		Severely endangered	
Tlingit language (United States)		Critically endangered	
Upland Yuman language		Vulnerable	
Upper Kuskokwim language		Critically endangered	
Upper Tanana language (United States)		Critically endangered	
Valley Yokuts		Severely endangered	
Washo language		Severely endangered	
Western Apache language		Vulnerable	
Winnebago language (Nebraska)		Severely endangered	
Winnebago language (Wisconsin)		Severely endangered	
Yaqui language (United States)		Definitely endangered	
Yavapai language		Severely endangered	
Zuni language		Vulnerable	
