= List of endangered languages in Central America =

Language Endangerment Status by UNESCO Atlas of the World's Languages in Danger category

Extinct (EX)
- Extinct (EX): (lists)

Endangered
- Critically Endangered (CR); Severely Endangered (SE); Definitely Endangered (DE); Vulnerable (VU): (list); (list); (list); (list)

Safe
- Safe (NE): no list
- Other categories
- Revived (RE); Constructed (CL): (list); (list)
- Related topics: Atlas of the World's Languages in Danger; Endangered Languages Project; Ethnologue; Unclassified language; List of languages by total number of speakers
- UNESCO Atlas of the World's; Languages in Danger categories

An endangered language is a language that it is at risk of falling out of use, generally because it has few surviving speakers. If it loses all of its native speakers, it becomes an extinct language. UNESCO defines four levels of language endangerment between "safe" (not endangered) and "extinct":

- Vulnerable
- Definitely endangered
- Severely endangered
- Critically endangered

Central America (Spanish: Centroamérica or América Central) is a central geographic region of the Americas. It is variably defined either as the southern portion of North America, which connects with South America on the southeast, or as a region of the American continent in its own right.

Country	Language	Ethnonym	Speakers	Source
Costa Rica	Boruca		5 women 30 to 35 nonfluent speakers	(1986 SIL) (1991)
El Salvador	Pipil		20; 196,576	(1987) (1987)
Guatemala	Itza'		12; 1,800	(1986 SIL) (2001)
Nicaragua	Rama		24; 900	(1989 J Holm) (2000 C Grinevald)
Panama	San Miguel Creole French		3	(1999 SIL)
