= Symbiosism =

Symbiosism is a philosophical concept about the mind and man's place in nature. It is a Darwinian theory which considers language an organism residing in the human brain and claims that language is a memetic life form. Symbiosism is defined by the Leiden school.

== Overview ==
Memes are meanings, i.e. iso-functional neuroanatomical constructs corresponding to signs in the sense of Ferdinand de Saussure. Meanings thrive, replicate incessantly and constitute the essence of language. An essential characteristic of memes is that linguistic meanings have the nature of nonconstructible sets in the mathematical sense and do not abide by constraints governing Aristotelian logic, such as the principle of the excluded middle. The Leiden conception of the meme contrasts with the Oxford definition as a unit of imitation, a behavioral notion that in Leiden is captured by the term meme. The fecundity of memes as replicators and their fidelity of replication are limited, more so in pre-linguistic contexts.

Language is a mutualist symbiont and enters into a mutually beneficial relationship with its hominid host. Humans propagate language, whilst language furnishes the conceptual universe that guides and shapes the thinking of the hominid host. Language enhances the Darwinian fitness of the human species. Yet individual grammatical and lexical meanings and configurations of memes mediated by language may be either beneficial or deleterious to the biological host. The symbiosis is rendered more complex than just simple mutualism, both by the physiological discrepancy between language as an overall condition and the nature of individual ideas conveyed through language, as well as by the ecological difference between vertically and horizontally transmitted memes. The symbiotic theory of language propounded by George van Driem grew out of the Leiden school of language evolution, fathered by Frederik Kortlandt.

== Resources ==
- van Driem, George (2001). Languages of the Himalayas: An Ethnolinguistic Handbook of the Greater Himalayan Region : Containing an Introduction to the Symbiotic Theory of Language (2 vol). Brill. p. 1412. ISBN 90-04-12062-9.
- van Driem, George. 2003. The Language Organism: The Leiden theory of language evolution, in Jiří Mírovský, Anna Kotěšovcová and Eva Hajičová, eds., Proceedings of the XVIIth International Congress of Linguists, Prague, July 24–29, 2003. Prague: Matfyzpress vydavatelství Matematicko-fyzikální fakulty Univerzity Karlovy.
- van Driem, George. 2004. Language as organism: A brief introduction to the Leiden theory of language evolution, pp. 1–9 in Ying-chin Lin, Fang-min Hsu, Chun-chih Lee, Jackson T.-S. Sun, Hsiu-fang Yang and Dah-an Ho, eds., Studies on Sino-Tibetan Languages: Papers in Honor of Professor Hwang-cherng Gong on his Seventieth Birthday (Language and Linguistics Monograph Series W-4). Taipei: Institute of Linguistics, Academia
- van Driem, George. 2005. The language organism: The Leiden theory of language evolution, pp. 331–340 in James W. Minett and William S-Y. Wang, eds., Language Acquisition, Change and Emergence: Essays in Evolutionary Linguistics. Hong Kong: City University of Hong Kong Press.
- Kortlandt, Frederik Herman Henri. 1985. A parasitological view of non-constructible sets, pp. 477–483 in Ursula Pieper and Gerhard Stickel, eds., Studia linguistica diachronica et synchronica: Werner Winter sexagenario anno MCMLXXXIII gratis animis ab eius collegis, amicis discipulisque oblata. Berlin: Mouton de Gruyter.
- Kortlandt, Frederik Herman Henri. 1998. Syntax and semantics in the history of Chinese, Journal of Intercultural Studies, 5: 167-176
- Kortlandt, Frederik Herman Henri. 2003. The origin and nature of the linguistic parasite, pp. 241–244 in Brigitte Bauer and Georges-Jean Pinault, eds., Language in Time and Space: A Festschrift for Werner Winter on the Occasion of his 80th Birthday. Berlin: Mouton de Gruyter
- Salverda, Reinier. 1998. Is language a virus? Reflections on the use of biological metaphors in the study of language, pp. 191–209 in Mark Janse and An Verlinden, eds., Productivity and Creativity. Studies in General and Descriptive Linguistics in Honor of E.M. Uhlenbeck. Berlin: Mouton de Gruyter.
- Salverda, Reinier. 2003. Letter to the Editor, New Scientist (1 February 2003), 2380: 25.
- Wiedenhof, Jeroen Maarten. 1996. Nexus and the birth of syntax, Acta Linguistica Hafniensia, 28: 139-150
