= Father tongue hypothesis =

Hypothesis on language affiliation

Language families and Y-DNA distributions in Africa

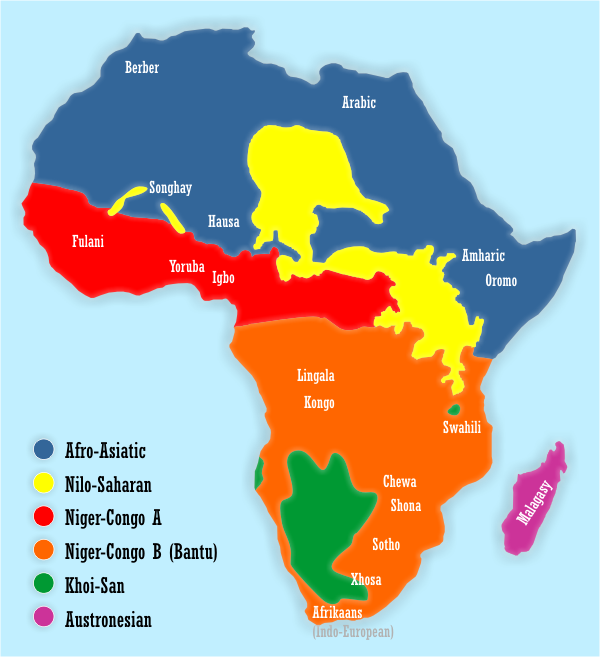
Distribution of language families

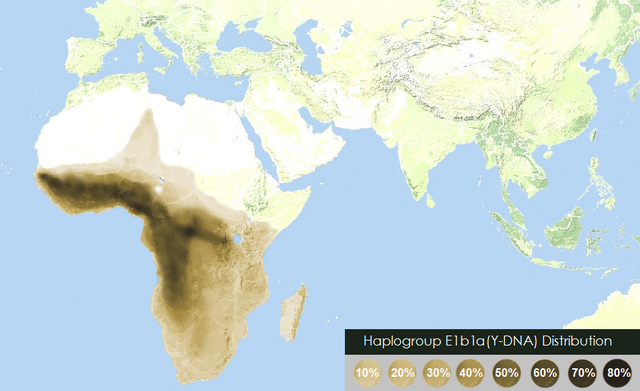
Distribution of Y-DNA:E1b1a (related to Niger-Congo languages)

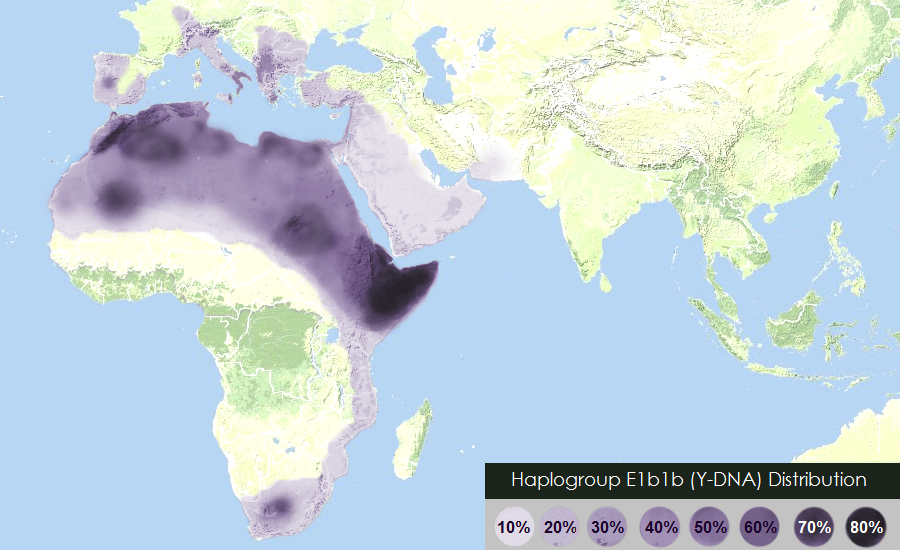
Distribution of Y-DNA:E1b1b (related to Afro-Asiatic languages)

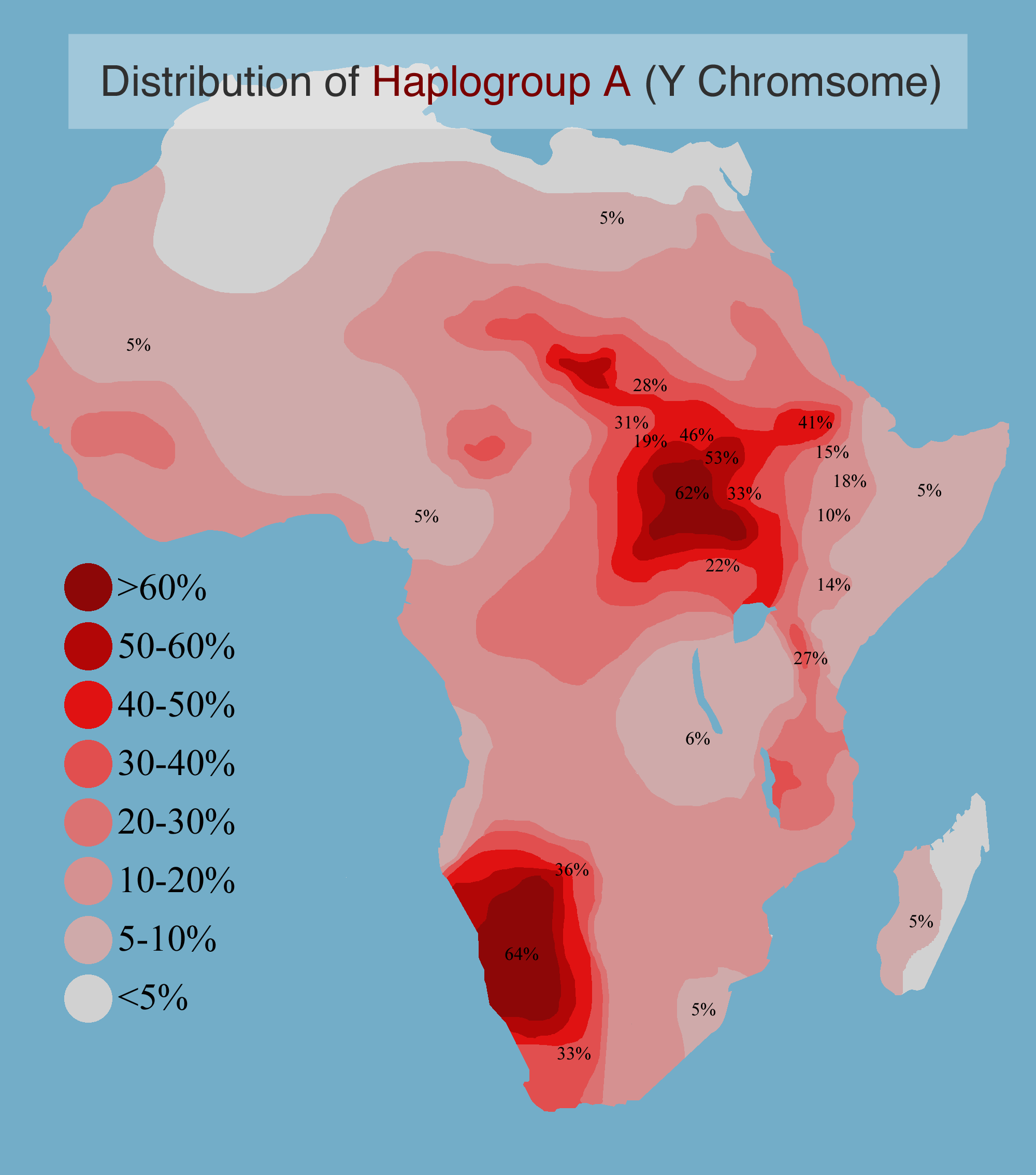
Distribution of Y-DNA:A (related to Khoisan languages and part of Nilo-Saharan languages)

The father tongue hypothesis proposes the idea that humans tend to speak their father's language. The hypothesis is based on a 1997 proposal that linguistic affiliation correlates more closely with Y-chromosomal variation than with mitochondrial DNA variation. The initial work was performed on African and European samples by a team of population geneticists, led by Laurent Excoffier. On the basis of these, and similar findings by other geneticists, the hypothesis was elaborated by the Dutch historical linguist George van Driem in 2010 that the teaching by a mother of her spouse's tongue to her children is a mechanism by which language has preferentially been spread over time. Focusing on prehistoric language shift in already settled areas, examples worldwide show that as little as 10–20% of prehistoric male immigration can (but need not) cause a language switch, indicating an elite imposition such as may have happened with the appearance of the first farmers or metalworkers in the Neolithic, Bronze and Iron Ages.

== Early autosomal research ==
Before the discovery of mtDNA variation and Y-chromosomal variation in the 1980s and 1990s, respectively, it was not possible to distinguish male from female effects in population genetics. Instead, researchers had to rely on autosomal variation, starting with the first population genetic study using blood groups by Ludwik Hirszfeld in 1919. Later other genetic polymorphisms were used, for example polymorphisms of proteins of the blood plasma, polymorphisms of human lymphocyte antigens or polymorphisms of immunoglobulins. On this basis, correlations between languages and genetic variation occasionally were proposed, but sex-specific questions could not be addressed until the 1990s, when both mtDNA and Y-chromosomal variation in humans became available for study.

== Origin ==
The Y chromosome follows patrilineal inheritance, meaning it is only passed on among males, from father to son. Mitochondrial DNA on the other hand follows matrilineal inheritance, meaning it is only passed on from the mother to her children and from her daughters to their children. In 1997 Laurent Excoffier, his student Estella Poloni and his team reported that they had found a strong correlation between the Y-chromosomal sequence P49a,f/Taql variation and linguistics, while not being able to find such a correspondence for the mtDNA variation. Poloni et al. proposed the possible consequences of such a correlation, i.e. the Father Tongue hypothesis:

As a consequence, the female-specific diversity of our genome would fit less well with geography and linguistics than would our male-specific component. [...] If that were to prove to be the case, then the common belief that we speak our mother's tongue should be revised in favor of the concept of a 'father's tongue'.

—

Estella Poloni also presented the Father Tongue hypothesis at an international conference in Paris in April 2000.

On the basis of this population genetic work, the Dutch historical linguist George van Driem elaborated the Father Tongue hypothesis in his ethnolinguistic publications and in population genetic publications which he has co-authored. At the Indo-Pacific Prehistory Association conference in Taipei in 2002 he proposed that

a mother teaching her children their father's tongue has been a recurrent, ubiquitous and prevalent pattern throughout linguistic history, […] some of the mechanisms of language change over time are likely to be inherent to the dynamics of this pathway of transmission. Such correlations are observed worldwide.

—

== Discovery of Y-chromosomal markers for languages ==
The next development was the discovery of specific Y-chromosomal markers linked to a language. These Y-chromosomal variants do not cause language change, but happened to be carried by the historic or prehistoric male speakers spreading the language. These language-specific Y-chromosomal markers create correlations such as those observed by Poloni et al. 1997, and furthermore allow the geographic extent, the time depth and the male immigration level underlying an unrecorded (prehistoric) language change to be determined.

== Examples of father tongues ==
Distributions of Uralic languages and Y-DNA:N

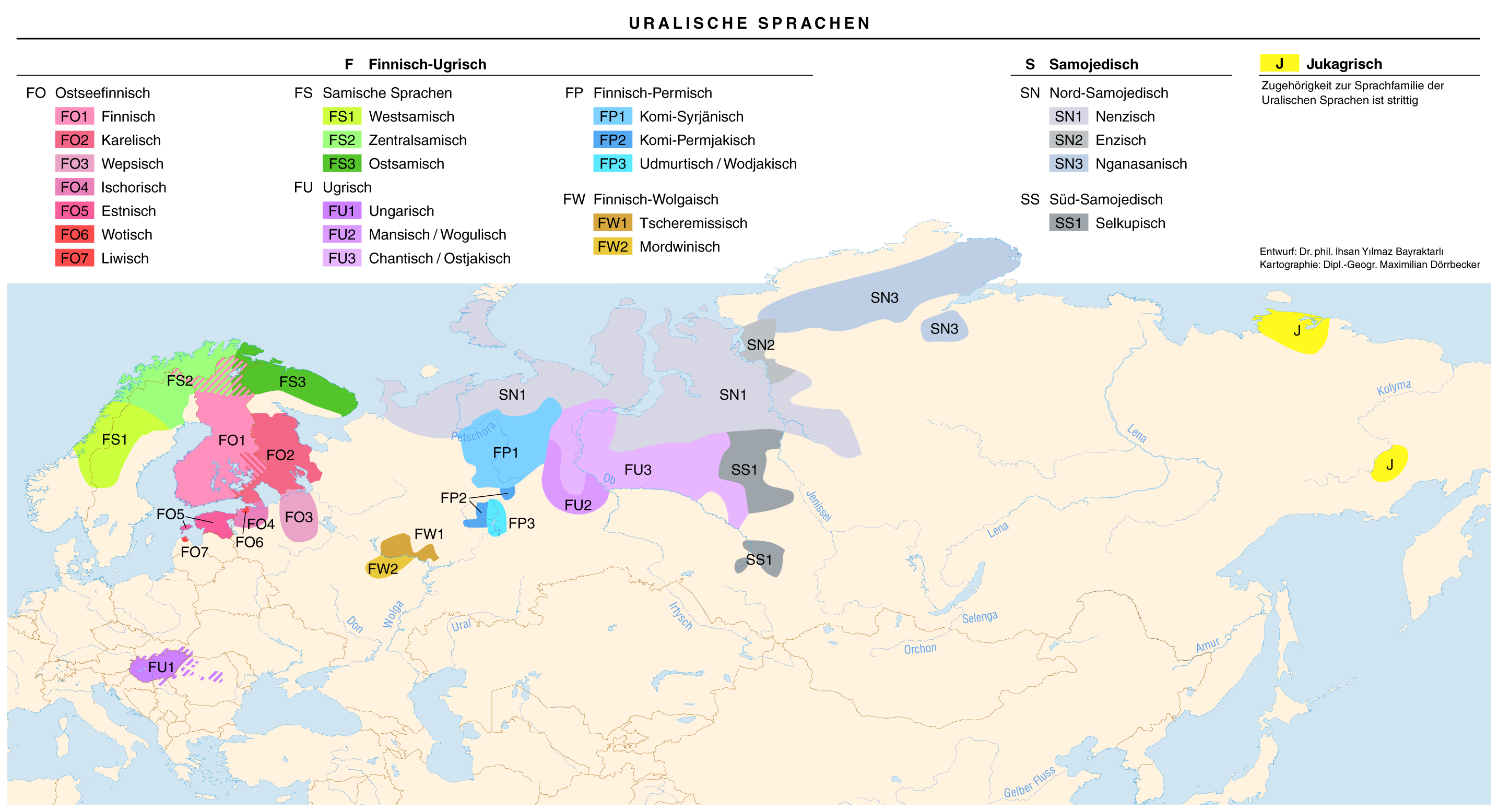
Distribution of Uralic languages (and Yukaghir languages)

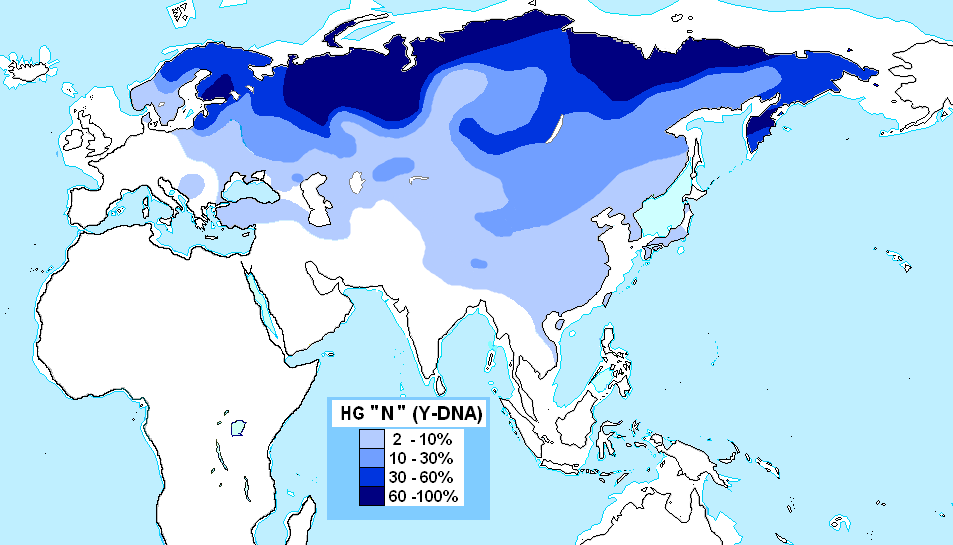
Distribution of Haplogroup N (Y-DNA)

There are several salient examples where the prehistoric diffusion of a language family correlates strongly with the diffusion of Y-chromosomal haplogroups.

- The dispersal of Indo-Europeans from a proposed homeland in the Pontic–Caspian steppe according to the Kurgan hypothesis is suggested to be linked to the spread of the R haplogroup subclade, R1a1, into Europe. R1a1 may also reflect the arrival of the Indo-Aryans into northern India.
- The Y-chromosomal lineage L could potentially reflect an earlier patrilingual dispersal of the proposed Elamo-Dravidian family emanating from a region in modern-day Iran.
- Austroasiatic speakers show a high frequency of the O2a haplogroup subclade. For example, Munda speakers in north and northeast India show high frequencies of O2a, not found in their regional neighbours who speak languages other than Austroasiatic, whilst their mtDNA haplogroups seem to be those frequent in their region independent of language affinity.
- A population genetic study of 23 Han Chinese populations has shown that the Han expansion southward during the sinification of what today is southern China was predominantly male-biased and is an uncontroversial example of the Father Tongue hypothesis.
- It has also been suggested that Bantu and other Niger-Congo languages correlate well with Y-chromosomal haplogroups.
- The spread of Afroasiatic languages has been linked to the expansion of E1b1b haplogroup.

== Implications ==
The Father Tongue hypothesis has far-reaching implications for several processes in linguistics such as language change, language acquisition and sociolinguistics. The Father Tongue hypothesis also has implications for language acquisition, as the hypothesis suggests an evolutionary explanation for why females may be better in some aspects of language performance and acquisition.

Van Driem interpreted the correlation of Y-chromosomal haplogroups and language families as indicating that the spread of language families was often mediated by male-biased migration, whether these intrusions were martial or something less spectacular. He conjectured that the majority of language communities spoke father tongues rather than mother tongues.

The Father Tongue hypothesis has implications for linguists' understanding of language change. It must be assumed that the dynamics of language change whereby mothers pass on the language of their spouses to their offspring differ from the dynamics of language change in a monolingual community and even from the dynamics of change in a bilingual community where mothers pass on their own language to their children. As a consequence, such dynamics can introduce a discontinuity with the past. For example, it has been observed that Michif, genetically an Algonquian language (like Plains Cree), was relexified by Métis women with Métis French, the language of their husbands, and so the genetic affinity of Michif has come to be almost unidentifiable. If the process of relexification went beyond the possibility of linguistic reconstruction, the dynamics of such a process may obscure the true linguistic history of a community.

== Exceptions ==
Genetics does not determine the language spoken by a human being, and the link between Y-chromosomal haplogroups and linguistic affinities is an observed correlation and not a causal link. While father tongues predominate, exceptions to father tongues exist in the world. One possible exception is the Balti in northern Pakistan.

The mtDNA haplogroups most frequent among Balti are the same as those of the neighbouring Tibetan communities, whereas the Y-chromosomal haplogroups most frequent in Balti males appear to have entered Baltistan from the west with the introduction of Islam. The Balti speak one of the most conservative Tibetan languages. The language of the Balti corresponds to the mtDNA and not to the Y chromosome and is in effect a salient example of a mother tongue.

== See also ==
- Language family
- Indo-European migrations
- Haplogroup R1
