= Tilung language =

Kiranti language of Nepal

Tilung
- तिलुङ
- Native to: Nepal
- Region: Sagarmatha Zone
- Native speakers: 20 (2015)
- Language family: Sino-Tibetan: Tibeto-Burman; Mahakiranti (?); Kiranti; Central or Western (?); Tilung
- Dialects: Choskule; Dorungkecha; Tilung proper

Language codes
- ISO 639-3: tij
- Glottolog: tilu1238
- ELP: Tilung

Tilung (Nepali: तिलुङ) is a moribund Kiranti language spoken in Nepal. According to Opgenort, Tilung occupies an independent position within the Kiranti language family, and can be placed roughly between the Western languages Thulung, Khaling and Dumi, on the one side, and the Southern Central Kiranti languages Kulung, Chamling and Bantawa, on the other. Even though Tilung is spoken directly to the south of the Wambule speaking area, Tilung and Wambule are not mutually intelligible. The Choskule and Dorungkecha "dialects" may be related languages.

== Locations ==
Tilung is spoken by a few elderly people living in several small settlements in Chyasmitar (च्यास्मिटार) Village Development Committee (VDC), southern Khotang (खोटाङ) district, Sagarmatha Zone, Nepal. It is located on the northern bank of the Sunkosi (सुनकोशी) River, on the last ridge of the Halesi Range. According to the 2001 Census of Nepal (with data from 1991), Chyasmitar VDC had a population of 2,167 persons living in 412 households, and there were 310 speakers of Tilung. However, Opgenort's more recent investigations have shown that there are only a few fluent speakers of Tilung remaining. These people are all older than 60 years and fully bilingual in Nepali, which is the dominant language among the Tilung ethnic community.

== Sources ==
- Rai, Tara Mani Rai.2017.A SOCIOLINGUISTIC SURVEY OF TILUNG: A TIBETO-BURMAN LANGUAGE. Central Department of Linguistics, TU. https://portal.tu.edu.np/downloads/Tilung_2023_09_30_11_25_30.pdf
