= List of languages by number of phonemes =

This partial list of languages is sorted by a partial count of phonemes (generally ignoring tone, stress, and diphthongs). Languages in this list cannot be directly compared: Counts of the phonemes in the inventory of a language can differ radically between sources, occasionally by a factor of several hundred percent. For instance, Received Pronunciation of English has been claimed to have anywhere between 11 and 27 vowels, whereas West ǃXoon has been analyzed as having anywhere from 87 to 164 consonants.

== List ==
This list features standard dialects of languages. The languages are classified under primary language families, which may be hypothesized, marked in italics, but do not include ones discredited by mainstream scholars (e.g. Niger–Congo but not Altaic). DarkLight-shaded cells indicate extinct languages. The parenthesized righthand side of expressions indicates marginal phonemes.

List of languages
Language	Language family	Numbers of phonemes			Notes	Ref
Language	Language family	Total	Consonants	Vowels, tones and stress	Notes	Ref
Arabic (Standard)	Afroasiatic	34	28	6	Number of phonemes in Modern Standard Arabic, without counting the long vowels /eː/ and /oː/ which are phonemic in Mashriqi dialects or other dialectal phonemes.	
Amharic	Afroasiatic	37	30	7		
Archi	Northeast Caucasian	108/99 + (2)	82/80	26/19 + (2)	Count differs from source to source	
ꞌAreꞌare	Austronesian	15	10	5		
Bengali	Indo-Aryan	36	29	7		
Bintulu	Austronesian	25	21	4		
Bukawa	Austronesian	37	30	7		
Buli	Austronesian	23 + (1)	18 + (1)	5		
Cantonese	Sino-Tibetan	36 + (1)	19 + (1)	11 + 6		
Cèmuhî	Austronesian	26	19	7		
Cheke Holo	Austronesian	37	32	5		
Classical Tibetan	Sino-Tibetan	35	30	5		
Danish	Indo-European	44	18	26		
Dawan	Austronesian	18 + (1)	11 + (1)	7		
Enggano	Austronesian	36 + (6)	10 + (6)	26		
English	Indo-European	44	24	20		
Finnish	Uralic	21 + (4)	13 + (4)	8		
French	Indo-European	34 + (1)	20 + (1)	14	Vowels have been merged into /a/ and /ɛ̃/, respectively, in Parisian French. /ŋ/ is used for English loanwords.	
Garo	Sino-Tibetan	23 + (1)	18 + (1)	5		
German	Indo-European	39	25	14		
Gilbertese	Austronesian	15	10	5		
Greek	Indo-European	23	18	5		
Hamer	Afroasiatic	39 + (6)	26 + (1)	13 + (5)	The language includes five diphthongs	
Hausa	Afroasiatic	40	30	10		
Hawaiian	Austronesian	13	8	5	Long vowels are considered to be sequences of vowels and so are not counted as phonemes.	
Hindi	Indo-European	44 + (5)	33 + (5)	11		
Hungarian	Uralic	39	25	14	The vowel phonemes can be grouped as pairs of short and long vowels such as o and ó. Most of the pairs have an almost similar pronunciation and vary significantly only in their duration. However, pairs a/á and e/é differ both in closedness and length.	
Italian	Indo-European	30 + (1)	23 + (1)	7		
Japanese	Japonic	20 + (9)	15 + (9)	5	The nine marginal consonants are considered allophones and occur as contrastive only in loanwords and some Sino-Japanese vocabulary.	
Karbi	Sino-Tibetan	26 + (2)	18	8 + (2)		
Kelabit	Austronesian	25 + (1)	19 + (1)	6		
Kilivila	Austronesian	24	19	5		
Korean	Koreanic	31	21	10	Vowels /ø/ and /y/ continue to be used only by older speakers, and have been replaced with /we/ and /wi/, respectively. Most younger speakers have merged /ɛ/ into /e/.	
Kosraean	Austronesian	47	35	12		
Lahu	Sino-Tibetan	33	24	9		
Lauje	Austronesian	18	13	5		
Lepcha	Sino-Tibetan	40	32	8		
Lisu	Sino-Tibetan	41 + (3)	31 + (3)	10		
Lonwolwol	Austronesian	38	25	13		
Malagasy	Austronesian	23	19	4		
Malay	Austronesian	24 + (5)	18 + (5)	6		
Maltese	Afroasiatic	35	24	11		
Marathi	Indo-European	50	36	14		
Meitei	Sino-Tibetan	31	25	6		
Middle English	Indo-European	42	23	19	Late Middle English	
Modern Hebrew	Afroasiatic	30	25 + (2)	5		
Mongsen Ao	Sino-Tibetan	25	20	5		
Muna	Austronesian	30	25	5		
Narom	Austronesian	30	24	6		
Nemi	Austronesian	48	43	5		
Norman	Indo-European	48	23	25		
Nuaulu	Austronesian	16	11	5		
Nuer	Nilo-Saharan	43 + (5)	20 + (5)	23		
Old English	Indo-European	37	19	18	This inventory of Late Old English includes two contrastive long diphthongs, which probably existed. Some scholars suggest the existence of /ʃ/ and two affricates, but this viewpoint is controversial, and the phonemes are not counted here.	
Oromo	Afroasiatic	34	24	10		
Polish	Indo-European	37	29	8		
Portuguese	Indo-European	27 + (10)	19 + (4)	8 + (6)	Some may argue that /kʷ/ and /gʷ/ are phonemic, and vowel phonemes may be counted using nasal vowels as well.	
Rotokas	North Bougainville	11/21	6	5/10		
Russian	Indo-European	41/42	36	5/6	Some linguists view /ɨ/ as separate phoneme, however the prevailing view is that [ɨ] is an allophone of /i/ after 'hard' (not palatalized) consonants. See Russian phonology.	
Saʼban	Austronesian	32	22	10		
Saaroa	Austronesian	17	13	4		
Sinhala	Indo-European	60	40	20		
Somali	Afroasiatic	31	21	10		
Spanish	Indo-European	22 + (2)	17 + (2)	5	Most speakers only have 22 phonemes, as /θ/ is only present in Peninsular Spanish and /ʎ/ is only preserved in some Peninsular and Andean dialects.	
Thai	Kra–Dai	47	21	21 + 5	Short and long vowels are considered distinct phonemes.	
Thao	Austronesian	23 + (1)	20	3 + (1)		
Tswana	Niger–Congo	35 + (2)	28 + (2)	7		
Turkish	Turkic	31 + (1)	23 + (1)	8	Some consider ⟨ğ⟩ to represent a separate phoneme.	
Ubykh	Northwest Caucasian	86-88	84	2-4	4 consonants are only found in loanwords.	
Vaeakau-Taumako	Austronesian	21 + (3)	16 + (3)	5		
Vietnamese	Austroasiatic	34 + (1)	20 + (1)	14	While some dialects distinguish ⟨tr⟩ and ⟨ch⟩, the distinction is missing in the Hanoi dialect, described here.	
Waimoa	Austronesian	33 + (3)	28 + (3)	5		
Wambule	Sino-Tibetan	44	33	11		
Wayan	Austronesian	24	19	5		
Wolio	Austronesian	36	31	5		

== See also ==
- UCLA Phonological Segment Inventory Database
