= Chyasmitar =

Former Village Development Committee in Nepal

Chyasmitar च्यास्मिटार
- Village Development Committee
- Location in Nepal
- Coordinates: 27.17°N 86.54°E
- Country: Nepal
- Zone: Sagarmatha Zone
- District: Khotang District

Population (1991)
  - Total: 2,167
- Time zone: UTC+5:45 (Nepal Time)

Chyasmitar is a town and Village Development Committee in Khotang District in the Sagarmatha Zone of eastern Nepal. At the time of the 1991 Nepal census it had a population of 2,167 persons living in 412 individual households. The Tilung language is spoken in Chyasmitar.
