= List of Native American languages acquired by children =

This is a list of Native American languages acquired by children, thus this list contains the most healthy Native American languages within the confines of the United States. Still, only two can boast more than 20,000 speakers (Navajo and Cherokee).

- Arapaho – In 2008, it was reported that a school had been opened to teach the language to children. Currently, the language may be acquired by children, for a population estimate as recent as 2007 lists an increase to 1,000 speakers and notes that the language is in use in schools, bilingual education efforts begun on Wind River Reservation in the 1980s and the Arapaho Language Lodge, a successful immersion program, was established in 1993. "The Arapaho Project" is an effort made by the Arapaho people to promote and restore their traditional language and culture.
- Cherokee –
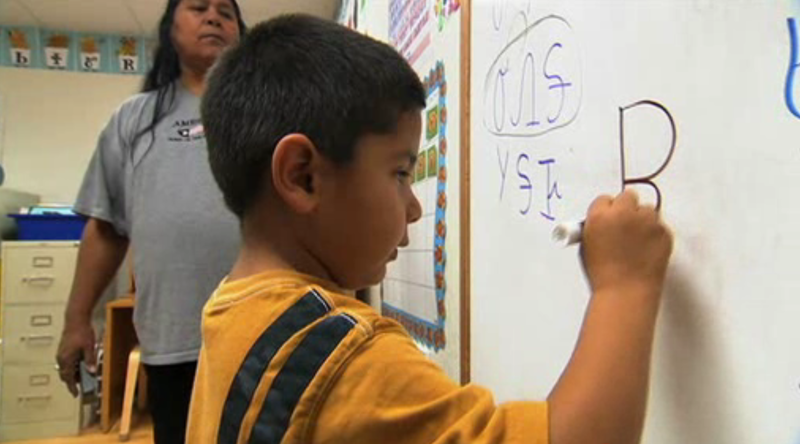
  Oklahoma Cherokee language immersion school student writing in the Cherokee syllabary.
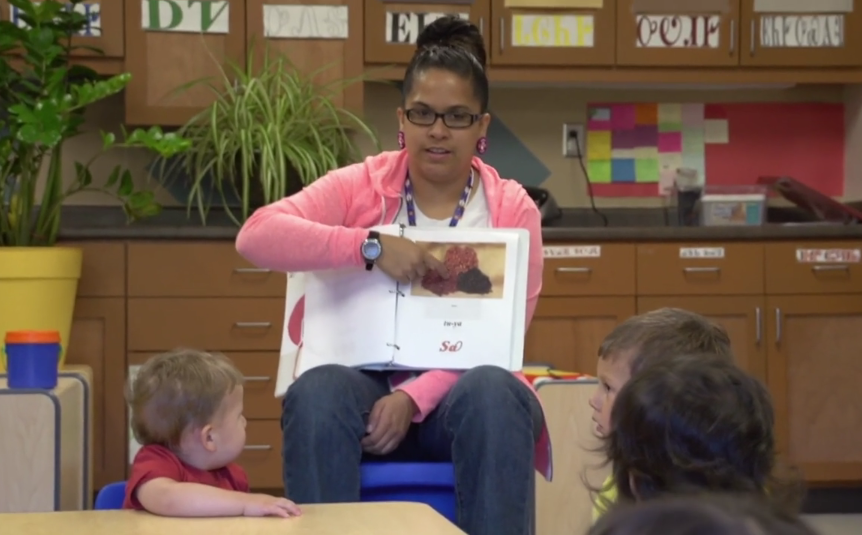
  The Cherokee language taught to preschoolers as a first language, at New Kituwah Academy
  The Cherokee Nation instigated a 10-year language preservation plan that involved growing new fluent speakers of the Cherokee language from childhood on up through school immersion programs, as well as a collaborative community effort to continue to use the language at home. This plan was part of an ambitious goal that in 50 years, 80 percent or more of the Cherokee people will be fluent in the language. The Cherokee Preservation Foundation has invested $4.5 million into opening schools, training teachers, and developing curricula for language education, as well as initiating community gatherings where the language can be actively used. They have accomplished: "Curriculum development, teaching materials and teacher training for a total immersion program for children, beginning when they are preschoolers, that enables them to learn Cherokee as their first language. The participating children and their parents learn to speak and read together. The Tribe operates the Kituwah Academy." Formed in 2006, the Kituwah Preservation & Education Program (KPEP) on the Qualla Boundary focuses on language immersion programs for children from birth to fifth grade, developing cultural resources for the general public and community language programs to foster the Cherokee language among adults. There is also a Cherokee language immersion school in Tahlequah, Oklahoma that educates students from pre-school through eighth grade. Several universities offer Cherokee as a second language, including the University of Oklahoma, Northeastern State University, and Western Carolina University. Western Carolina University (WCU) has partnered with the Eastern Band of Cherokee Indians (EBCI) to promote and restore the language through the school's Cherokee Studies program, which offers classes in and about the language and culture of the Cherokee Indians. WCU and the EBCI have initiated a ten-year language revitalization plan, consisting of: (1) a continuation of the improvement and expansion of the EBCI Atse Kituwah Cherokee Language Immersion School, (2) continued development of Cherokee language learning resources, and (3) building of Western Carolina University programs to offer a more comprehensive language training curriculum.
- Chickasaw – There were purportedly children learning Chickasaw as a first language in 2006, though this is perhaps not the case.
- Choctaw – The School of the Choctaw Language offers classes to any interested persons. Like Chickasaw, Choctaw was reportedly acquired by children in Oklahoma as recently as 2006.
- Crow – R. Graczyk claims in his A Grammar of Crow (2007) that "[u]nlike many other native languages of North America in general, and the northern plain in particular, the Crow language still exhibits considerable vitality: there are fluent speakers of all ages, and at least some children are still acquiring Crow as their first language." Many of the younger population who do not speak Crow are able to understand it. Almost all of those who do speak Crow are also bilingual in English. Graczyk cites the reservation community as the reason for both the high level of bilingual Crow-English speakers and the continued use and prevalence of the Crow language. Daily contact with non-American Indians on the reservation for over one hundred years has led to high usage of English. Traditional culture within the community, however, has preserved the language via religious ceremonies and the traditional clan system. Currently, most speakers of Crow are 30 and older but a few younger speakers are learning it. There are increased efforts for children to learn Crow as their first language and many do on the Crow Reservation of Montana, particularly through a Crow language immersion school that was sponsored in 2012. Development for the language includes a Crow language dictionary and portions of the Bible published from 1980 to 2007. The current literacy rate is around 1–5% for first language speakers and 75–100% for second language learners. Teens are immersed in Crow at the Apsaalooke language camp sponsored by the Crow Nation.
- Dakota – The language is taught to children through The Wicoie Nadagikendan Early Childhood Urban Immersion Program. In 1998, the Alliance of Early Childhood Professionals began the "Taking the Lead" leadership project to raise money for language preservation.
- Gros Ventre † – As of 2012, the White Clay Immersion School at Fort Belknap College was teaching the language to 26 students, up from 11 students in 2006.
- Hopi – Hopi and Navajo both are supported by bi-lingual education programs in Arizona.
- Lakota – There is a Lakota language program online available for children to use. There is also a Lakota Language Program with classes for children at Red Cloud Indian School.
- Mescalero-Chiricahua – There is at least one Apache language immersion school for children in Mescalero.
- Mohawk – A Mohawk language immersion school was established in 1998. Mohawk parents, concerned with the lack of culture-based education in public and parochial schools, founded the Akwesasne Freedom School in 1979. Six years later, the school implemented a Mohawk language immersion curriculum based on a traditional cycle of fifteen seasonal ceremonies, and on the Mohawk Thanksgiving Address, or Ohén:ton Karihwatékwen, “The words before all else.” Every morning, teachers and students gather in the hallway to recite the Thanksgiving Address in Mohawk.
- Muscogee Creek – The College of the Muscogee Nation offers a Mvskoke language certificate program. Tulsa public schools, the University of Oklahoma and Glenpool Library in Tulsa and the Holdenville, Okmulgee, and Tulsa Creek Indian Communities of the Muscogee (Creek) Nation offer Muskogee Creek language classes. In 2013, the Sapulpa Creek Community Center graduated a class of 14 from its Muscogee Creek language class.
- Navajo – The Navajo Nation operates Tséhootsooí Diné Bi'ólta', a Navajo language immersion school for grades K-8 in Fort Defiance, Arizona. Located on the Arizona-New Mexico border in the southeastern quarter of the Navajo Reservation, the school strives to revitalize Navajo among children of the Window Rock Unified School District. Tséhootsooí Diné Bi'ólta' has thirteen Navajo language teachers who instruct only in the Navajo language, and no English, while five English language teachers instruct in the English language. Kindergarten and first grade are taught completely in the Navajo language, while English is incorporated into the program during third grade, when it is used for about 10% of instruction.
- Ojibwe – The Waadookodaading Ojibwe Language Immersion School teaches all classes in Ojibwe only.
- Salish Ql'ispe- The Nkwusm Salish Immersion School (see: https://web.archive.org/web/20061004020749/http://salishworld.com/) is educating children and adults in Salish Ql'ispe (a.k.a. Montana Salish, Flathead Salish, and Salish Pend d'Oreille).
- Shoshoni – There is strong interest in revitalization but efforts to preserve the language are scattered with little coordination. Literacy is increasing, with a Shoshoni dictionary and Bible portions translated in 1986. As of 2012, Idaho State University offers elementary, intermediate, and conversational Shoshoni, with open-source Shosoni audio available online to complement classroom instruction, as part of its long-standing Shoshoni Language Project. Shoshoni classes are also taught as a part of the Shoshone-Bannock Tribe's Language and Culture Preservation Program. On the Wind River Reservation in Wyoming, elders have been active in digital language archiving, and Shoshoni is taught using Dr. Steven Greymorning's Accelerated Second Language Acquisition techniques. A summer program called, Shoshone/Goshute Youth Language Apprenticeship Program (SYLAP), held at the University of Utah's Center for American Indian Languages since 2009 has been featured on NPR's Weekend Edition program. Shoshoni youth serve as interns, assisting with digitization of Shoshoni language recordings and documentation from the Wick R. Miller collection, so that the materials can be made available for tribal members. The program released the first Shoshone language video game in August 2013. In July 2012, Blackfoot High School in Southeastern Idaho announced it would offer Shoshoni language classes. A Shoshoni charter school has also been proposed for Fort Hall, with a decision expected in September 2012.
- Tohono O'odham – In 2000 there were estimated to be approximately 9,750 speakers in the United States and Mexico combined, although there may be more due to under-reporting. It is the 10th most-spoken indigenous language in the United States, the 3rd most-spoken indigenous language in Arizona after Apache and Navajo. It is the 3rd most-spoken language in Pinal County and the 4th most-spoken language in Pima County. Approximately 8% of O'odham speakers in the US speak English "not well" or "not at all", according to results of the 2000 Census. Approximately 13% of O'odham speakers in the US were between the ages of 5 and 17, and among the younger O'odham speakers, approximately 4% were reported as speaking English "not well" or "not at all".
- Yurok † – Thanks to one of the most successful language revitalization efforts in California history, the Yurok language is now taught in several Northern Californian schools.
- Zuni – Unlike most indigenous languages in the US, Zuni is still spoken by a significant number of children and, thus, is comparatively less threatened with language endangerment. Edmund Ladd reported in 1994 that Zuni is still the main language of communication in the pueblo and is used in the home (Newman 1996).
