= Ho Dah-an =

Taiwanese linguist (born 1948)

- 何大安
- Born: 22 September 1948 (age 77)
- Education: National Taiwan University (BA, MA, PhD)
- Occupation: linguist
- Known for: Institute of Linguistics
- Awards: member of Academia Sinica

Ho Dah-an (Chinese: 何大安; born 22 September 1948) is a Taiwanese linguist.

== Education ==
Ho earned a Bachelor of Arts degree in 1970, followed by a Master of Arts in 1973 and a Ph.D. in Chinese Literature in 1981 from National Taiwan University.

== Career ==
Ho was a research fellow in Academia Sinica's Institute of History and Philology from 1981 to 1997 and switched affiliations to the preparatory office of the Institute of Linguistics in 1997. Ho served as director of the preparatory office from 2000 to 2004, when the organization formally became the Institute of Linguistics. He remained affiliated with the Institute of Linguistics through 2008 as a research fellow and was also director of the fully fledged institute from 2006 to 2008.

== Awards and honors ==
Ho was elected a member of Academia Sinica in 2010.
