= Jeroen Wiedenhof =

Jeroen Maarten Wiedenhof (born 1959 in 's-Hertogenbosch) is a senior lecturer at the Department of Chinese Studies at the University of Leiden, and an expert on Chinese linguistics, particularly Mandarin Chinese. He is a member of the Leiden school of linguistic theory.
