= George van Driem =

Dutch linguist (born 1957)

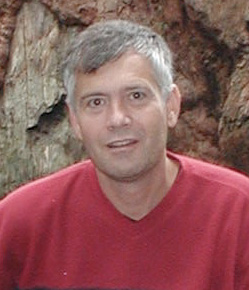
- Van Driem, c. 2006
- Born: 19 March 1957 (age 69); Netherlands
- Occupation: Linguist

Academic background
- Education: Leiden University
- Thesis: A Grammar of Limbu (1987)

Academic work
- Institutions: University of Bern
- Main interests: Trans-Himalayan languages; human evolutionary genetics
- Notable ideas: Father tongue hypothesis; East Asian languages; fallen leaves model of Sino-Tibetan phylogenetics

George L. "Sjors" van Driem (born 19 March 1957) is a Dutch professor emeritus of linguistics at the University of Bern. He studied East Asian languages and is known for the father tongue hypothesis.

== Education ==
- Leiden University, 1983–1987 (PhD, A Grammar of Limbu)
- Leiden University, 1981–1983 (MA Slavic, BA English, MA General Linguistics)
- Leiden University, 1979–1981 (BA Slavic)
- University of Virginia at Charlottesville, 1975–1979 (BA Biology)
- Katholieke Universiteit Nijmegen, 1978–1979
- Watling Island Marine Biological Station on San Salvador Island in the Bahamas, 1977
- Duke University at Durham, North Carolina, 1976

== Research ==
George van Driem has conducted field research in the Himalayas since 1983. He was commissioned by the Royal Government of Bhutan to codify a grammar of Dzongkha, the national language, design a phonological romanisation for the language known as Roman Dzongkha, and complete a survey of the language communities of the kingdom. He and native Dzongkha speaker Karma Tshering co-authored the authoritative textbook on Dzongkha. Van Driem wrote grammars of Limbu and Dumi, Kiranti languages spoken in eastern Nepal, and the Bumthang language of central Bhutan. He authored Languages of the Himalayas, a two-volume ethnolinguistic handbook of the greater Himalayan region. Under a programme named Languages and Genes of the Greater Himalayan Region, conducted in collaboration with the Government of Nepal and the Royal Government of Bhutan, he collected DNA from many indigenous peoples of the Himalayas.

In Bern, Van Driem currently runs the research programme Strategische Zielsetzungen im Subkontinent (Strategic Objectives in the Subcontinent), which aims to analyse and describe endangered and poorly documented languages in South Asia. This programme of research is effectively a diversification of the Himalayan Languages Project, which he directed at Leiden University, where he held the chair of Descriptive Linguistics until 2009. He and his research team have documented over a dozen endangered languages of the greater Himalayan region, producing analytical grammars and lexica and recording morphologically analysed native texts.

His interdisciplinary research in collaboration with geneticists has led to advances in the reconstruction of Asian ethnolinguistic prehistory. Based on linguistic palaeontology, ethnolinguistic phylogeography, rice genetics and the Holocene distribution of faunal species, he identified the ancient Hmong–Mien and Austroasiatics as the first domesticators of Asian rice and published a theory on the homelands and prehistoric dispersal of the Hmong–Mien, Austroasiatic and Trans-Himalayan linguistic phyla. His historical linguistic work on linguistic phylogeny has replaced the unsupported Sino-Tibetan hypothesis with the older, more agnostic Tibeto-Burman phylogenetic model, for which he proposed the neutral geographical name Trans-Himalayan in 2004. He developed the Darwinian theory of language known as Symbiosism, and he is author of the philosophy of Symbiomism.

== Selected publications ==
- — (1987). A Grammar of Limbu. Mouton De Gruyter. ISBN 3-11-011282-5.
- — (1997). "Sino-Bodic". Bulletin of the School of Oriental and African Studies. 60 (3): 455–488. doi:10.1017/S0041977X0003250X. S2CID 246638512.
- — (2001). Languages of the Himalayas: An Ethnolinguistic Handbook of the Greater Himalayan Region. Brill. ISBN 90-04-12062-9.
- — (2003). "The Language Organism: The Leiden theory of language evolution". In Mírovský, Jiří; Kotěšovcová, Anna; Hajičová, Eva (eds.). Proceedings of the XVIIth International Congress of Linguists, Prague, July 24–29, 2003. Prague: Matematicko-fyzikální fakulty Univerzity Karlovy.
- — (2002). "Tibeto-Burman Phylogeny and Prehistory: Languages, Material Culture and Genes". In Bellwood, Peter; Renfrew, Colin (eds.). Examining the farming/language dispersal hypothesis. McDonald Institute for Archaeological Research, University of Cambridge. pp. 233–249. ISBN 1-902937-20-1.
- — (2004). "Language as organism: A brief introduction to the Leiden theory of language evolution". In Lin, Ying-chin; Hsu, Fang-min; Lee, Chun-chih; Jackson, T.S. (eds.). Studies on Sino-Tibetan Languages: Papers in Honor of Professor Hwang-cherng Gong on his Seventieth Birthday. Language and Linguistics Monograph Series W-4. Taipei: Institute of Linguistics, Academia Sinica. pp. 1–9.
- — (2007). "Austroasiatic phylogeny and the Austroasiatic homeland in light of recent population genetic studies" (PDF). Mon-Khmer Studies (37): 1–14. Archived from the original on March 3, 2016.
- — (2007). "The diversity of the Tibeto-Burman language family and the linguistic ancestry of Chinese". Bulletin of Chinese Linguistics. 1 (2): 211–270. doi:10.1163/2405478X-90000023.
- — (2007). A Holistic Approach to the Fine Art of Grammar Writing: The Dallas Manifesto.

== Awards and honours ==
- 1996 Rolex Awards for Enterprise for setting up the Himalayan Languages Project
- 1998 Elected Honorary Member of the Kirat Yakthung Chumlung at Kathmandu

== See also ==
- Mahakiranti languages
- Karasuk languages
