= Vayu language =

Sino-Tibetan language

Vayu
- Hayu
- वायु, हायु
- Native to: Nepal
- Region: Janakpur Zone
- Native speakers: 1,500 (2011 census)
- Language family: Sino-Tibetan: Tibeto-Burman; Mahakiranti (?); Kiranti; Western; Northwestern; Vayu
- Writing system: Devanagari

Language codes
- ISO 639-3: vay
- Glottolog: wayu1241
- ELP: Wayu

Vayu (वायु, Wayu pronunciation: [waːjʊ]), also known as Wayu or Hayu (हायु) is a Sino-Tibetan language spoken in Nepal by about 1,520 people in Bagmati Province. Dialects include Pali Gau (पालि गाउ), Mudajor, Sukajor, Ramechhap, Sindhuli, and Marin Khola. The Vayu language features SOV ordering. There are strong Nepali influences in its phonology, lexicon, and grammar. It uses the Devanagari script as its writing system. There are no known monolingual speakers of the language, as its speaking population also uses Nepali. Despite a lack of monolingual children, use of Vayu has survived into the 21st century.

== Geographical distribution ==
Hayu is spoken in the following locations of Nepal.

- Ramechhap District, Bagmati Province: Mudajor and Sukajor villages
- Sindhuli District: Manedihi village

Hayu is spoken in the Sunkoshi valley, southwards across the Mahabharat range. Ethnic Hayu live on the hills on both sides of the Sun Kosi River but the language is only spoken in the villages listed.

== Phonology ==
Vowels
	Front	Back
Close	i	u
Near-close	ɪ	ʊ
Open-mid	ɛ	ɔ
Open	a	

Consonants
		bilabial	dental	alveolar	palatal	velar	glottal
nasal		m	n			ŋ	
plosive	plain	p	t	ts	c [tɕ]	k	
plosive	voiced	b	d	dz	ɟ [dʑ]	g	
plosive	aspirated	pʰ	tʰ	tsʰ		kʰ	
fricative				s	x		h
tap				ɾ			
lateral	voiceless		ɬ				
lateral	voiced		l				
semivowel		w			j		

== Grammar ==
a-mʊ kɔ lɔm-nɔŋ kɔ nakpu xʷaptsɔ {dum –} kɛm-hɛ kɔlu xʷaptsɔ {nɔ […]} dzəmmə kɔ tsʰukpu dŭmɛ
3S-GEN TOP road-on TOP two:HUM spouse become:23S house-in one spouse be:23S all TOP three:HUM become:3P
‘Now he had two wives on the road – he had one at home – altogether they were three.’

== Bibliography ==
- Boyd Michailovsky (2003) "Hayu". In Graham Thurgood & Randy LaPolla (eds.), The Sino-Tibetan Languages, 518–532. London & New York: Routledge.
- George van Driem (2001) Languages of the Himalayas: An Ethnolinguistic Handbook of the Greater Himalayan Region. Brill.
- Rai, Tara Mani (2017). A Sociolinguistic survey of Hayu: A Tibeto-Burman Language. Central Department of Linugistcs, TU. https://portal.tu.edu.np/downloads/Hayu_2023_09_30_11_19_00.pdf
