= Jerung language =

Kiranti language of Nepal

Jerung
- Native to: Nepal
- Region: Janakpur Zone, Sagarmatha Zone
- Ethnicity: kirati Jerung
- Native speakers: 1,800 (2011 census)
- Language family: Sino-Tibetan: Tibeto-Burman; Kiranti; Western; Chaurasiya; Jerung

Language codes
- ISO 639-3: jee
- Glottolog: jeru1240
- ELP: Jerung

Jerung or Jero is a moribund Kiranti language spoken in Nepal by around 1,000 to 2,000 people in the Okhaldhunga and Sindhuli Districts. It is very closely related to Wambule, and speakers of the two can largely understand each other, so much so that the two may be considered dialects of a single language.

== Name ==
The native language consultants whom Opgenort (2005) consulted, preferred the term ‘Jero’ to designate the language. The term ‘Jerung’, by contrast, is a toponym used in the names of several villages within the language area as well as the name of a village in the Wambule-speaking area. The Jerung language is mutually intelligible with Wambule. Opgenort refers to the language composed of Jero and Wambule as "Chaurasia", an anglicization of the Nepali term Chaurasiya, referring to the 'eighty-four' counties comprising the Jero and Wambule language areas.

== Geographical distribution ==
Jerung is spoken by 1,000 to 2,000 people living in Okhalḍhuṅgā (ओखलढुङ्गा) and Sindhulī (सिनधुली) districts of eastern Nepal. The 2001 Nepal census only listed 271 speakers of Jero.

Jerung is spoken in the following locations of Nepal (Ethnologue).

- Sindhuli District, Janakpur Zone: Bahadur (बहादुर) khola west bank villages, Sunkosi (सुनकोशी) River south to Mohantar (मोहनटार) village (Southern dialect)
- Okhaldhunga District, Sagarmatha Zone: Maulang Khola river area, north of the Sunkosi River (Northern dialect)

== Dialects ==
Gerd Hanßon (1991) claims that there are three to four dialects of Jerung: Madhavpur, Balkhu-Sisneri, and Ratnawati (Sindhuli). However, according to Opgenort's (2005) consultants, there are only two major dialects: a northern dialect, which is spoken in Okhaldhunga District, and a southern dialect, which is spoken in Sindhuli District.

== Phonology ==
Jerung consonants
		Bilabial	Alveolar	Retroflex	Palatal	Velar/Glottal
Plosive	Voiceless	/p/	/t/	/ʈ/	/c/	/k/, /ʔ/
Plosive	Aspirated	/p^{h}/	/t^{h}/	/ʈ^{h}/	/c^{h}/	/k^{h}/
Plosive	Voiced	/b/	/d/	/ɖ/	/ɟ/	/g/
Plosive	Breathy	/bʱ/	/dʱ/	/ɖʱ/	/ɟʱ/	/gʱ/
Nasal		/m/	/n/			/ŋ/
Fricative			/s/			/h/
Trill			/r/			
Lateral			/l/			/^{ʔ}l/
Approximant		/w/	/y/			

Breathy voiced consonants, /c^{h}/, and retroflex consonants are most commonly found in Nepali loanwords; use of retroflex consonants in native Jero words is largely determined by "personal style or preference". Only the glottal stop cannot occur at the start of a word. The glottalized lateral /^{ʔ}l/ is found in literary Jero, as well as some dialects of Wambule.

Jerung vowels
	Front	Central	Back
Close	/i/ /i:/		/u/ /u:/
Close-mid	/e/		/o/
Open-mid	/ɛ/		/ɔ/ /ʌ/
Open		/a/ /a:/	
