= Wambule language =

Kiranti language of Nepal

Coordinates: 27.17708°N 86.43219°E

Wambule
- Chourase
- वाम्बुले
- Region: Nepal
- Native speakers: 14,000 (2011 census)
- Language family: Sino-Tibetan: Tibeto-Burman; Mahakiranti (?); Kiranti; Western; Chaurasiya; Wambule

Language codes
- ISO 639-3: wme
- Glottolog: wamb1257
- ELP: Wambule

Wambule (/ˈwɑːmbuːleɪ/; Nepali: वाम्बुले, romanized: Vāmbulē) is a Kiranti language spoken by the Wambule Rai, one of the Rai groups belonging to the Kiranti (किरान्ती) ethnolinguistic family of eastern Nepal. Wambule is spoken by more than 5000 people living around the confluence of the Sunkosi (सुनकोसी) and Dudhkosi (दूधकोसी) rivers near Kui-Bhir Hill. The Wambule-speaking area comprises the southernmost part of Okhaldhunga district, the westernmost part of Khotang district, the northernmost part of Udayapur district, and the northeasternmost part of Sindhuli district.

== Names ==
Ethnologue records numerous other names that are used for this language. They include Umbule (उँबुले), Ambule, Awambule (अ्वाम्बुले), Caurasia, Chaurasia, Chaurasya, Chourase, Chourasia, Ombule, Radu Yor./Ayor, Tsaurasya, Umbule, Vambucauras Raduyor/Raduayor, Vambule, Vambule Radu Yor/Ayor, and Vambule Yor/Ayor. The Wambule use several native and Nepali names to designate their language, such as 'Vāmbucaurās Rāḍuyor', 'Caurāsiā', 'Ombule', 'Umbule' and 'Vāmbule'. The language most closely related to Wambule is the western neighbour Jero. It is one of a number of Kiranti languages, a language family also known as the Rai languages.

== Geographical distribution ==
Wambule is spoken in the following villages of Nepal:

- Wamdyal/Awamdyal dialect (in southern Okhaldhunga District, Sagarmatha Zone): Ripdwam, Fokul, Darbu, Simkaku, Balangchokfu, Ghrimdi Muchhipum, Shikhai, Daddyal, Kolpum, Khatridyal, Katualdyal, Tarkom, Rinuwal, Dhypti, Sodo, Khachapu, Kurbwamlung, Hukku, Peku, Kakdhyamphu, Gairigau.
- Hilepane dialect (in southern Okhaldhunga District, Sagarmatha Zone): Pipale, Bhadare, Hilepani, Thakle, Mandhare, Sokma Tar, Dundunma, Jakma, Jerun, Ricuva, and Lambole
- Udayapur dialect (in southern Okhaldhunga District, Sagarmatha Zone): Udayapur, Phedigau, Barasi,
- Jhappali dialect (in western Khotang District, Sagarmatha Zone): Kurleghat, Majhkhani, Byanditar, Rupatar, Kharka, Cuvabot, Jhapa, Lurkhudada, Vaitar, Balui, Thumka, Pakauci, Goviar, Gurdum, Jayaram Gha, Bahuni Dada, Todke, Limlun, Damli, Vetagau, and Temtuku
- Udaypur dialect (in northern Udayapur District, Sagarmatha Zone, and northeastern Sindhuli District, Janakpur Zone): Lekhani, Ghurmi, Salle, Sorun, Salleni, Pallo Salleni, Sindure, Majhkhani, Bhirpani, Kusumtar, and Jortighat
- Sunsari dialect (in south mid Sunsari and near of morang District, Koshi zone, Chatra, Jhumka, Parkhspur, Ithari, most Wambule people live in Panbari and dharan.
- Morang dialect (in South and North Morang district Laxmimarga, Gacchiya, Belbari, Nalbari, Farsadangi, Kanepokhari, Biratnagr Wambule people.

== Dialects ==
Gaṇeś Rāī (VS 2055: 8-9) claims that four different Wambule dialects can be distinguished:

- The Wamdyal/Awamdyal dialect is spoken in the Mānebhanjyāṅ Village Development Committee of Okhalḍhuṅgā district, in the area situated roughly to the west of the Paṅkhu Kholā to the east of the Rūmdū Kholā, to the north of the Dūdhkosī river and to the south to the village of Ketukebhanjyāṅ. The Wambule capital village of Wamdyal (which is presently known in Nepali as 'Ubu', 'Uṃbu', 'Ũbu' or 'Uvu') is situated at an altitude of about 1730 metres.
- The Udaipure dialect is spoken in Okhalḍhuṅgā district in a small area along the upper course of the Rūmdū Kholā, just east to the bazaar of Mānebhanjyāṅ. Main village is Udaypur.
- The Hilepāne dialect is spoken in two neighbouring districts. Hilepāne proper is situated in Okhalḍhuṅgā district, to the west of the Rūmdū Kholā, to the east of the Bhāḍāre Kholā, to the north of the Sunkosī and Dūdhkosī rivers and to south of the village of Mānebhanjyāṅ. The main village of Hilepānī is situated at an altitude of about 900 metres. A form of Hilepāne that is said to be influenced by Jero is spoken in Udaypur district, in the area situated to the southwest of the Sunkosī river, to the east of the Bahādur Kholā and to the north of the mouth of the Nibuvā Kholā. The village of Salle is situated at an altitude of about 1200 metres.
- The Jhāppālī dialect is spoken in Khoṭāṅ district in the area to the west of the Dõthe Kholā and the village of Dāmlī, to the east of the Sunkosī river, to the north of the Khahare Kholā and to the south of the Dūdhkosī river. The main village of Jhāpā is situated at an altitude of about 1270 metres.

Ethnologue lists the dialects Bonu, Wamdyal, Udaipure, Hilepane, and Jhappali, and notes that they appear to be mutually intelligible.

- The Sunsari dialect spoken, is like khotnag and okhladunga wambule rai types in rapdacho, brankhalcho, vawachacho, etc. wambule people spoken their wambule languages in basically Panbari people.

== History ==
According to Gaṇeś Rāī, the Wambule tribe is named after one of their kings called Vāṅbu, who is also commonly known as Vāṅbāhāṅg 'king Vāṅbā'. His subjects were known as Vāmbule and his domain was called Vāmdyāl or Vām Dyāl (Vām Village). Candra Bahādur Rāī also claims that the tribe is named after Waŋbu, one of the tribe's most important hwaŋpo ‘king’. This king, or rather chief, is said to rule over an area comprising the southern part of the present-day district of Okhalḍhuṅgā some time prior to the unification of Nepal under Pṛthvī Nārāyaṇ Śāh, King of Gorkhā, and his successors.

== Religious groups ==
According to Opgenort, Wambule society can be divided into three religious groups. A distinction is made between the Jagat, the representative of the generally accepted religious beliefs, and the two sects called Santa-Bhes and Hwam. These two sects have more or less abolished the old tradition of paying respect to the deities and spirits, which have been replaced by the most important Hindu gods. However, the influence of Hinduism has also reached the Jagat, who worship Hindu gods besides their native deities and spirits. The Wambule also celebrate the Hindu festivals, which are national happenings throughout Nepal, such as daśaĩ and tihār.
