= List of revived languages =

Language Endangerment Status by UNESCO Atlas of the World's Languages in Danger category

Extinct (EX)
- Extinct (EX): (lists)

Endangered
- Critically Endangered (CR); Severely Endangered (SE); Definitely Endangered (DE); Vulnerable (VU): (list); (list); (list); (list)

Safe
- Safe (NE): no list
- Other categories
- Revived (RE); Constructed (CL): (list); (list)
- Related topics: Atlas of the World's Languages in Danger; Endangered Languages Project; Ethnologue; Unclassified language; List of languages by total number of speakers
- UNESCO Atlas of the World's; Languages in Danger categories

A revived language is a language that at one point had no native speakers, but through revitalization efforts has regained native speakers.

The most frequent reason for extinction is the marginalisation of local languages within a wider dominant nation state, which might at times amount to outright political oppression. This process normally works alongside economic and cultural pressures for greater centralisation and assimilation. Once a language has become marginalised in this way, it is often perceived as being "useless" by its remaining speakers, who associate it with low social status and poverty, and consequently fail to pass it on to the next generation.

== Aboriginal Australian languages ==
A great number of the original more than 250 Aboriginal Australian languages, which include around 800 dialects, have become extinct or nearly extinct since colonization. Since the late 20th century there have been efforts to revive many of these. The national project known as First Languages Australia has as of 2021 supported 39 of these under its Priority Languages Support Project, commissioned by the Federal Government. This project supports other language projects around the country as a funding body. The Mobile Language Team in South Australia lists 46 languages or dialects on its website as of April 2021, including Ngarrindjeri, Kaurna, Kokatha, Lower Arrernte and Pitjantjatjara, to name a few of the many languages on which it is working.

Some of the languages being revived across the country are:

- Barngarla (Parnkalla, Banggarla), the language of the Barngarla people on the Eyre Peninsula, South Australia. It is being revived by Ghil'ad Zuckermann (University of Adelaide) and the Barngarla community, based on 170-year-old documents.
- Kaurna is the language of the Kaurna people of Adelaide and the Adelaide plains in South Australia. It is being revived by the Kaurna Warra Pintyanthi, a committee of Kaurna elders and youth, teachers, linguists and other researchers based at the University of Adelaide.
- Palawa kani is an attempt to revive various Tasmanian dialects in a single combined form. The original Tasmanian languages, which may have numbered a dozen or more, became extinct in 1905 when the last native speaker died. As part of community efforts to retrieve as much of the original Tasmanian culture as possible, efforts are made to (re)construct a language for the Aboriginal Tasmanian community. Due to the scarcity of records, Palawa kani is being constructed as a composite of the estimated 6 to 12 original languages. Theresa Sainty and Jenny Longey were the first two "language workers" to work on the project in 1999.
- Lower Arrernte went extinct around 2011 with the death of Brownie Doolan but currently has an ongoing revival project.

== Ainu ==
The Ainu language of the indigenous Ainu people of northern Japan is currently moribund, but efforts are underway to revive it. A 2006 survey of the Hokkaido Ainu indicated that only 4.6% of Ainu surveyed were able to converse in or "speak a little" Ainu. As of 2001, Ainu was not taught in any elementary or secondary schools in Japan, but was offered at numerous language centres and universities in Hokkaido, as well as at Tokyo's Chiba University.

Despite this, there is an active movement to revitalize the language, mainly in Hokkaido but also elsewhere such as Kanto. Ainu oral literature has been documented both in hopes of safeguarding it for future generations, as well as using it as a teaching tool for language learners. Beginning in 1987, the Ainu Association of Hokkaido, with approximately 500 members, began hosting 14 Ainu language classes, Ainu language instructors training courses and Family Ainu Learning Initiative and have released instructional materials on the language, including a textbook. Also, Yamato linguists teach Ainu and train students to become Ainu instructors in university. In spite of these efforts, as of 2011 the Ainu language was not yet taught as a subject in any secondary school in Japan.

Due to the Ainu Cultural Promotion Act of 1997, Ainu dictionaries transformed and became tools for improving communication and preserving records of the Ainu language in order to revitalize the language and promote the culture. This act had aims to promote, disseminate, and advocate on behalf of Ainu cultural traditions. The main issue with this act however, was that not a single Ainu person was included in the "Expert" meetings prior to the law's passage, and as a result of this there was no mention of language education and how it should be carried out. The focus at this point was on Ainu culture revitalization rather than Ainu language revitalization.

As of 2011, there has been an increasing number of second-language learners, especially in Hokkaido, in large part due to the pioneering efforts of the late Ainu folklorist, activist and former Diet member Shigeru Kayano, himself a native speaker, who first opened an Ainu language school in 1987 funded by Ainu Kyokai. The Ainu Association of Hokkaido is the main supporter of Ainu culture in Hokkaido. Ainu language classes have been conducted in some areas in Japan and small numbers of young people are learning Ainu. Efforts have also been made to produce web-accessible materials for conversational Ainu because most documentation of the Ainu language focused on the recording of folktales. The Ainu language has been in media as well; the first Ainu radio program was called FM Pipaushi, which has run since 2001 along with 15-minute radio Ainu language lessons funded by FRPAC, and newspaper The Ainu Times has been established since 1997. In 2016, a radio course was broadcast by the STVradio Broadcasting to introduce Ainu language. The course put extensive efforts in promoting the language, creating 4 text books in each season throughout the year.

In addition, the Ainu language has been seen in public domains such as the outlet shopping complex's name, Rera, which means 'wind', in the Minami Chitose area and the name Pewre, meaning 'young', at a shopping centre in the Chitose area. There is also a basketball team in Sapporo founded under the name Rera Kamuy Hokkaido, after rera kamuy 'god of the wind' (its current name is Levanga Hokkaido). The well-known Japanese fashion magazine's name Non-no means 'flower' in Ainu.

Another Ainu language revitalization program is Urespa, a university program to educate high-level persons on the language of the Ainu. The effort is a collaborative and cooperative program for individuals wishing to learn about Ainu languages. This includes performances which focus on the Ainu and their language, instead of using the dominant Japanese language.

Another form of Ainu language revitalization is an annual national competition, which is Ainu language-themed. People of many differing demographics are often encouraged to take part in the contest. Since 2017, the popularity of the contest has increased.

On 15 February 2019, Japan approved a bill to recognize the Ainu language for the first time and enacted the law on 19 April 2019.

Outside of Japan, there have also been efforts to revive the Ainu culture and language in other countries, including Australia and Russia.

In 2019, researchers working together from both the Society for Academic Research of Ainu (SARC), representatives from Hokkaido University, and with the assistance of linguists spanning multiple universities and countries assisted in the creation of AI Pirika, an AI created with the goal of assisting with speech recognition and serving as a conversation partner.

On 12 July 2020, the Japanese government opened the National Ainu Museum in Shiraoi, Hokkaido. It forms one of three institutions named Upopoy (which means 'singing in a large group' in the Ainu language) alongside the National Ainu Park and a memorial site on high ground on the east side of Lake Poroto (ポロト湖) where Ainu services are held. Its director, Masahiro Nomoto, says that "One of our main objectives is to preserve and revive the language, as this is one of the most threatened elements of Ainu culture".

Announcements on some bus routes in Hokkaido can since be heard in Ainu, efforts are being undertaken to archive Ainu speech recordings by the Agency for Cultural Affairs, and there is a popular educational YouTube channel which teaches conversational Ainu.

== Cornish ==
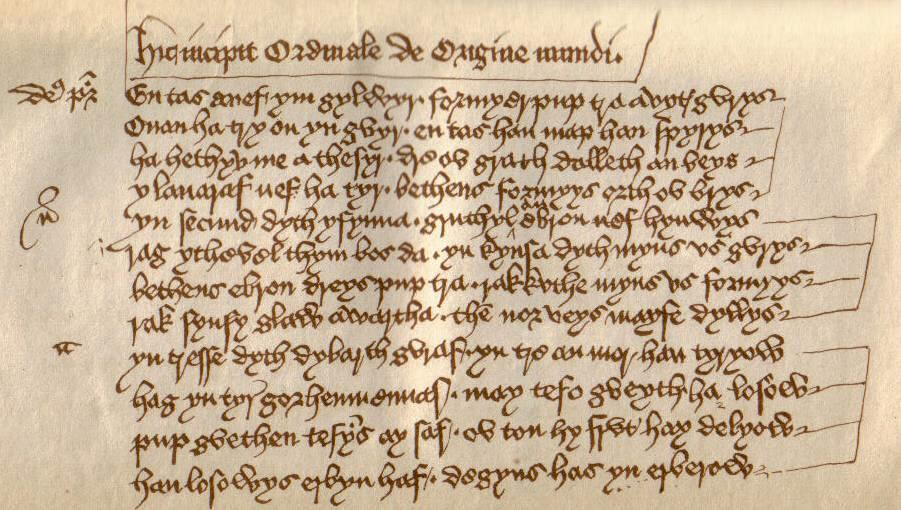
The opening verses of Origo Mundi, the first play of the Ordinalia (the magnum opus of medieval Cornish literature), written by an unknown monk in the late 14th century

Cornish was once spoken in the county of Cornwall until it became extinct as a spoken language in the late 18th century. The language had been in decline since the 14th century and by the time of the death of the last fluent speakers, was only spoken in the western fringes of the county. Dolly Pentreath (d. 1777) is believed to have been the last speaker of the language. Literature from the Medieval and Tudor periods, and fragments, including grammars, from the 17th, 18th and 19th centuries survived, which enabled Cornish to be reconstructed by a small group of Celtic enthusiasts in the 20th century as part of the Celtic Revival. These Cornish language revivalists borrowed heavily from Welsh and Breton in order to aid in the creation of the modern Cornish language. The reconstruction of the language was known for disputes over orthography during the late 20th century, until a Standard Written Form was agreed upon in 2008. The number of Cornish speakers is difficult to estimate, but it is believed that some 500 individuals have a degree of fluency in the language. The language is now taught in some schools in Cornwall. In 2010, UNESCO reclassified the language from "extinct" to "critically endangered".

== Dalmatian ==
Revival of the Dalmatian language began in the 1990s, following Croatia's independence from Yugoslavia, and was initiated by members of Dalmation Action. Interest in the language rose after a series of articles were published by journalist and Dalmatian Action member Srećko Lorger.

Revival has intensified in recent years, as dictionaries and original sources have become widely available online and in print. It is estimated that there are around 50 speakers with some level of fluency, as well as a few hundred people with basic knowledge of the language. There have also been attempts to publish books in the language, including short stories and poetry. The revival is primarily focused on descendants of the language's original speakers, who are known today as Dalmatian Italians, but there is also interest among people unrelated to the original speakers in other parts of the world.

Dalmatian language revival was started and is led mostly by enthusiasts, while academic communities and institutions have shown little interest in its revitalization. As a result, the language has often been overlooked by the media and researchers.

== Hebrew ==
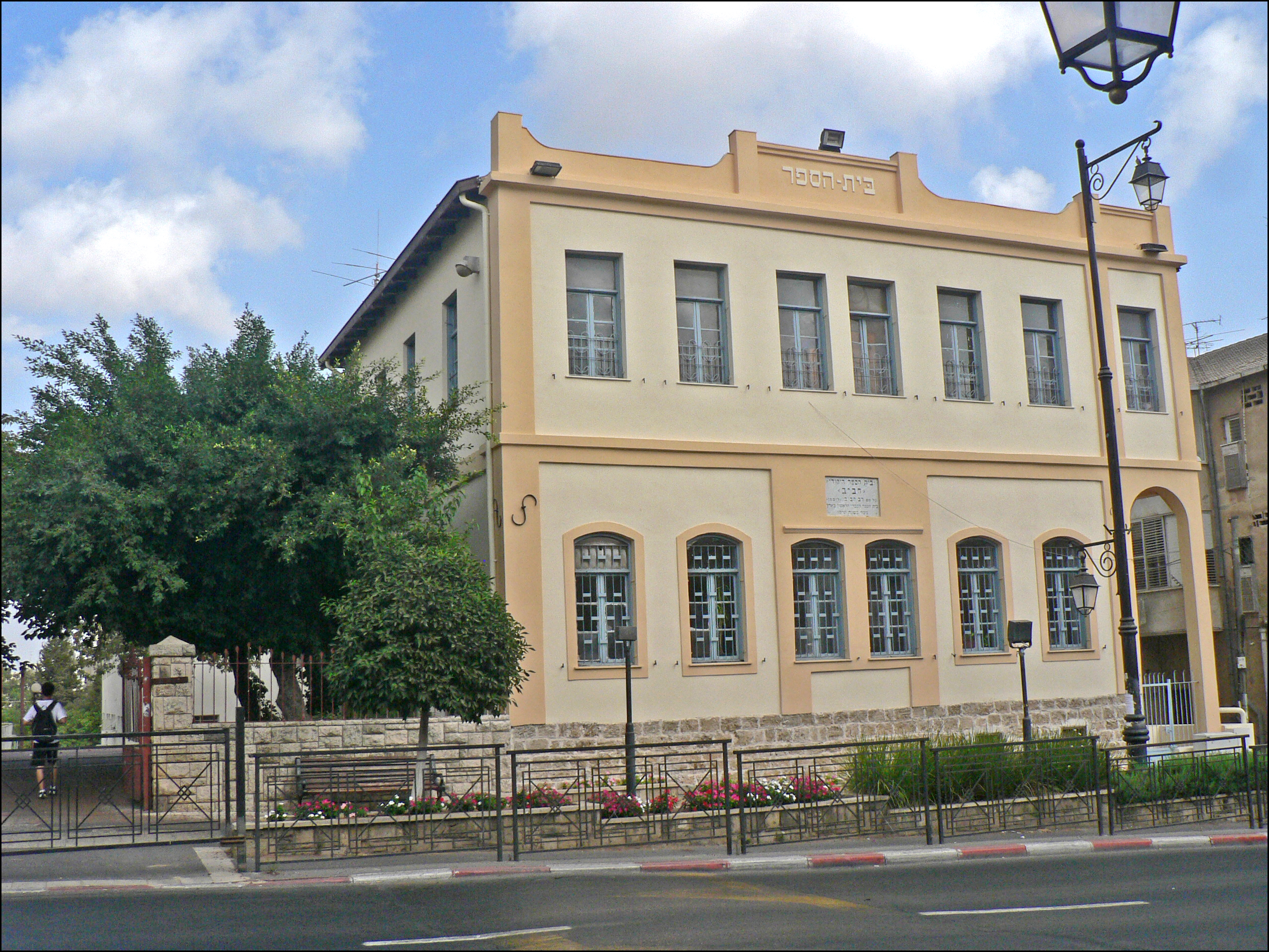
First Hebrew school in Rishon Lezion

Hebrew was revived as a spoken language two millennia after it ceased to be spoken (although it was always used as a written language), and is considered a language revival "success story". Although used in liturgy, and to a limited extent commerce, it was extinct as a language used in everyday life until its revival. Hebrew was considered archaic or too sacred for day-to-day communication, although it was, in fact, used as an international language between Jews who had no other common tongue; several Hebrew-medium newspapers were in circulation around Europe at the beginning of the 19th century, and a number of Zionist conferences were conducted exclusively in Hebrew. Starting in the late 19th century, it was revived as an everyday spoken language as part of the emerging Zionist movement. Eliezer Ben-Yehuda largely spearheaded the revival efforts, and his son Itamar Ben-Avi was raised as the first native Hebrew speaker since Hebrew's extinction as an everyday language. Hebrew is now the primary official language of Israel, and the most commonly spoken language there. It is spoken by over 9,000,000 people today. Most of them live in Israel or are Israeli expatriates, but many in Jewish communities outside Israel have undertaken its study.

== Livonian ==
Livonian is a Finnic language spoken in Latvia. It is one of the three languages (along with Manx and Cornish) listed as revived by the UNESCO Atlas of the World's Languages in Danger.

== Manchu ==
Since the 1980s, there have been increased efforts to revive the Manchu language. Revival movements are linked to the reconstruction of ethnic Manchu identity in the Han-dominated country. The Manchus mainly lead the revival efforts, with support from the PRC state, NGOs and international efforts.

Revivalism began in the post-Mao era when non-Han ethnic expression was allowed. By the 1980s, Manchus had become the second largest minority group in China. People began to reveal their ethnic identities that had been hidden due to 20th century unrests and the fall of the Qing Empire.

Language revival was one method the growing numbers of Manchus used in order to reconstruct their lost ethnic identity. Language represented them and set them apart from other minority groups in the "plurality of ethnic cultures within one united culture". Another reason for revivalism lay in the archives of the Qing Empire–a way to translate and resolve historical conflicts between the Manchus and the state. Lastly, the people wanted to regain their language for the rituals and communication to their ancestors–many shamans do not understand the words they use.

Manchu associations can be found across the country, including Hong Kong, as well as Taiwan, which is under the administration of the Republic of China. Consisting of mostly Manchus and Mongols, they act as the link between the people, their ethnic leaders and the state.

NGOs provide large support through "Manchu classes". Manchu is now taught in certain primary schools as well as in universities. Heilongjiang University Manchu language research center in no.74, Xuefu Road, Harbin, listed Manchu as an academic major. It is taught there as a tool for reading Qing-dynasty archival documents. In 2009 The Wall Street Journal reported that the language is offered (as an elective) in one university, one public middle school, and a few private schools. There are also other Manchu volunteers in many places of China who freely teach Manchu in the desire to rescue the language. Thousands of non-Manchu speakers have learned the language through these measures. Despite the efforts of NGOs, they tend to lack support from high-level government and politics.

The state also runs programs to revive minority cultures and languages. Deng Xiaoping promoted bilingual education. However, many programs are not suited to the ethnic culture or to passing knowledge to the younger generations. If the programs were created via "top-down political processes" the locals tend to look at them with distrust. But if they were formed via specialized governmental organizations, they fare better. According to Katarzyna Golik:

In Mukden, the historical Manchurian capital, there is a Shenyang Manchu Association (沈阳市满族联谊会) which is active in promoting Manchurian culture. The Association publishes books about Manchurian folklore and history and its activities are run independently from the local government. Among the various classes of the Manchurian language and calligraphy some turned out to be a success. Beijing has the biggest and most wealthy Beijing Daxing Regency Manchu Association (北京大兴御苑满族联谊会). (pp100-101)

Other support can be found internationally and on the Internet. Post-Cultural Revolution reform allowed for international studies to be done in China. The dying language and ethnic culture of Manchus gained attention, providing local support. Websites facilitate communication of language classes or articles. Younger generations also spread and promote their unique identity through popular Internet media.

Despite the increased efforts to revive the Manchu language, there are many obstacles standing in the way. Even with increased awareness, many Manchus choose to give up their language, some opting to learn Mongolian instead. Manchu language is still thought of as a foreign language in a Han-dominated Chinese speaking country. Obstacles are also found when gaining recognition from the state. Resistance through censorship prevented the performing of Banjin festivals, a festival in recognition of a new reconstructed Manchu identity, in Beijing.

== Manx ==
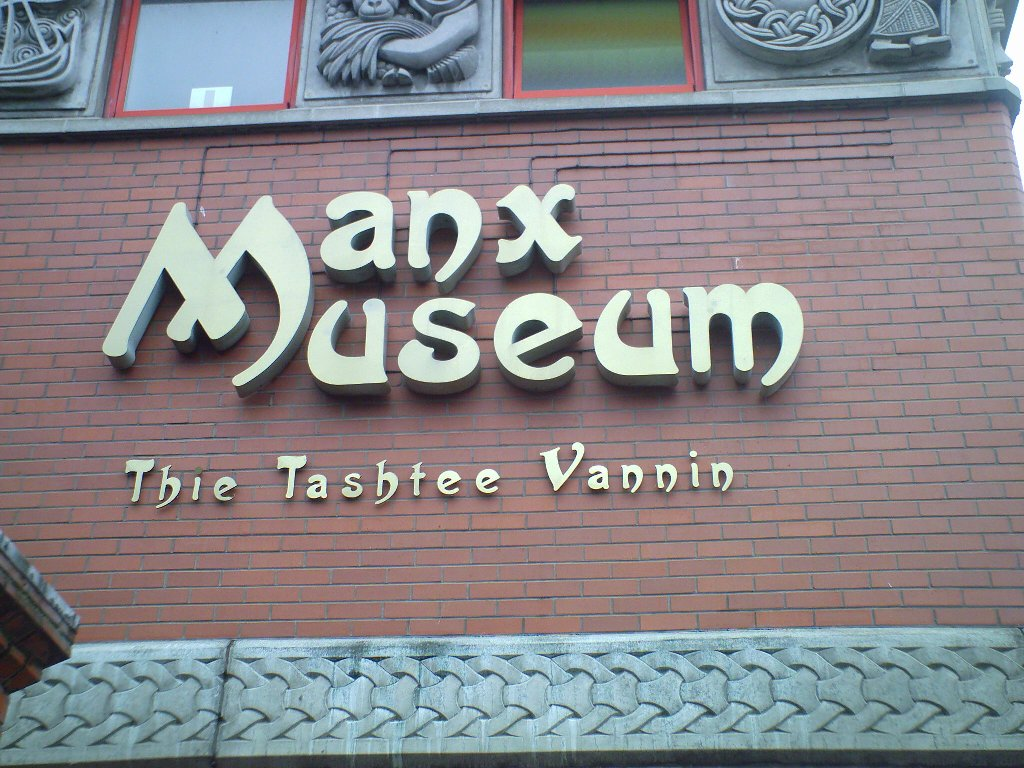
Use of Manx on the national museum; note the smaller font size of the Manx.

Manx is a language spoken in the Isle of Man, which is in the Irish Sea, between Scotland, England, Ireland and Wales. Manx ceased to function as a community language during the first quarter of the 20th century, but was revived by enthusiasts at a time when there were still a number of native speakers alive. Although at one point no native speakers of the language were alive and it may have been officially classified as "dead" in 1975, the revival appears to have gained strength in recent years. There is a regular programme in Manx on Manx Radio. The grammar, spelling and pronunciation reference book on the Manx Gaelic language, Practical Manx by Jennifer Kewley Draskau was published in 2008. As of 2012 there were sixty-nine pupils undergoing their education through the medium of Manx at the Bunscoill Ghaelgagh.

== Native American languages ==
Some languages being revived across the Americas are:

- Mutsun: Mutsun is one of the eight Ohlone languages originally spoken in the San Juan Bautista, California area. The last fluent speaker, Ascencion Solórzano de Cervantes, died in 1930. The contemporary tribe, Amah Mutsun tribal band, is working to revive the language using the notes of linguist John Peabody Harrington. The Mutsun language has a program to teach it to tribal members and a dictionary is being planned. The initial member to galvanize the language revitalization is Quirina Geary. Immersion into the language is planned in books, songs, and games Rumsen and Chochenyo are the other two Costanoan languages being revived along with Mutsun.
- Wampanoag: In the 21st century, Wampanoag became the first Native American language in the United States to be revived, with young children brought up in the language.
- Chochenyo: The Muwekma Ohlone Tribe of California has revitalized the Chochenyo language, which was last spoken in the 1930s. As of 2009, many students were able to carry on conversations in Chochenyo.
- Miami-Illinois/Irenwa: The Myaamia (Miami) Nation of Indiana still practice and use their native heritage to teach young and old so they can keep their traditional language alive. Many Miami members have described the language as "sleeping" rather than "extinct" since it was not irretrievably lost. The revitalization effort is based on the work of linguist David Costa. Based on his extensive studies, he published The Miami-Illinois Language in 1994 as his Ph.D. dissertation and as a book in 2003. The book reconstructs the structure of Miami-Illinois.

The Myaamia Center is a joint venture between the tribe and Miami University. The Center seeks to "deepen Myaamia connections through research, education, and outreach." It is directed by Daryl Baldwin, who taught himself Miami from historic documents and studies held by the Smithsonian's National Anthropological Archives, and has developed educational programs. Baldwin's children were raised as native speakers of Miami. Center staff develop language and culture resources using material that is often from translated missionary documents.

Published language and culture resources include:

- a children's book of Miami language and culture;
- an audio CD set with vocabulary, phrases, conversation, and the Miami origin story and a companion text; and
- a compilation of traditional stories from the Miami and Peoria tribes, recorded in the early 20th century when the language's last native speakers were alive.

A related project at Miami University concerns ethnobotany, which "pairs Miami-language plant names with elders' descriptions of traditional plant-gathering techniques."

== Old Prussian ==
A few linguists and philologists are involved in reviving a reconstructed form of the extinct Old Prussian language from Luther's catechisms, the Elbing Vocabulary, place names, and Prussian loanwords in the Low Prussian dialect of Low German. Several dozen people use the language in Lithuania, Kaliningrad, and Poland, including a few children who are natively bilingual.

The Prusaspirā Society has published its translation of Antoine de Saint-Exupéry's The Little Prince. The book was translated by Piotr Szatkowski (Pīteris Šātkis) and released in 2015. The other efforts of Baltic Prussian societies include the development of online dictionaries, learning apps and games. There also have been several attempts to produce music with lyrics written in the revived Baltic Prussian language, most notably in the Kaliningrad Oblast by Romowe Rikoito, Kellan and Āustras Laīwan, but also in Lithuania by Kūlgrinda in their 2005 album Prūsų Giesmės (Prussian Hymns), and in Latvia by Rasa Ensemble in 1988 and Valdis Muktupāvels in his 2005 oratorio "Pārcēlātājs Pontifex" featuring several parts sung in Prussian.

Important in this revival was Vytautas Mažiulis, who died on 11 April 2009, and his pupil Letas Palmaitis, leader of the experiment and author of the website Prussian Reconstructions. Two late contributors were Prāncis Arellis (Pranciškus Erelis), Lithuania, and Dailūns Russinis (Dailonis Rusiņš), Latvia. After them, Twankstas Glabbis from Kaliningrad oblast and Nērtiks Pamedīns from East-Prussia, now Polish Warmia-Masuria actively joined.

== Polabian ==
Polabian, the extinct West Slavic language of the former East Germany, and spoken as a vernacular until the 18th century, has been revived in the 21st century with at least 5 known L2 speakers. An entire Polabian dictionary has been published by a Polish website.

== Sanskrit ==
Modern Sanskrit is spoken in around four villages in India. The Mattur village in central Karnataka, Shimoga district claims to have native speakers of Sanskrit among its population. Historically the village was given by King Krishnadevaraya of the Vijayanagara Empire to Vedic scholars and their families. People in his kingdom spoke Kannada and Telugu. Jhiri, Madhya Pradesh is another village claimed to have native Sanskrit speakers.

== Soyot ==
The language of the small-numbered Soyots in Buryatia, Russia, one of Siberian Turkic languages, has been reconstructed and a Soyot-Buryat-Russian dictionary was published in 2002. The language is currently taught in some primary schools.

== Yahgan ==
Yahgan, also spelled Yaghan, is a language isolate formerly spoken in Tierra del Fuego, and briefly Keppel Island at a missionary settlement. Its last speaker, Cristina Calderón, died in 2022; multiple attempts have been made by the Chilean government, as well as the family of Calderón to revive the language.

== Yola ==
Yola, a sister language to English and Scots which was spoken in County Wexford, Ireland, became extinct in the mid-19th century, but it has undergone a small attempted revitalization and revival movement. The "Gabble Ing Yola" resource center for Yola materials claims there are approximately 140 speakers of the Yola language today.

== See also ==
- Language death
- Language revitalization
- Language policy
- Minority language
- Regional language
