= Kamalamai =

Kamalamai कमलामाई नगरपालिका
- Municipality
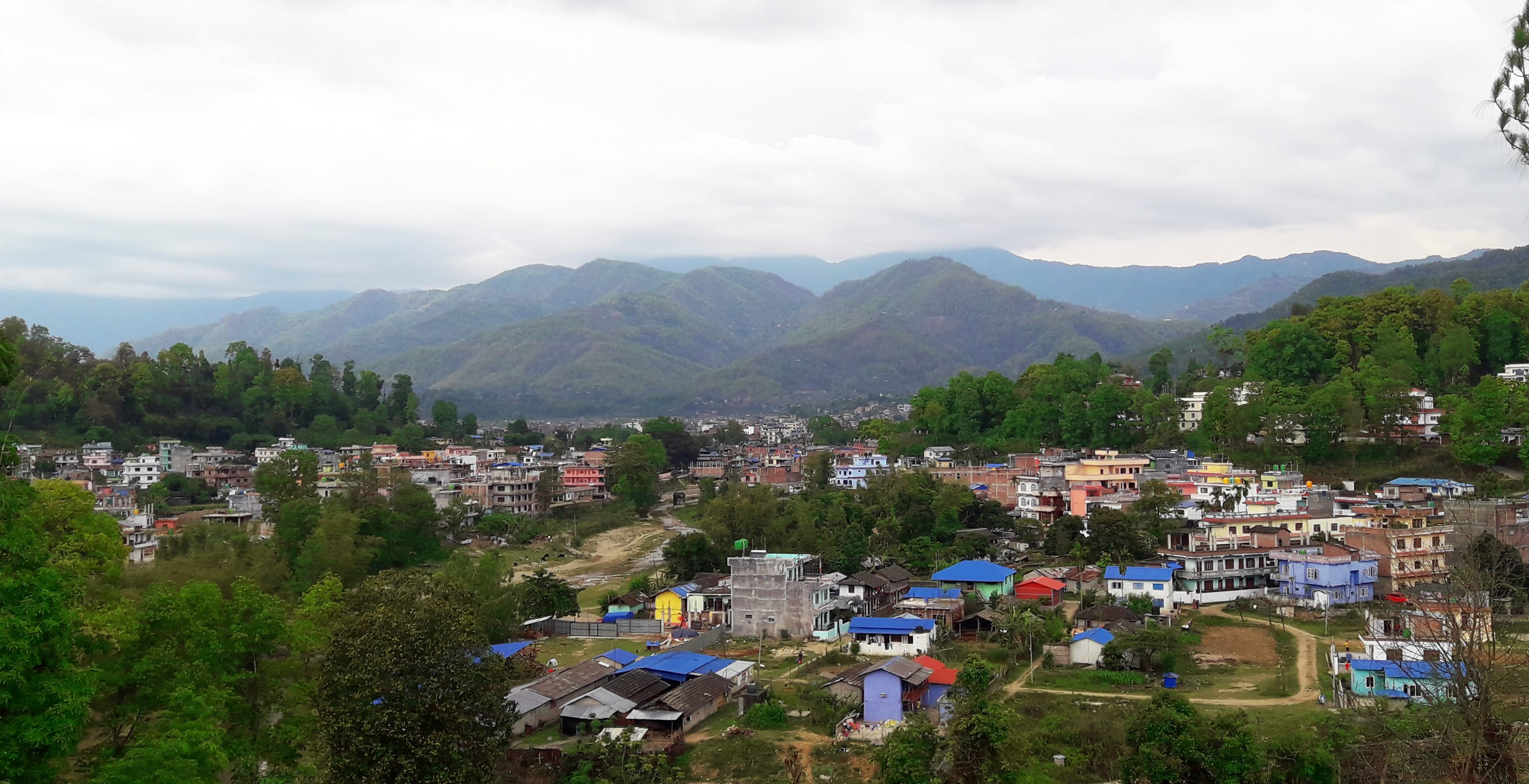
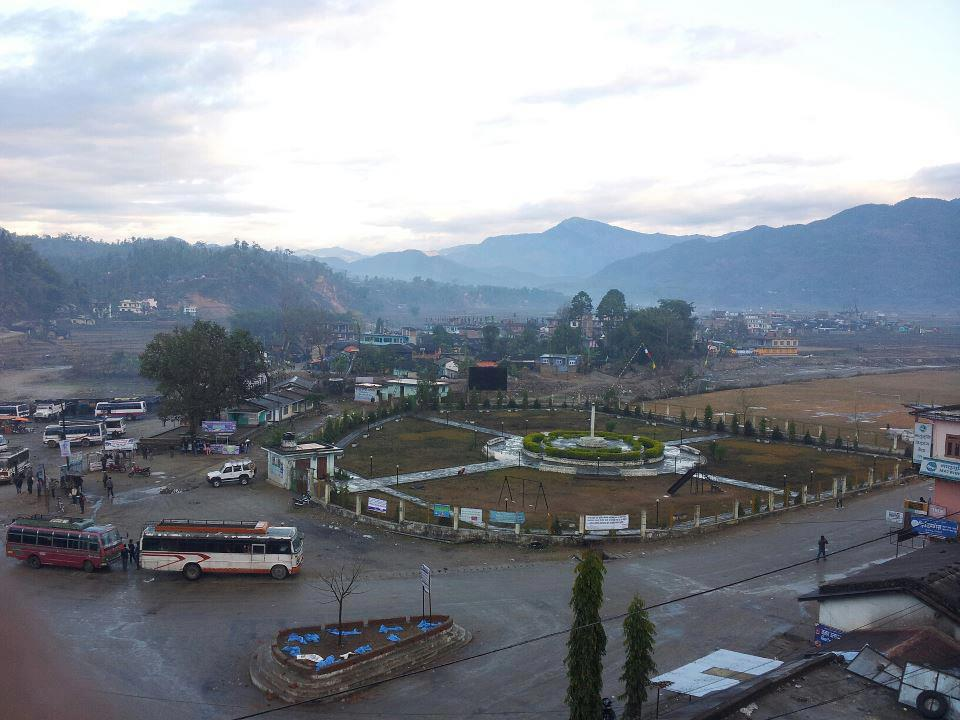
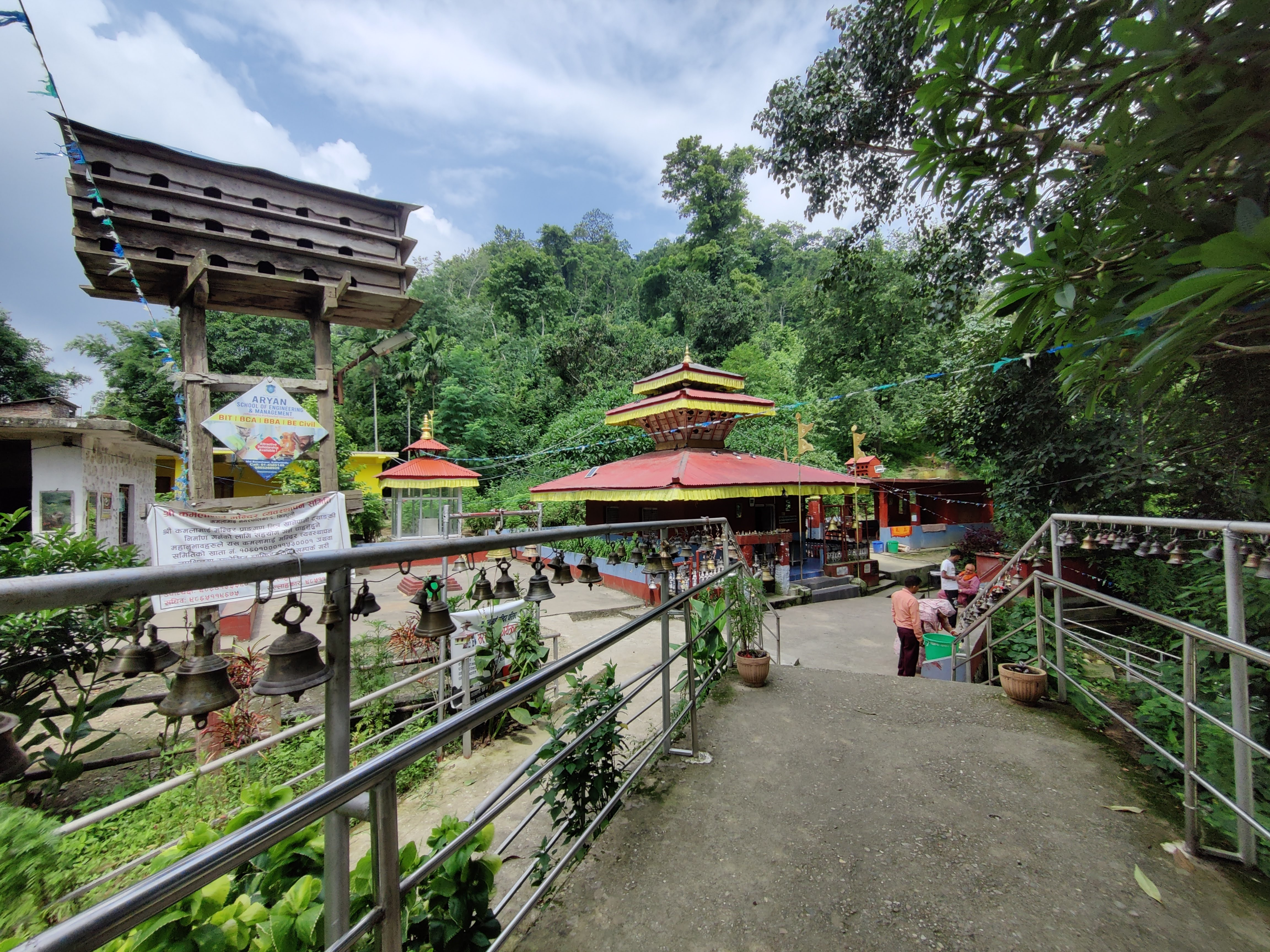
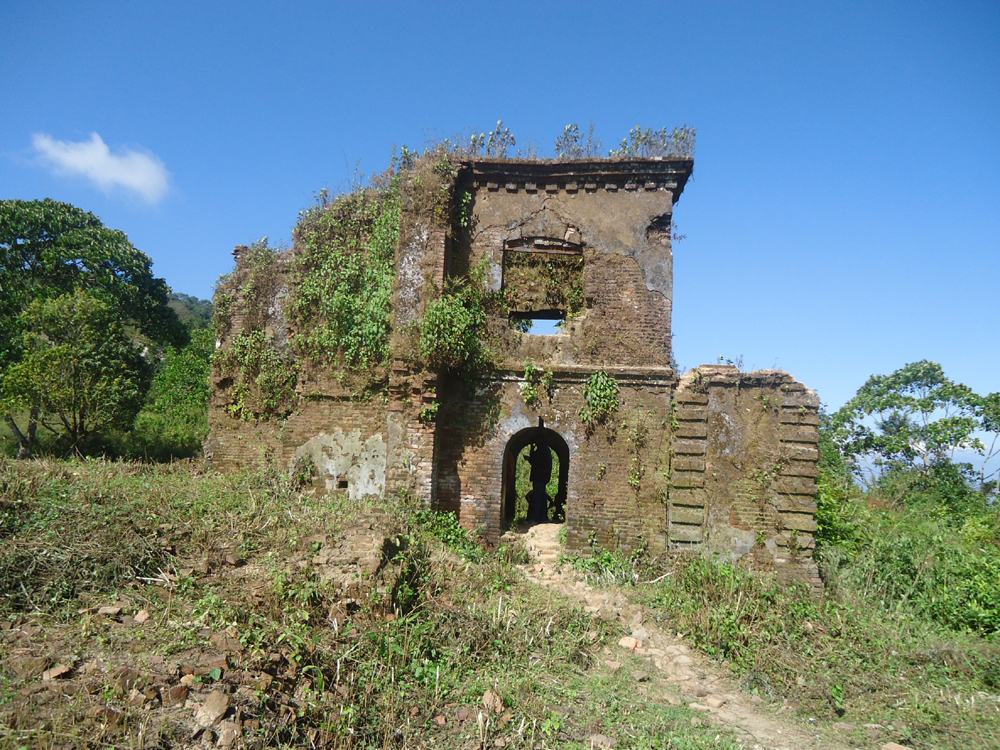
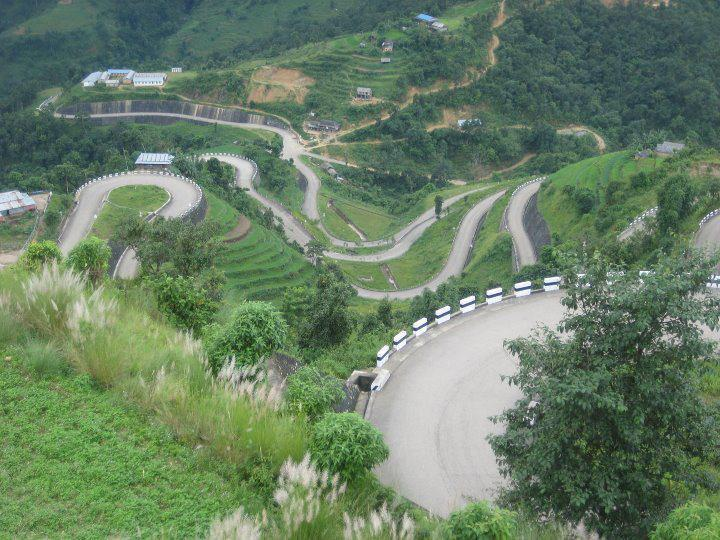
- Clockwise from top: Sindhulimadhi, Madhi Bazar Chowk, Kamalamai Temple, Sindhuli Gadhi, BP Highway

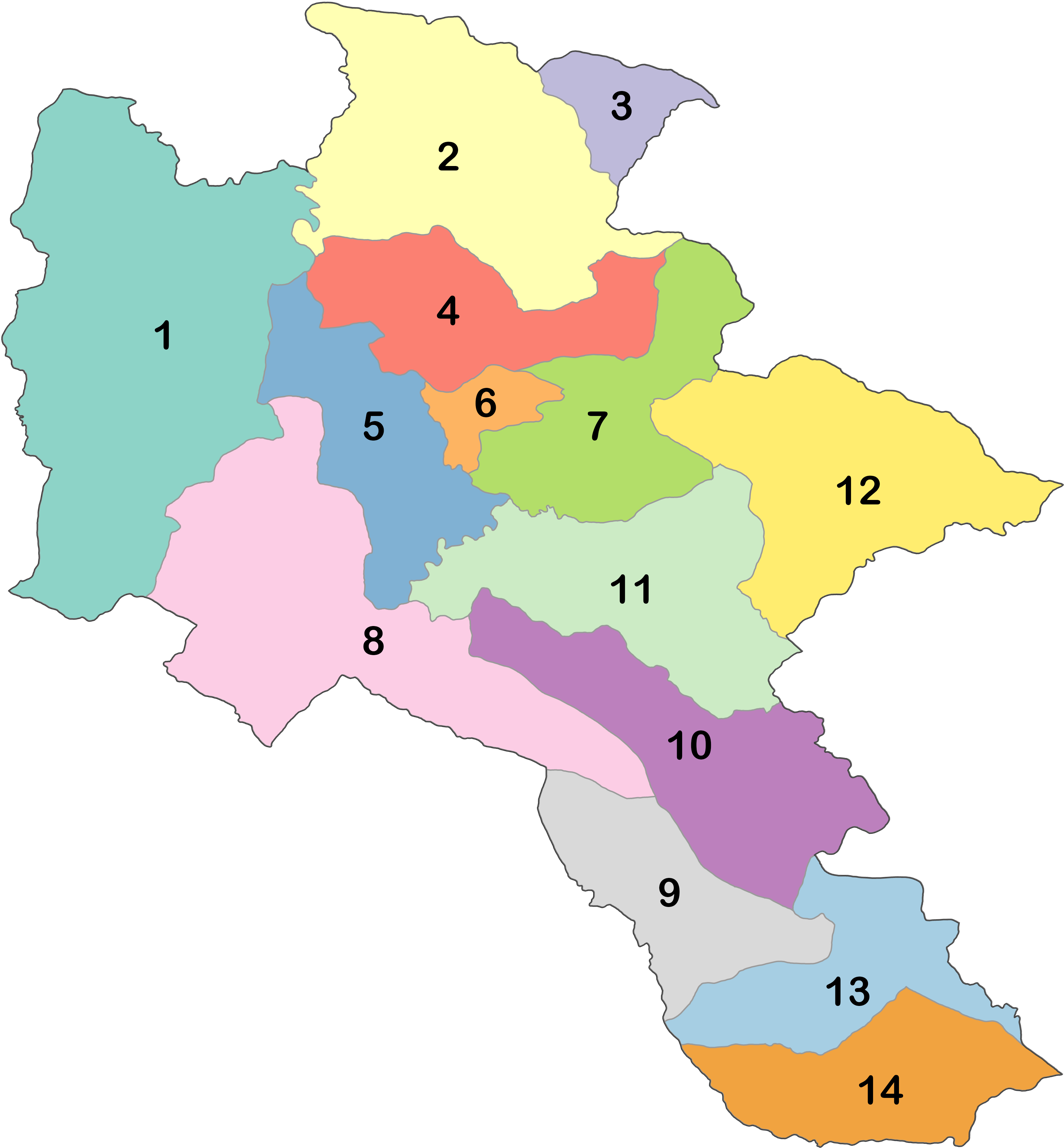
- Wards of Kamalamai

- Location in Bagmati Location in Nepal
- Coordinates: 27.2104°N 85.9124°E
- Country: Nepal
- Province: Bagmati
- District: Sindhuli
- No. of Wards: 14
- Established: 27 March 1997
- Admin H.Q.: Sindhulimadhi

Government
  - Mayor: Upendra Kumar Pokharel (NC)
  - Deputy Mayor: Manju Devkota (CPN UML)

Area
  - Total: 482.57 km^{2} (186.32 sq mi)
  - Rank: 1st in Bagmati Province; 6th in Nepal

Population (2021)
  - Total: 71,016
  - Density: 147.16/km^{2} (381.15/sq mi)
- Time zone: UTC+5:45 (NST)
- Postal code: 45900
- Area code: 047
- Website: www.kamalamaimun.gov.np

Kamalamai (Nepali: कमलामाई) is a municipality in Sindhuli District of Bagmati Province in Nepal. Sindhulimadhi is the administrative center of the municipality and also the headquarter of Sindhuli District. The municipality has a total area of 482.57 km^{2}. In terms of area, it is the largest municipality of Bagmati Province and 6th largest municipality of Nepal. At the time of the 2021 Nepal census, it had a population of 71,016 people in 18,135 households.

The municipality was established on 27 March 1997 (14 Chaitra 2053 B.S) and further expanded on 10 March 2017 (27 Falgun 2073 B.S).

The historic Sindhuli Gadhi fort lies within the municipality on the Mahabharat Hills north of Sindhulimadhi. The iconic BP Highway passes through the municipality.

== Etymology ==
The municipality is named after the Kamalamai Temple, a historic Hindu temple dedicated to the goddess Kamalamai. The temple is located near the confluence of the Kamala and Gwang (Gaumati) rivers, south of Sindhulimadhi.

== Background ==
Kamalamai Municipality was established on 27 March 1997 (14 Chaitra 2053 B.S) by merger of existing Village Development Committees (VDCs) of Siddheshwar (containing Sindhulimadhi) and Bhiman. It had a total area of 207.95 km^{2}. At that time, it was the second largest municipality of Nepal in terms of area.

As part of Nepal’s restructuring of local bodies, the municipality was expanded on 10 March 2017 (27 Falgun 2073 B.S) to include Dandiguranse, Bhadrakali, Jalkanya, Ranichuri and Ranibas VDCs. The total area increased to 482.57 km^{2}.

== Geography ==
=== Topography ===
The municipality’s topography ranges from lower elevation flatlands to rugged hills. It encompasses the areas of Inner Terai, Chure (Sivalik Hills) and some parts of the Mahabharat Hills (Lower Himalayan Range). It includes Sindhuli Valley along with a part of Kamala River Plain, a small part of Marin River Plain and other smaller river plains. Large areas of the municipality are covered with forest.

Major rivers flowing through this municipality include Kamala, Gwang (Gaumati), Gadauli and Marin.

=== Areas ===
Kamalamai consists of various areas and places.

Sindhulimadhi, located in Sindhuli Valley is the center of the municipality. It contains neighbourhoods like Madhi Bazar, Dhura Bazar, Dhungrebas, Ratmata, Madhutar, Majhitar, Panityanki, Laxman Chowk, Rammadi, Milan Chowk, Dhakal Gaun and Gayatar.

Karkare, Bhiman and Ranibas are located on Kamala Plain southeast of Sindhulimadhi. Places like Pipal Bhanjyang, Selfie Danda, Sindhuli Gadhi and Chapauli lie on Mahabharat Hills to the north. The area of Ranichuri containing places like Jarayotar and Tintale lies to the east. Dandiguranse lies on Marin Plain to the west.

== Ward division ==
During the time of incorporation in 1997, Kamalamai Municipality was divided into 18 wards. After the incorporation of 5 more VDCs in 2017, the municipality was reorganized into 14 wards.

Current Ward	Incorporated Municipality / VDC Wards	Area (km^{2})	Population (2021)	Admin. Centre
1	Dandigunrase (1-9)	82.66	4,565	Majhini Damar
2	Bhadrakali (1-9)	50.48	3,790	Nibuwatar
3	Jalkanya (1-9)	9.05	1,359	Chapauli
4	Kamalamai (1,2,5,9)	27.12	8,818	Dhungrebas
5	Kamalamai (4)	26.84	8,292	Madhutar
6	Kamalamai (6)	5.93	12,498	Madhi Bazar
7	Kamalamai (7,8)	28.79	6,828	Majhitar
8	Kamalamai (3,10)	57.84	3,672	Karkare
9	Kamalamai (11,12,14)	24.22	4,728	Bhiman
10	Kamalamai (13,15-18)	37.35	3,397	Dandatol
11	Ranichuri (1-3,5)	38.13	3,800	Jarayotar
12	Ranichuri (4,6-9)	43.34	3,822	Sundanda
13	Ranibas (1-3,8,9)	24.38	2,258	Mathillo Ranibas
14	Ranibas (4-7)	26.44	3,211	Tallo Ranibas

The previous 18 wards and their constituent VDC wards are as follows:

Previous Wards	Incorporated VDC Wards	Population (2011)
1	Siddheshwar 1	611
2	Siddheshwar 2	1,027
3	Siddheshwar 3	1,706
4	Siddheshwar 4	6,045
5	Siddheshwar 5	2,289
6	Siddheshwar 6	9,783
7	Siddheshwar 7	5,255
8	Siddheshwar 8	750
9	Siddheshwar 9	2,243
10	Bhiman 1	1,909
11	Bhiman 2	1,818
12	Bhiman 3	1,714
13	Bhiman 4	688
14	Bhiman 5	714
15	Bhiman 6	720
16	Bhiman 7	733
17	Bhiman 8	595
18	Bhiman 9	813

== Electoral history ==
Election	Mayor	Deputy Mayor
1997	Basudev Shrestha	Ras Bahadur Karki
2017	Khagda Bahadur Khatri (CPN UML)	Manju Devkota (CPN UML)
2022	Upendra Kumar Pokharel (NC)	Manju Devkota (CPN UML)

== Demographics ==
At the time of the 2021 Nepal census, Kamalamai Municipality had a population of 71,016 in 18,135 households. The population was composed of 34,316 males and 36,700 females.

Languages in Kamalamai (2021)
1. Nepali (65.1%)
2. Tamang (20.2%)
3. Magar Dhut (4.59%)
4. Newar (2.94%)
5. Danuwar (2.23%)
6. Maithili (1.95%)
7. Others (2.93%)

In terms of language, 65.13% spoke Nepali, 20.23% Tamang, 4.59% Magar Dhut, 2.94% Newar, 2.23% Danwar, 1.95% Maithili, 0.76% Vayu (Hayu), 0.56% Sunwar, 0.52% Majhi, 0.31% Bhojpuri, 0.16% Bhujel, 0.13% Rai and 0.49% other languages.

Broad ethnic groups in Kamalamai (2021)
1. Hill Janajati (52.8%)
2. Khas (42.1%)
3. Terai Adivasi (2.54%)
4. Madheshi (2.08%)
5. Others (0.46%)

In terms of ethnicity/caste, 22.78% were Tamang, 19.78% Chhetri, 11.44% Magar, 9.68% Newar, 8.80% Hill Brahmin, 5.20% Biswakarma, 3.97% Mijar, 3.39% Majhi, 3.30% Pariyar, 2.37% Danuwar, 2.16% Gharti/Bhujel, 1.41% Hayu, 1.14% Sunuwar, 0.64% Thakuri, 0.44% Sanyasi/Dasnami, 0.39% Terai Brahmin, 0.30% Rai, 0.24% Kalwar, 0.20% Sonar, 0.18% Sundi, 0.17% Gurung, 0.16% Yadav, 0.15% Hajam/Thakur, 0.15% Tharu, 0.15% Muslim, 0.14% Teli, 0.14 Thami, 0.12% Kamar, 0.10% Koiri/Kushwaha and 1.09% others.

Religion in Kamalamai (2021)
Religion	Percent
Hinduism	74.79%
Buddhism	21.39%
Christianity	2.61%
Others	1.21%

In terms of religion, 74.79% were Hindu, 21.39% Buddhist, 2.61% Christian, 0.71% Kirati, 0.28% Prakriti, 0.21% Muslim and 0.01% Bon.

In terms of literacy, 77.83% were literate with male literacy at 85.20% and female at 71.03%.

The historical population of the municipality is given in the following table:

Year	Population	Annual Growth Rate	Density (people per km^{2})	Notes
1991	24,368	—	117	Population of VDCs later incorporated in 1997
2001	32,838	3.03%	158	Population within pre-2017 municipal boundaries
2011	39,413	1.84%	190	Population within pre-2017 municipal boundaries
2011 (recalculated)	64,386	—	133	Population within post-2017 municipal boundaries, including VDCs incorporated in 2017
2021	71,016	0.98%	147	

== Economy ==
Agriculture is the primary economic activity of the municipality. Crops like rice, maize, wheat, potatoes, millet as well as seasonal fruits and vegetables are grown in the municipality. People are also engaged in livestock farming including poultry and dairy production. A significant number of households are dependent on remittances from abroad.

Sindhulimadhi is the main town and the commercial hub of the municipality. As the district headquarters, it serves as a focal point for business activities and services for the entire Sindhuli District. Weekly markets (locally known as Haat) are held at Sindhulimadhi on Wednesdays and Saturdays. Bhiman is another market town of the municipality where weekly market (Haat) is held on Fridays. Apart from trade and commerce, people in the towns are also engaged in service sectors like education, finance, health and public administration.

Tourism is a developing sector in Kamalamai. Natural, cultural and historical attractions including Kamalamai Temple and Sindhuli Gadhi Fort draw visitors to the municipality. In support of tourism, a range of hotels and resorts operate in and around the municipality.

== Public services ==
Health Services: The municipality is served by Sindhuli Hospital, a 100 bed provincial level hospital. Located in Sindhulimadhi, it is the main public health facility in the entire Sindhuli District. There are also health centres and health posts in various parts of the municipality.

Drinking Water: Drinking water supply in parts of the municipality, particularly in Sindhulimadhi and surrounding areas, is managed by the Siddheshwar Drinking Water and Sanitation Consumers Committee. It is a community-based organisation that operates a piped water system sourcing from local springs and reservoirs. This system supplies piped water to several thousand households, with infrastructure including treatment and storage facilities.

Sanitation and Waste Management: Municipal waste management is overseen by Kamalamai’s Public Health and Environment section, which coordinates solid waste collection, street cleaning and environmental sanitation across wards.

== Transportation ==
=== Regional ===
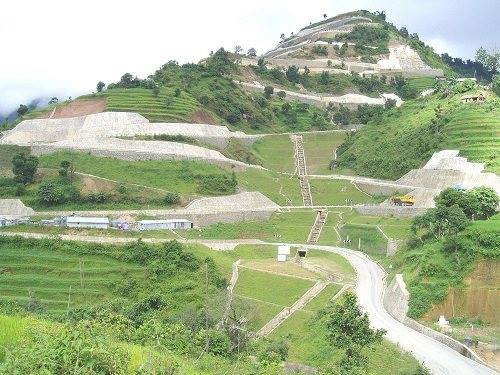
BP Highway

Two national highways, BP Highway and Madan Bhandari (Inner Terai) Highway run through Kamalamai Municipality.

BP Highway connects the municipality to Kathmandu via Dhulikhel and to Terai via Bardibas. It passes through places like Bhiman, Sindhulimadhi and Sindhuli Gadhi. The Sindhulimadhi-Khurkot section of this highway, part of which lies within the municipality, is famous for its scenic route around the Mahabharat Hills, characterized by numerous hairpin turns.

Dharan-Hetauda section of Madan Bhandari (Inner Terai) Highway connects the municipality to Katari, Udayapur to the east and to Hetauda to the west. It passes through Ranibas and merges with BP Highway at Bhiman. The highway resumes at Sindhulimadhi and runs westwards towards Hetauda.

Long-route vehicles run from Sindhulimadhi to cities like Kathmandu, Janakpur, Biratnagar, Birgunj, Hetauda and Pokhara. Janakpur Airport is the closest major airport to the municipality located about 70 kilometers away from Sindhulimadhi.

=== Local ===
Most of the parts of Kamalamai are accessible by road. Nowadays, auto rickshaws have common mode of transport within municipality.

== Education ==
=== Primary and secondary education ===
Kamalamai municipality provides secondary education up to the Secondary Education Examination (SEE) level. Notable private schools in the Sindhuli District include Janata, Suryodaya, Bhagwati, Siddhasthali, and Swiss. At the higher secondary (+2) level, there are several private colleges that offer commerce programs affiliated with HSEB, while Kamala Higher Secondary School serves science students throughout the Sindhuli valley.

==== Schools ====
- Scholars' Academy Boarding School, Bhiman
- Janata Secondary English Boarding School, Ratmata
- Kamala Academic Boarding School, Bhiman
- Shree Janajagriti Mavi Bidyalaya, Bhiman
- Bhagawati English Secondary School, 2 no. Bazaar
- Shining Moon Academy, Madhutar
- Sindhuli Vidhyashram English Boarding School, Dovantaar
- Sindhuli Pathshalaa, Dhungrebas
- Kamala Higher Secondary School, Dhungrebas
- Gaumati Model Secondary School, Majhitaar
- Shree Jana Jyoti Secondary School
- Barun Devi Secondary School
- Daurali Nimna Secondary School
- Shree Siddhabba Secondary School, Panityanki
- New English Secondary Boarding School, Milan Chowk
- Kalimati Nimna Secondary School
- Suryodaya English Secondary School, Ratmata
- Siddhababa English Boarding High School
- New Siddhasthali English Boarding School
- Swiss Sindhuli Secondary English Medium School
- Shree Navajyoti Deaf Lower Secondary School
- Shree Gyan Jyoti Aadarbhut Bidyalaya, Kauchhe
- Aadhunik English Boarding School, Panityanki

=== Higher education ===
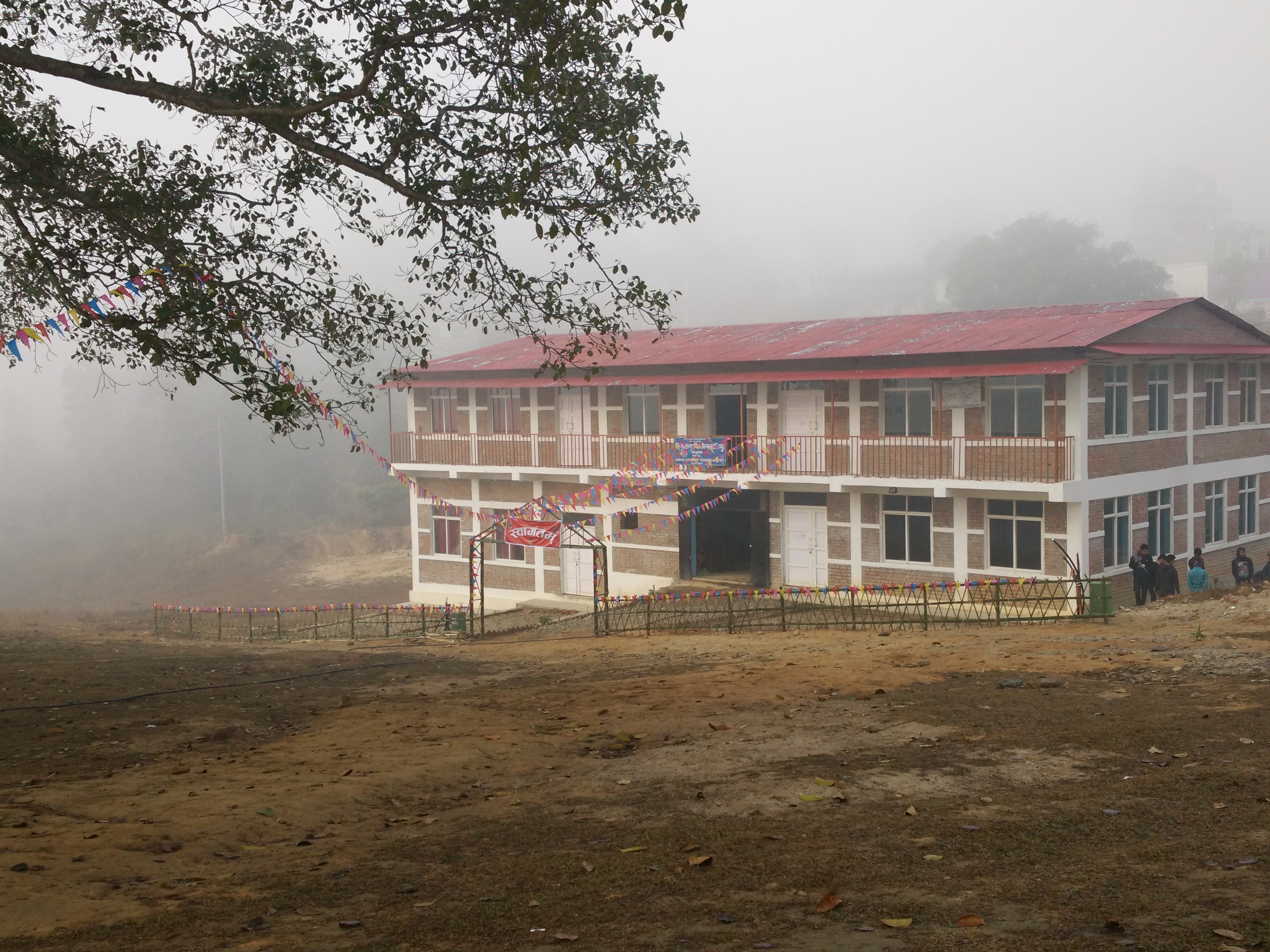
Sindhuli Community Technical Institute

There are many colleges which facilitate higher education. There are a large number of colleges running courses with affiliation to universities of Nepal. Colleges like Sindhuli Multiple Campus fall under this category. Kamala Science Campus enables students to acquire Bachelor of Science courses (BSc.). There are also colleges for technical education were subjects affiliated with CTEVT are taught.

==== Colleges ====
- Shree Janajagriti Ma Vi Bidyalaya, Bhiman
- Gaumati Model Secondary School
- Kamala Science Campus
- Siddha Jyoti Shiksha Campus
- Sindhuli Multiple College
- Sindhuli Community Technical Institute, Sindhuli
- Shree Prabhat Ma Vi, Ranibas

== Communication and Media ==
Kamalamai Municipality has good mobile network coverage with 4G service, mainly provided by Nepal Telecom (NTC) and Ncell. High-speed optical fiber internet is also available, offered by various internet service providers.

To promote local culture, Kamalamai Municipality has three FM radio stations: Sindhuligadhi FM - 92 MHz, Radio Siddhababa - 98.4 MHz and Radio Sahara - 104.2 MHz.

The KM Club holds various events in colleges of Sindhuli.

== Places of attraction ==
=== Historical sites ===
- Sindhuli Gadhi Fort
- Ranichuri Durbar

=== Temples ===
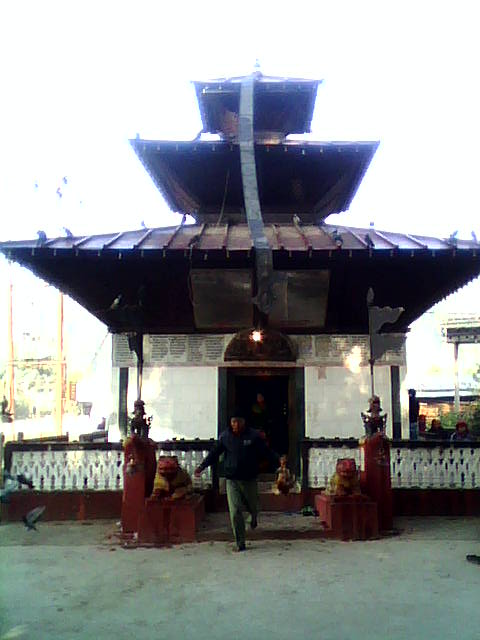
Kalimai Temple

- Kamalamai (कमलामाई)
- Siddhababa (सिद्धबाबा)
- Rameshwar Dham (रामेश्वर धाम)
- Ganesh Than (गणेश थान)
- Maisthaan
- Kalimaithaan
- Rakta Mala
- Sibalaya
- Gayadevi
- Krishna Mandir
- Bakeshwor Mahadev
- Bhimsen Mandir
- Ganesh Mandir
- Bhadrakaali Mandir
