= Kamalamai Temple (Sindhuli) =

Hindu temple in Sindhuli, Nepal

- कमलामाई मन्दिर
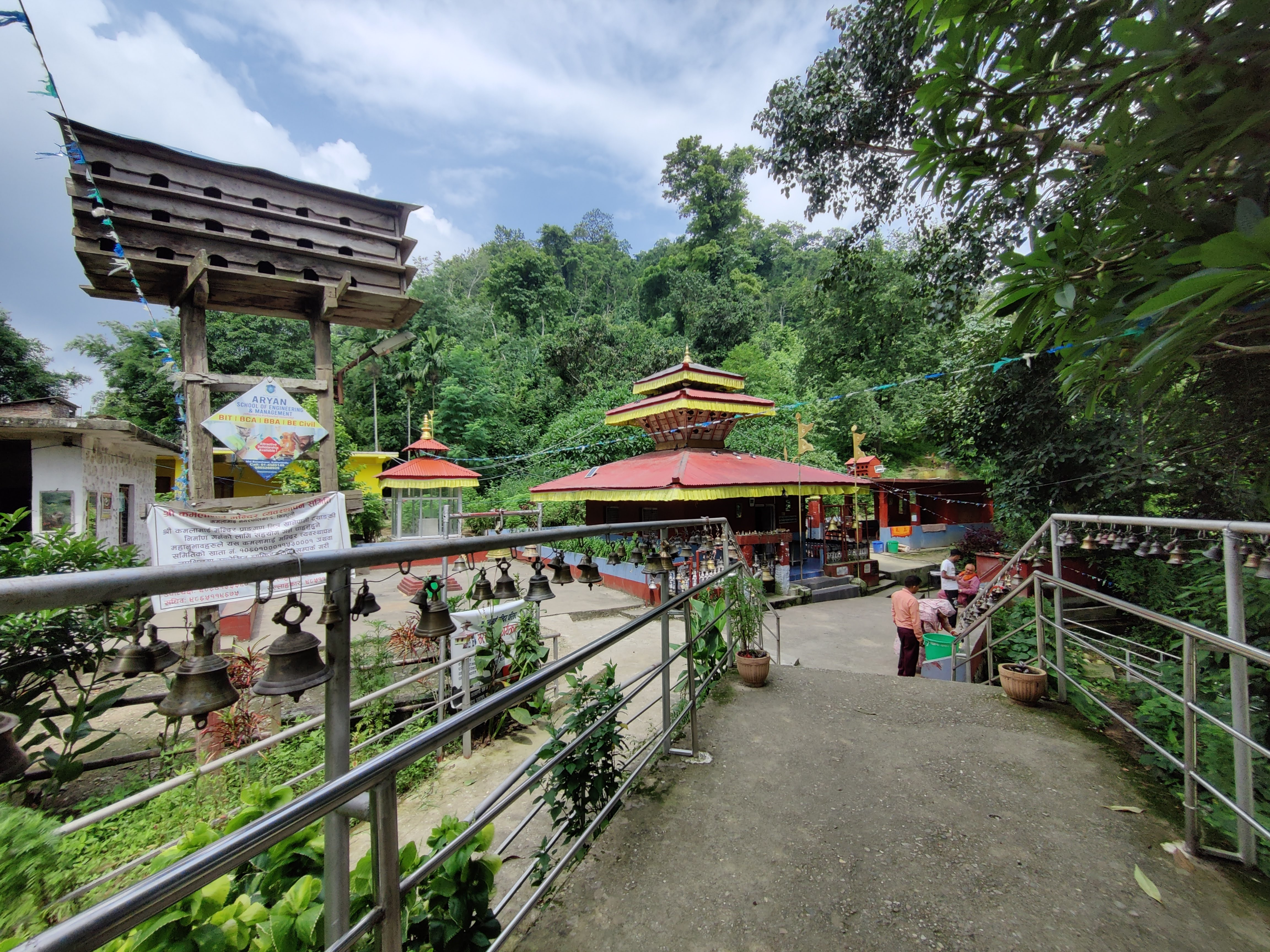
- Kamalamai Temple in 2023

- Kamalamai Temple in Nepal

Religion
- Affiliation: Hinduism
- District: Sindhuli
- Province: Bagmati Province

Location
- Location: Kamalamai Municipality
- Country: Nepal
- Interactive map of Kamalamai Temple
- Coordinates: 27.166103°N 85.900402°E

The Kamalamai Temple (Nepali: कमलामाई मन्दिर) is a historic Hindu temple located in Kamalamai municipality in Sindhuli district, Nepal. It is situated on the bank of the Kamala river (from where the river gets its name) and about 200 m off the BP Highway in Bagmati Province.

The Shah dynasty worshipped in the temple. Annually on Makar Sankranti, a festival is held where devotees present offerings to the goddess with the hope of having their wishes granted. Uniquely, Kamalamai Temple is the sole temple in Nepal where offerings of fish are made as a sacrifice.

In Hindu mythology, Ganga and Kamala are described as divine sisters. During a visit to the Mai River, Kamala accidentally harmed some sesame plants, leading Ganga to suggest that Kamala atone by serving the peasants whose field she had damaged. Ganga left, and Kamala remained. Years later, the peasants, while traveling to Kashi, failed to pass on Kamala's gift of rice seeds to Ganga. Realizing their mistake upon their return, they released Kamala from her servitude as Ganga appeared to confirm that her penance was complete. The temple at this location is unique as sesame seeds are traditionally not offered there, in memory of Kamala's story.

== See also ==
- List of Hindu temples in Nepal
- Ghost Festival (Nepal), festival celebrated in the bank of Kamala River
