= Mangaltar =

Mangaltar may refer to:

- Mangaltar, Kavrepalanchok, Nepal
- Mangaltar, Khotang, Nepal
