= Bhiman =

Municipality in Central, Nepal

Bhiman भिमान बजार
- Town / Former VDC
- Nickname: Bhiman Bazar
- Location of Bhiman in Nepal
- Coordinates: 27°10′N 85°55′E
- Country: Nepal
- Province: Bagmati
- District: Sindhuli
- Municipality: Kamalamai
- Incorporated as Kamalamai Municipality: 1997

Population (Bhiman VDC in 1991)
  - Total: 7,609
  - Ethnicities (Majorities): Brahmin Chettri Newar
  - Ethnicities (Minorities): Magar Gurung Tamang Limbu
- Time zone: GMT +5:45
- Postal Code: 45909 (Sindhuli)
- Area code: 047

Bhiman (Nepali: भिमान) is a town in Kamalamai Municipality and former VDC of Sindhuli District in the Bagmati Province of Nepal. At the time of the 1991 Nepal census it had a population of 7,609 people living in 1,389 individual households.

Bhiman VDC was merged with Siddheshwar VDC in 1997 A.D (2053 B.S) to form Kamalamai Municipality. The town currently falls under ward no. 9 (previous ward no. 11) of Kamalamai Municipality whereas the area encompassed by the former VDC falls under wards 8-10 (previous wards 10-18).

== Geography ==
Bhiman is an important town in Sindhuli District as it is a gateway to the district from terai region of Nepal. It is at a distance of 19 Kilometers from Bardibas. Bhiman is located on B.P. Koirala Highway, and is only 18 Kilometers from district headquarter Sindhulimadhi. Bhiman - Katari road passes through the town. The town of Bhiman lies close to the bank of Kamala River. A small seasonal river Bhiman Khola also flows near the town. Bhiman is located at 27.1025°N 85.9649°E.

== Education ==
Bhiman is an important educational hub in Sindhuli district. Bhiman has a number of schools from primary level to college level. Bhiman has three secondary schools and a primary school, Shri Jana Jagriti Higher Secondary School and campus, Scholar's Academy, Kamala Academic School and Shree Hariyali Primary School is the only primary school. Shri Jana Jagriti Higher Secondary School and campus offers high school level(10+2) and Bachelor level courses on Arts and Commerce disciplines, which is affiliated to Tribhuwan University.Kamala Academic school also offers level(10+2).

== Business ==
Bhiman is a business hub for its surrounding villages. It has one Developmental Bank (Class B); Matribhumi Bikas Bank Limited. In addition, it has three Finance companies, there is building and construction material pasal (Manakamana and shrestha hardware pasal). There is a weekly market, Fridays are the day for weekly markets.

HEALTH: Bhiman has a Sub District Hospital, which has basic health facilities. There is a separate Maternity ward in the hospital. There are few other health clinics managed by Private persons.

SECURITY: Bhiman, in terms of security have one Army Base Camp consisting 70+ armed Arms and one Police Station consisting about 24 police and is considered a safe and secure place to visit.

Related: Clubs like Bhiman Youth Club, Pannesi Youth Club and Srijana Youth Club are the active clubs of Bhiman following the different cultures and traditions taught by ancestors. These clubs organizes the sanitarium programs and organizes different other sports and competition like Football Tournament, Cricket Tournament, Cultural program, and also helps in social awareness.

== Transport ==
Bhiman is well connected to Mahendra Highway, also called East-West Highway and B.P. Koirala Highway also known as Banepa - Bardibas Highway. Bhiman is well connected to major cities in Nepal and there are daily buses to Kathmandu, Pokhara, Biratnagar, Birjung, Janakpurdham. The nearest airport is the domestic airport in Janakpurdham. Bhiman has an Administration office, Forest office, post office and a health post. The major mobile operators in Nepal like Nepal Telecom, Ncell and Smartcell providing both GSM and CDMA services. There is also facility of landline phone.

== Sports ==
Bhiman is well known for sports like football, volleyball, badminton & cricket around the Sindhuli. Active clubs like Bhiman youth club, Rato Guras Yuva Club and others organizes sports event like football league during festive time with participants from many different places.
