= Shantinagar =

Shantinagar may refer to:

- Shantinagar, Mechi, Nepal
- Shantinagar, Rapti, Nepal
- Shantinagar, Dhaka, Bangladesh
- Shantinagar Bus Station, Bangalore
