= Sindhulimadhi =

Sindhulimadhi सिन्धुलीमाढी Sindhuli, Sindhuli Bazar
- Town / District Headquarter
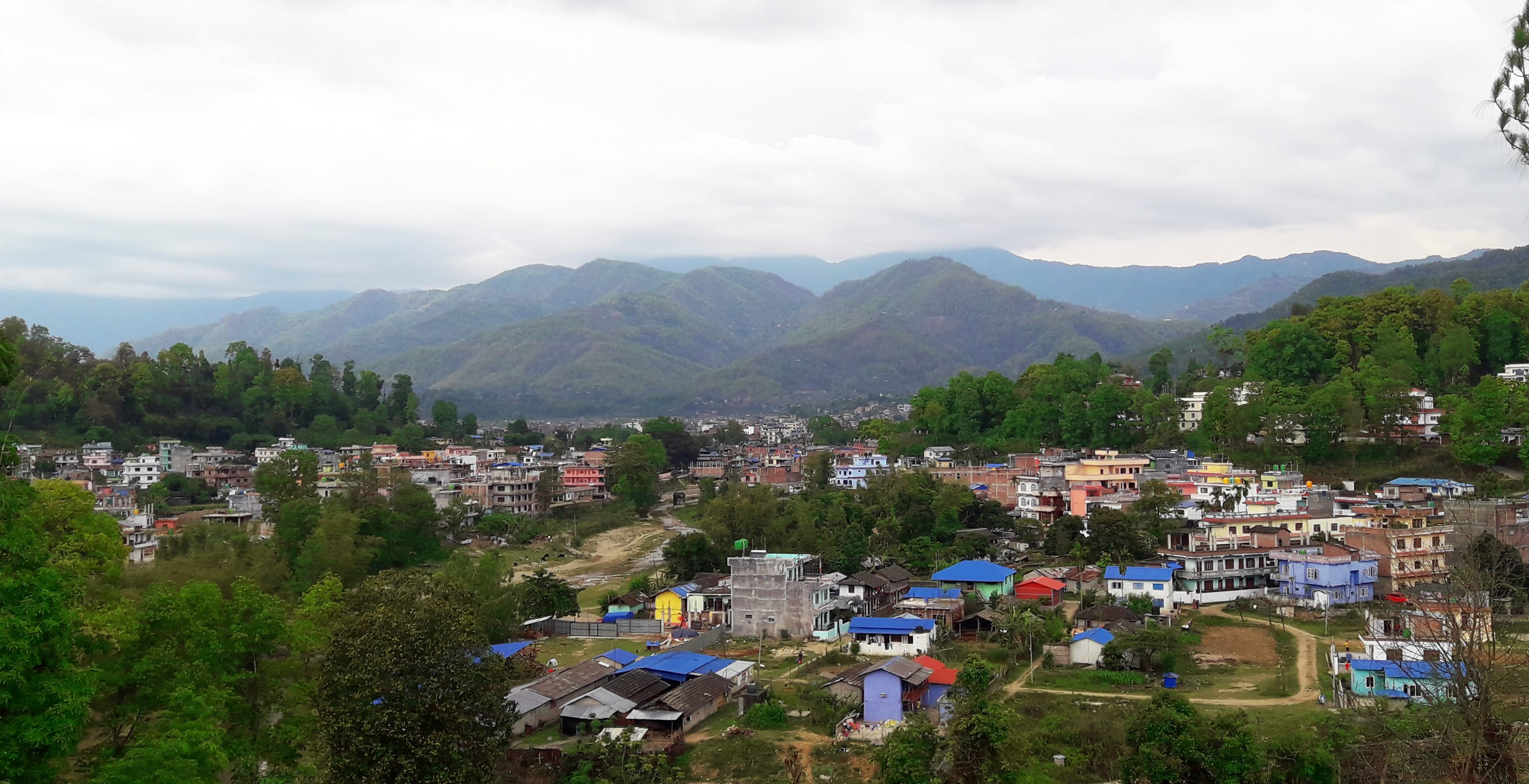

- Location in Bagmati Location in Nepal
- Coordinates: 27.2104°N 85.9124°E
- Country: Nepal
- Province: Bagmati
- District: Sindhuli
- Municipality: Kamalamai
- Wards: 4,5,6 & 7
- Established as District Headquarters: 2 January 1967
- Incorporated into Kamalamai Municipality: 27 March 1997

Area
  - Total: 88.68 km^{2} (34.24 sq mi)
- Elevation: 510 m (1,670 ft)

Population (2021)
  - Total: 36,436
  - Density: 410.9/km^{2} (1,064/sq mi)
- Time zone: UTC+5:45 (NPT)
- Postal Code: 45900
- Area Code: 047

Sindhulimadhi (Nepali: सिन्धुलीमाढी) or Sindhulimadi (Nepali: सिन्धुलीमाडी), commonly known as Sindhuli or Sindhuli Bazar, is the headquarter of Sindhuli District and the administrative center of Kamalamai Municipality in Bagmati Province of Nepal. It has a total area of 88.68 km^{2}. According to 2021 census, the town has a population of 36,436.

It is located in Sindhuli Valley and comprises four wards of Kamalamai Municipality. It is about 150 kilometers away from national capital Kathmandu and 120 kilometers from provincial capital Hetauda.

== Background ==
Sindhulimadhi was designated as the headquarters of Sindhuli District on 2 January 1967 (18 Poush 2023 B.S). Before that, Sindhuli Gadhi was the headquarter of Sindhuli District. The town was the part of Siddheshwar VDC till 1997. It became the part of Kamalamai Municipality on 27 March 1997 (14 Chaitra 2053 B.S), formed by the merger of Siddheshwar and Bhiman VDCs.

== Geography ==
=== Topography ===
Sindhulimadhi lies in Sindhuli Valley which is surrounded by Chure Hills to the south and Mahabharat Hills to the north. The town sits at an elevation of 510 meters above sea level. Gwang (Gaumati) and Gadauli are the two main rivers flowing through the town.

=== Areas ===
Madhi Bazar is the main market area of Sindhulimadhi. It is further divided into three parts: 1 No. Bazar, Gairi Bazar and 2 No. Bazar. Dhura Bazar and Dhungrebas are other market areas within the town.

The residental neighbourhoods include Madhutar, Ratmata, Panityanki, Majhitar, Rammadi, Laxman Chowk, Milan Chowk, Dhakal Gaun and Gayatar.

== Administration ==
Sindhulimadhi comprises four wards (4-7) of Kamalamai Municipality. They are as follows:

Current Ward	Previous Wards	Area (km^{2})	Population (2021)	Admin. Center
4	1,2,5 & 9	27.12	8,818	Dhungrebas
5	4	26.84	8,292	Madhutar
6	6	5.93	12,498	Madhi Bazar
7	7 & 8	28.79	6,828	Majhitar

== Economy ==
As the district headquarters and principal market town, Sindhulimadhi serves as a focal point for business activities and services within the region. Weekly markets (locally known as Haat) are held at Sindhulimadhi on Wednesdays and Saturdays. Apart from trade and commerce, people in the towns are also engaged in service sectors like education, finance, health and public administration.

Tourism is a developing sector in Sindhulimadhi. The town is the gateway to historic Sindhuli Gadhi Fort. In support of tourism, a range of hotels and resorts operate in and around the town.

== Public services ==
As the administrative center of Kamalamai Municipality, Sindhulimadhi hosts most of the municipality’s key public service institutions.

== Transportation ==
Sindhulimadhi lies along the BP Highway, which connects it to Kathmandu and the Terai. A section of the Madan Bhandari (Inner Terai) Highway originates here and connects to Hetauda in the west. Long-route vehicles are available from here to major cites like Kathmandu, Pokhara, Biratnagar, Hetauda, Janakpur and Birgunj. Janakpur Airport is the closest major airport to the town, located about 70 kilometers away.

Locally, auto rickshaws have become common mode of transport within the town.

== Education ==
Sindhulimadhi is the main educational hub of Sindhuli District with many private and public schools and colleges located in the town.
