= Ranibas, Sindhuli =

Ranibas रानीबास
- Village development committee
- Location in Nepal
- Coordinates: 27°3′0″N 86°2′0″E
- Country: Nepal
- Zone: Janakpur Zone
- District: Sindhuli District
- Current Part of: Kamalamai Municipality

Population (1991)
  - Total: 3,911
- Time zone: UTC+5:45 (Nepal Time)

Ranibas was a village development committee in Sindhuli District in the Janakpur Zone of south-eastern Nepal. At the time of the 1991 Nepal census it had a population of 3,911 people living in 688 individual households. It is currently Ward No. 13 and 14 of Kamalamai Municipality.
