= Bhadrakali, Nepal =

Bhadrakali भद्रकाली
- Village Development Committee
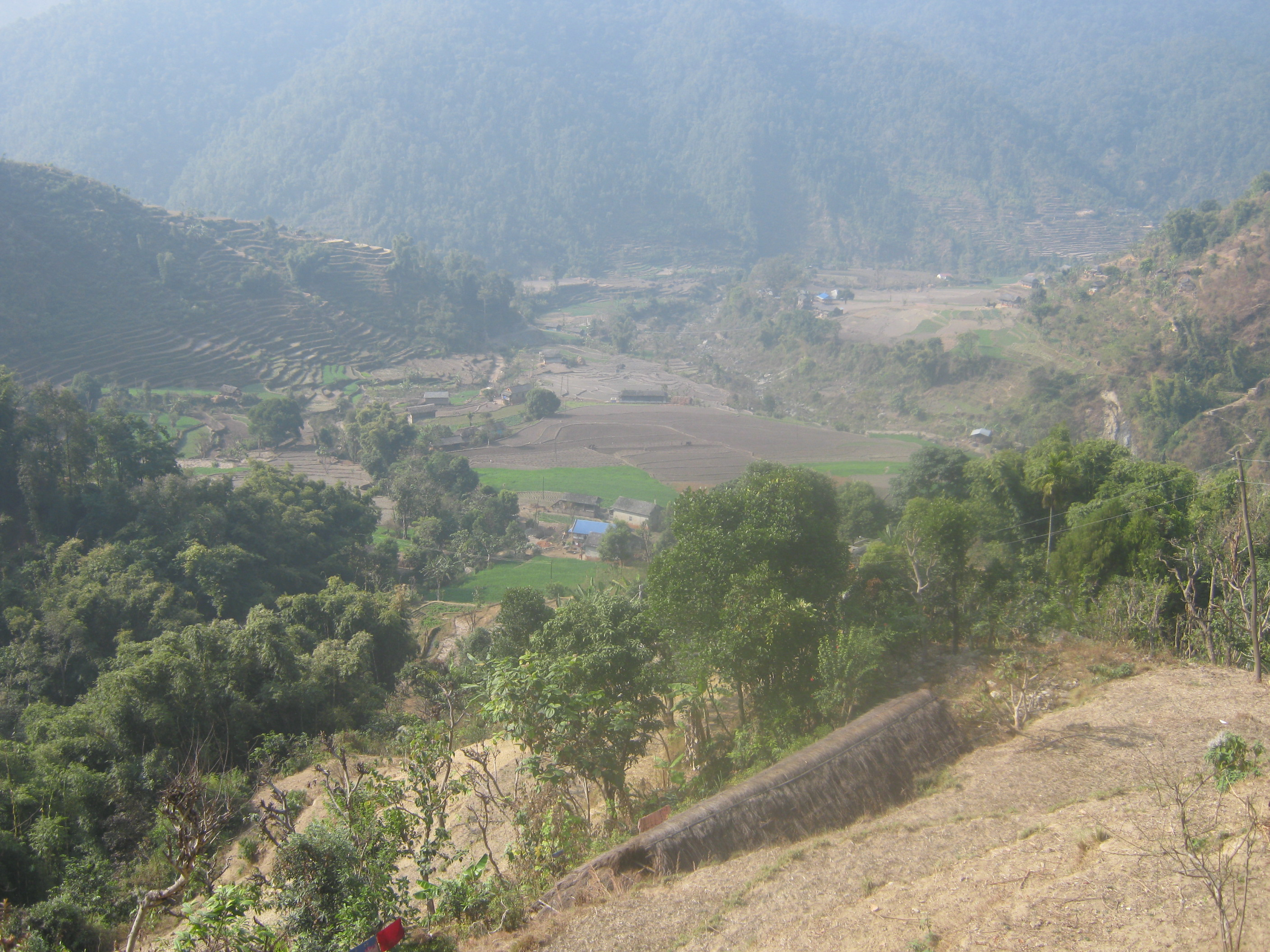
- Bhadrakali VDC in Sindhuli District, Nepal

- Location in Nepal
- Coordinates: 27°17′0″N 85°54′0″E
- Country: Nepal
- Zone: Janakpur Zone
- District: Sindhuli District
- Current part of: Kamalamai Municipality

Population (1991)
  - Total: 3,621
- Time zone: UTC+5:45 (Nepal Time)

Bhadrakali was a village development committee in Sindhuli District in the Janakpur Zone of south-eastern Nepal. At the time of the 1991 Nepal census it had a population of 3,621 people living in 619 individual households. It is currently Ward No. 2 of Kamalamai Municipality.
