= Tamakoshi Corridor =

Highway in Nepal

Tamakoshi Corridor तामाकोशी करिडोर
- राष्ट्रिय राजमार्ग २८
- National Highway 28
- NH28 in red

Route information
- Maintained by MoPIT (Department of Roads)
- Length: 281 km (175 mi)

Location
- Country: Nepal
- Provinces: Madhesh Province, Bagmati Province
- Districts: Mahottari District, Sindhuli District, Ramechhap District, Dolakha District

Highway system
- Roads in Nepal
← NH27	→ NH29

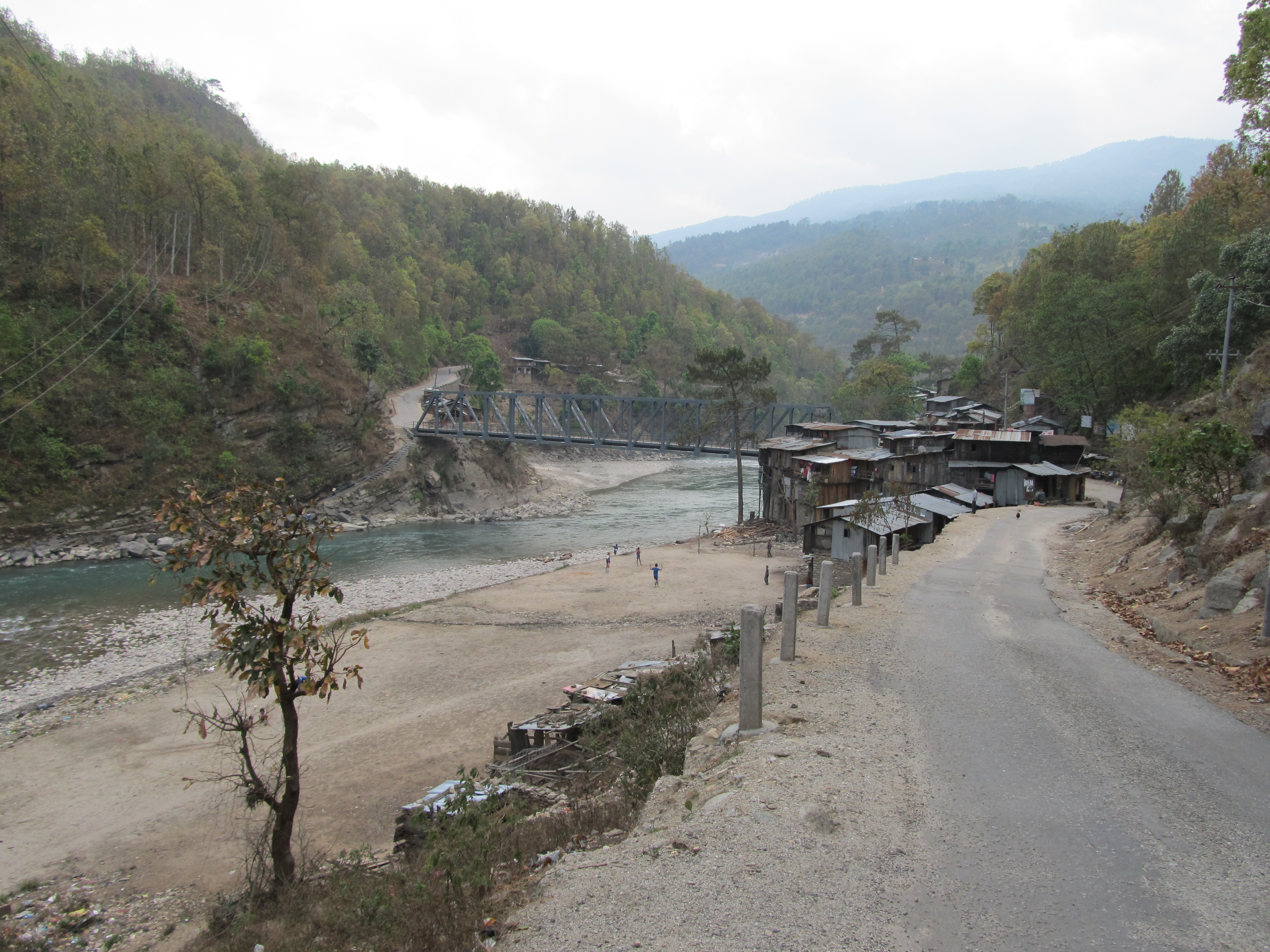
Tamakoshi Corridor near Tamakoshi Bazar (Bhimeshwor Municipality)

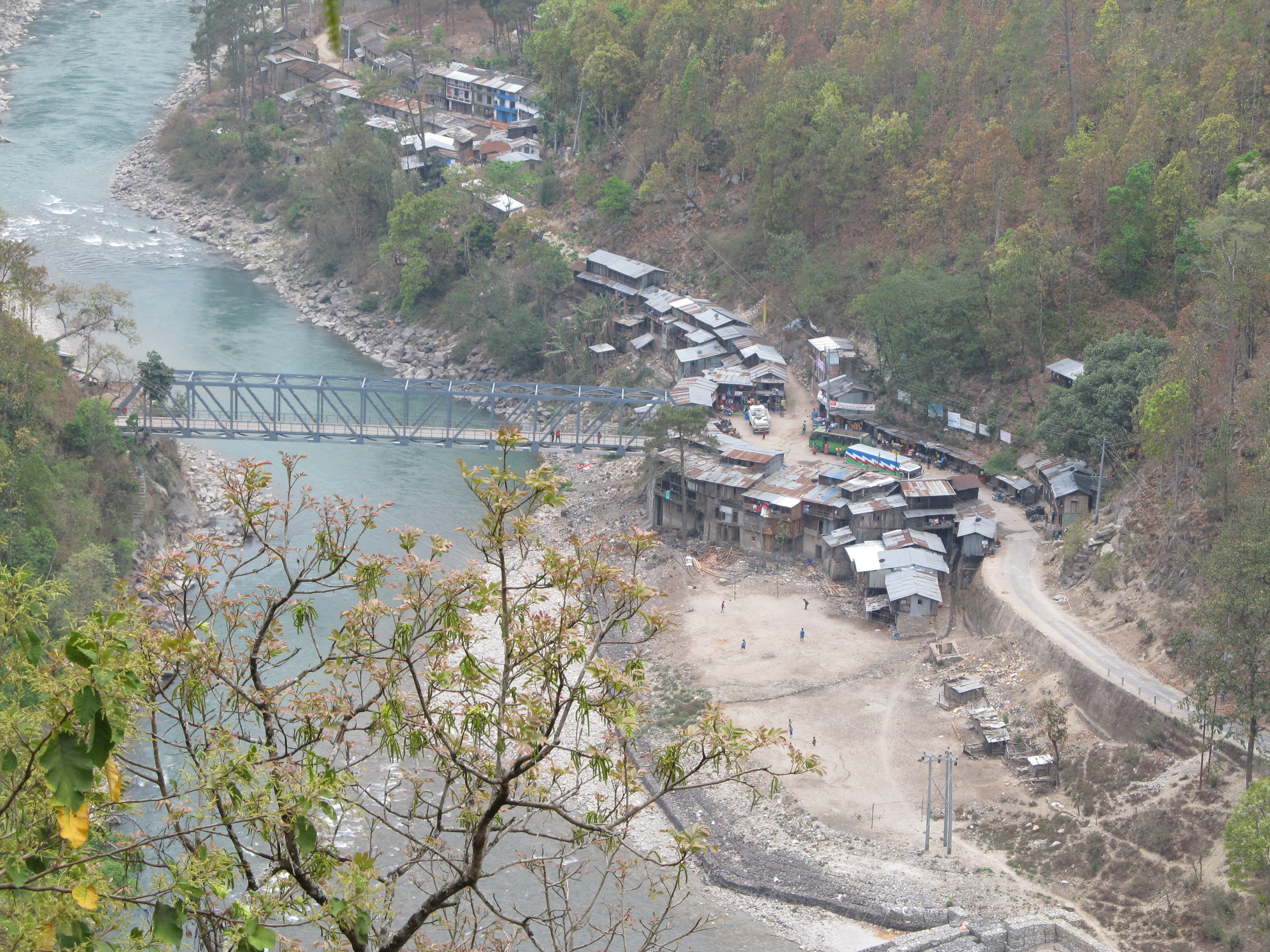
Tamakoshi Corridor along the Tamakoshi River near Tamakoshi Bazar

NH28 (Tamakoshi Corridor) is a National Highway of Nepal located between Madhesh and Bagmati Provinces of Nepal. The total length of the highway is 281 kilometres (175 mi).

This Highway is divided into two sections. The first section is called Jaleshwar-Bardibas road and the second section is called Khurkot-Lapchegaun road or Tamakoshi Corridor.

== Jaleshwar-Bardibas Road ==
The Jaleshwar-Bardibas Road, located in Madhesh Province is a 50.44 kilometres (31.34 mi) long two-lane road that starts near the Indo-Nepal border at Bhittamod and runs northeast to Jaleshwar, a distance of 4.17 kilometres (2.59 mi). From there it proceeds, to Bakharibhath which is located 4.27 kilometres (2.65 mi) away from Jaleshwar. The road then moves northward, straight to Bardibas, which is 42 kilometres (26 mi) away. The road terminates at Bardibas merging with NH13 thereby completing the first section.

== Tamakoshi Corridor ==
The second section of the road runs in Bagmati Province. it starts at Khurkot extracting from NH13. It crosses the Sunkoshi River and enters into Ramechhap District. It runs along the Sunkoshi river towards Benighat. Tamakoshi River confluences with Sunkoshi River at Benighat. From Benighat the road runs along the Tamakoshi river up to Khimti via Manthali. At Khimti the road crosses the Khimti Khola (Khola=small river) and enters into Dolakha District. It continues to follow the Tamakoshi river up to Tamakoshi Bazar where it terminates being merged with NH23. The road again starts at Charikot extracting from the NH23 and runs towards Lamidanda passing Dolakha Town. It again follows Tamakoshi River from Lamidanda and continue runs through mountains, jungle, (Gaurishankar Conservation Area) up to the Nepal-China border, Lapchegaun.
