= Pashupatinagar, Mahottari =

Coordinates: 26°54′N 85°53′E

Pashupatinagar पशुपतिनगर Bandra (बन्द्रा)
- Former Village Development Committee
- Interactive map of Pashupatinagar
- Country: Nepal
- Province: Madhesh Province
- District: Mahottari District
- Part of: Bardibas Municipality

Population (1991)
  - Total: 3,241
- Time zone: UTC+5:45 (Nepal Time)
- Postal code: 044
- Area code: 044

Pashupatinagar (Nepali: पशुपतिनगर) is a settlement in Bardibas Municipality, Ward No.9 in Mahottari District in the Madhesh Province of south-eastern Nepal. At the time of the 1991 Nepal census it had a population of 3,241 people living in 561 individual households. Pashupatinagar is situated 10 kilometers south of Bardibas. Pashupatinagar produces maize consistent with agricultural production in the rest of the Terai Region. In pashupatinagar less than100 years ago there was hardle any human homes and lot of forest, so this village was called jhakhuletol and many monkeys are in Pashupatinagar forest so this village was called Bandra. There is one government school, shree rastriya higher secondary school Banarjhulla-2. There is one police post which is in ward no.2. In pashupatinagar there are residents of various castes, including Yadav, Mahato, Sah, Chamar, Magar, etc. There is one market in Pathalaiya Bazar which is situated in ward number 9. There is only one source of water, which dries in the months of चैत्र, वैशाख and जेष्ठ (appx. mid-March through mid-June).
