= Dandiguranse =

Village development committee in Janakpur Zone, Nepal

Dandiguranse डाँडीगुराँसे
- Village Development Committee
- Location in Nepal
- Coordinates: 27°13′0″N 85°49′0″E
- Country: Nepal
- Zone: Janakpur Zone
- District: Sindhuli District
- Current Part of: Kamalamai Municipality

Population (1991)
  - Total: 2,608
- Time zone: UTC+5:45 (Nepal Time)

Dandiguranse was a village development committee in Sindhuli District in the Janakpur Zone of south-eastern Nepal. At the time of the 1991 Nepal census it had a population of 2,608 living in 450 individual households. It is currently Ward No. 1 of Kamalamai Municipality.
