= Kisan Nagar =

Kisan Nagar किसान नगर
- Former Village Development Committee
- Location in Nepal
- Coordinates: 26.94°N 85.90°E
- Country: Nepal
- Province: Madhesh Province
- District: Mahottari District
- Part of: Bardibas Municipality

Population (1991)
  - Total: 6,681
- Time zone: UTC+5:45 (Nepal Time)

Kisan Nagar was a village development committee in Mahottari District in the Janakpur Zone of south-eastern Nepal. At the time of the 1991 Nepal census it had a population of 6681 people living in 1189 individual households. Later it was merged with Bardibas Municipality.
