= Jalkanya =

Jalakanya जलकन्या
- Village Development Committee
- Location in Nepal
- Coordinates: 27°17′30″N 85°57′0″E
- Country: Nepal
- Zone: Janakpur Zone
- District: Sindhuli District
- Current part of: Kamalamai Municipality

Population (1991)
  - Total: 1,955
- Time zone: UTC+5:45 (Nepal Time)

Jalkanya, also spelled Jalakanya was a village development committee in Sindhuli District in the Janakpur Zone of south-eastern Nepal. At the time of the 1991 Nepal census it had a population of 1,955 people living in 322 individual households. It is currently Ward No. 3 of Kamalamai Municipality.
