= Gauribas =

Gauribas गौरीबास Gauridanda (गौरीडाँडा)
- Former Village Development Committee
- Location in Madhesh Province, Nepal Gauribas (Nepal)
- Coordinates: 27°03′16″N 85°54′28″E
- Country: Nepal
- Province: Madhesh Province
- District: Mahottari District
- Part of: Bardibas Municipality

Government
  - Type: Ward within a Municipality

Population (2021)
  - Total: 8,603
- Time zone: UTC+5:45 (Nepal Time)

Gauribas (Nepali: गौरीबास), commonly known as Gauridanda (Nepali: गौरीडाँडा), is a settlement and a ward (Ward No. 3) within Bardibas Municipality in Mahottari District, Madhesh Province of south-eastern Nepal. Previously, it was recognized as a Village Development Committee (VDC). Following the restructuring of local levels in Nepal, Gauribas was integrated into Bardibas Municipality.

As of the 2021 Nepal census, the population of Ward No. 3 (Gauribas) is 8,603.

Historically, at the time of the 1991 Nepal census, Gauribas VDC had a population of 4,308 people living in 810 individual households.

== Media ==
To promote local culture, Gauribas has one FM radio station, Radio Sungava 107 MHZ, which is a community radio station.
