= Nirmal Lama Polytechnic Institute =

Coordinates: 27.0724°N 85.8044°E

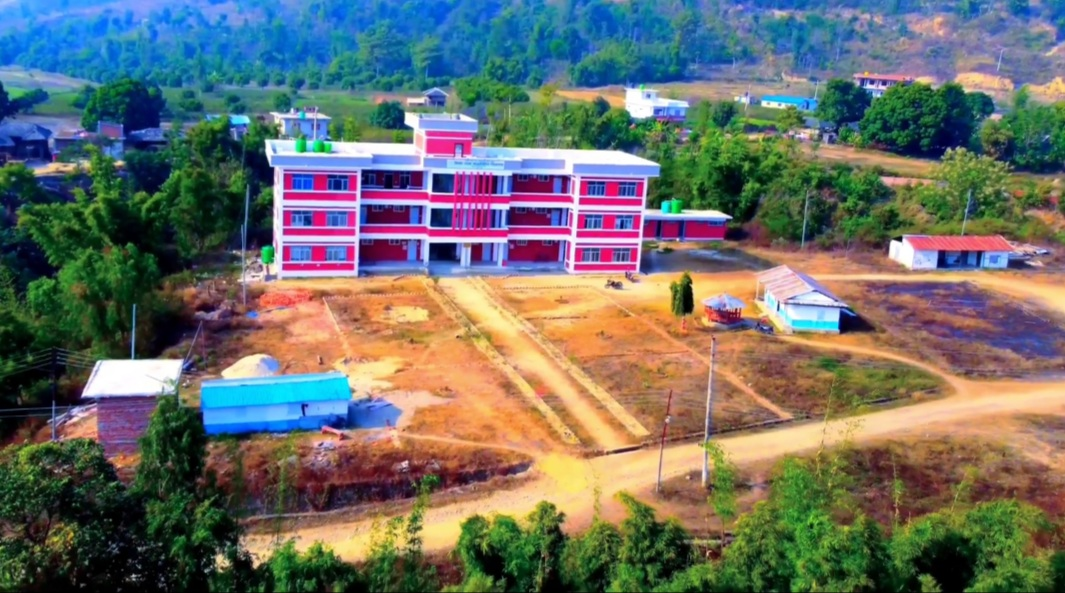
Nirmal Lama Polytechnic Institute, Bardibas

Nirmal Lama Polytechnic Institute (NLPI) (Nepali: निर्मल लामा बहुप्राविधिक शिक्षालय) is a technical institute under CTEVT located in Khayarmara of Bardibas Municipality in Mahottari district of Nepal. It was established in 2018. NLPI is a public institute providing Technical and Vocational Education and Training (TEVT) courses.

== Academics ==
The academic courses provided by NLPI are mainly 3 years diploma courses on civil engineering, geomatics engineering, pharmacy, forestry, hotel management, food/dairy technology, 3 years Certificate in diagnostic radiography and Pre-diploma courses on civil engineering and survey engineering.
