= Khaya Mara =

Khaya Mara खयरमारा
- Former Village Development Committee
- Location in Nepal
- Coordinates: 26.9025°N 85.8689°E
- Country: Nepal
- Province: Madhesh Province
- District: Mahottari District
- Part of: Bardibas Municipality

Government
  - Ward Chairpersons: Purna Bahadur Bal (Ward 10), Pramod Kumar Moktan (Ward 11)

Population (2021)
  - Total: 8,502
- Time zone: UTC+5:45 (Nepal Time)

Khaya Mara is a town located in Wards 10 and 11 of Bardibas Municipality in the Mahottari District of Madhesh Province, south-eastern Nepal. Previously a separate village development committee, it was later integrated into the municipality system of Nepal. According to the 2021 Nepal census, it had a population of 8,502 people living in 1,163 individual households.
