= Siddheshwar, Sindhuli =

Siddheshwar सिद्धेश्वर
- Village development committee
- Location in Nepal
- Coordinates: 27.2104°N 85.9124°E
- Country: Nepal
- Zone: Janakpur Zone
- District: Sindhuli District
- Current Part of: Kamalamai Municipality
- Incorporated as Kamalamai Municipality: 1997

Population (1991)
  - Total: 16,759
- Time zone: UTC+5:45 (Nepal Time)

Siddheshwar was a village development committee (VDC) in Sindhuli District in the Janakpur Zone of south-eastern Nepal. At the time of the 1991 Nepal census it had a population of 16,759 people living in 3,080 individual households.

The VDC contained district headquarter Sindhulimadhi, and surrounding areas. It was merged with Bhiman VDC in 1997 A.D (2053 B.S) to form Kamalamai Municipality. It currently falls under wards 4-8 (previous wards 1-9) of Kamalamai Municipality.
