= Madan Bhandari Inner Terai Highway =

Road in Nepal

Madan Bhandari Inner Terai Highway मदन भण्डारी भित्री मधेश राजमार्ग
- राष्ट्रिय राजमार्ग ०९
- National Highway 09
- NH09 in red
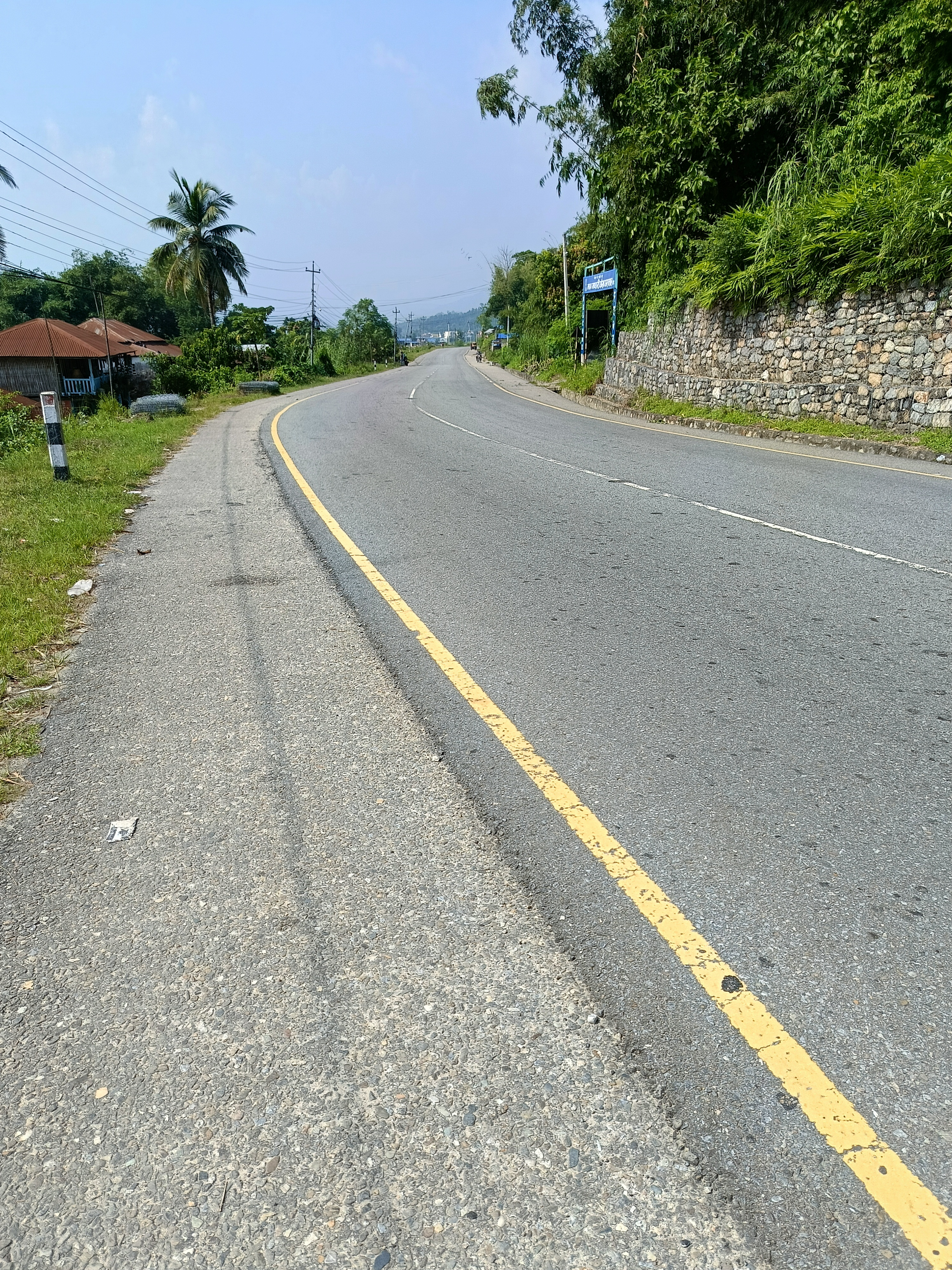
- Madan Bhandari Highway (NH09), west of Gaighat Bazar in Triyuga.jpg

Route information
- Maintained by MoPIT (Department of Roads)
- Length: 1,200 km (750 mi)
- History: Under Construction

Major junctions
- East end: Bahundangi
- Dharan, Gaighat, Sindhulimadhi, Hetauda, Gaindakot, Shimaltari, Pyuthan, Ghorahi, Surkhet, VP Nagar, Jogbudha
- West end: Rupal

Location
- Country: Nepal
- Provinces: Koshi, Bagmati, Gandaki, Lumbini, Karnali, Sudurpashchim

Highway system
- Roads in Nepal
← NH08	→ NH10

Madan Bhandari Inner Terai Highway or NH09 (Nepali: मदन भण्डारी भित्री मधेश राजमार्ग) is an ongoing road project in Nepal, which is thought to be 1,200 kilometres (750 mi) long from east to west. It starts at Shantinagar in Jhapa District of Koshi Province and runs through Inner Terai (Dun valleys) area. It ends at Rupal in Dadeldhura District of Sudurpashchim Province. It is an alternative road to the east–west Mahendra Highway (NH-1). The highway will be located 25 to 30 km to the north of Mahendra Highway and 25 to 30 km south of the Pushpalal Highway.

The 315-kilometre-long section of the highway from Dharan to Hetauda had already been awarded and construction works are ongoing.

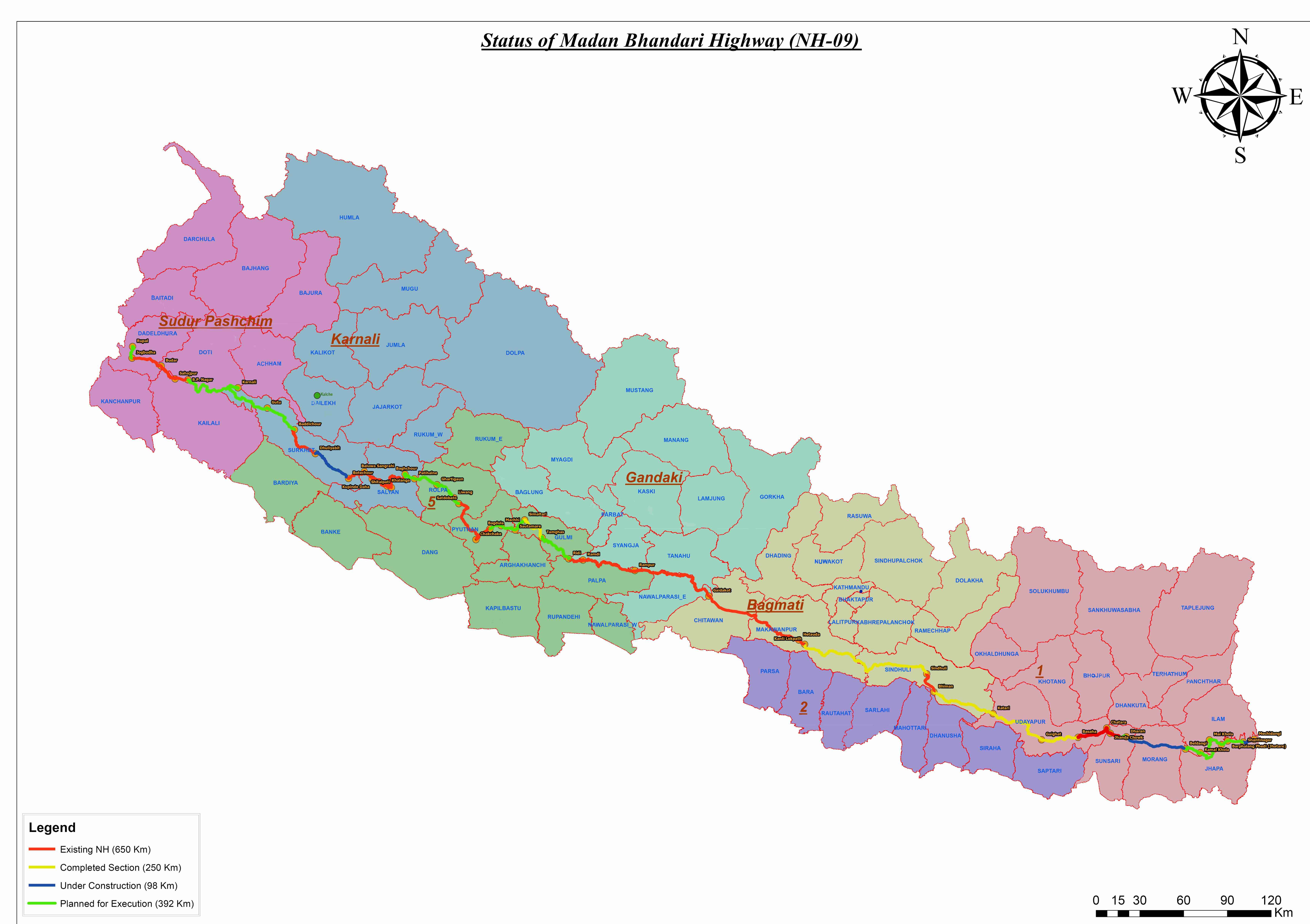
Madan Bhandari Highway map

== See also ==
- Mahendra East-West Terai Highway
- Pushpalal Mid Hill Highway
