= National Highway 27 (Nepal) =

Highway in Nepal

Sitalpati-Raikar Highway सितलपाटी-रैकर राजमार्ग
- राष्ट्रिय राजमार्ग २७
- National Highway 27
- NH27 in red

Route information
- Maintained by MoPIT (Department of Roads)
- Length: 39.42 km (24.49 mi)

Major junctions
- East end: Shitalpati
- West end: Raikar

Location
- Country: Nepal
- Provinces: Karnali Province
- Districts: Salyan

Highway system
- Roads in Nepal
← NH26	→ NH28

National Highway 27 (Shitalpati - Raikar) is a National Highway of Nepal, located in Salyan District of Karnali Province. The total length of the highway is 39.42 kilometres (24.49 mi).
