= Hathilet =

Hathilet हाथिलेट
- Former Village Development Committee
- Location in Nepal
- Coordinates: 26.96°N 85.86°E
- Country: Nepal
- Province: Madhesh Province
- District: Mahottari District
- Part of: Bardibas Municipality

Government
  - Type: Ward within a Municipality

Population (2021)
  - Total: 5,828
- Time zone: UTC+5:45 (Nepal Time)

Hathilet (Nepali: हातीलेट) is a settlement located in Bardibas Municipality, Ward No. 8, in Mahottari District of Madhesh Province, south-eastern Nepal. It was previously recognized as a village development committee (VDC) until Nepal's restructuring of local governance, which merged former VDCs into larger municipalities.

As per the 2021 Nepal census, the population of Hathilet (now part of Bardibas Municipality) is 5,828.

At the time of the 1991 Nepal census, it had a population of 4,445 people living in 860 individual households.
