= NATHM Bardibas =

Academy in Madhesh Province, Nepal

NATHM Bardibas is an educational institution located in Bardibas Municipality, Mahottari District of Nepal. It was established in 2020 by the Government of Nepal in partnership with Kathmandu University. The academy is headed by Shivendra Mallik. It is a branch of the Nepal Academy of Tourism and Hotel Management (NATHM), based in Ravi Bhawan, Kathmandu. NATHM was established in 1971 and operates under the Ministry of Culture, Tourism and Civil Aviation.

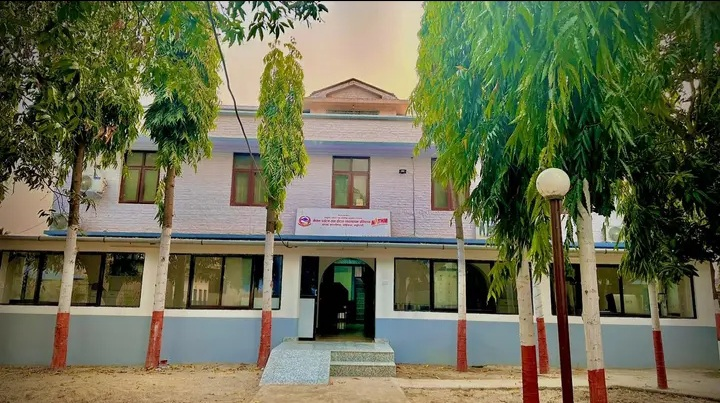
NATHM Bardibas

== Academics & Trainings ==
NATHM Bardibas provides academic program like Bachelor in Hospitality Management (BHM) with the collaboration of Kathmandu University (KU) as well as other training courses related to hotel sector (Food Preparation & Control, Food & Beverage service, Housekeeping, Front Office operation), tours/travel and trekking sector (tourist guide, travel agency ticketing & fare construction, trekking guide, trekking porter guide), mobile outreach training (Homestay training, Hotel Operation Management, Local guide) and on request trainings (Nature guide, river guide, Hospitality awareness, tourist guide refresher course).
