= Maisthan =

Maisthan माइस्थान
- Former Village Development Committee
- Location in Nepal
- Coordinates: 27.06°N 85.85°E
- Country: Nepal
- Province: Madhesh Province
- District: Mahottari District
- Part of: Bardibas Municipality

Population (2021)
  - Total: 5,689
- Time zone: UTC+5:45 (Nepal Time)

Maisthan (माइस्थान) is a settlement in Ward No. 5 of Bardibas Municipality, located in Mahottari District of Madhesh Province, Nepal. It was formerly a separate village development committee (VDC) before being integrated into Bardibas Municipality during the 2015 administrative restructuring.

Maisthan is home to the historic and culturally significant Panchadhura Maisthan Temple, a Hindu temple dedicated to Lord Shiva. The temple is a major religious site in the area and draws many devotees, especially during festivals like Maha Shivaratri.

According to the 2021 Nepal census, Ward No. 5, which includes Maisthan, has a population of 5,689.
