= Ranichuri =

Ranichuri रानीचुरी
- Village Development Committee
- Location in Nepal
- Coordinates: 27°11′0″N 86°0′0″E
- Country: Nepal
- Zone: Janakpur
- Current Part of: Kamalamai Municipality

Population (1991)
  - Total: 7,170
- Time zone: UTC+5:45 (Kathmandu Time)

Ranichuri was a village development committee in Sindhuli District in the Janakpur Zone of south-eastern Nepal. At the time of the 1991 Nepal census it had a population of 7,170 people living in 1,229 individual households. It is currently Ward No. 11 and 12 of Kamalamai Municipality.
