= BP Highway =

Road in Nepal

BP Highway बीपी राजमार्ग
- राष्ट्रिय राजमार्ग १३
- National Highway 13
- BP Highway in red
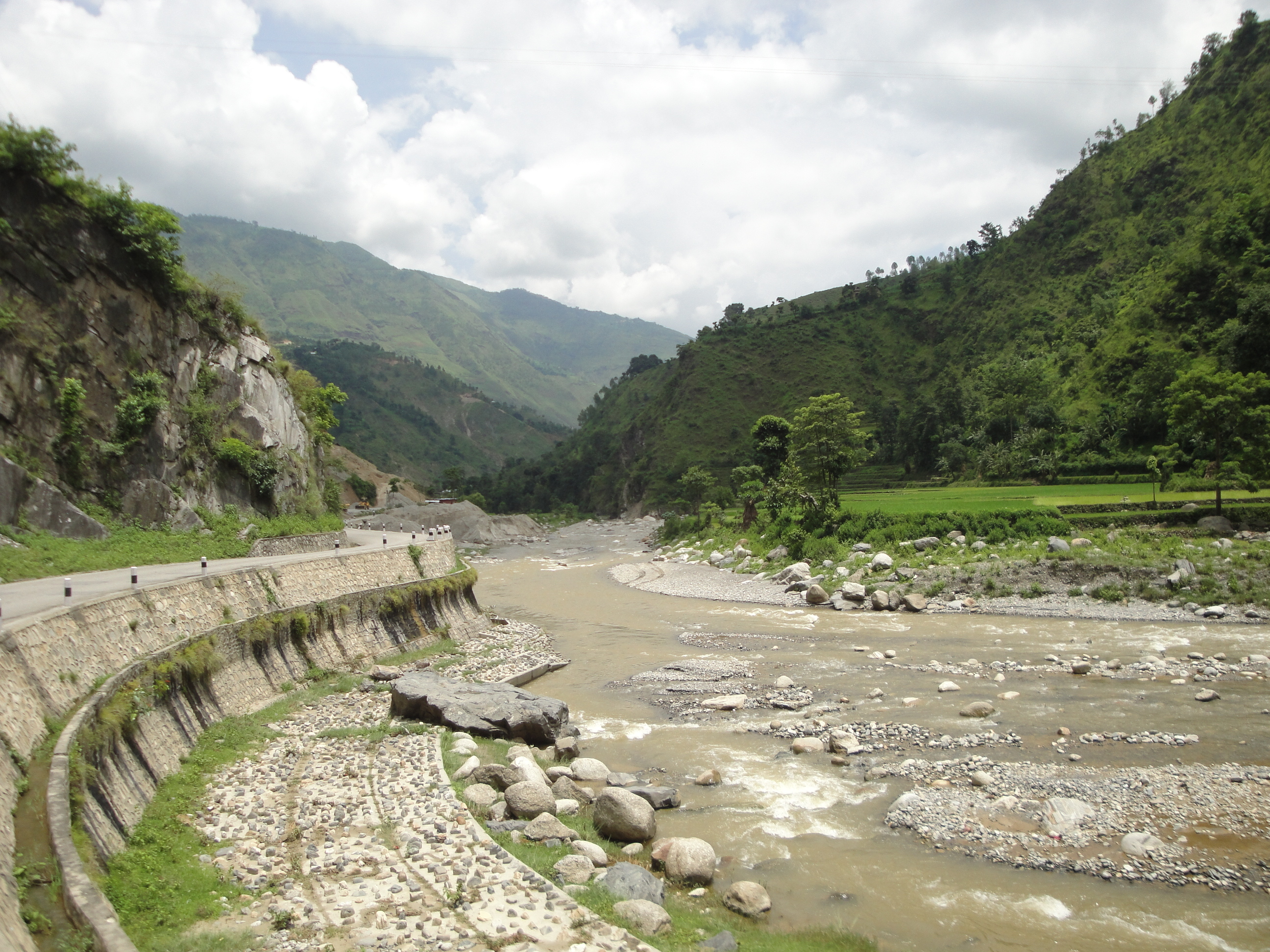

Route information
- Maintained by MoPIT (Department of Roads)
- Length: 160 km (99 mi)

Major junctions
- From: Bardibas, Mahottari
- NH01 at Bardibas NH09 at Bhiman; NH09 at Sindhulimadhi; NH03 at Khurkot; NH28 at Khurkot NH34 at Dhulikhel
- To: Dhulikhel, Kavre

Location
- Country: Nepal
- Primary destinations: Banepa, Dhulikhel, Dumja, Mangaltar, Sindhuli, Bardibas

Highway system
- Roads in Nepal
← NH12	→ NH14

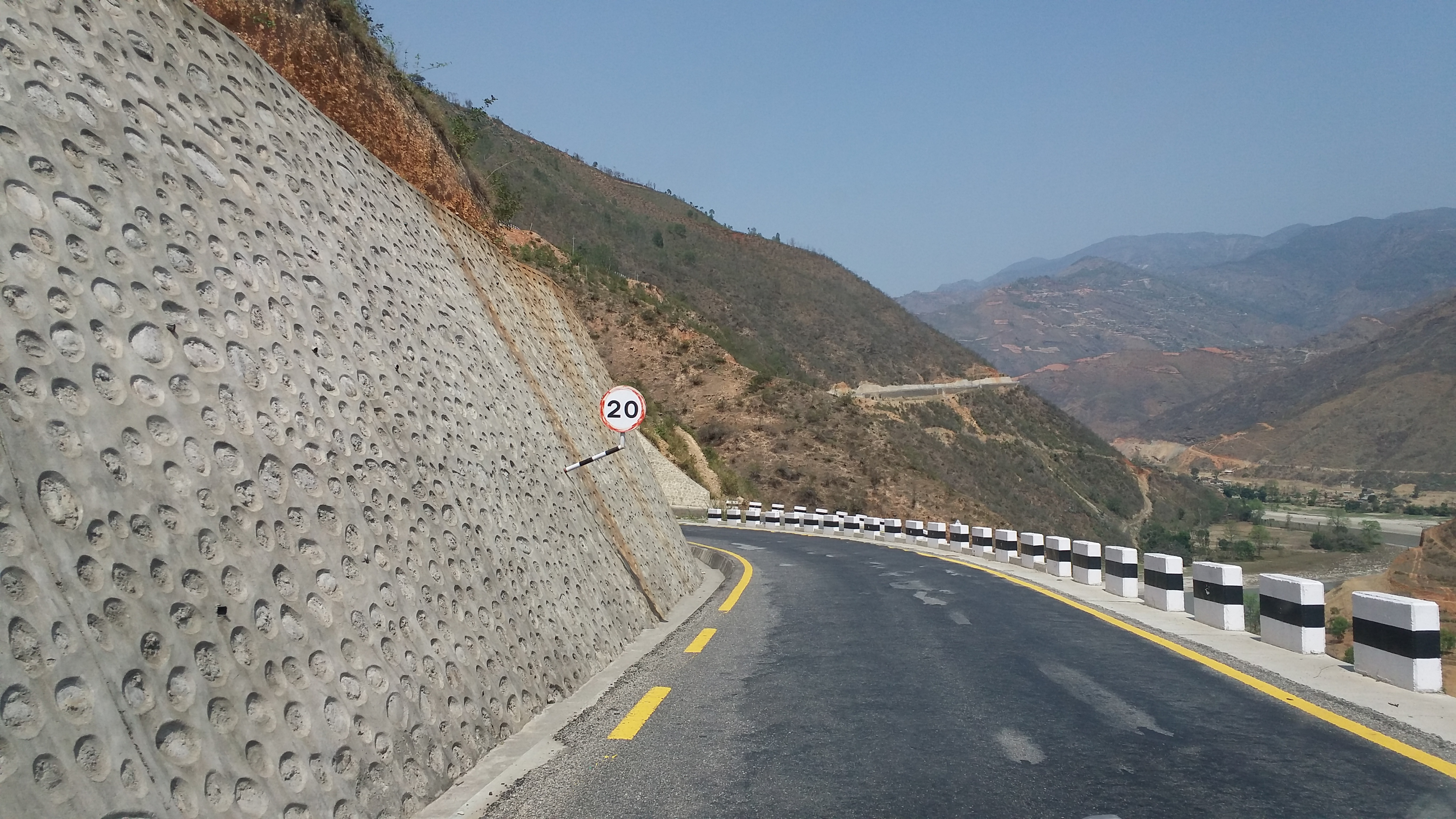
BP Highway

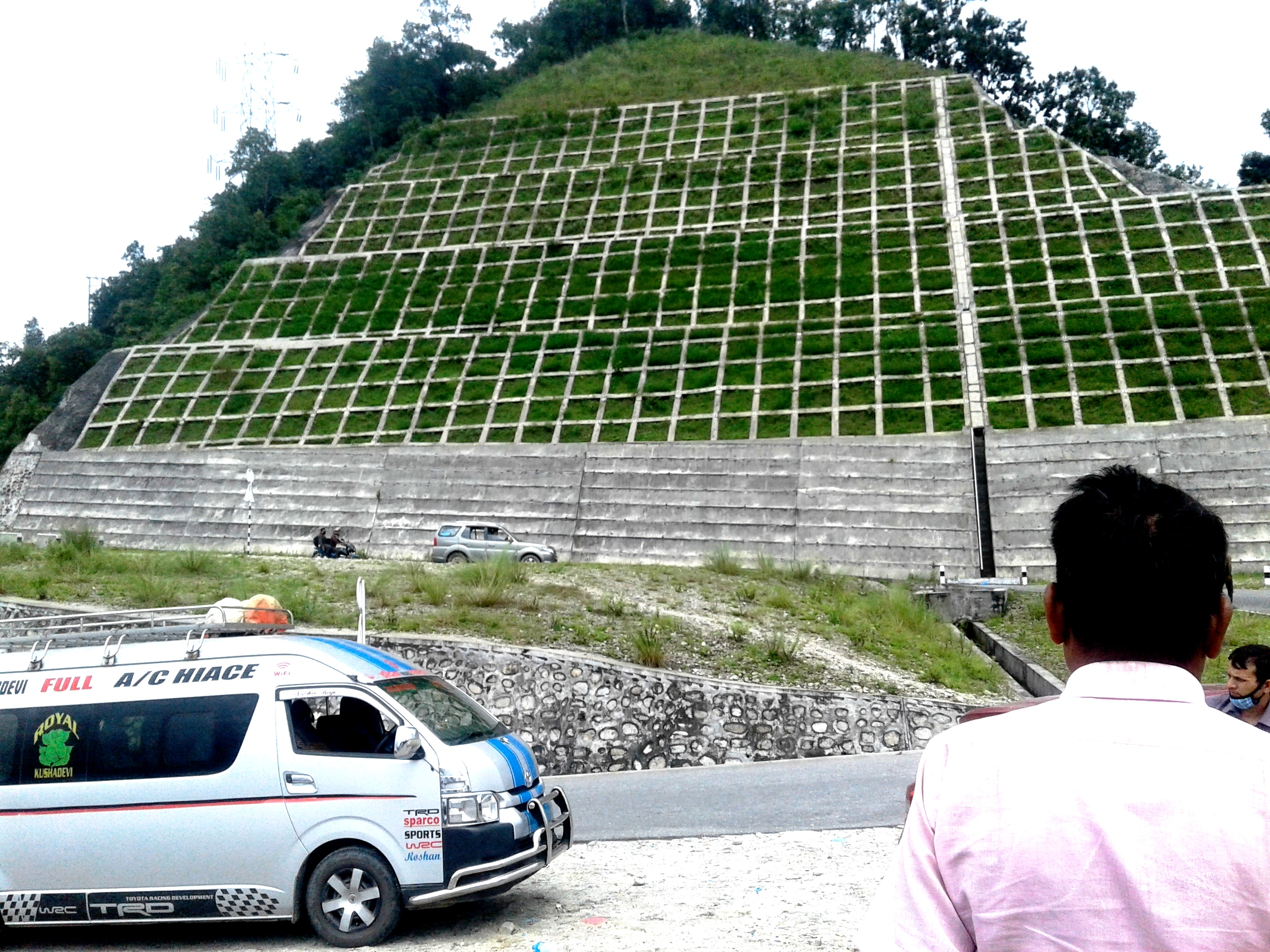
Selfie Danda, BP Highway, Sindhuli

The BP Highway or NH13 (previously: H06) is a highway in eastern Nepal that links Kathmandu Valley with the Eastern Terai region. It is named after the former politician and writer of Nepal, BP Koirala. This highway is the shortest link between Kathmandu Valley and the Madhesh Province that connects the Koshi Province with the capital of Nepal. Construction of the highway began in 1996 and after encountering different issues with materials, manpower and budget, the road was finally completed and handed over to the Nepalese government on 3 July 2015.

== History ==
The construction of Banepa Sindhuli Bardibas Road started in November 1996 with a grant assistance of Government of Japan. The highway was handed over by Japanese ambassador to Nepal Mr. Masashi Ogawa to the then Prime Minister of Nepal Mr. Sushil Koirala. Koirala inaugurated the highway during a ceremony held at Dhulikhel, Kavre.

== Project cost ==
The total cost of the project from start to completion was NPR. 21.5 billion (¥ 26 billion).

== Project phases ==
• Section I Bardibas- Sindhulibazar section (37 km)

• Section II Sindhulibazar- Khurkot section (36 km)

• Section III Khurkot - Nepalthok section (37 km)

• Section IV Nepalthok-Dhulikhel section (50 km)

== Early development plans ==
Out of these sections, construction of Bardibas - Sindhuli Bazar (Sindhulimadhi) section started in November 1996 and was completed in March 1998. The construction of this section included 9 bridges and 17 causeways over the 37 km of road, which was constructed in 1987. This section has been opened to traffic since its completion in 1998.

The construction of Nepalthok-Dhulikhel section started in April 1998 and is under construction. This section includes construction of 50 km of road with 5 bridges and 6 causeways. Out of 50 km, 34 km has been completed and is already open to public traffic while rest of the road was expected to be complete by March 2003.

The construction of Sindhulibazar-Khurkot section was slated to start in January 2001, this section includes construction of 39 km of road with a bridge and 3 causeways. Earthwork over 12.5 km of this road section was completed in the previous phase. This section was expected to be complete by 2007.

== Environmental issues ==
After the promulgation of Environmental Protection Act (EPA) for the first time during the basic design of section II Sindhulibazar Khurkot section, a Complete Environmental Impact Assessment was conducted. Extensive discussion on various aspects on environmental issues was discussed with the local people and their concerns are properly addressed. Furthermore, various slope stabilization techniques has been adopted, this includes use of retaining and breast walls, crib works, gabion works, geotextiles and most interesting being the bio-engineering works which includes the locally available techniques like plantation of trees, shrubs including turfing and the soil seeding method imported from Japan. Though initially this technique has been found little expensive because most of the materials used in this method being imported from Japan and for making this method economical effort has been made to use the locally available materials so that this method could be extensively used in Nepal.

== Other issues ==
In order to effectively address the most common local issues related to local drinking water supply and irrigation channels to the local fields. This project has taken this challenge to properly relocate the existing drinking water supply line and the irrigation channels so that the effect from these could be minimized. Extensive discussion with the locals regarding the environmental issues has been very useful for the project, however the late realization and awareness in these issues is still a challenge to the project to address issues to be faced in later stages of the project execution.

== Technologies used ==
During the construction of the project different innovative technologies have been implemented. Specially Shotcrete has been implemented throughout the highway in order to control landslides. Geotech has been used in order to stabilise the soil in various sections of the highway. It's the first time such technologies have been used in Nepal for constructing highway.

== Route ==
This route is important in that it is the only major eastbound exit from highly populated and quake-prone Kathmandu Valley; it is critical to be completed for emergency evacuation and relief purposes. Currently, Kathmandu relies solely upon one congested westward "highway" for its road links to the south: India, the Terai region, and Bangladesh. The capital region has no rail or navigable river links. Despite this, the highway criss-crosses through mountain regions with hairpin turns of widths of one bus wide in numerous areas.

The entire highway from Kathmandu to Bardibas via Dhulikhel had a project completion date of 2011, for a total of 158 km. It now is projected to be finished in March 2015 The reasons for the delay include Japanese contractors lack of security for explosives, thus the road was created with manual labor, which later there was an admission that this was a mistake., as well as parliament gridlock. This alternate route will reduce the journey from Kathmandu to Bardibas and other cities east of Bardibas by at least 200 km.

The highway has existed in stages for decades, with large unimproved portions. The 37 km section of the lowlands between Bardibas and Sindhuli has been in operation for many years, the 50 km section between Banepa and Nepalthok of Bagmati region was completed in 2005 with Japanese grant money. However, a major part linking the two improved regions was only completed in February 2009, funded with Japanese loans and contractors.

== Gallery ==
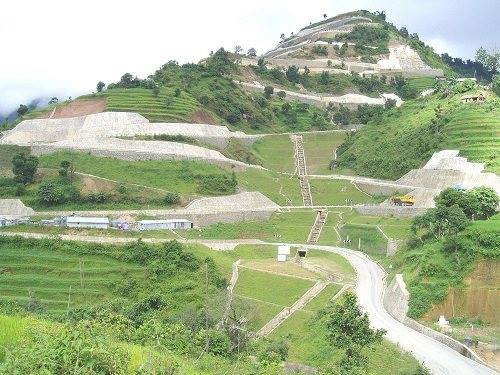
BP Highway Sindhulibazar-Khurkot section at Pipal Bhanjyang

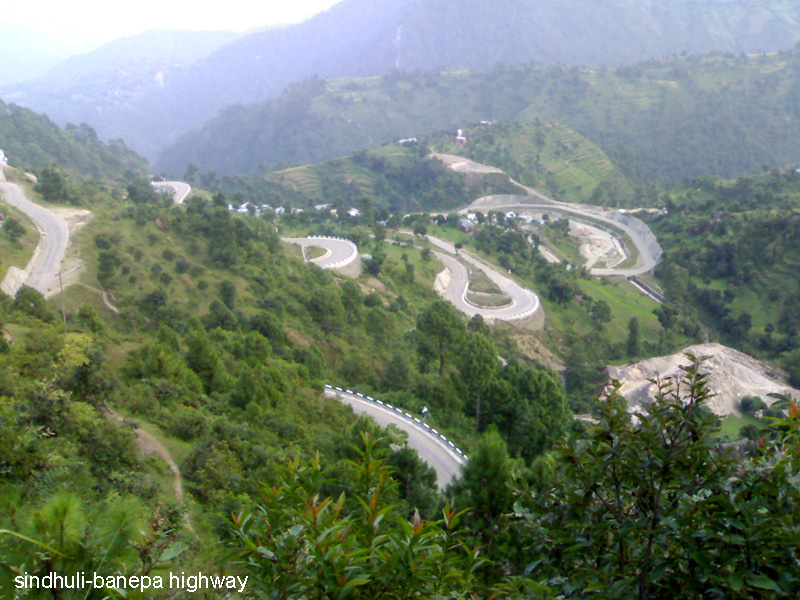
BP highway's Sindhulibazar–Khurkot section

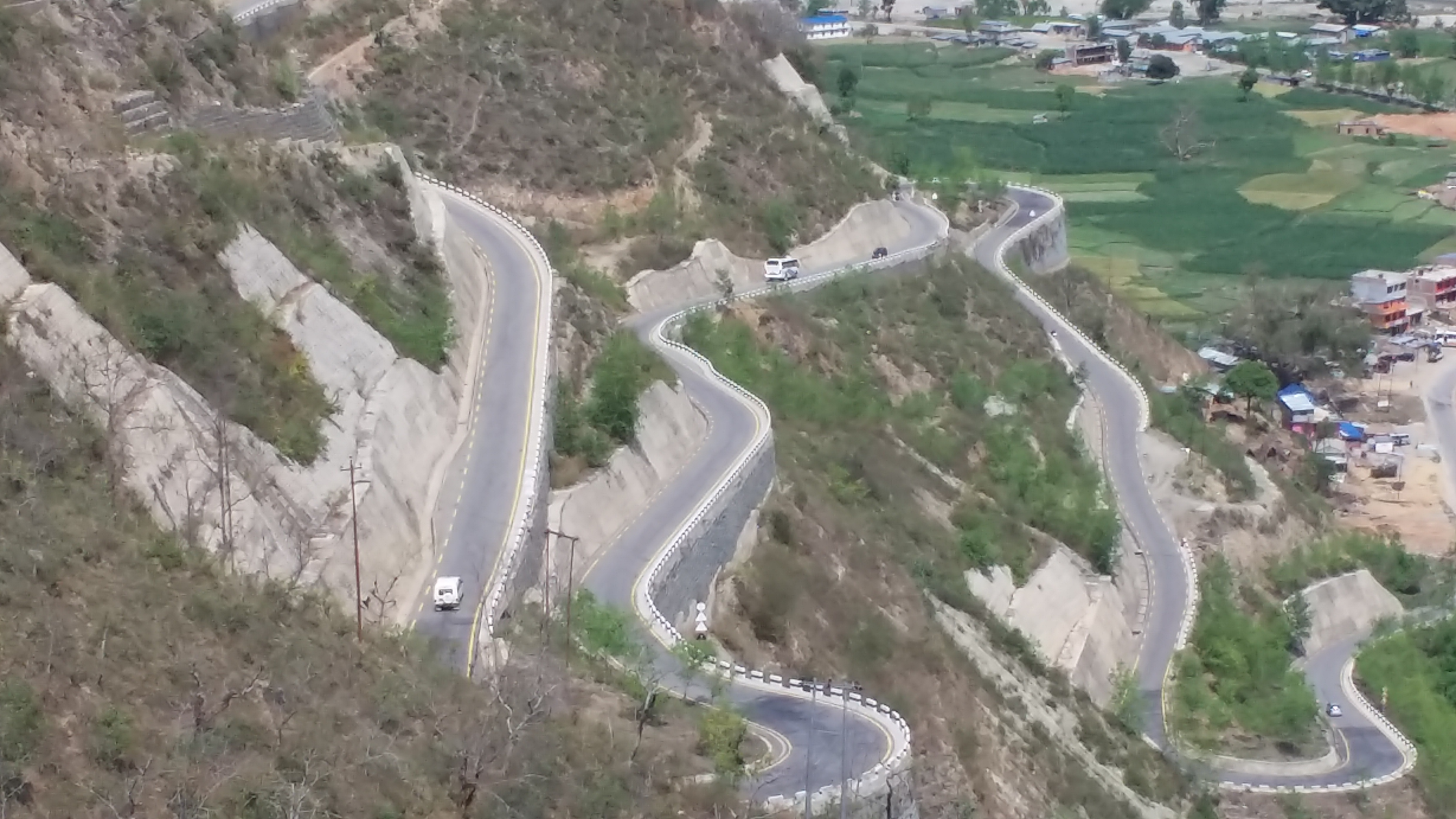
B.P. Highway Khurkot-Nepalthok section at Mulkot

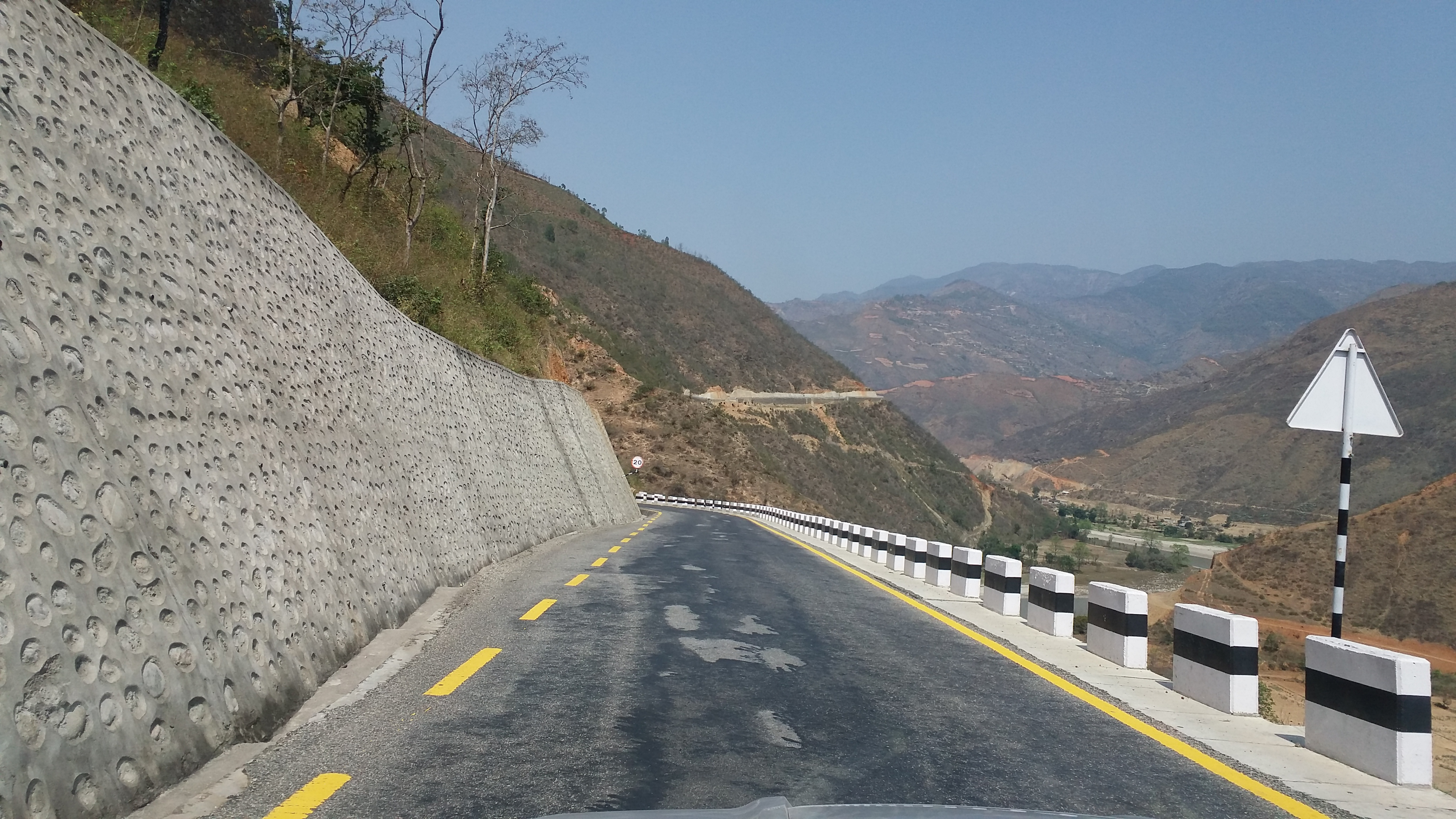
B.P. Highway Khurkot-Nepalthok section

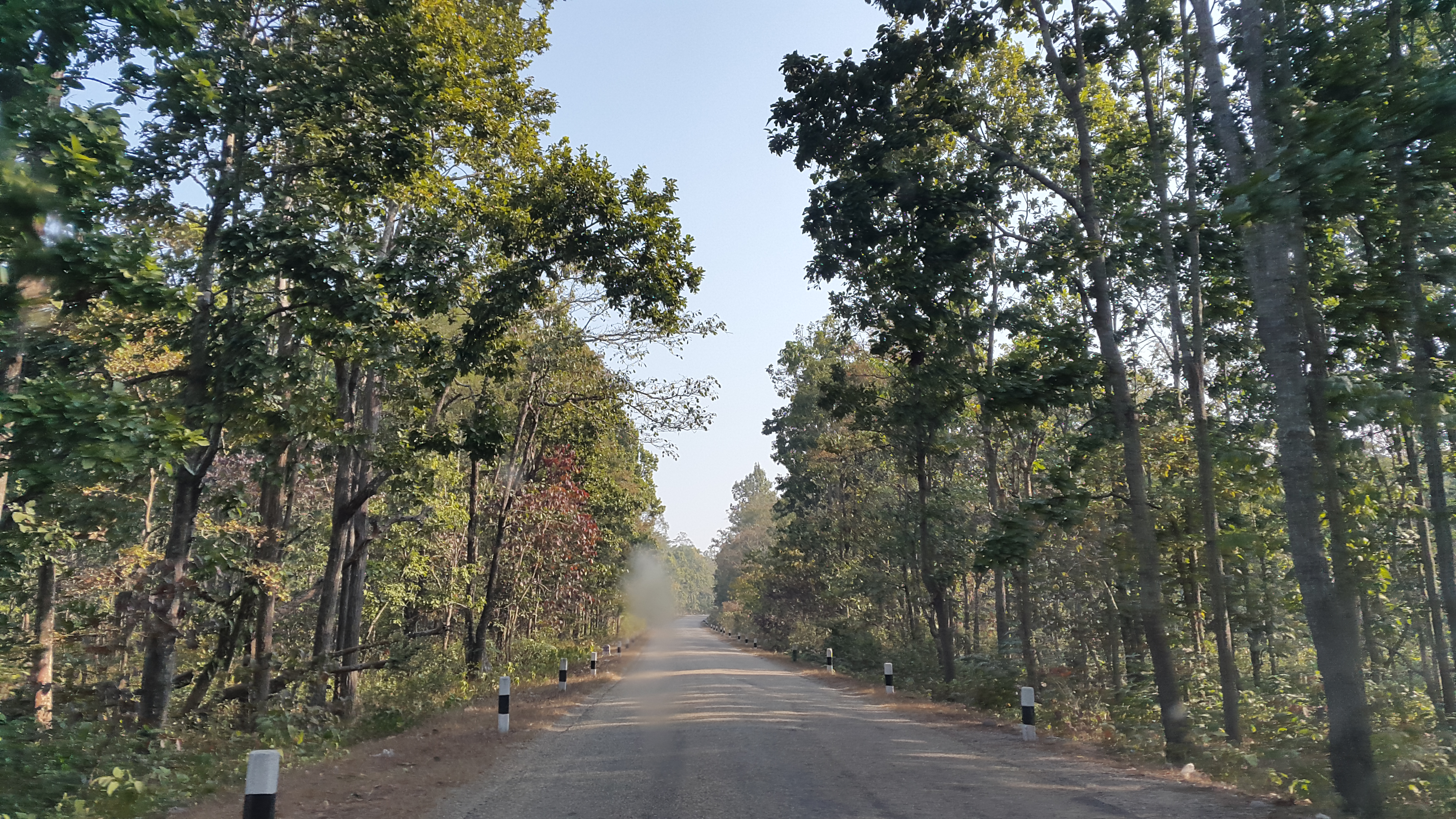
BP Highway Bardibas-Sindhulibazar section

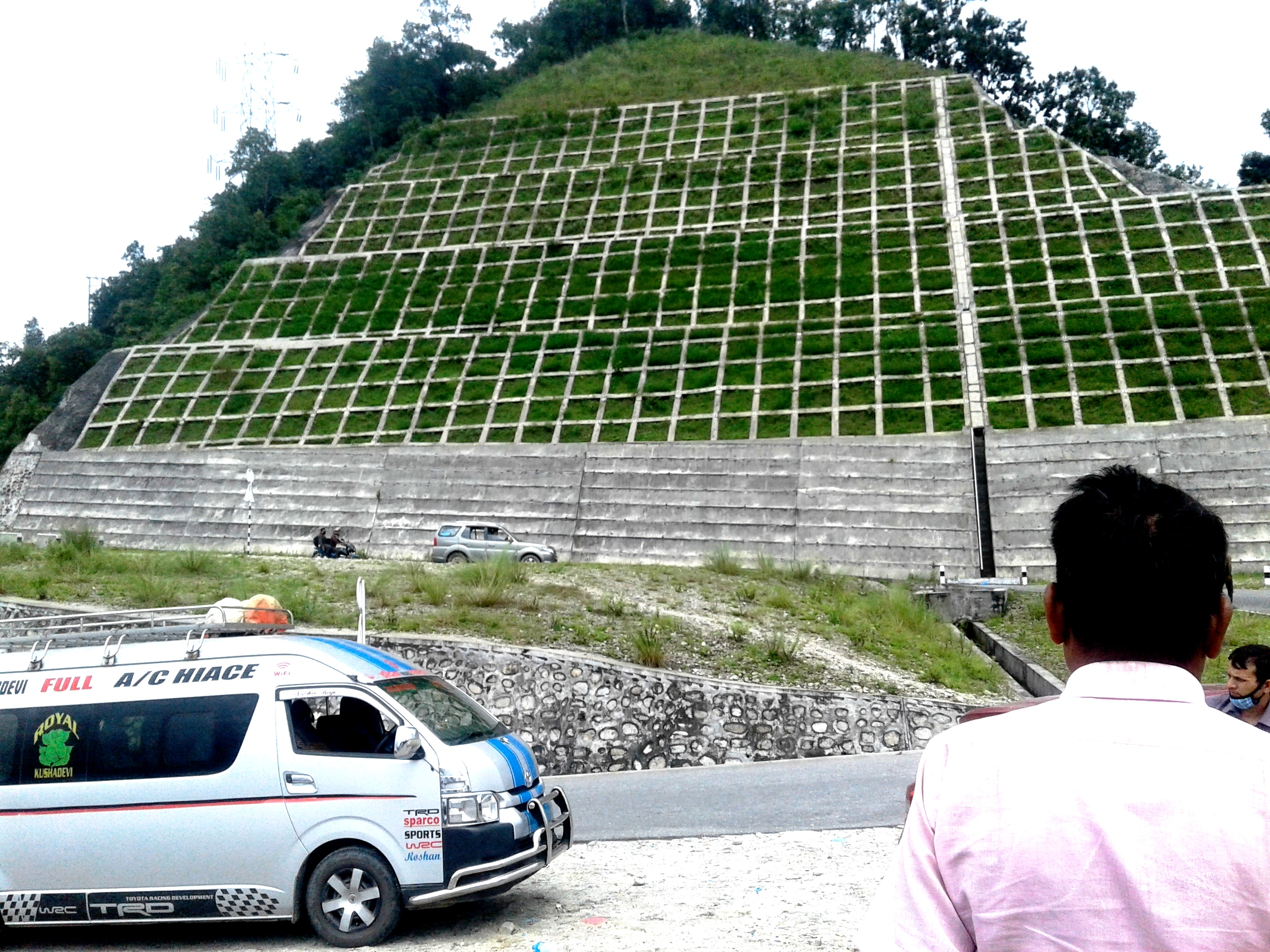
BP Highway at Selfie Danda

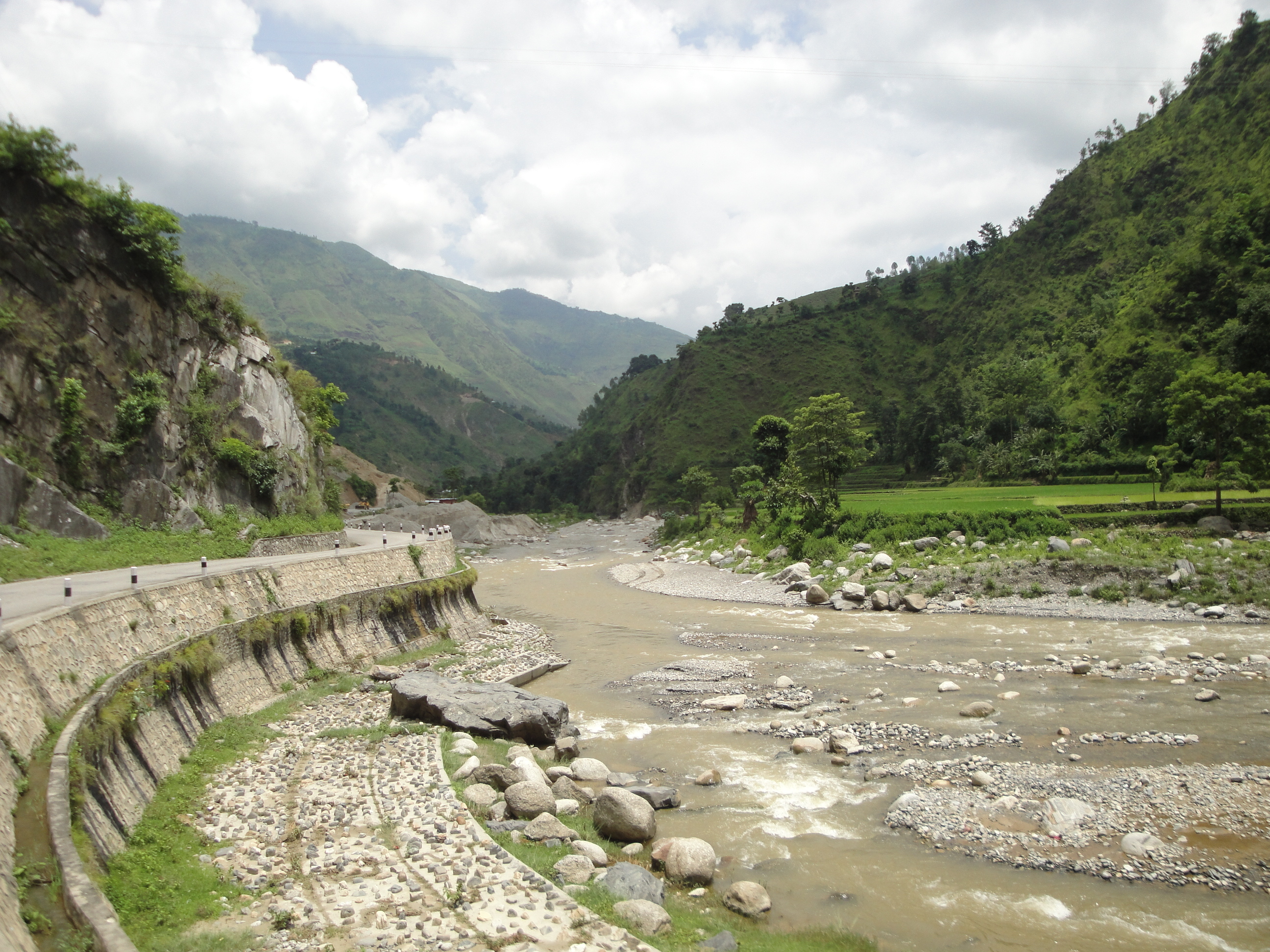
BP Highway Nepalthok-Dhulikhel Section

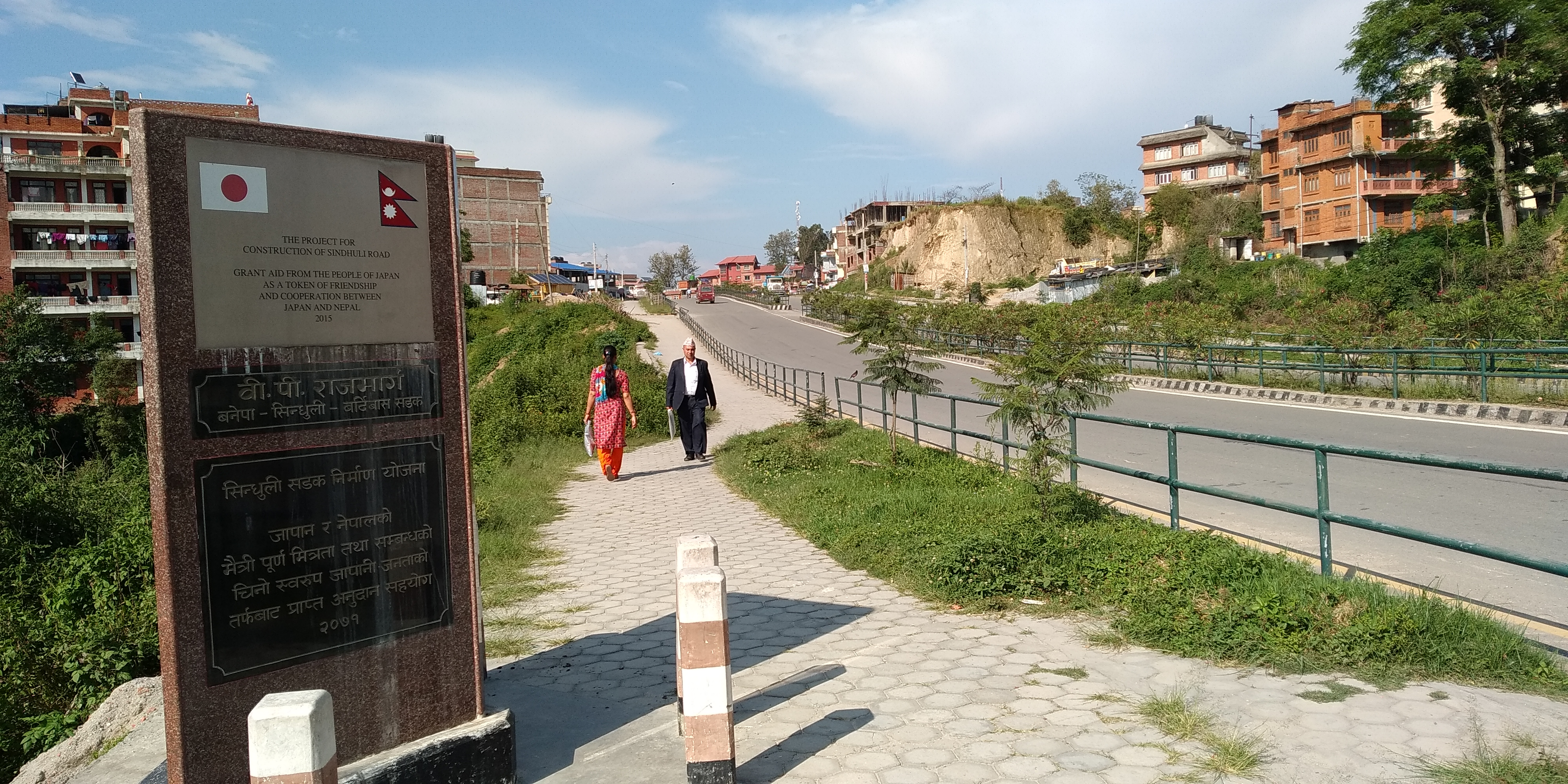
BP Highway at Dhulikhel

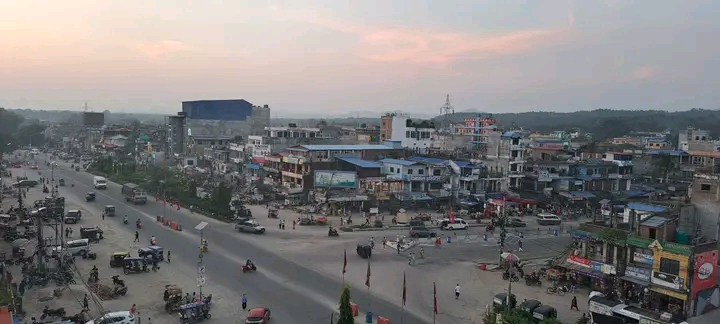
Bardibas Chowk, Junction of BP Highway and Mahendra Highway

== See also ==
- List of national highways in Nepal
