= Rupal, Nepal =

Rupal रूपाल
- Village development committee
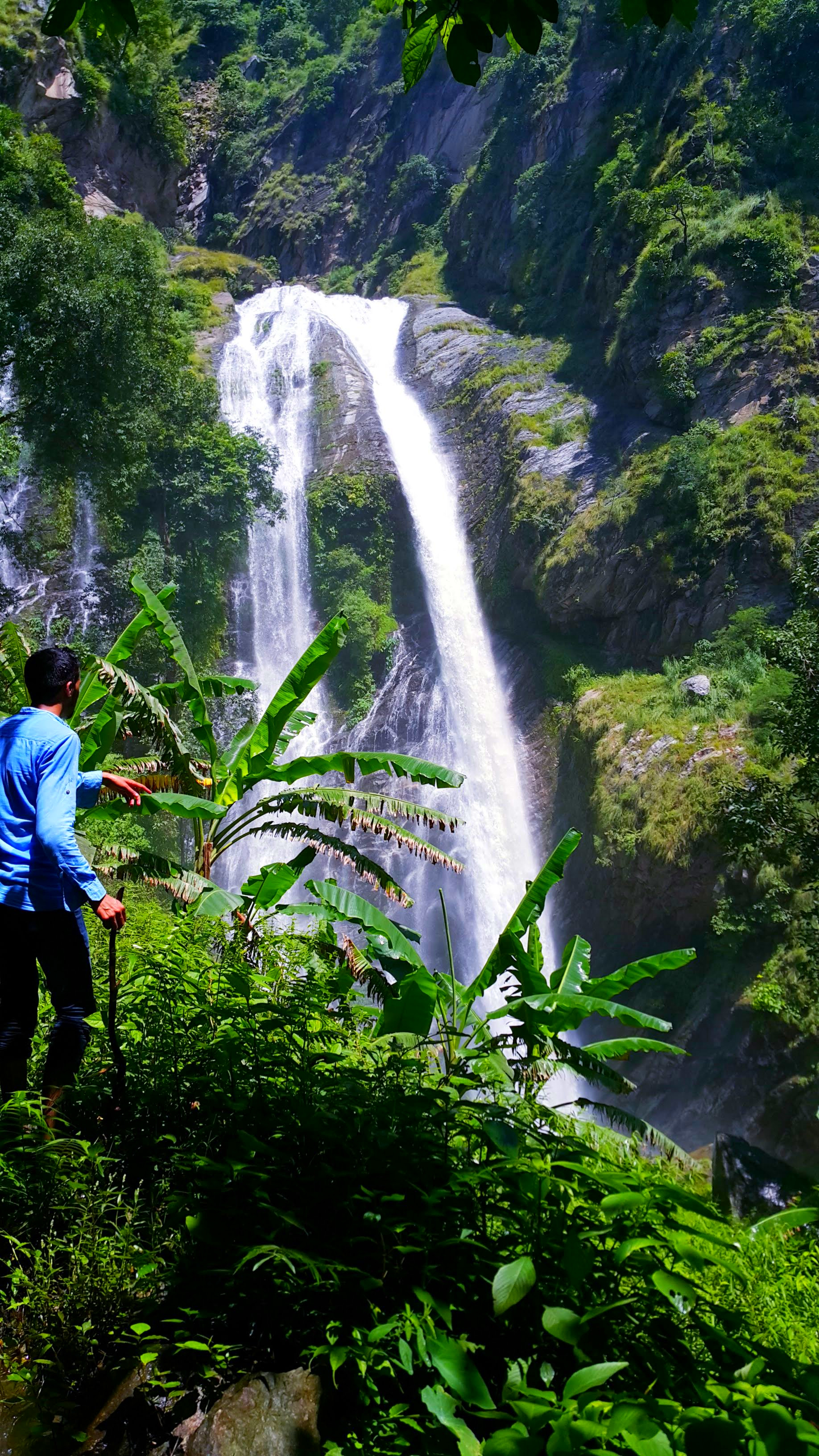
- Rupaligad waterfall

- Location in Nepal
- Coordinates: 29.28°N 80.37°E
- Country: Nepal
- Zone: Mahakali Zone
- District: Dadeldhura District

Population (1991)
  - Total: 4,531
- Time zone: UTC+5:45 (Nepal Time)

Rupal is a village development committee in Dadeldhura District in the Mahakali Zone of western Nepal. At the time of the 1991 Nepal census it had a population of 4531 people living in 779 individual households.

It is also the first place the Champawat Tiger attacked before being driven out of Nepal.
