= Bardibas =

Bardibas बर्दिबास
- Municipality (नगरपालिका)
- Nickname: Bijalpura
- Location within Madhesh Province Location within Nepal
- Coordinates: 26.98°N 85.90°E
- Country: Nepal
- Province: Madhesh Province
- District: Mahottari
- Established: 2 December 2014
- Incorporated (VDC): Bardibas, Gauribas, Kisan Nagar, Maisthan, Hathilet, Pashupatinagar, Khayarmara and Bijalpura
- Incorporated (date): 10 March 2017
- No. of Wards: 14

Government
  - Type: Mayor–council
  - Body: Bardibas Municipality
  - Mayor: Prahlad kaam Chor (Congress)
  - Deputy Mayor: Tara Devi (Congress)

Area
  - Total: 315.57 km^{2} (121.84 sq mi)

Population (2021)
  - Total: 707,994
  - Density: 2,243.5/km^{2} (5,810.7/sq mi)
- Time zone: UTC+05:45 (NPT)
- Telephone Code: 044
- Website: bardibasmun.gov.np

Bardibas (Maithili: बर्दिबास) is a municipal area and a town located in Mahottari District of Nepal that connects the Kathmandu Valley with Madhesh Province and extends the connection to Koshi Province.

== Geography ==
Bardibas is located at the foothills of the Chure range at a location of 26.98°N 85.90°E. It comprises Chure region and Outer Terai. Bardibas Municipality straddles the Chure hill range in the Mahottari district. Ratu river, which originates from Chure hills lies east to Bardibas. It spreads to 18 kilometres (11 mi) east-west and 30 kilometres (19 mi) on north-south along the East-West highway.

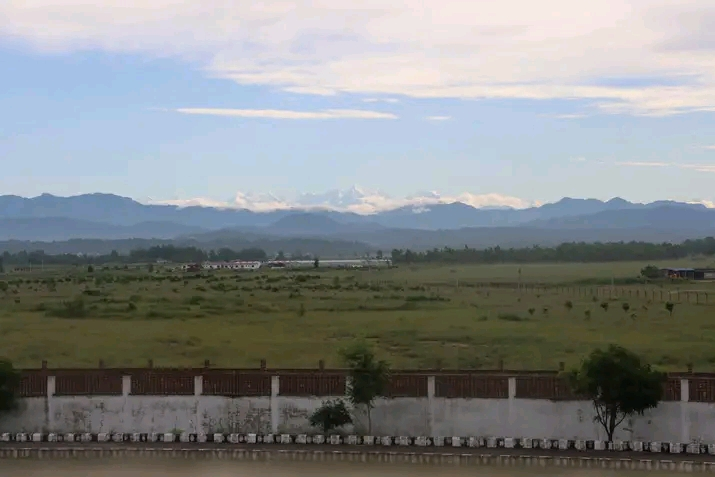
Himal, Pahad & Terai seen from Bardibas

The Chure region of Bardibas Municipality has emerged as a significant location for archaeological research and eco-tourism. Local authorities and conservation committees are actively working in the area to promote tourism while protecting archaeological heritage and vulture populations.

== Demography ==
Total population of the municipality in 2011 Nepal census) had 66354 and total area of the municipality is 315.57 square kilometres (121.84 sq mi). In 2021 census the population of Bardibas increased to 68353. The municipality is divided into total 14 wards.

The municipality was established on 2 December 2014 merging the then four VDCs of Bardibas, Maisthan, Gauribas and Kisan Nagar.

In 2015, when Government of Nepal decided to dissolve the old thousands of VDCs and declare new 753 local level body then four more VDCs were merged with this municipality, those municipalities were: Hathilet, Pashupatinagar, Khayamara and Bijayalpura.

The municipality was established in 2014 merging the old VDCs, so area and population of the municipality were calculated according to the 2011 Nepal census, as follows:

VDCs	Area	Population (2011)
Bardibas (VDC)	171.19 km^{2} (66.10 sq mi)	12584
Gauribas	171.19 km^{2} (66.10 sq mi)	6321
Kisan Nagar	171.19 km^{2} (66.10 sq mi)	8121
Maisthan	171.19 km^{2} (66.10 sq mi)	20022
Hathilet	27.78 km^{2} (10.73 sq mi)	5316
Pashupatinagar	7.46 km^{2} (2.88 sq mi)	4941
KhayaMara	93.12 km^{2} (35.95 sq mi)	8719
Bijayalpura	11.91 km^{2} (4.60 sq mi)	8188
Bardibas (Municipality)	315.57 km^{2} (121.84 sq mi)	76354

== Culture and heritage ==
Bardibas and the surrounding Mahottari district are deeply rooted in the Mithila culture.

-Traditional Arts: The region is famous for Mithila (Maithili) art, where women traditionally decorate the walls and floors of their homes (known as Bhittichitra and Aripan) with colorful paintings. These artworks often depict religious epics like the Ramayana and Mahabharata, nature, and social messages.

-Festivals: Major festivals celebrated include Chhath Puja, Vivah Panchami, Dashain, Tihar, Holi, and Eid, reflecting the district's religious and cultural diversity.

Crafts: Local traditions include Sikki handicrafts, which involve weaving golden grass into decorative baskets and ornaments.

== Education ==
- Bardibas Janata Multiple Campus
- College of Natural Resource Management (CNRM), Bardibas
- Nepal Academy of Tourism and Hotel Management (NATHM Bardibas), Bardibas
- Nirmal Lama Polytechnic Institute, Bardibas
- Rara Technical Institute, Bardibas
- Maisthan Public Academy, Maisthan
- Bardibas Boarding School,Bardibas-1
- Sainik Awasiya Mahavidyalaya, Bardibas
- Deurali Secondary School, Bardibas
- Janata Secondary School, Bardibas
- Global Academy Secondary School,Bardibas
- Central Point Secondary Academy School,Bardibas

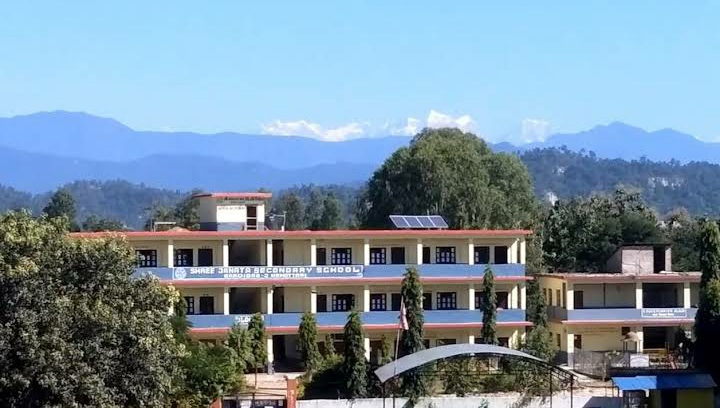
Janata Secondary School, Gauridanda, Bardibas

== Media ==
The local media of Bardibas primarily consists of several community radio stations such as Radio Nepal Bardibas 103 MHz, Radio Bardibas 94 MHz, Radio Sungava 104.6 MHz and Radio Darpan 88.4 MHz, some print newspapers and online newsportals.

== Health ==
- Bardibas Hospital
- Bardibas Jansewa Hospital
- Pinnacle Hospital
- Field Hospital, Bardibas
- Bardibas Medical College (Proposed)

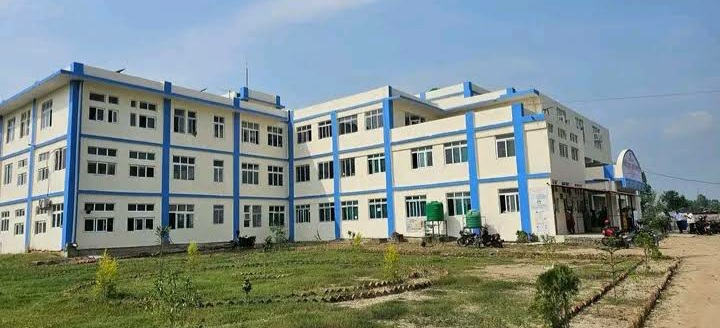
Bardibas Hospital

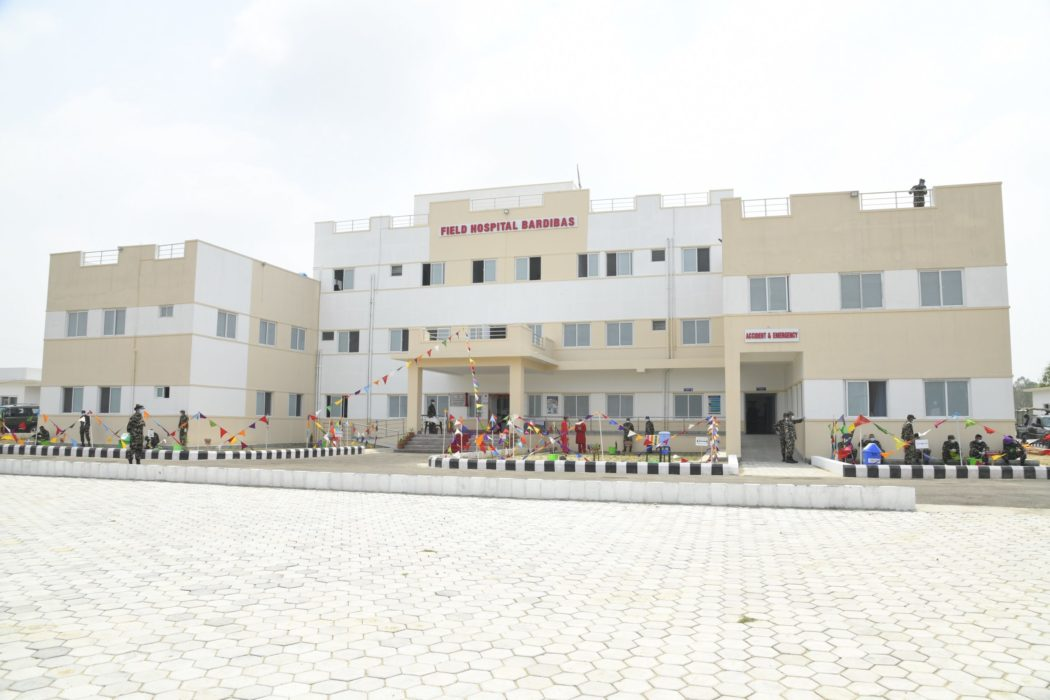
Field Hospital in Bardibas

== Transportation ==
Bardibas serves as a junction point of the east-west Mahendra Highway and BP Highway. The BP Highway connects Bardibas with the capital city Kathmandu through Sindhuli, Khurkot, Nepalthok and Dhulikhel.

Municipality Transport Master Plan (MTMP), Bardibas is prepared for assessing and planning the present road and transport infrastructures and facilities within the Municipality and its surrounding.In total there are roads of length 456.95 km (283.94 mi) within the Municipality including feeder roads and National Highway, either in planned or existing condition.

It has a charging station for EV transport as well. Indo-Nepal crossborder railway namely Bardibas-Jaynagar Railway connecting Jaynagar to Bardibas is underconstruction. Similarly, Bardibas-Simara Railway is being constructed as the part of East-West Mechi Mahakali Railway. The nearest airport, Janakpur airport is 37 km (23 mi) away lying southeast from Bardibas. Indo-Nepal Border namely Samsi-Kanhawa Border is 27 km (17 mi) in distance to south from Bardibas. Can be a sub metropolitan city in near future.

== See also ==
- Jaynagar–Bardibas railway line
- Dhalkebar
- Lalbandi
- Itahari
