= Mangaltar, Kavrepalanchok =

Mangaltar मंगलटार
- Village development committee
- Location in Nepal
- Coordinates: 27.47°N 85.74°E
- Country: Nepal
- Zone: Bagmati Zone
- District: Kabhrepalanchok District

Population (1991)
  - Total: 3,533
- Time zone: UTC+5:45 (Nepal Time)
- Postal code: 45202
- Area code: 011

Mangaltar is a village development committee in Kabhrepalanchok District in the Bagmati Zone of central Nepal. At the time of the 1991 Nepal census it had a population of 3,533 in 564 individual households.
