= Shantinagar, Jhapa =

Shantinagar शान्तिनगर
- Village development committee
- Location in Nepal
- Coordinates: 26.74°N 88.09°E
- Country: Nepal
- Province: Province No. 1
- District: Jhapa District

Population (1991)
  - Total: 14,105
- Time zone: UTC+5:45 (Nepal Time)

Shantinagar is a village development committee in Jhapa District in the Province No. 1 of south-eastern Nepal. At the time of the 1991 Nepal census it had a population of 14,105 people living in 2837 individual households.

In Shantinagar there is a village named Shantapur.
