= Golanjor Rural Municipality =

Golanjor (RM) गोलन्जोर गाउँपालिका
- Rural Municipality
- Location in the Bagmati Province Golanjor (RM) (Nepal)
- Coordinates: 27°16′0″N 86°3′45″E
- Country: Nepal
- Province: Bagmati
- District: Sindhuli
- Wards: 7
- Established: 10 March 2017

Government
  - Type: Rural Council
  - Chairperson: Mr. Pushpa Bahadur Karki
  - Vice-chairperson: Mrs. Ganga Devi Shreshtha

Area
  - Total: 184.13 km^{2} (71.09 sq mi)

Population (2011)
  - Total: 19,329
  - Density: 104.97/km^{2} (271.88/sq mi)
- Time zone: UTC+5:45 (Nepal Standard Time)
- Headquarter: Bhuwaneshwori
- Website: golanjormun.gov.np

Golanjor is a Rural municipality located within the Sindhuli District of the Bagmati Province of Nepal. The municipality spans 184.13 square kilometres (71.09 sq mi) of area, with a total population of 19,329 according to a 2011 Nepal census.

On March 10, 2017, the Government of Nepal restructured the local level bodies into 753 new local level structures. The previous Dudbhanjyang, Bitijor Bagaincha, Bhuwaneshwori, Tinkanya, Ratnachura Bhimeshwar and Baseshwar VDCs were merged to form Golanjor Rural Municipality. Golanjor is divided into 7 wards, with Bhuwaneshwori declared the administrative center of the rural municipality.

== Demographics ==
At the time of the 2011 Nepal census, Golanjor Rural Municipality had a population of 19,490. Of these, 78.1% spoke Nepali, 13.3% Magar, 4.1% Tamang, 1.4% Vayu, 1.1% Majhi, 1.0% Newar, 0.4% Gurung, 0.2% Rai, 0.1% Maithili and 0.1% other languages as their first language.

In terms of ethnicity/caste, 20.7% were Magar, 18.4% Chhetri, 10.8% Sarki, 9.7% Newar, 7.4% Hill Brahmin, 6.6% Tamang, 5.6% Damai/Dholi, 4.2% Gharti/Bhujel, 4.0% Kami, 3.0% Thakuri, 2.7% Majhi, 2.1% Hayu, 2.0% Sunuwar, 0.8% Rai, 0.6% Gurung, 0.5% Sanyasi/Dasnami, 0.3% Sudhi, 0.1% Pahari, 0.1% Teli and 0.3% others.

In terms of religion, 83.9% were Hindu, 14.0% Buddhist, 1.2% Prakriti, 0.6% Christian and 0.2% others.

In terms of literacy, 60.2% could read and write, 4.2% could only read and 35.5% could neither read nor write.
