= Tinpatan Rural Municipality =

Tinpatan (RM) तीनपाटन गाउँपालिका
- Rural Municipality
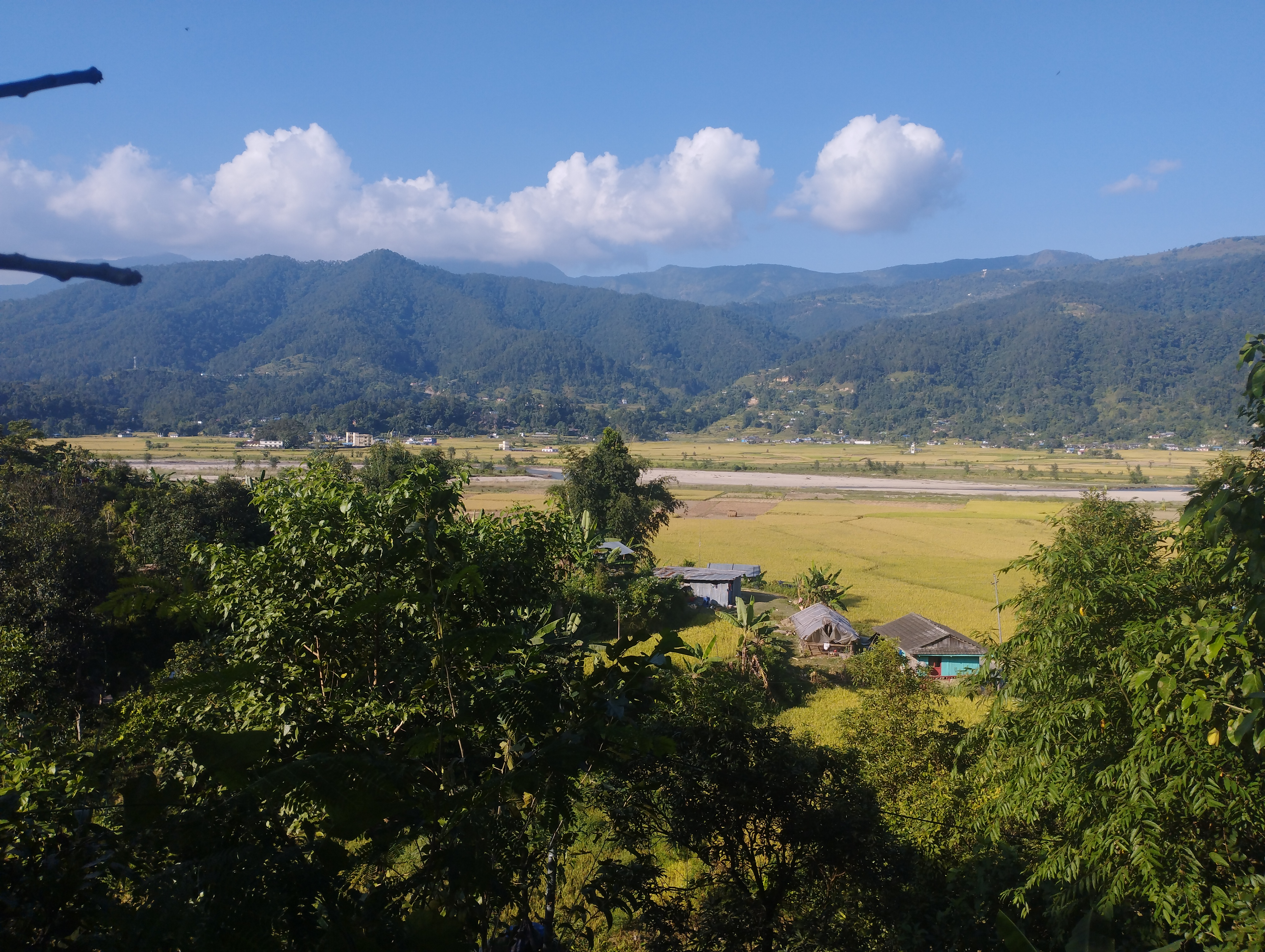

- Location in Bagmati Tinpatan (RM) (Nepal)
- Coordinates: 27°06′31″N 86°09′39″E
- Country: Nepal
- Province: Bagmati
- District: Sindhuli District
- Wards: 11
- Established: 10 March 2017
- Admin H.Q.: Lampantar (Chakmake)

Government
  - Type: Rural Council
  - Chairperson: Karna Bahadur Magar
  - Vice-chairperson: Dhan Bahadur Pulami

Area
  - Total: 280.26 km^{2} (108.21 sq mi)

Population (2021)
  - Total: 34,889
  - Density: 124.49/km^{2} (322.42/sq mi)
- Time zone: UTC+5:45 (Nepal Standard Time)
- Website: tinpatanmun.gov.np

Tinpatan (Nepali: तीनपाटन) is a Rural municipality located within the Sindhuli District of the Bagmati Province of Nepal. The municipality spans 280.26 square kilometres (108.21 sq mi) in area, with a total population of 34,889 according to a 2021 Nepal census.

On 10 March 2017, the Government of Nepal restructured the local level bodies into 753 new local level structures. The previous Balajor, Jarayotar, Lampantar, Tribhuvan Ambote, Tosramkhola, Bahuntilpung, Bhimsthan and Belghari VDCs were merged to form Tinpatan Rural Municipality. Tinpatan is divided into 11 wards, with Lampantar (Chakmake) declared the administrative center of the rural municipality.

== Ward division ==
Tinpatan Rural Municipality is divided into 11 wards. They are as follows:

Current Ward	Previous VDC Wards	Area (km^{2})	Population (2021)
1	Belghari (1-9)	39.12	3,468
2	Bhimsthan (1-5)	21.32	3,531
3	Bhimsthan (6-9)	24.89	2,196
4	Jarayotar (1,4-6)	17.03	3,114
5	Jarayotar (2,3,7-9)	31.57	3,578
6	Balajor (1-9)	34.17	3,953
7	Tosramkhola (1-9)	16.23	1,790
8	Bahuntilpung (1-9)	20.22	3,100
9	Tribhuvan Ambote (1-9)	42.2	3,732
10	Lampantar (1-3)	16.1	2,479
11	Lampantar (4-9)	17.44	3,948

== Demographics ==
At the time of the 2011 Nepal census, Tinpatan Rural Municipality had a population of 36,420. Of these, 45.4% spoke Nepali, 32.6% Magar, 14.3% Tamang, 5.7% Newar, 0.8% Majhi, 0.5% Sunwar, 0.3% Maithili, 0.1% Bhojpuri, 0.1% Rai and 0.1% other languages as their first language.

In terms of ethnicity/caste, 34.2% were Magar, 14.9% Tamang, 10.6% Chhetri, 10.1% Hill Brahmin, 9.3% Newar, 5.7% Sarki, 5.0% Kami, 4.4% Damai/Dholi, 1.5% Gharti/Bhujel, 1.1% Majhi, 0.8% Terai Brahmin, 0.7% Sunuwar, 0.7% Thakuri, 0.4% Sanyasi/Dasnami, 0.1% Hayu, 0.1% Rai, 0.1% Sonar and 0.2% others.

In terms of religion, 73.4% were Hindu, 25.9% Buddhist, 0.4% Christian, 0.1% Kirati and 0.1% others.

In terms of literacy, 65.0% could read and write, 2.8% could only read and 32.1% could neither read nor write.
