= Phikkal Rural Municipality =

Phikkal Gaupalika फिक्कल गाउँपालिका Phikkal
- Rural Municipality
- Phikkal Rural Municipality
- Interactive map of Phikkal Gaupalika
- Coordinates: 27°14′37″N 86°17′04″E
- Country: Nepal
- Province: Bagmati
- District: Sindhuli District
- Wards: 6
- Established: 10 March 2017

Government
  - Type: Local Level Government
  - Chairperson: Mrs. Parbati Sunuwar
  - Vice-Chairperson: Mr. Raju Baral
  - Term of office: (2021 - 2026)

Area
  - Total: 186.06 km^{2} (71.84 sq mi)

Population (2022)Phikka Rural Municipality
  - Total: 15,910
  - Density: 85.51/km^{2} (221.5/sq mi)
- Time zone: UTC+5:45 (Nepal Standard Time)
- Postal Code: 45901
- Area code: 047
- Headquarter: Khang Sang
- Website: phikkalmun.gov.np
- Chairmenship and vice-chairmanship is led by CPN UML political party.

Phikkal is a Rural municipality located within the Sindhuli District of the Bagmati Province of Nepal. The municipality spans 186.06 square kilometres (71.84 sq mi) of area, with a total population of 15,910 according to a 2021 Nepal census.

On March 10, 2017, the Government of Nepal restructured the local level bodies into 753 new local level structures. The previous Mahadevdada, Sunam Pokhari, Kholagaun, Khang Sang, Solpathana and Ratnawati VDCs were merged to form Phikkal Rural Municipality. Phikkal is divided into 6 wards, with Khang Sang declared the administrative center of the rural municipality.

== Demographics ==
At the time of the 2011 Nepal census, Phikkal Rural Municipality had a population of 16,968. Of these, 58.7% spoke Nepali, 17.1% Magar, 10.9% Sunwar, 4.7% Wambule, 4.6% Tamang, 2.6% Newar, 0.5% Majhi, 0.3% Jerung, 0.3% Maithili, 0.2% Rai and 0.1% other languages as their first language.

In terms of ethnicity/caste, 20.9% were Magar, 15.9% Sunuwar, 12.6% Chhetri, 11.6% Hill Brahmin, 8.4% Kami, 5.4% Sarki, 5.2% Rai, 5.1% Tamang, 5.0% Newar, 4.6% Damai/Dholi, 2.1% Gharti/Bhujel, 1.5% Majhi, 0.5% Terai Brahmin, 0.5% Sanyasi/Dasnami, 0.3% Sonar and 0.4% others.

In terms of religion, 88.0% were Hindu, 6.6% Buddhist, 4.8% Kirati, 0.1% Christian and 0.3% others.

In terms of literacy, 58.6% could read and write, 3.7% could only read and 37.6% could neither read nor write.
