= Sunkoshi Rural Municipality, Sindhuli =

Sunkoshi Gaunpalika सुनकोशी गाउँपालिका
- Rural Municipality
- Location in Nepal
- Coordinates: 27°22′30″N 85°53′30″E
- Province: Bagmati Province
- District: Sindhuli
- Established: 10 March 2017

Government
  - Type: Village council
  - Chairperson: Dipa Bohora (Dahal)
  - Vice chairperson: Dirwasi Moktan

Area
  - Total: 154.68 km^{2} (59.72 sq mi)

Population (2011)
  - Total: 21,473
  - Density: 138.82/km^{2} (359.55/sq mi)
- Time zone: UTC+5:45 (Nepal Standard Time)
- Headquarter: Jhangajholi Ratmata
- Website: official website

Sunkoshi Rural Municipality (Nepali: सुनकोशी गाउँपालिका) is a rural municipality in Sindhuli district of Bagmati Province in Nepal. The Rural municipality is divided into 7 wards. According to 2011 Nepal census, the total population of the municipality is 21,473 with 4,557 households. The total area of the municipality is 158.68 square kilometres (61.27 mi^{2}) The headquarter of the municipality is at Jhangajholi Ratmata.

The rural municipality was established on March 10, 2017, when Ministry of Federal Affairs and Local Development dissolved the existing village development committees and announced the establishment of this new local body.

Kusheshwar Dumja, Jhangjholi Ratmata, Purano Jhangajholi, Sitalpati and Majhuwa VDCs were merged to form the new rural municipality.

== Demographics ==
At the time of the 2011 Nepal census, Sunkoshi Rural Municipality had a population of 21,969. Of these, 77.9% spoke Nepali, 18.4% Tamang, 1.6% Newar, 0.7% Magar, 0.5% Vayu, 0.4% Sunwar, 0.1% Maithili, 0.1% Majhi and 0.1% other languages as their first language.

In terms of ethnicity/caste, 18.8% were Chhetri, 18.7% Tamang, 13.3% Magar, 10.9% Hill Brahmin, 10.9% Newar, 8.6% Sarki, 4.8% Damai/Dholi, 4.0% Kami, 3.5% Gharti/Bhujel, 2.0% Majhi, 1.6% Sanyasi/Dasnami, 1.3% Hayu, 0.6% Sunuwar, 0.4% Thakuri, 0.3% Rai and 0.2% others.

In terms of religion, 79.5% were Hindu, 18.6% Buddhist, 1.0% Prakriti, 0.7% Christian, 0.1% Muslim and 0.1% others.

In terms of literacy, 58.9% could read and write, 4.0% could only read and 37.0% could neither read nor write.

== See also ==
- Bagmati Province
