= Marin Rural Municipality =

Marin (RM) मरिण गाउँपालिका
- Rural Municipality
- Location Marin (RM) (Nepal)
- Coordinates: 27°15′52″N 85°43′59″E
- Country: Nepal
- Province: Bagmati
- District: Sindhuli District
- Wards: 7
- Established: 10 March 2017

Government
  - Type: Rural Council
  - Chairperson: Mr. Bimarsa Moktan
  - Vice-chairperson: Mrs. Bimala Majhi
  - Term of office: (2017 – 2022)

Area
  - Total: 324.55 km^{2} (125.31 sq mi)

Population (2011)
  - Total: 27,822
  - Density: 85.725/km^{2} (222.03/sq mi)
- Time zone: UTC+5:45 (Nepal Standard Time)
- Headquarter: Kapilakot
- Website: marinmun.gov.np

Marin is a Rural municipality located within the Sindhuli District of the Bagmati Province of Nepal. The municipality spans 324.55 square kilometres (125.31 sq mi) of area, with a total population of 27,822 according to a 2011 Nepal census.

On March 10, 2017, the Government of Nepal restructured the local level bodies into 753 new local level structures. The previous Mahadevasthan, Kalpabrishykha and Kapilakot VDCs were merged to form Marin Rural Municipality. Marin is divided into 8 wards, with Kapilakot declared the administrative center of the rural municipality.

== Demographics ==
At the time of the 2011 Nepal census, Marin Rural Municipality had a population of 27,822. Of these, 56.1% spoke Tamang, 19.2% Nepali, 11.5% Magar, 8.5% Majhi, 1.8% Newar, 0.7% Thangmi, 0.3% Maithili, 0.2% Sunwar, 0.1% Vayu, 0.1% Sign language and 0.1% other languages as their first language.

In terms of ethnicity/caste, 56.1% were Tamang, 14.1% Majhi, 12.5% Magar, 4.3% Chhetri, 4.0% Kami, 2.8% Newar, 1.6% Hill Brahmin, 1.6% Damai/Dholi, 0.7% Thami, 0.6% Sanyasi/Dasnami, 0.5% Sarki, 0.4% Gharti/Bhujel, 0.2% Sunuwar, 0.1% Hayu, 0.1% Sonar and 0.3% others.

In terms of religion, 63.4% were Buddhist, 25.9% Hindu, 9.9% Prakriti, 0.3% Christian and 0.4% others.

In terms of literacy, 54.4% could read and write, 2.8% could only read and 42.6% could neither read nor write.
