= Ghyanglekh Rural Municipality =

Ghyanglekh (RM) घ्याङलेख गाउँपालिका
- Rural Municipality
- Location Ghyanglekh (RM) (Nepal)
- Coordinates: 27°21′0″N 85°48′45″E
- Country: Nepal
- Province: Bagmati
- District: Sindhuli District
- Wards: 5
- Established: 10 March 2017

Government
  - Type: Rural Council
  - Chairperson: Mr. Jagat B. Bholan
  - Vice-chairperson: Mrs. Durga Devi Sunuwar
  - Term of office: (2017 - 2022)

Area
  - Total: 166.77 km^{2} (64.39 sq mi)

Population (2011)
  - Total: 13,661
  - Density: 81.915/km^{2} (212.16/sq mi)
- Time zone: UTC+5:45 (Nepal Standard Time)
- Headquarter: Bastipur
- Website: ghyanglekhmun.gov.np

Ghyanglekh is a Rural municipality located within the Sindhuli District of the Bagmati Province of Nepal. The municipality spans 166.77 square kilometres (64.39 sq mi) of area, with a total population of 13,661 according to a 2011 Nepal census.

On March 10, 2017, the Government of Nepal restructured the local level bodies into 753 new local level structures. The previous Amale, Bastipur, Tamajor, Netrakali and Shanteshwari VDCs were merged to form Ghyanglekh Rural Municipality. Ghyanglekh is divided into 5 wards, with Bastipur declared the administrative center of the rural municipality.

== Demographics ==
At the time of the 2011 Nepal census, Ghyanglekh Rural Municipality had a population of 13,761. Of these, 73.9% spoke Tamang, 9.9% Nepali, 6.8% Magar, 4.2% Newar, 2.4% Thangmi, 2.3% Sunwar, 0.3% Urdu, 0.1% Maithili and 0.1% other languages as their first language.

In terms of ethnicity/caste, 73.9% were Tamang, 7.1% Magar, 5.8% Newar, 3.3% Kami, 3.0% Chhetri, 2.4% Sunuwar, 2.4% Thami, 0.6% Hill Brahmin, 0.6% Damai/Dholi, 0.3% Musalman, 0.1% other Dalit, 0.1% Gharti/Bhujel, 0.1% Sarki and 0.2% others.

In terms of religion, 77.5% were Buddhist, 20.3% Hindu, 1.1% Christian, 0.9% Prakriti and 0.3% Muslim.

In terms of literacy, 49.1% could read and write, 5.5% could only read and 45.4% could neither read nor write.
