= Lekh Nath Dahal =

Nepali politician

- लेख नाथ दाहाल

Member of Parliament, Pratinidhi Sabha
- In office 24 December 2022 – 12 September 2025
- Preceded by: Haribol Gajurel
- Succeeded by: Aashish Gajurel
- Constituency: Sindhuli 2

Personal details
- Born: 23 June 1976 (age 49) Sindhuli District
- Party: CPN (Maoist Centre)

Lekh Nath Dahal is a Nepalese politician, belonging to the Communist Party of Nepal (Maoist Centre) currently serving as a member of the 2nd Federal Parliament of Nepal. In the 2022 Nepalese general election, he was elected from the Sindhuli 2 (constituency).
