= Sindhuli 2 =

Parliamentary constituency in Nepal

- Parliamentary constituency
- Sindhuli 2 in Bagmati Province
- Province: Bagmati Province
- District: Sindhuli District

Current constituency
- Created: 1991
- Party: Rastriya Swatantra Party
- Member of Parliament: Aashish Gajurel

Sindhuli 2 is one of two parliamentary constituencies of Sindhuli District in Nepal. This constituency came into existence on the Constituency Delimitation Commission (CDC) report submitted on 31 August 2017.

== Incorporated areas ==
Sindhuli 2 parliamentary constituency incorporates Hariharpurigadhi Rural Municipality, Marin Rural Municipality, Ghanglekh Rural Municipality, Sunkoshi Rural Municipality and wards 1–8 and 10–12 of Kamalamai Municipality.

== Assembly segments ==
It encompasses the following Bagmati Provincial Assembly segment

- Sindhuli 2(A)
- Sindhuli 2(B)

== Members of Parliament ==
=== Parliament/Constituent Assembly ===
Election	Member	Party
1991	Bipin Koirala	Nepali Congress
1994	Hem Raj Dahal	Nepali Congress
1999	Madan Dhungel	CPN (Unified Marxist–Leninist)
2008	Chandra Prasad Gajurel	CPN (Maoist)
January 2009	Chandra Prasad Gajurel	UCPN (Maoist)
2013	Mohan Prasad Baral	Nepali Congress
2017	Haribol Prasad Gajurel	CPN (Maoist Centre)
May 2018	Haribol Prasad Gajurel	Nepal Communist Party
March 2021	Haribol Prasad Gajurel	CPN (Maoist Centre)
2022	Lekhnath Dahal	CPN (Maoist Centre)
2026	Aashish Gajurel	Rastriya Swatantra Party

=== Provincial Assembly ===
==== 2(A) ====
Election	Member	Party
2017	Binod Kumar Khadka.	CPN (Unified Marxist–Leninist)
May 2018	Binod Kumar Khadka.	Nepal Communist Party

==== 2(B) ====
Election	Member	Party
2017	Buddhi Man Majhi	CPN (Maoist Centre)
May 2018	Buddhi Man Majhi	Nepal Communist Party

== Election results ==
=== Election in the 2020s ===
==== 2022 general election ====
Candidate	Party	Votes	%
Lekhnath Dahal	CPN (Maoist Centre)	27,517	51.44
Manoj Jung Thapa	CPN (UML)	21,687	40.54
Anoj Kumar Dahal	Rastriya Swatantra Party	1,553	2.90
Bisma Raj Shrestha	Rastriya Prajatantra Party	1,340	2.51
Others		1,394	2.61
Total		53,491	100.00
Majority		5,830	
CPN (Maoist Centre) hold			

=== Election in the 2010s ===
==== 2017 legislative elections ====
Party	Candidate	Votes
CPN (Maoist Centre)	Haribol Prasad Gajurel	30,179
Nepali Congress	Narendra Jang Thapa	18,127
CPN (Marxist–Leninist)	Bhakta Lal Shrestha	1,272
Others		1,679
Invalid votes		3,198
Result	Maoist Centre gain	
Source: Election Commission

==== 2017 Nepalese provincial elections ====
===== Sindhuli 2(A) =====
Party	Candidate	Votes
CPN (Unified Marxist–Leninist)	Binod Kumar Khadka	17,366
Nepali Congress	Manik Kumar Dhakal	9,858
Others		1,560
Invalid votes		1,435
Result	CPN (UML) gain	
Source: Election Commission

===== Sindhuli 2(B) =====
Party	Candidate	Votes
CPN (Maoist Centre)	Buddhi Man Majhi	13,749
Nepali Congress	Chhetra Bahadur Bomjan	8,523
Others		705
Invalid votes		1,231
Result	Maoist Centre gain	
Source: Election Commission

==== 2013 Constituent Assembly election ====
Party	Candidate	Votes
Nepali Congress	Mohan Prasad Baral	13,905
UCPN (Maoist)	Ganga Narayan Shrestha	12,372
CPN (Unified Marxist–Leninist)	Uma Devi Koirala	9,080
Rastriya Prajatantra Party	Bhisma Raj Shrestha	1,162
CPN (Marxist–Leninist)	Surotam Prasad Adhikari	1,034
Others		1,518
Result	Congress gain	
Source: NepalNews

=== Election in the 2000s ===
==== 2008 Constituent Assembly election ====
Party	Candidate	Votes
CPN (Maoist)	Chandra Prasad Gajurel	18,398
CPN (Unified Marxist–Leninist)	Keshav Prasad Devkota	10,760
Nepali Congress	Ujjwal Prasad Baral	10,401
Others		2,834
Invalid votes		2,024
Result	Maoist gain	
Source: Election Commission

=== Election in the 1990s ===
==== 1999 legislative elections ====
Party	Candidate	Votes
CPN (Unified Marxist–Leninist)	Shankar Nath Sharma Adhikari	14,142
Nepali Congress	Ujjwal Prasad Baral	13,103
CPN (Marxist–Leninist)	Shanti Man Karki	3,784
Others		2,355
Invalid Votes		125
Result	CPN (UML) gain	
Source: Election Commission

==== 1994 legislative elections ====
Party	Candidate	Votes
Nepali Congress	Hem Raj Dahal	10,471
CPN (Unified Marxist–Leninist)	Goma Devkota	9,027
Rastriya Prajatantra Party	Mohan Bikram Thapa	5,901
CPN (Marxist)	Bishwambhar Lamichanne	2,651
Others		868
Result	Congress hold	
Source: Election Commission

==== 1991 legislative elections ====
Party	Candidate	Votes
Nepali Congress	Prakash Koirala	9,800
CPN (Unified Marxist–Leninist)	Goma Devkota	6,714
Result	Congress gain	

== See also ==
- List of parliamentary constituencies of Nepal
