= Dudhauli =

Dudhauli दुधौली
- Municipality
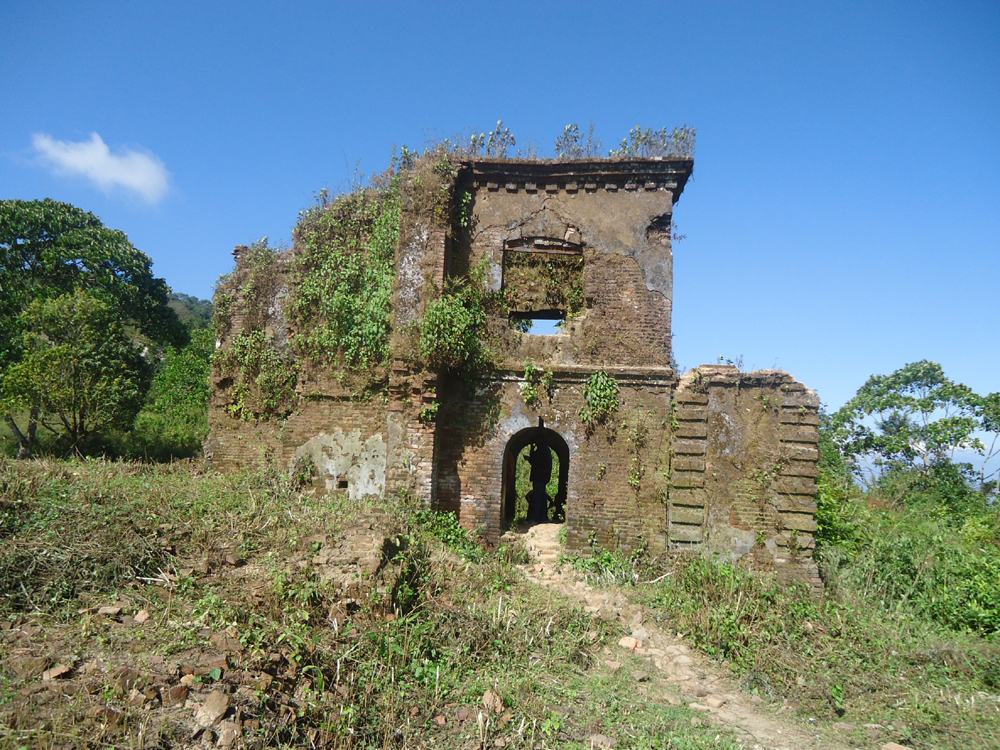

- Location in Nepal
- Coordinates: 26°58′10″N 86°16′15″E
- Country: Nepal
- Province: Bagmati
- District: Sindhuli
- No. of Wards: 14
- Established: 2 December 2014

Government
  - Mayor: Dinesh Adhikari
  - Deputy Mayor: ChandraKishor Tharu (NC)

Area
  - Total: 390.39 km^{2} (150.73 sq mi)

Population (2021)
  - Total: 70,207
  - Density: 179.84/km^{2} (465.78/sq mi)
- Time zone: UTC+5:45 (NST)
- Website: http://dudhaulimun.gov.np

Dudhauli (Nepali: दुधौली) is a municipality of the Sindhuli District in the Bagmati Province of Nepal. It has a total area of 390.39 km^{2}. According to 2021 census, it has a total population of 70,207.

The municipality was established on 2 December 2014 and further expanded on 10 March 2017.

== Organization ==
It was a village development committee but later changed to a Municipality. It merged Dudhauli VDC, Ladabhir VDC, and Tandi VDC and later Sirthouli, Hatpate, Harsai, Nipane, Arunthakur, Kakurthakur and Jinakhu VDCs.

Dudhauli Bazar, Sankhatar, Dadatol, Khiriyani, Kartha, Bataha, Arunthakur, Kakurthakur, Hatpate, Nipane, Harsai, Dakaha, Sirthauli, Maini, Tandi etc. are the main villages of Dudhauli.

== Ward division ==
During the time of incorporation in 2014, Dudhauli Municipality was divided in 11 wards. After the expansion in 2017, the municipality was reorganized into 14 wards.

Current Ward	Previous Municipality / VDC Wards	Area (km^{2})	Population (2021)
1	Hatpate (1,7-9)	24.07	4,356
2	Hatpate (2–6)	28.76	4,032
3	Nipane (1–9)	18.98	3,742
4	Sirthauli (1–5)	21.46	4,620
5	Sirthauli (6–9)	26.61	4,164
6	Harsahi (1–9)	23.38	5,737
7	Dudhauli (1,2)	13.61	4,318
8	Dudhauli (3,4)	16.42	3,463
9	Dudhauli (5,6)	10.03	6,681
10	Dudhauli (7,8)	19.84	6,425
11	Dudhauli (9–11)	29.17	7,500
12	Jinakhu (1–9)	41.81	4,206
13	Arun Thakur (1–9)	48.19	5,707
14	Kakur Thakur (1–9)	38.06	5,249

The previous 11 wards of Dudhauli Municipality and their constituent VDC wards are as follows:

Previous Wards	Previous VDC Wards
1	Ladabhir (1,2)
2	Ladabhir (3,4)
3	Ladabhir (5,6)
4	Ladabhir (7–9)
5	Dudhauli (6–8)
6	Dudhauli (4,5,9)
7	Dudhauli (1–3)
8	Tandi (8,9)
9	Tandi (1,4,7)
10	Tandi (2,3)
11	Tandi (5,6)

== Infrastructure ==
- Central police training center Kogati
- Maini Mela
- Major parts of Alternative Highway
- Dudhauli Bazar
- Ladavir school
- Kamala multiple campus
- Kamala H.S. School, Maini

== Demographics ==
At the time of the 2011 Nepal census it had a population of 65,302 living in more than 4,000 households. It has in total 14 wards.

46.1% of the population spoke Nepali, 20.1% Danwar, 13.5% Tamang, 9.2% Magar, 4.9% Maithili, 2.6% Sunwar, 1.1% Newar, 1.0% Majhi, 0.8% Rai, 0.1% Gurung, 0.1% Thangmi, 0.1% Tharu and 0.1% other languages as their first language.

In terms of ethnicity/caste, 20.4% were Danuwar, 17.8% Chhetri, 14.2% Tamang, 10.5% Magar, 9.3% Hill Brahmin, 5.4% Sunuwar, 4.6% Kami, 2.8% Damai/Dholi, 2.8% Musahar, 2.4% Majhi, 2.3% Newar, 1.4% Sarki, 1.0% Rai, 0.9% Sudhi, 0.7% Gharti/Bhujel, 0.7% Thakuri, 0.4% Sanyasi/Dasnami, 0.3% Gurung, 0.3% Teli, 0.3% Thami, 0.2% Kalwar, 0.1% Terai Brahmin, 0.1% Dhanuk, 0.1% Dom, 0.1% Hajjam/Thakur, 0.1% Halwai, 0.1% Kayastha, 0.1% Musalman, 0.1% other Terai, 0.1% Tharu, 0.1% Yadav and 0.2% others.

In terms of religion, 76.1% were Hindu, 16.4% Buddhist, 5.9% Prakriti, 0.6% Christian, 0.2% Kirati, 0.1% Muslim and 0.8% others.

In terms of literacy, 58.3% could read and write, 3.3% could only read and 38.2% could neither read nor write.

The population of the municipality rose to 70,207 at the 2021 Nepal census. 100% of the residents were Nepali citizens and 70.7% were literate in 2021.

== Economy ==
It has substantial resources such as productive soil, calcium (a raw material for cement), water and forests. After the formation of the municipality, the development of physical infrastructure and social development activities is increasing.

== Problems Here ==
- Higher level of illiteracy, it means Lack of proper and quality of education to people. No Good higher education, no technical education facilities, Highest level of school dropouts by the lower level families' children due to their family problems and illiteracy. - No good Roads are here, access and connectivity to big cities are much poorer. Due to many rivers here much Bridges are needed. - No Hospital with Health facilities, too poor status. - Poor condition of farmers, Lack of irrigation to lands, No cashcrops production. - Unemployment - No factories, Businesses, and Entrepreneurship development . - Low development of infrastructures. - lower level of economic and social development of People inside here .
