= Hariharpurgadhi Rural Municipality =

Hariharpur Gadhi हरिहरपुर गढी
- Gaunpalika
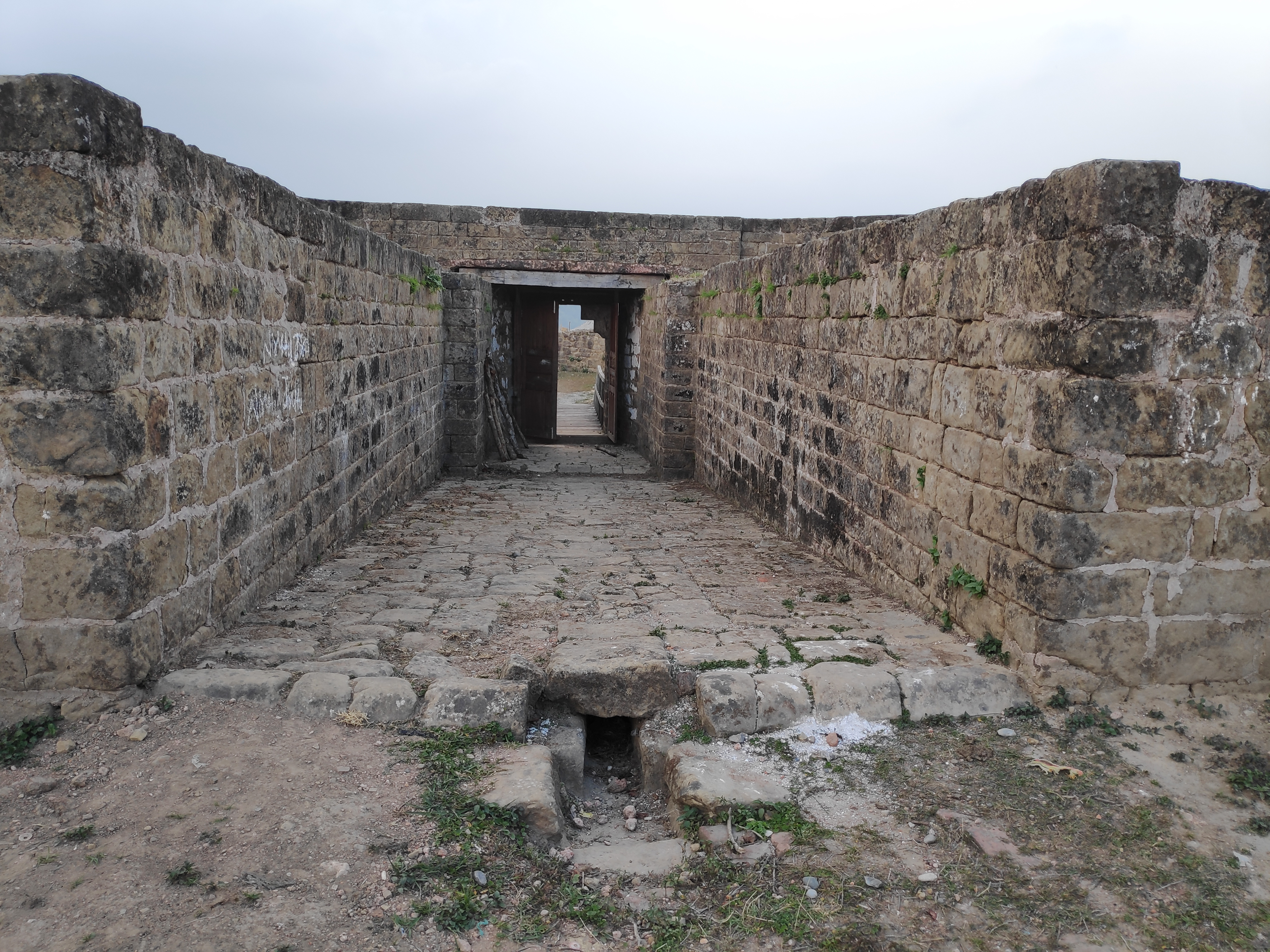
- Gate of Hariharpur Gadhi Darbar

- Location in Nepal
- Coordinates: 27°19′0″N 85°29′0″E
- Country: Nepal
- Province: Bagmati Province
- District: Sindhuli District

Population (1991)
  - Total: 3,113
- Time zone: UTC+5:45 (Nepal Time)
- Website: hariharpurgadhimun.gov.np

Hariharpur Gadhi is a Gaunpalika and former village development committee in Sindhuli District in Bagmati Province of central Nepal. At the time of the 1991 Nepal census it had a population of 3,113 people living in 437 individual households.

== Demographics ==
At the time of the 2011 Nepal census, Hariharpurgadhi Rural Municipality had a population of 27,727. Of these, 66.6% spoke Tamang, 13.5% Nepali, 9.0% Danwar, 3.8% Magar, 2.9% Rai, 2.7% Majhi, 0.6% Newar, 0.3% Pahari, 0.2% Sign language, 0.1% Bhojpuri, 0.1% Maithili and 0.1% other languages as their first language.

In terms of ethnicity/caste, 67.0% were Tamang, 9.1% Danuwar, 6.5% Magar, 3.7% Kami, 3.2% Majhi, 3.0% Rai, 2.5% Pahari, 1.1% Chhetri, 1.0% Newar, 0.9% Hill Brahmin, 0.8% Damai/Dholi, 0.2% Ghale, 0.2% Gharti/Bhujel, 0.2% Sarki, 0.1% Badi, 0.1% other Dalit and 0.3% others.

In terms of religion, 68.8% were Buddhist, 23.6% Hindu, 5.4% Prakriti, 1.9% Christian and 0.4% others.

In terms of literacy, 50.6% could read and write, 3.6% could only read and 45.8% could neither read nor write.
