= Pursotam Pokhrel =

Nepali karateka

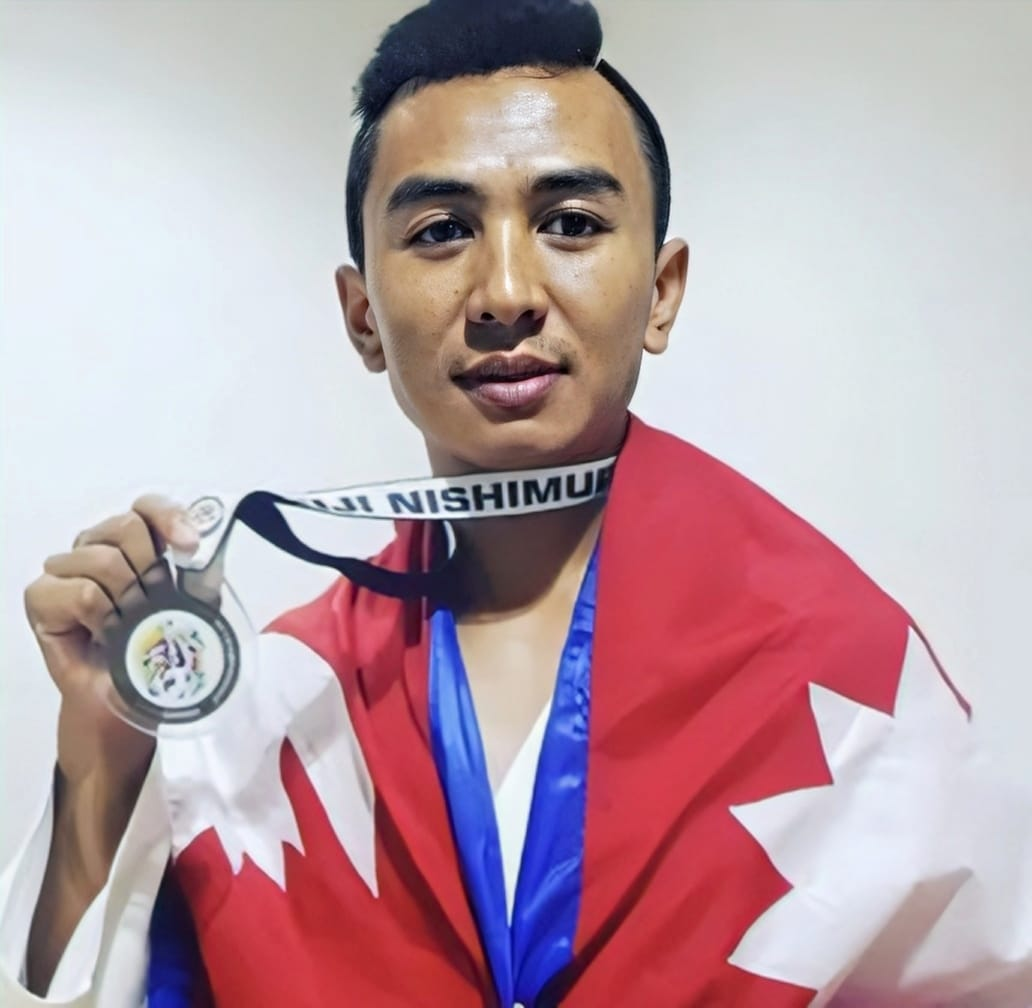
- Born: April 28, 1991 (age 35); Bhimeshwar-4, Sindhuli District, Nepal
- Nationality: Nepali
- Style: Wado Ryu Karate
- Team: Nepal Karate (coach)
- Rank: 4th Dan (Wado Ryu)

Other information
- Occupation: Karate instructor, coach, referee
- Notable club: Saraswati Dojo

Pursotam Pokhrel (born 28 April 1991) is a Nepali karateka, instructor, national coach, and referee. He holds a 4th Dan in Wado Ryu Karate and has served as treasurer of the Nepal Wado Ryu Karate-Do Association. He is the chief instructor at Saraswati Dojo in Gokarneshwar-8, Kathmandu.

== Early life and education ==
Pursotam Pokhrel was born on 28 April 1991 in Bhimeshwar-4, Sindhuli District, Nepal. He began practising karate at a young age and later specialized in Wado Ryu Karate.

== Career ==
Pokhrel has over 20 years of experience in karate as a competitor, instructor, and official. He has served in several roles within the Nepal Wado Ryu Karate-Do Association, including treasurer, and works as the chief instructor at Saraswati Dojo in Gokarneshwar-8, Kathmandu. He is also listed as a national coach for Nepal and serves as a national referee under World Karate Federation (WKF) rules.

== Students ==
Among the athletes he has coached are:

- Elon Shrestha
- Susmita Waiba
- Tika Maya Jimmee
- Prakash Majhi

== Achievements ==
Pokhrel has represented Nepal in international competitions and earned medals at multiple events, including:

- Bronze — 12th Siji Nishimura Cup International Karate Championship (Fukuoka, Japan).
- 2 Bronze Medals — 2nd Kamitsuma Okukai International Karate Championship (Cambodia).
- Silver — 3rd International Karate Championship (Ratanapura, Sri Lanka).
- 2 Gold Medals — 5th & 6th South Asian Wado Ryu Karate Championships (Gujarat, India).

== Instructor roles ==
He is the chief instructor at Saraswati Dojo and teaches at several schools in Kathmandu, including The Celebration Co-ed School, Young Hearts Boarding School, The Himalayan White House World School, and Eastpole Secondary School.

== Contributions ==
Pokhrel has been involved in coaching national athletes, refereeing under WKF rules, organizing local events and seminars, and promoting Wado Ryu Karate in Nepal.
