= Jarayotar =

Jarayotar may refer to:

- Jarayotar, Janakpur
- Jarayotar, Kosi
