= Aashish Gajurel =

Nepalese Politician

- आशिष गजुरेल

Member of Parliament, Pratinidhi Sabha
- Incumbent
- Assumed office 26 March 2026
- Preceded by: Lekh Nath Dahal
- Constituency: Sindhuli 2

Personal details
- Citizenship: Nepalese
- Party: Rastriya Swatantra Party
- Relations: Haribol Gajurel (uncle)
- Education: Technical University of Munich
- Profession: Politician

Aashish Gajurel (Note: Nepali: आशिष गजुरेल) is a Nepalese politician serving as a member of parliament from the Rastriya Swatantra Party. He is the member of the 7th Pratinidhi Sabha elected from Sindhuli 2 constituency in 2026 Nepalese General Election securing 17,940 votes and defeating Lekh Nath Dahal of the Nepali Communist Party. He was a former executive director of the Nepal Intermodal Transport Development Board (NITDB). He holds a I.A Pass Patan College, Tribhuwan University ]. Gajurel is known for riding bicycle to attend the first parliament session at Singha Durbar on April 2, 2026.
