= Phikkal =

Phikkal or Fikkal may refer to the following places in Nepal:

- Phikkal Rural Municipality, in Sindhuli District, Bagmati Province
- Phikkal Bazar, a settlement in Suryodaya Municipality, Koshi Province
