= Pekhu Baghakhor =

Pekhu Bagkhor पेखु बाघखोर is a settlement in Nepal, located between Sorek, Waling and Deuarali. Some parts of the Pekhu Bagkhor DVC are now a part of the municipality of Waling. Pekhu Bagkhor has one primary school, Baal Sikchhya Niketan Prathamic Bidhyalaya, in Gabde. Surkaudi, Amale, Aamdanda, Tallo Pekhu, Mathillo Pekhu are some of the places in within the DVC. People living in Pekhu are called "Pekhule" from around the vicinity.
