= Majuwa =

Majuwa may refer to:

- Majuwa, Ramechhap, Nepal
- Majuwa, Sindhuli, Nepal
