= Harsahi =

Harsahi हर्षाही
- Village development committee
- Location in Nepal
- Coordinates: 26°59′45″N 86°11′15″E
- Country: Nepal
- Zone: Janakpur Zone
- District: Sindhuli District

Population (1991)
  - Total: 3,234
- Time zone: UTC+5:45 (Nepal Time)

Harsahi is a village development committee in Sindhuli District in the Janakpur Zone of south-eastern Nepal. At the time of the 1991 Nepal census it had a population of 3,234 people living in 590 individual households.
