= Hari Parajuli =

Nepali politician

- हरि पराजुली

Minister of Agricultural Development of Nepal
- In office 25 February 2014 – 2 July 2015
- President: Ram Baran Yadav
- Prime Minister: Sushil Koirala
- Vice President: Paramananda Jha
- Succeeded by: Haribol Gajurel

Personal details
- Party: Communist Party of Nepal (Unified Socialist)

Hari Parajuli (Nepali: हरि पराजुली) is a member of Communist Party of Nepal (Unified Socialist), was the Minister of Agricultural Development of Nepal from 25 February 2014 to 2 July 2015 under Sushil Koirala-led government.

== Resignation ==
Parajuli tendered his resignation to Party President K.P. Oli and the Prime Minister Sushil Koirala on 2 July 2015 following the criticism made via media over his alleged indecent behavior with women while participating in paddy plantation in Mulpani at a function of National paddy day on 1 July 2015. Prime Minister Koirala approved his resignation according to the article 38(8) of the Nepal's Interim Constitution, 2007.
