= Bahuntilpung =

Bahuntilpung बाहुनतिल्पुङ
- Village
- Location in Nepal
- Coordinates: 27°9′0″N 86°12′0″E
- Country: Nepal
- Zone: Janakpur Zone
- District: Sindhuli District

Population (1991)
  - Total: 3,007
- Time zone: UTC+5:45 (Nepal Time)

Bahuntilpung is a Village lies in South-eastern Nepal, located in Sindhuli District of the Janakpur Zone . Among 11 wards of Tinpatan Rural Municipality it is ward no. 8. According to the 1991 Nepal census its population is 3,007.
