= Tandi, Sindhuli =

Tandi टाँडी
- Village development committee
- Location in Nepal
- Coordinates: 26°57′0″N 86°15′0″E
- Country: Nepal
- Zone: Janakpur Zone
- District: Sindhuli District

Population (1991)
  - Total: 6,368
- Time zone: UTC+5:45 (Nepal Time)

Tandi is a village development committee in Sindhuli District in the Janakpur Zone of south-eastern Nepal. At the time of the 1991 Nepal census it had a population of 6,368 people living in 1,162 individual households.
