= Kyaneshwar =

Kyaneshwar क्यानेश्वर
- Village development committee
- Location in Nepal
- Coordinates: 27°10′45″N 85°35′0″E
- Country: Nepal
- Zone: Janakpur Zone
- District: Sindhuli District

Population (1991)
  - Total: 8,955
- Time zone: UTC+5:45 (Nepal Time)

Kyaneshwar is a village development committee in Sindhuli District in the Janakpur Zone of south-eastern Nepal. At the time of the 1991 Nepal census it had a population of 8,955 people living in 1,393 individual households.
