= Sirthauli =

Sirthauli सिर्थौली
- Village development committee
- Location in Nepal
- Coordinates: 27°2′0″N 86°11′0″E
- Country: Nepal
- Zone: Janakpur Zone
- District: Sindhuli District

Population (1991)
  - Total: 5,712
- Time zone: UTC+5:45 (Nepal Time)

Sirthauli is a village development committee in Sindhuli District in the Janakpur Zone of south-eastern Nepal. At the time of the 1991 Nepal census it had a population of 5,712 people living in 1,062 individual households.
