= Ladabhir =

Ladabhir लादाभीर
- Village development committee
- Location in Nepal
- Coordinates: 26°59′0″N 86°19′0″E
- Country: Nepal
- Zone: Janakpur Zone
- District: Sindhuli District

Population (1991)
  - Total: 5,937
- Time zone: UTC+5:45 (Nepal Time)

Ladabhir is a village development committee in Sindhuli District in the Janakpur Zone of south-eastern Nepal. At the time of the 1991 Nepal census it had a population of 5,937 people living in 1,135 individual households.
