= Baseshwar =

Basheshwor बसेश्वर
- Village development committee
- Location in Nepal
- Coordinates: 27°17′0″N 86°2′0″E
- Country: Nepal
- Zone: Janakpur Zone
- District: Sindhuli District

Population (1991)
  - Total: 2,980
- Time zone: UTC+5:45 (Nepal Time)

Baseshwar is a village development committee in Sindhuli District in the Janakpur Zone of south-eastern Nepal. At the time of the 1991 Nepal census it had a population of 2,980 people living in 580 individual households.
