= Mahadevsthan, Sindhuli =

Mahadevsthan महादेवस्थान
- Village development committee
- Location in Nepal
- Coordinates: 27°14′0″N 85°46′30″E
- Country: Nepal
- Zone: Janakpur Zone
- District: Sindhuli District

Population (1991)
  - Total: 5,772
- Time zone: UTC+5:45 (Nepal Time)

Mahadevsthan is a village development committee in Sindhuli District in the Janakpur Zone of south-eastern Nepal. At the time of the 1991 Nepal census it had a population of 5,772 people living in 913 individual households.
