= Kalpabrishykha =

Kalpabriksha कल्पवृक्ष
- Village development committee
- Location in Nepal
- Coordinates: 27°13′0″N 85°41′0″E
- Country: Nepal
- Zone: Janakpur Zone
- District: Sindhuli District

Population (1991)
  - Total: 8,849
- Time zone: UTC+5:45 (Nepal Time)

Kalpabriksha is a village development committee in Sindhuli District in the Janakpur Zone of southeastern Nepal. At the time of the 1991 Nepal census, it had a population of 8,849.
