= Purano Jhangajholi =

Purano Jhangajholi पुरानो झाँगाझोली
- Village development committee
- Location in Nepal
- Coordinates: 27°22′30″N 85°53′0″E
- Country: Nepal
- Zone: Janakpur Zone
- District: Sindhuli District

Population (1991)
  - Total: 4,474
- Time zone: UTC+5:45 (Nepal Time)

Purano Jhangajholi is a village development committee in Sindhuli District in the Janakpur Zone of south-eastern Nepal. At the time of the 1991 Nepal census, it had a population of 4,474 people living in 816 individual households. The village is notable for a highway reportedly among Asia's most dangerous; small mirrors cover its retaining wall to draw on Seti Devi Mata, a deity, to prevent accidents.
