= Kusheshwar Dumja =

Kusheshwar Dumja कुशेश्वर दुम्जा
- Village development committee
- Location in Nepal
- Coordinates: 27°24′0″N 85°48′45″E
- Country: Nepal
- Zone: Janakpur Zone
- District: Sindhuli

Population (1991)
  - Total: 4,019
- Time zone: UTC+5:45 (Nepal Time)

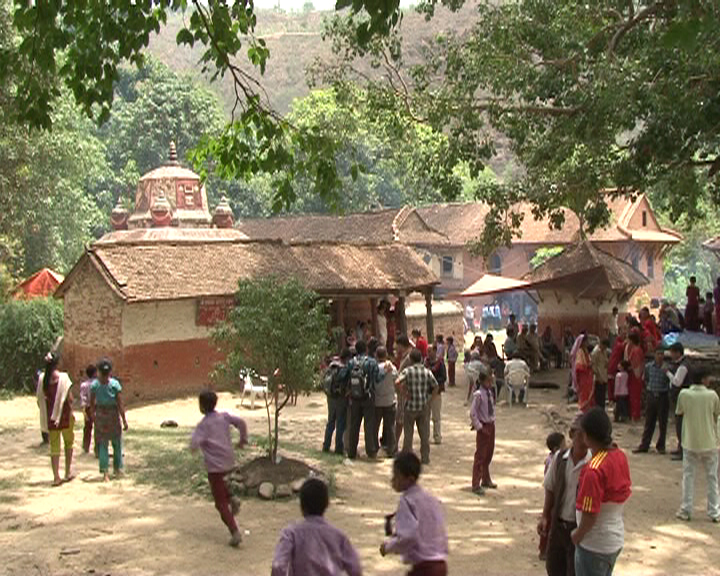

Kusheshwar Dumja is a village development committee in Sindhuli District of the Bagmati Province of Nepal. In previous administrative structure, it was in the Janakpur Zone of south-eastern region. At the time of the 1991 Nepal census it had a population of 4,019 people living in 713 individual households.

The political Koirala family, who had produced four Prime Ministers of modern Nepal, hailed from this village.
