= Tosramkhola =

Tosramkhola तोस्रामखोला
- Village development committee
- Location in Nepal
- Coordinates: 27°10′45″N 86°10′0″E
- Country: Nepal
- Zone: Janakpur Zone
- District: Sindhuli District

Population (1991)
  - Total: 1,901
- Time zone: UTC+5:45 (Nepal Time)

Tosramkhola is a village development committee in Sindhuli District in the Janakpur Zone of south-eastern Nepal. At the time of the 1991 Nepal census it had a population of 1,901 people living in 313 individual households.
