= Shanteshwari =

Shanteshwari शान्तेश्वरी
- Village Development Committee
- Location in Nepal
- Coordinates: 27°22′0″N 85°43′30″E
- Country: Nepal
- Zone: Janakpur Zone
- District: Sindhuli District

Population (1991)
  - Total: 2,385
- Time zone: UTC+5:45 (Nepal Time)

Shanteshwari is a village development committee in Sindhuli District in the Janakpur Zone of south-eastern Nepal. At the time of the 1991 Nepal census it had a population of 2,385 people living in 377 individual households.
