= Lampantar =

Lampantar लाम्पानटार
- Village development committee
- Location in Nepal
- Coordinates: 27°7′0″N 86°8′30″E
- Country: Nepal
- Zone: Janakpur Zone
- District: Sindhuli District

Population (1991)
  - Total: 4,079
- Time zone: UTC+5:45 (Nepal Time)

Lampantar is a village development committee in Sindhuli District in the Janakpur Zone of south-eastern Nepal. At the time of the 1991 Nepal census it had a population of 4,079 people living in 733 individual households.
