= Bhimeshwar, Sindhuli =

Bhimeshwar भिमेश्वर
- Village development committee
- Location in Nepal
- Coordinates: 27°18′45″N 85°59′30″E
- Country: Nepal
- Zone: Janakpur Zone
- District: Sindhuli District

Population (1991)
  - Total: 1,855
- Time zone: UTC+5:45 (Nepal Time)

Bhimeshwar is a village development committee in Sindhuli District in the Janakpur Zone of south-eastern Nepal. At the time of the 1991 Nepal census, it had a population of 1,855 people living in 326 individual households.

== Education ==
- Bhim Public High School
