= Tamajor =

Tamajor तामाजोर pachghare
- Village development committee
- Location in Nepal
- Coordinates: 27°20′0″N 85°46′0″E
- Country: Nepal
- Zone: Janakpur Zone
- District: Sindhuli District

Population (1991)
  - Total: 2,140
- Time zone: UTC+5:45 (Nepal Time)

Tamajor is a village development committee in Sindhuli District in the Janakpur Zone of south-eastern Nepal. At the time of the 1991 Nepal census, it had a population of 2,140 people living in 339 individual households.
