= Mahadevdada =

Mahadevdada महादेवडाँडा
- Village development committee
- Location in Nepal
- Coordinates: 27°8′0″N 86°17′0″E
- Country: Nepal
- Zone: Janakpur Zone
- District: Sindhuli District

Population (1991)
  - Total: 3,174
- Time zone: UTC+5:45 (Nepal Time)

Mahadevdanda is a former village development committee in Sindhuli District in the Janakpur Zone of south-eastern Nepal. At the time of the 1991 Nepal census it had a population of 3,174 people living in 537 individual households.
