= Sunam Pokhari =

Sumnam Pokhari सुम्नाम पोखरी
- Village development committee
- Location in Nepal
- Coordinates: 27°12′0″N 86°13′30″E
- Country: Nepal
- Zone: Janakpur Zone
- District: Sindhuli District

Population (1991)
  - Total: 2,126
- Time zone: UTC+5:45 (Nepal Time)

Sumnam Pokhari is a village development committee in Sindhuli District in the Janakpur Zone of south-eastern Nepal. At the time of the 1991 Nepal census it had a population of 2,126 people living in 391 individual households.
