= Kapilakot =

Kapilakot कपिलाकोट
- Village development committee
- Location in Nepal
- Coordinates: 27°17′N 85°44′E
- Country: Nepal
- Zone: Janakpur Zone
- District: Sindhuli District

Population (1991)
  - Total: 6,807
- Time zone: UTC+5:45 (Nepal Time)

VDC Map of Sindhuli District

Kapilakot is a village development committee in Sindhuli District in the Janakpur Zone of south-eastern Nepal. At the time of the 1991 Nepal census it had a population of 6,807 people living in 1,138 individual households.
