= Sitalpati, Sindhuli =

Sitalpati सितलपाटी
- Village development committee
- Location in Nepal
- Coordinates: 27°22′0″N 86°56′0″E
- Country: Nepal
- Zone: Janakpur Zone
- District: Sindhuli District

Population (1991)
  - Total: 3,292
- Time zone: UTC+5:45 (Nepal Time)

Sitalpati is a village development committee in Sindhuli District in the Janakpur Zone of south-eastern Nepal. At the time of the 1991 Nepal census it had a population of 3,292 people living in 595 individual households.
