= Bhuwaneshwar Gwaltar =

Bhuwaneshwar Gwaltar भुवनेश्वर ग्वालटार
- Village development committee
- Location in Nepal
- Coordinates: 27°16′0″N 86°3′45″E
- Country: Nepal
- Zone: Janakpur Zone
- District: Sindhuli District

Population (1991)
  - Total: 1,694
- Time zone: UTC+5:45 (Nepal Time)

Bhuwaneshwar Gwaltar was a village development committee in Sindhuli District in the Janakpur Zone of south-eastern Nepal. At the time of the 1991 Nepal census it had a population of 1,694 people living in 268 individual households.
