= Jhangajholi Ratmata, Sindhuli =

Jhangajholi Ratmata झाँगाझोली रातमाटा
- Village development committee
- Location in Nepal
- Coordinates: 27°22′30″N 85°53′30″E
- Country: Nepal
- Zone: Janakpur Zone
- District: Sindhuli District

Population (1991)
  - Total: 4,874
- Time zone: UTC+5:45 (Nepal Time)

Jhangajholi Ratmata is a village development committee in Sindhuli District in the Janakpur Zone of south-eastern Nepal. At the time of the 1991 Nepal census it had a population of 4,874 people living in 884 individual households.
