= Amale =

Place in Nepal

Amale अम्ले
- Village development committee
- Location in Nepal
- Coordinates: 27°19′0″N 85°52′0″E
- Country: Nepal
- Zone: Janakpur Zone
- District: Sindhuli District

Population (1991)
  - Total: 2,031
- Time zone: UTC+5:45 (Nepal Time)

Amale (Nepali: अम्ले) is a village development committee in Sindhuli District in the Janakpur Zone of south-eastern Nepal. At the time of the 1991 Nepal census it had a population of 2,031 people living in 334 individual households.
