= Haribol Gajurel =

Nepalese politician

Honourable Haribol Prasad Gajurel
- हरिबोल प्रसाद गजुरेल

Ministry of Agricultural Development
- In office October 12, 2015 – July 13, 2016
- President: Bidhya Devi Bhandari
- Prime Minister: K.P. Sharma Oli
- Preceded by: Hari Parajuli
- Succeeded by: Gauri Shankar Chaudhary

Member of Parliament, Pratinidhi Sabha
- In office 4 March 2018 – 18 September 2022
- Preceded by: Mohan Prasad Baral
- Succeeded by: Lekhnath Dahal
- Constituency: Sindhuli 2

Member of Constituent Assembly
- In office 21 January 2014 – 14 October 2017
- Preceded by: Nir Kumari Kunwar
- Succeeded by: Constituency abolished
- Constituency: Sindhuli 3

Personal details
- Born: 19 April 1955 (age 70) Kamalamai, Sindhuli
- Party: CPN (Maoist Centre)
- Other political affiliations: CPN (Masal); CPN (Unity Centre)
- Relations: Chandra Prakash Gajurel (cousin)

Haribol Prasad Gajurel (Nepali: हरिबोल प्रसाद गजुरेल) (alias Sital Kumar) is a Nepalese politician and a member of the Nepal House of Representatives, having been elected twice by the Sindhuli-2 constituency. He was also a member of the second constituent assembly, elected in 2013. He was also the Minister for Agricultural Development in the First Oli cabinet, but later resigned when his party, the Communist Party of Nepal (Maoist Centre), withdrew its support for the government.
