= Sindhuli District =

Coordinates: 27.252°N 85.97°E

Sindhuli District सिन्धुली
- District
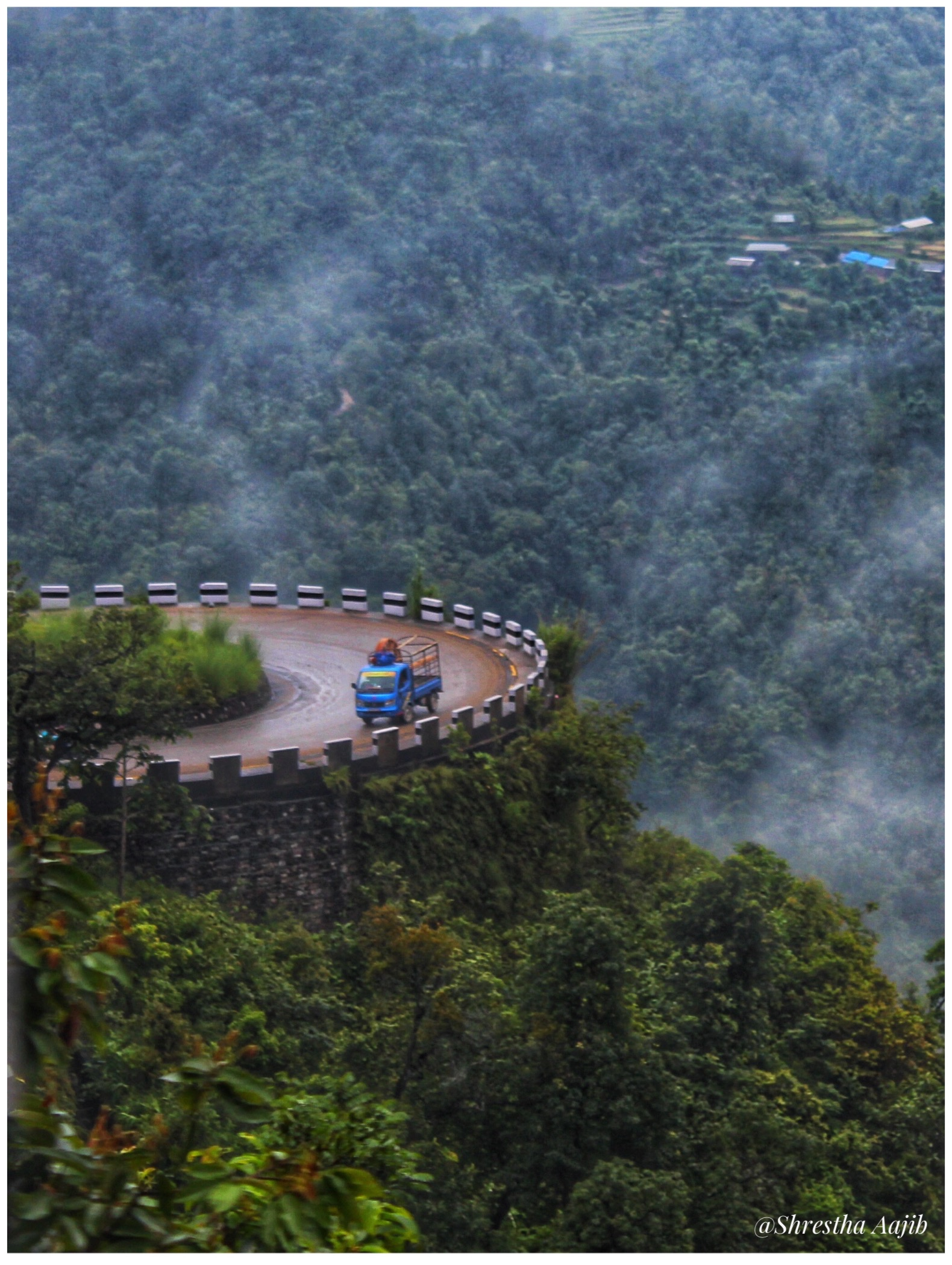
- BP Highway, Sindhuli

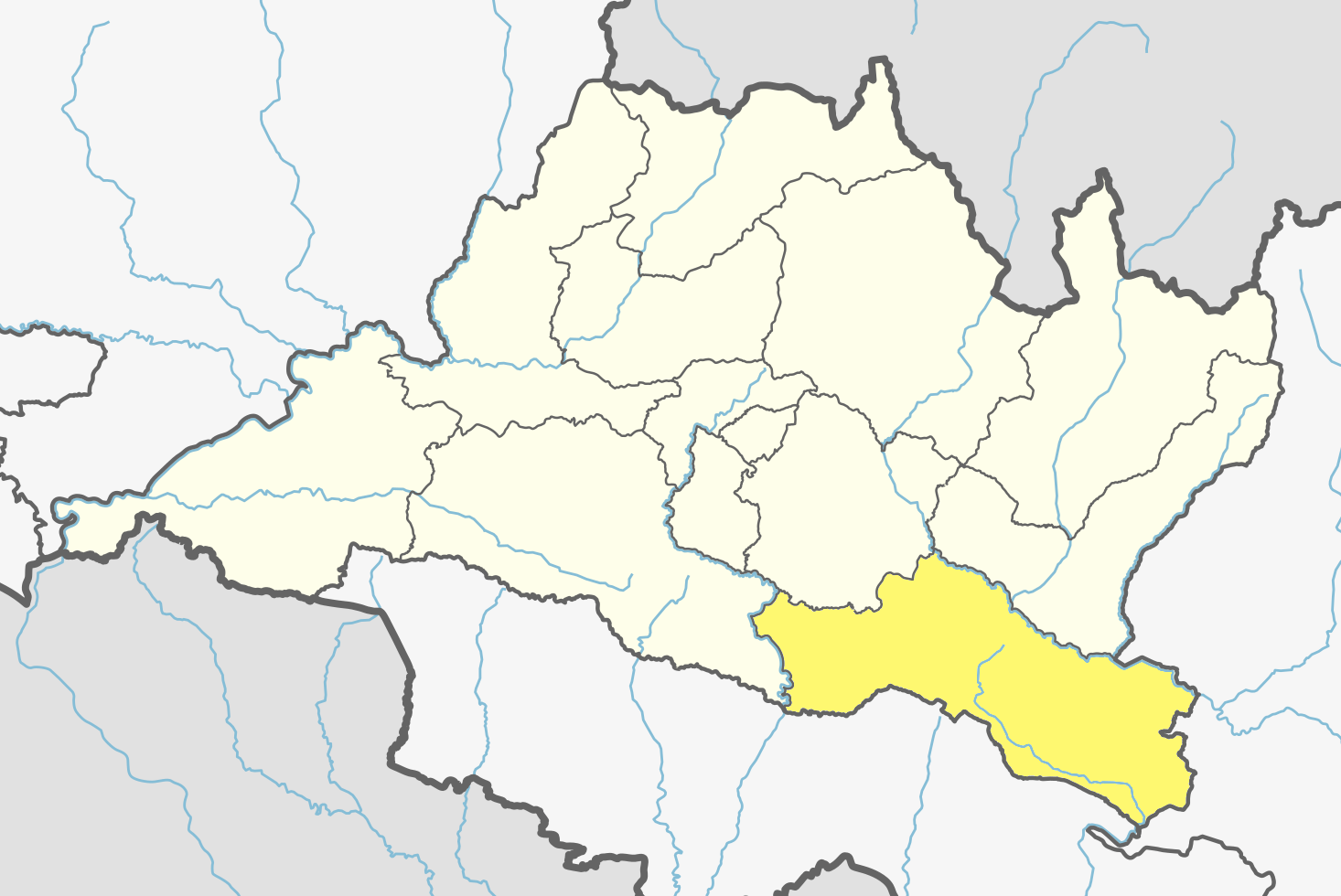
- Location of district in Bagmati Province
- Country: Nepal
- Province: Bagmati
- Established: During Rana regime
- Headquarter: Sindhulimadhi (Kamalamai)

Government
  - Type: Coordination committee
  - Body: DCC, Sindhuli
  - Parliamentary Constituencies: 2
  - Provincial Constituencies: 4

Area
  - Total: 2,491 km^{2} (962 sq mi)
- Highest elevation: 2,386 m (7,828 ft)
- Lowest elevation: 168 m (551 ft)

Population (2021)
  - Total: 300,026
  - Density: 120.4/km^{2} (311.9/sq mi)
- Time zone: UTC+05:45 (NPT)
- Postal Code: 45900
- Area Code: 047
- Main Language(s): Nepali, Tamang, Magar, Danuwar, Newari
- Website: dccsindhuli.gov.np

Sindhuli District (Nepali: सिन्धुली जिल्ला) is a district of Bagmati Province in Nepal. The district, with Sindhulimadhi (Kamalamai) as its headquarters, covers an area of 2,491 km^{2} (962 sq mi). It is divided into nine local bodies with two municipalities and seven rural municipalities. As per the 2021 census, Sindhuli district has a population of 300,026.

Sindhuli district is composed of Inner Terai and hilly areas. It is classified as Inner Terai District for administrative purposes. It borders 10 other districts, making it the district that borders the most districts. It borders Koshi Province to the east and Madhesh Province to the south.

The district is famous for the historic Sindhuli Gadhi Fort where troops of British East India Company were defeated by Gorkhali Army in 1767 A.D (1824 B.S). The iconic BP Highway passes through this district. Sindhuli is also known for the production of Junar (sweet orange).

According to the former administrative divisions of Nepal, Sindhuli fell under Janakpur Zone in Central Development Region. Sindhuli Gadhi was the headquarter of the district till 1967 A.D (2023 B.S).

== Etymology ==
Sindhuli District is named after the Sindhuli Valley (Sindhulimadhi and surrounding areas). Various accounts are associated with the naming of Sindhuli and there is no definite evidence explaining how the place got its name “Sindhuli (सिन्धुली)”.

- One belief is that the name "Sindhuli" originated from the name of King Sindhul (सिन्धुल), who ruled this area in ancient times.
- About 11 kilometers from the district headquarter Sindhulimadhi, at an elevation of 1,077 meters above sea level, lies Siddhababa (सिद्धबाबा) Temple. Sindhuli Valley used to be referred as Siddhasthali (सिद्धस्थली), named after this temple. The word “Siddhasthali” later became distorted over time and eventually evolved into “Sindhuli”.
- Before the unification of Nepal, Sindhuli was the part of the Makawanpur Kingdom, which was ruled by kings of the Sen dynasty. Sindhuli Valley was the hunting and fishing area for those rulers and their officials. The fishing was done by creating a small structure in the river, called Duwali (दुवाली). Locally, the fishing Duwali used by the Sen kings used to be referred as Sen Ko Duwali (सेनको दुवाली), which meant Sen's Duwali. When spoken quickly, it became Senduwali (सेनदुवाली). Gradually the word got distorted into "Senduli (सेनदुली)", and eventually became “Sindhuli.”
- This region has the presence of intense forest. An indigenous group (Tamangs) were predominant in this region and their way of living was dependent on agriculture and forest resources. These indigenous people call Singthuwa (सिङ्थुवा) for cutting down tree and Singthuji (सिङ्थुजी) for collecting timber. Over time due to gradual deviation in the pronunciation, the region got its name "Sindhuli".

== History ==
=== Before unification of Nepal ===
Sindhuli has been the historical and important route linking the Kathmandu Valley with the eastern hills and the southern plains, giving it strategic and economic significance. Local forts and hill strongholds, including Sindhuli Gadhi, were controlled by regional powers and functioned as defensive outposts and transit points for trade and movement. Doyas of Karnat Dynasty in 1244 A.D and Shamsuddin Ilyas Shah, Sultan of Bengal in 1349 A.D, used the route of Sindhuli Gadhi to attack Kathmandu Valley. Prior to unification of Nepal, Sindhuli was the part of Makawanpur Kingdom, ruled by kings of the Sen dynasty.

=== Battle of Sindhuli ===
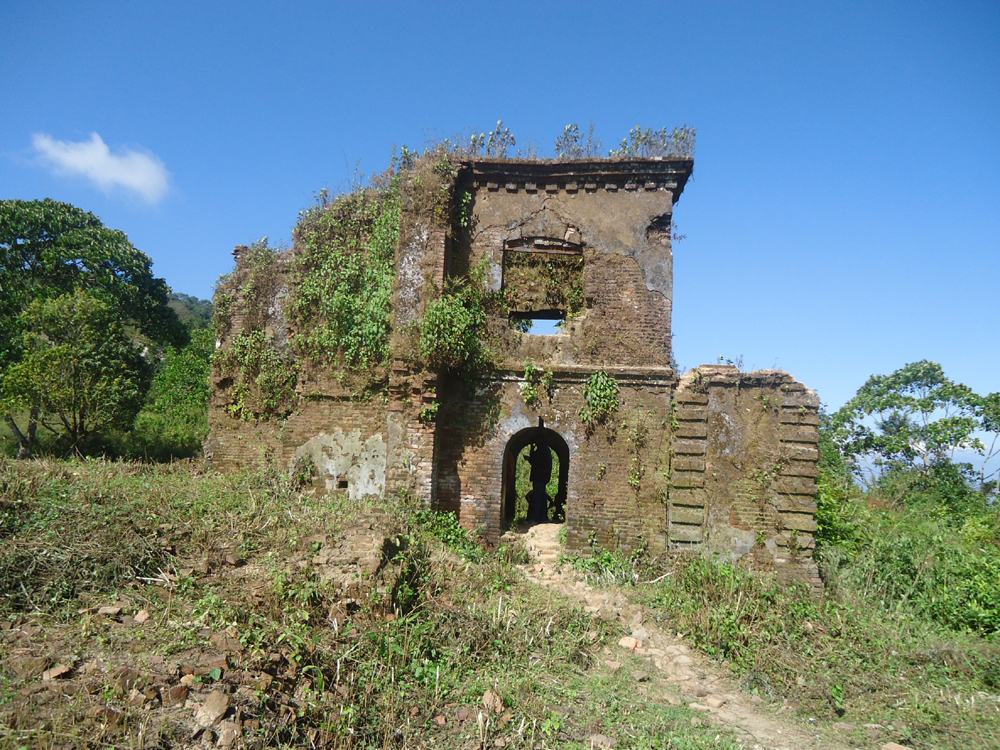
Ruins of Sindhuli Gadhi Fort

The Battle of Sindhuli, fought in 1767 A.D (1824 B.S), stands as one of the most important military victories in the history of Nepal. It was a confrontation between the Gorkhali forces, led under the broader unification campaign of King Prithvi Narayan Shah, and the troops of the British East India Company. The battle demonstrated the strength, strategy, and determination of the Gorkhali army and played a crucial role in protecting Nepal’s independence.

During the mid-18th century, King Prithvi Narayan Shah was actively working to unify the many small kingdoms of the Himalayan region into a single nation. At the same time, the British East India Company was expanding its influence in the Indian subcontinent. When the King of Kantipur (Kathmandu), Jaya Prakash Malla sought British help to counter the Gorkhali advance, a British force under Captain Kinloch was sent toward Kathmandu. To reach the valley, the troops had to pass through the difficult hill region of Sindhuli Gadhi.

The Gorkhali forces took full advantage of the rugged terrain and dense forests of Sindhuli Gadhi. Instead of facing the British in open battle, they used guerrilla warfare tactics—ambushing supply lines, blocking routes, and constantly harassing the advancing troops. The British soldiers, unfamiliar with the landscape and suffering from shortages of food and supplies, became exhausted and demoralized.

Unable to withstand the continuous pressure and harsh conditions, the British troops were forced to retreat. This defeat was significant because it showed that a well-organized local force, using smart strategy and knowledge of the land, could defeat a powerful foreign army. The victory at Sindhuli Gadhi strengthened the Gorkhali position and discouraged further British military involvement in Nepal at that time.

=== Rana rule ===
During the Rana regime, Sindhuli was established as a district with a Gadhi administration headquartered at Sindhuli Gadhi.

=== Later period ===
After the fall of Rana regime in 1951, Sindhuli was merged with East No. 2 (Ramechhap).

Sindhuli was again reestablished as a district in 1962 A.D (2019 B.S) with Sindhuli Gadhi as its headquarter, when Nepal was divided into 75 districts and 14 zones. On 2 January 1967 A.D (18 Poush 2023 B.S), the district headquarter was moved to Sindhulimadhi.

During Panchayat era, Sindhuli gradually experienced administrative and social changes. Infrastructure development, including roads and public services, expanded slowly due to the district’s hilly terrain. In the 1990s and 2000s, Sindhuli, like many districts of Nepal, was affected by political movements, including the Maoist insurgency.

== Geography and Climate ==
=== Topography ===
Sindhuli District consists of a diverse landscape that includes the Mahabharat Hills and Chure Hills, with majority of the district lying in Inner Terai region. Forests cover two-thirds of the district's total area.

Mahabharat Hills (Lower Himalayan Range) occupy the northern belt of the district. The highest point of the district, Phikkal Peak with an elevation of 2,386 meters above sea level, lies in this region.

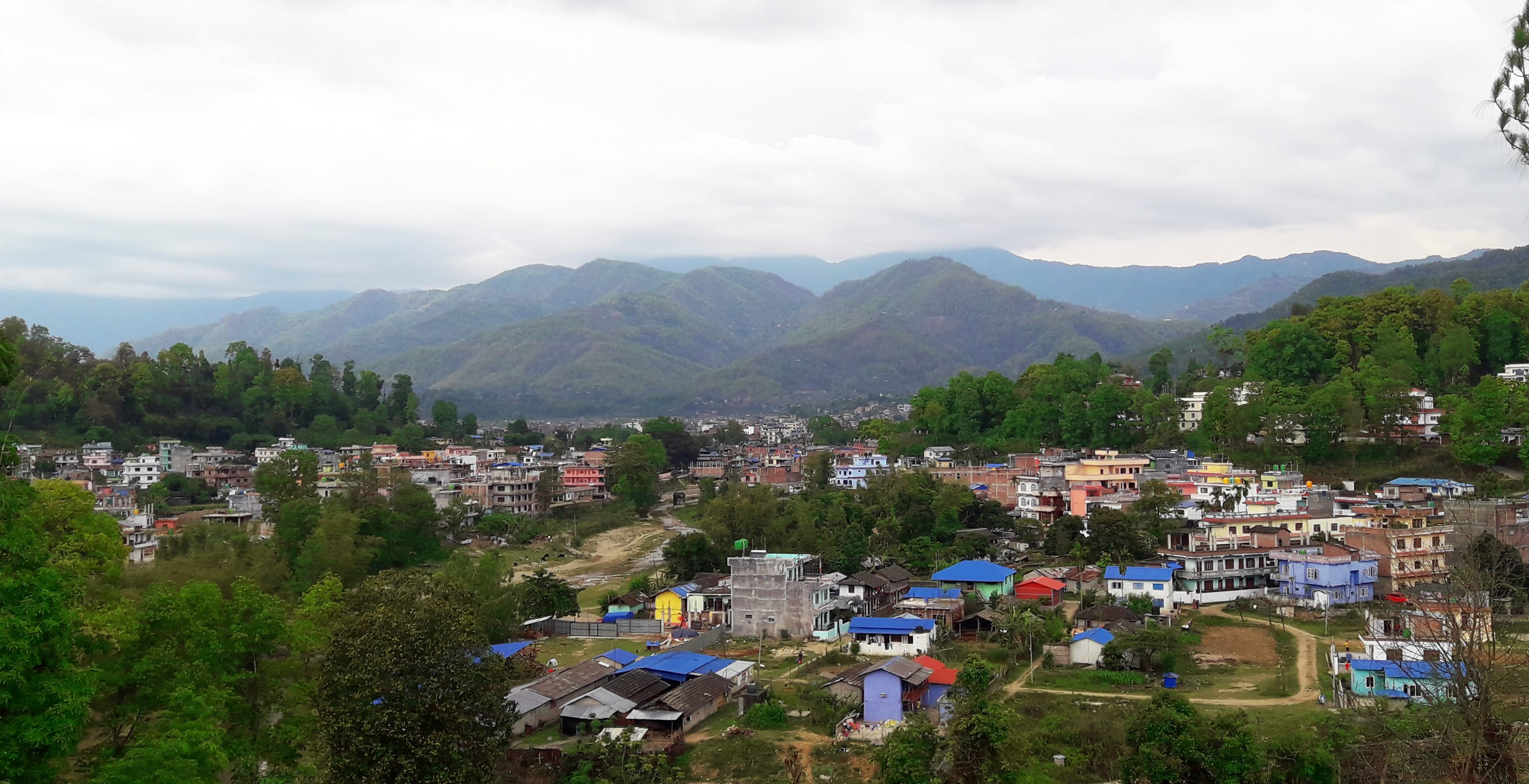
Sindhulimadhi in Sindhuli Valley

The middle section of district is composed of the Inner Terai region. This region includes river valleys and plains such as Sindhuli Valley, Kamala Plain, Marin Plain and Tinpatan Valley Plain. The majority of the district's population reside in this region. The lowest point of the district at an elevation of 168 meters above sea level is in Dudhauli, which lies in this region.

The southern belt is occupied by Chure (Sivalik) Hills. These hills are covered with dense forest and separate the rest of the district from outer (main) Terai.

=== Rivers ===
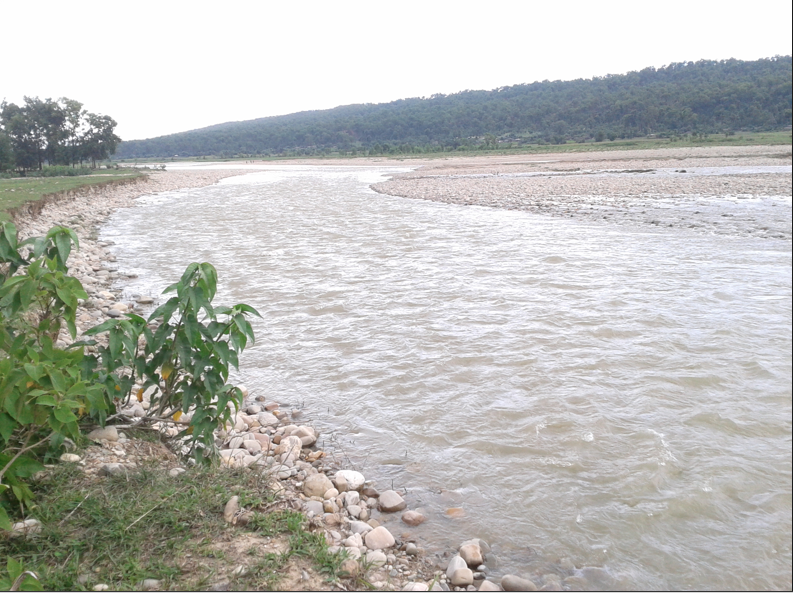
Kamala River

Sindhuli district has a total of 149 large and small rivers. Majority of rivers originate from Mahabharat Hills, with some from Chure Hills. Major rivers include Kamala, Marin, Chadaha, Gwang (Gaumati), Thakur Khola, Kyan Khola and Bitijor Khola.The Sunkoshi River flows along the northern border of the district while the Bagmati River flows along its western border.

=== District Border ===
Sindhuli borders 10 districts and 2 provinces which are as follows:

East: Udayapur (Koshi) and Siraha (Madhesh)

West: Rautahat (Madhesh), Makawanpur and Kavrepalanchok

North: Okhaldhunga (Koshi) and Ramechhap

South: Dhanusha, Mahottari and Sarlahi, all of which belong to Madhesh Province

=== Climate ===
Climate Zone	Elevation Range	% of Area
Lower Tropical	below 300 meters (1,000 ft)	13.7%
Upper Tropical	300 to 1,000 meters 1,000 to 3,300 ft.	61.7%
Subtropical	1,000 to 2,000 meters 3,300 to 6,600 ft.	23.6%
Temperate	2,000 to 3,000 meters 6,400 to 9,800 ft.	0.5%

== Administration ==
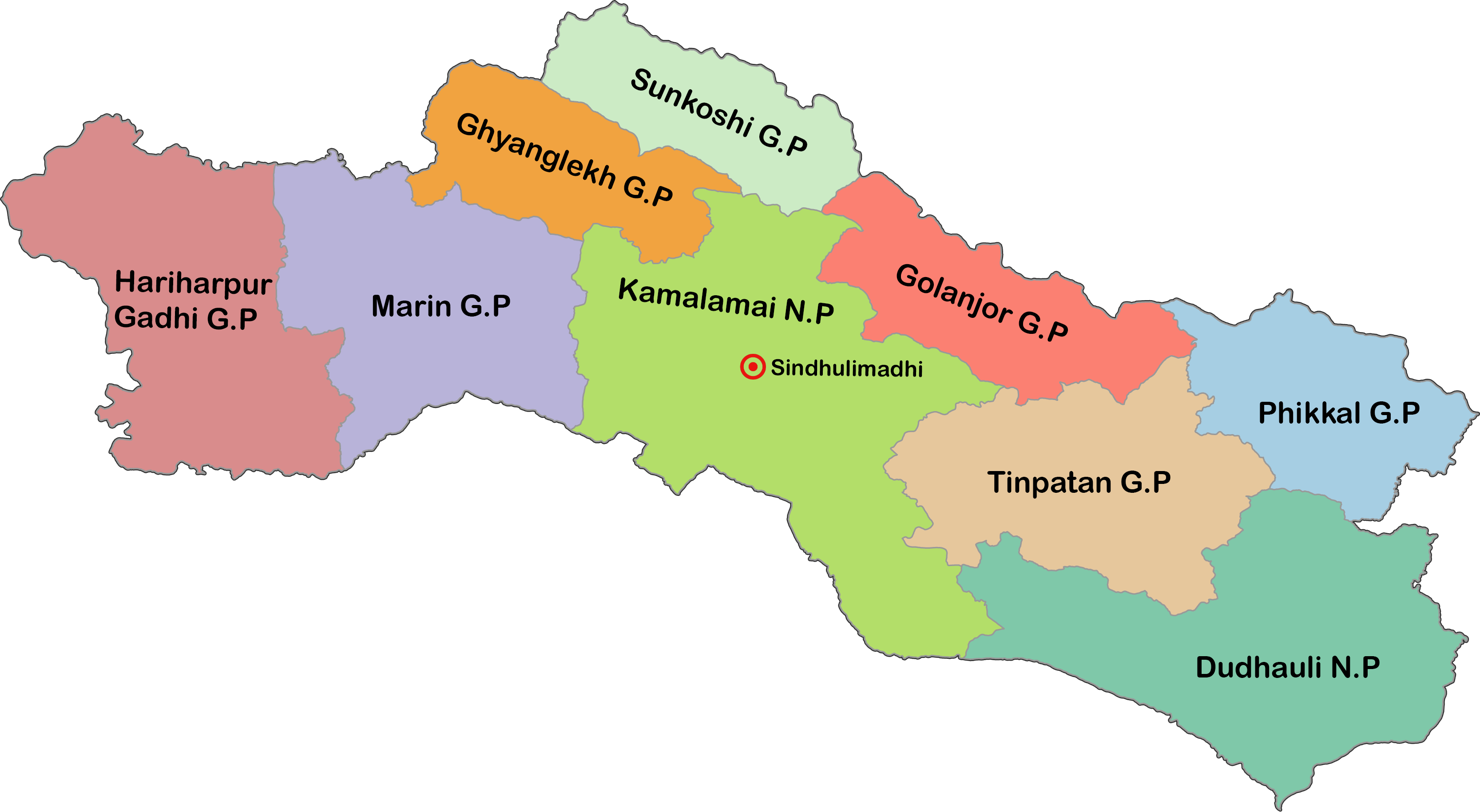
Sindhuli Local Level Map

Sindhuli District is administered from headquarter Sindhulimadhi, Kamalamai. District Administration Office (DAO), under Ministry of Home Affairs is responsible for administration, as well as maintaining law and order in the district. DAO is headed by Chief District Officer (CDO).District Coordination Committee (DCC) maintains coordination among local bodies, and with provincial and federal government.

Sindhuli District Court has jurisdiction over criminal and civil cases within the district. 13 post offices are functioning in the district which comes under the Sindhuli District Post Office (DPO) with 45900 as its postal code.

=== Local Bodies ===
The district consists of nine local bodies, out of which two are Municipalities and seven are Rural Municipalities. These are as follows:

S.N	Name	Name in Nepali	No. of Wards	Area (km^{2})	Population (2021)	Administrative Centre	Distance from District H.Q (km)
1	Kamalamai Municipality	कमलामाई नगरपालिका	14	482.57	71,016	Sindhulimadhi	0
2	Dudhauli Municipality	दुधौली नगरपालिका	14	390.39	70,207	Dudhauli	57
3	Tinpatan Rural Municipality	तीनपाटन गाउँपालिका	11	280.26	34,889	Lampantar (Chakmake)	38
4	Marin Rural Municipality	मरिण गाउँपालिका	7	324.55	28,808	Kapilakot (Chhap Bazar)	26
5	Hariharpurgadhi Rural Municipality	हरिहरपुरगढी गाउँपालिका	8	343.90	26,505	Jhanjhane	56
6	Golanjor Rural Municipality	गोलन्जोर गाउँपालिका	7	184.13	18,737	Bhuwaneshwari Gwaltar	50
7	Sunkoshi Rural Municipality	सुनकोशी गाउँपालिका	7	154.68	18,375	Purano Jhangajholi (Ramtar)	65
8	Phikkal Rural Municipality	फिक्कल गाउँपालिका	6	186.06	15,910	Khangsang	75
9	Ghyanglekh Rural Municipality	घ्याङलेख गाउँपालिका	5	166.77	12,652	Bastipur (Hayutar)	35

=== Former Village Development Committees ===
There were total of 55 Village Development Committees (VDCs) in Sindhuli till 1997. After the formation of Kamalamai Municipality in 1997, the number of VDCs got reduced to 53. In 2014, Dudhauli Municipality was formed and the number of VDCs got further reduced to 50. On 10 March 2017, as part of Nepal's restructuring of local bodies, the existing VDCs were abolished and incorporated into Municipalities and Rural Municipalities.

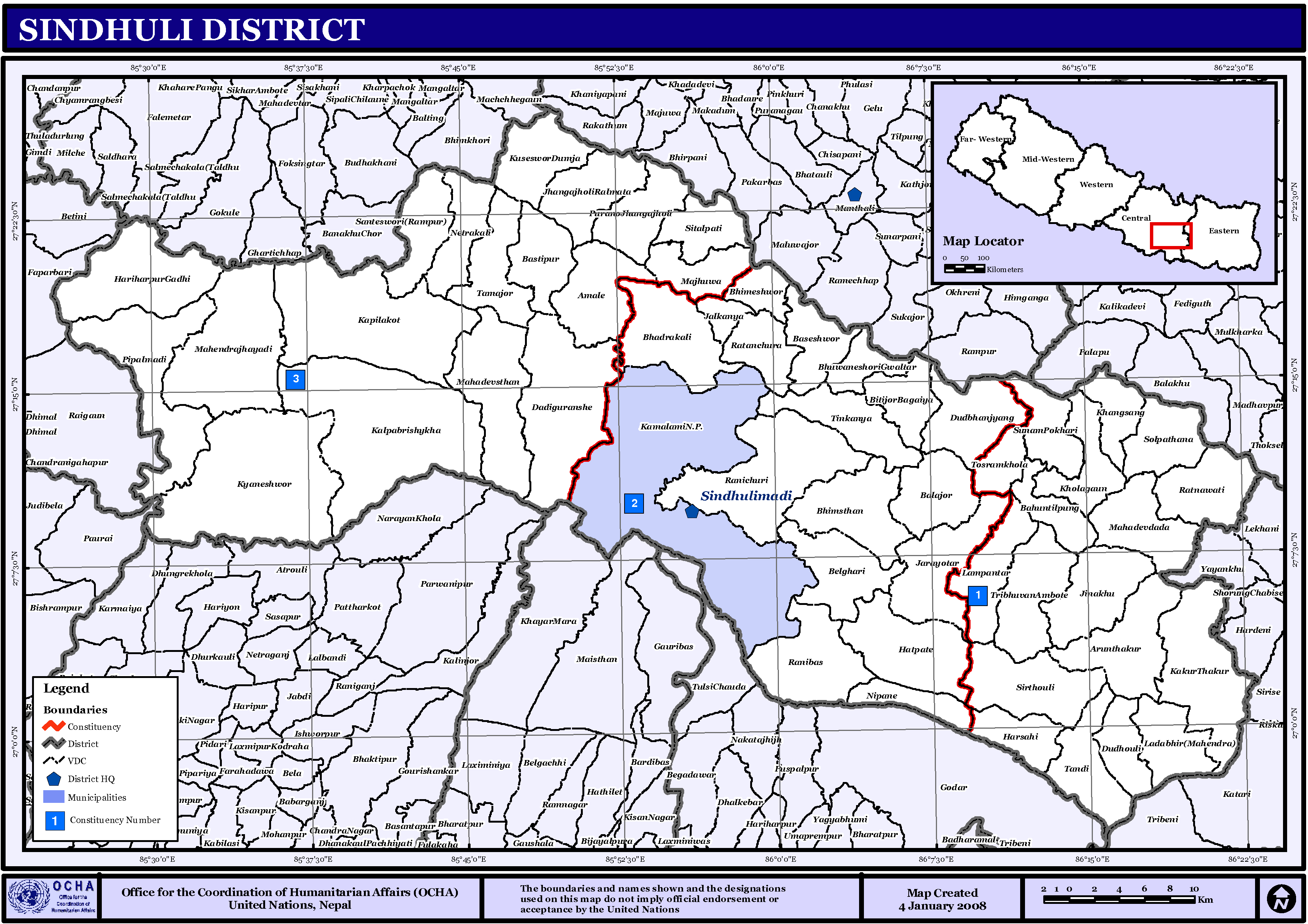
Map of former VDCs and Municipalities of Sindhuli (before 2014)

S.N	Local Body	Incorporated VDCs	Incorporated Date
1	Kamalamai Municipality	Siddheshwar and Bhiman	27 March 1997
1	Kamalamai Municipality	Dandiguranse, Bhadrakali, Jalkanya, Ranichuri and Ranibas	10 March 2017
2	Dudhauli Municipality	Dudhauli, Tandi and Ladabhir	2 December 2014
2	Dudhauli Municipality	Hatpate, Nipane, Sirthauli, Harsahi, Arun Thakur, Kakur Thakur and Jinakhu	10 March 2017
3	Tinpatan Rural Municipality	Belghari, Bhimsthan, Jarayotar, Balajor, Tosramkhola, Bahuntilpung, Tribhuvan Ambote and Lampantar	10 March 2017
4	Marin Rural Municipality	Kapilakot, Kalpabrikshya and Mahadevsthan	10 March 2017
5	Hariharpurgadhi Rural Municipality	Hariharpurgadhi, Pipalmadi, Mahendrajhyadi and Kyaneshwar	10 March 2017
6	Golanjor Rural Municipality	Dudbhanjyang, Bitijor Bagaincha, Bhuwaneshwari Gwaltar, Tinkanya, Ratanchura, Baseshwar and Bhimeshwar	10 March 2017
7	Sunkoshi Rural Municipality	Kusheshwar Dumja, Jhangajholi Ratmata, Purano Jhangajholi, Sitalpati and Majhuwa	10 March 2017
8	Phikkal Rural Municipality	Mahadevdanda, Sumnam Pokhari, Kholagaun, Khangsang, Solpathana and Ratnawati	10 March 2017
9	Ghyanglekh Rural Municipality	Amale, Bastipur, Tamajor, Netrakali and Shanteshwari (Rampur)	10 March 2017

== Electoral Constituencies ==
Sindhuli District is divided into two Parliamentary constituencies and four Provincial constituencies.

Parliamentary Constituency	Provincial Constituency	Incorporated Areas	MLA	MP
Sindhuli 1	Sindhuli 1A	Dudhauli and Kamalamai (Wards 9, 13 & 14)	Matrika Prasad Bhattarai (NCP)	Dhanendra Karki (RSP)
Sindhuli 1	Sindhuli 1B	Tinpatan, Phikkal and Golanjor	Ram Kumar Pahadi (Nepali Congress)	Dhanendra Karki (RSP)
Sindhuli 2	Sindhuli 2A	Kamalamai (Wards 1-8, 10-12 ) and Sunkoshi	Chhetra Bahadur Bamjan (Nepali Congress)	Aashish Gajurel (RSP)
Sindhuli 2	Sindhuli 2B	Marin, Hariharpurgadhi and Ghyanglekh	Ganganarayan Shrestha (NCP)	Aashish Gajurel (RSP)

== Demographics ==
Historical population
Census year	Pop.	±% p.a.
1981	183,705	—
1991	223,900	+2.00%
2001	279,821	+2.25%
2011	296,192	+0.57%
2021	300,026	+0.13%
Source: Citypopulation

Castes/ethnic groups in Sindhuli District (2021)
1. Tamang (26.7%)
2. Magar (14.1%)
3. Chhetri (13.3%)
4. Bahun (7.26%)
5. Danuwar (6.32%)
6. Newar (6.23%)
7. Kami (4.85%)
8. Sarki (3.63%)
9. Majhi (3.62%)
10. Damai (3.16%)
11. Sunuwar (2.85%)
12. Bhujel (1.50%)
13. Rai (1.46%)
14. Madheshi non-Dalit (1.47%)
15. Other Khas non-Dalit (1.35%)
16. Other Hill Janjati (1.07%)
17. Others (1.23%)
Languages of Sindhuli district (2021)
1. Nepali (52.4%)
2. Tamang (25.1%)
3. Magar (8.11%)
4. Danuwar (6.61%)
5. Nepal Bhasha (2.08%)
6. Maithili (1.80%)
7. Sunuwar (1.10%)
8. Others (2.82%)

At the time of the 2021 Nepal census, Sindhuli District had a population of 300,026. 8.04% of the population is under 5 years of age. It has a literacy rate of 72.59% and a sex ratio of 1040 females per 1000 males. 141,223 (47.07%) lived in municipalities.

Ethnicity wise: Hill Janajatis were the largest group, making up 57% of the population. Tamangs were the largest Hill Janajatis making 26.7% of population, with Magars being 14.1% of the population. Khas (Chhetri, Bahun, Kami, Damai etc.) made up 34% of the population.

At the time of the 2021 census, 52.35% of the population spoke Nepali, 25.13% Tamang, 8.11% Magar, 6.61% Danuwar, 2.08% Nepal Bhasha, 1.80% Maithili and 1.10% Sunuwar as their first language. In 2011, 48.1% of the population spoke Nepali as their first language.

Religion in Sindhuli District (2021)
Religion	Percent
Hinduism	68.24%
Buddhism	26.92%
Kirat Mundhum	2.21%
Christianity	1.84%
Prakriti	0.67%
Other or not stated	0.12%

== Economy ==
Agriculture is the primary economic activity in the Sindhuli district. Crops like rice, maize, wheat, potatoes, millet as well as seasonal fruits and vegetables are grown in fertile Inner Terai region.

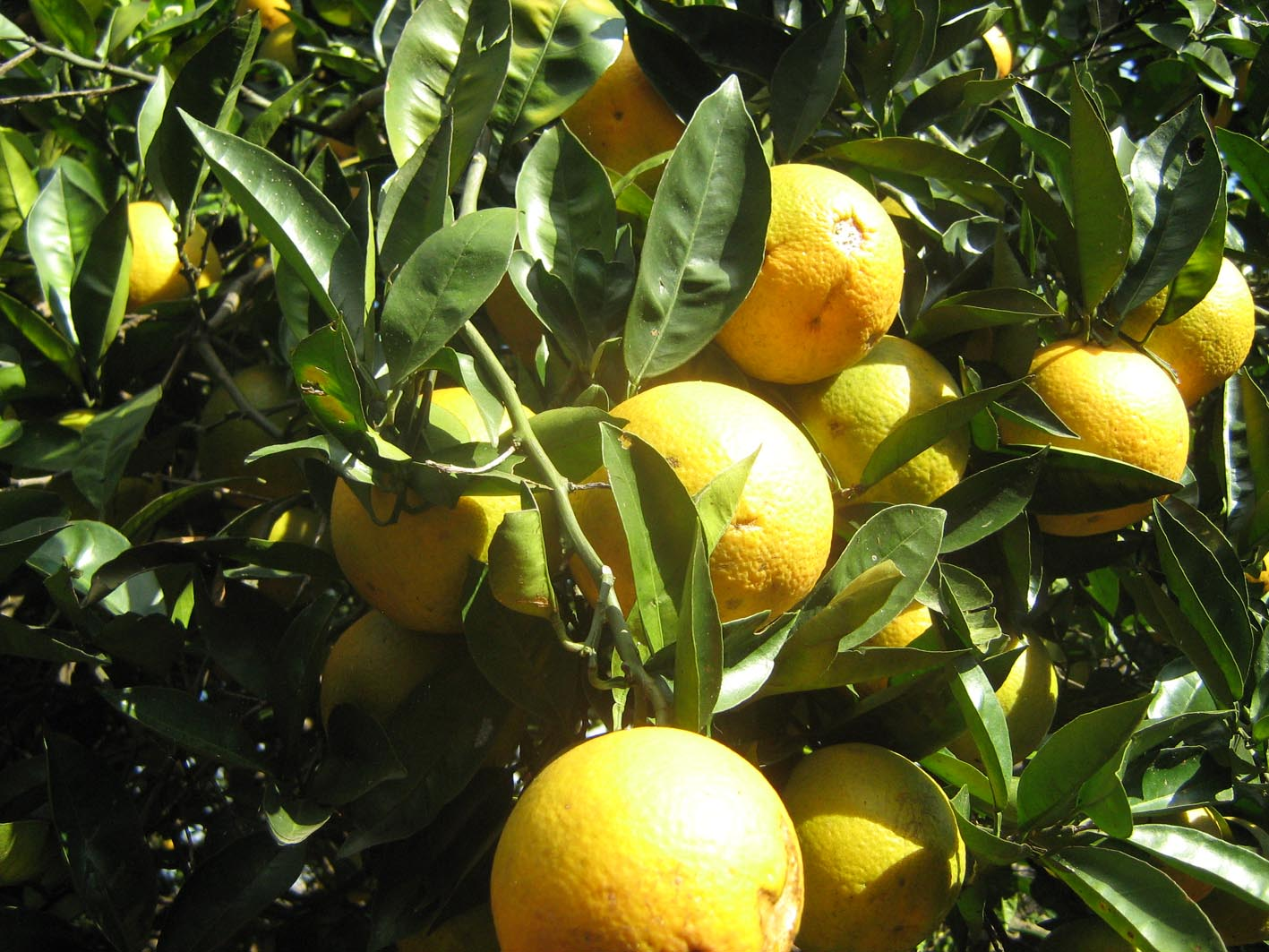
Junar

Sindhuli is popular for the production of Junar (sweet orange), botanically known as Citrus Sinensis. The district is the leading producer of Junar in Nepal. Because of this, Sindhuli is also known as Junar Ko Jilla (District of Junar). The fruit is cultivated in the Mahabharat Hill Range between the altitude of 800 meters and 1300 meters. Junar farming in Sindhuli provides good source of cash income to farmers.

Apart from agriculture, people are also engaged in livestock farming including poultry and dairy production. A significant number of households are dependent on remittances from abroad.

Tourism is a developing sector in Sindhuli. Natural, cultural and historical attractions draw visitors to the district. In support of tourism, a range of hotels and resorts operate in the district, particularly around urban areas and highways.

Sindhulimadhi serves as the commercial hub of the district. As both the district headquarters and principal market town, it serves as a focal point for business activities and services within the region. Other economic centers include Bhiman, Dudhauli and Khurkot.

== Transportation ==
=== Regional ===
Sindhuli District is connected to National Highway Network by three highways: BP Highway, Madan Bhandari (Inner Terai) Highway and Mid-Hill (Pushpalal) Highway.

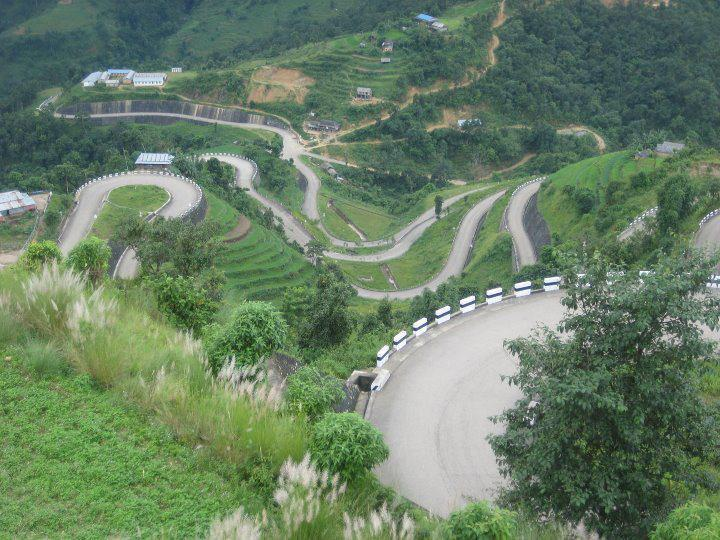
BP Highway

BP Highway (NH13), known for its scenic route links the district to National Capital Kathmandu and Terai. Two-thirds of the highway length lies in this district. The road connects headquarter Sindhulimadhi to Mahendra (East-West) Highway (NH 01) at Bardibas, Mahottari and to Araniko Highway (NH 34) at Dhulikhel, Kavre. It runs through the diverse landscape of Chure, Inner Terai, Mahabharat Hills, and Sunkoshi River corridor. The highway passes through major places like Bhiman, Sindhulimadhi, Sindhuli Gadhi, Khurkot and Nepalthok.

The Dharan-Hetauda section of Madan Bhandari (Inner Terai) Highway (NH 9) runs through the Inner Terai areas of Sindhuli. It connects the district to Katari, Udayapur in the east and to Provincial Capital Hetauda in the west. The highway passes through Dudhauli and merges with BP Highway at Bhiman. The highway resumes at Sindhulimadhi and runs westwards towards Hetauda.

Mid-Hill (Pushpalal) Highway (NH03) connects the hilly districts of Koshi Province to BP Highway. It runs through the eastern hilly areas of the district, following the Sunkoshi River, and merges with the BP Highway at Khurkot.

Long-route vehicles operate from Sindhulimadhi to various cities like Kathmandu, Pokhara, Biratnagar, Janakpur, Birgunj and Hetauda. Janakpur Airport is the closest major airport to Sindhuli, situated about 70 km from Sindhulimadhi by road, with regular flights to and from Kathmandu.

=== Local ===
Most parts of Sindhuli are accessible by road. While many roads have been paved, some rural roads are still unpaved and can be challenging during monsoon. Buses and vans operate regularly from Sindhulimadhi to various parts of the district. In urban areas, auto rickshaws have become a common mode of transport.

== Education ==
=== Primary and secondary education ===
Sindhuli district especially Kamalamai Municipality has a facility of education up to SEE levels. Many private colleges run +2 commerce affiliated to NEB, however, the number of +2 science colleges are very few. Science college like Kamala Higher Secondary School is providing practical education to students of Sindhuli. This college has been serving as the center of excellence for all science students throughout Sindhuli Valley. There is also a secondary school for deaf children, where instruction is provided entirely through Nepali Sign Language, including free accommodation.

==== Schools ====
- Shree Navajyoti Deaf Secondary School, Jasedamar
- Lampantar English Boarding School, Chakmake Bazar, Sindhuli
- Sindhuli Academy
- New English Boarding School
- Kamala Higher Secondary School
- Siddhasthali English Boarding Secondary School
- Shree Jana Jyoti Higher Secondary School
- Bainkateshwor Higher Secondary School
- Gaumati Higher Secondary School
- Barun Devi Higher Secondary School
- Shree Deurali Lower Secondary School
- Shree Bhabishya Nirmata Siddhabba Higher Secondary School
- Kalimati Nimna Secondary School
- Siddhababa English Boarding School
- Scholars Academy
- New Star Academy
- Suryodaya Secondary English Boarding School
- Janata Higher secondary English Boarding School
- Shree Sindhuli Gadhi Public English School
- Sindhuli Vidhyashram Public Educational Trust
- Swiss Sindhuli Secondary English Medium School
- Aadhunik English Boarding School
- Shree Prabhat higher secondary school
- Shree Jana Jagriti HSS, Bhiman
- Shining Moon Academy
- Shree Saraswati Secondary School, Dakaha
- Kamala Academic School, Bhiman
- Shree Kundeshwor Higher Secondary School, Besare Besi
- Shree Marin Academy Boarding School
- Shree Secondary School Kartike, Kapilakot
- Shree Kusheshwor Vidhya Peeth Secondary School, Sunkoshi-1, Dumja, Sindhuli
- Ma.Vi. Lampantar, Tinpatan 11, Lampiantar, Sindhuli

=== Higher education ===
There are many colleges which facilitate higher education. There are a large number of colleges running courses with affiliation to universities of Nepal. Colleges like Sindhuli Multiple Campus fall under this category. Kamala Science Campus enables students to acquire Bachelor of Science courses (BSc.).

==== Colleges ====
- Kamala Science Campus
- Sindhuli Multiple College
- Siddha Jyoti Siksha College
- Gaumati Multiple College
- Bhim Jyoti Campus
- Marin Multiple College
- Saraswati Campus Dakaha
- Lampantar multiple campus

=== Technical education ===
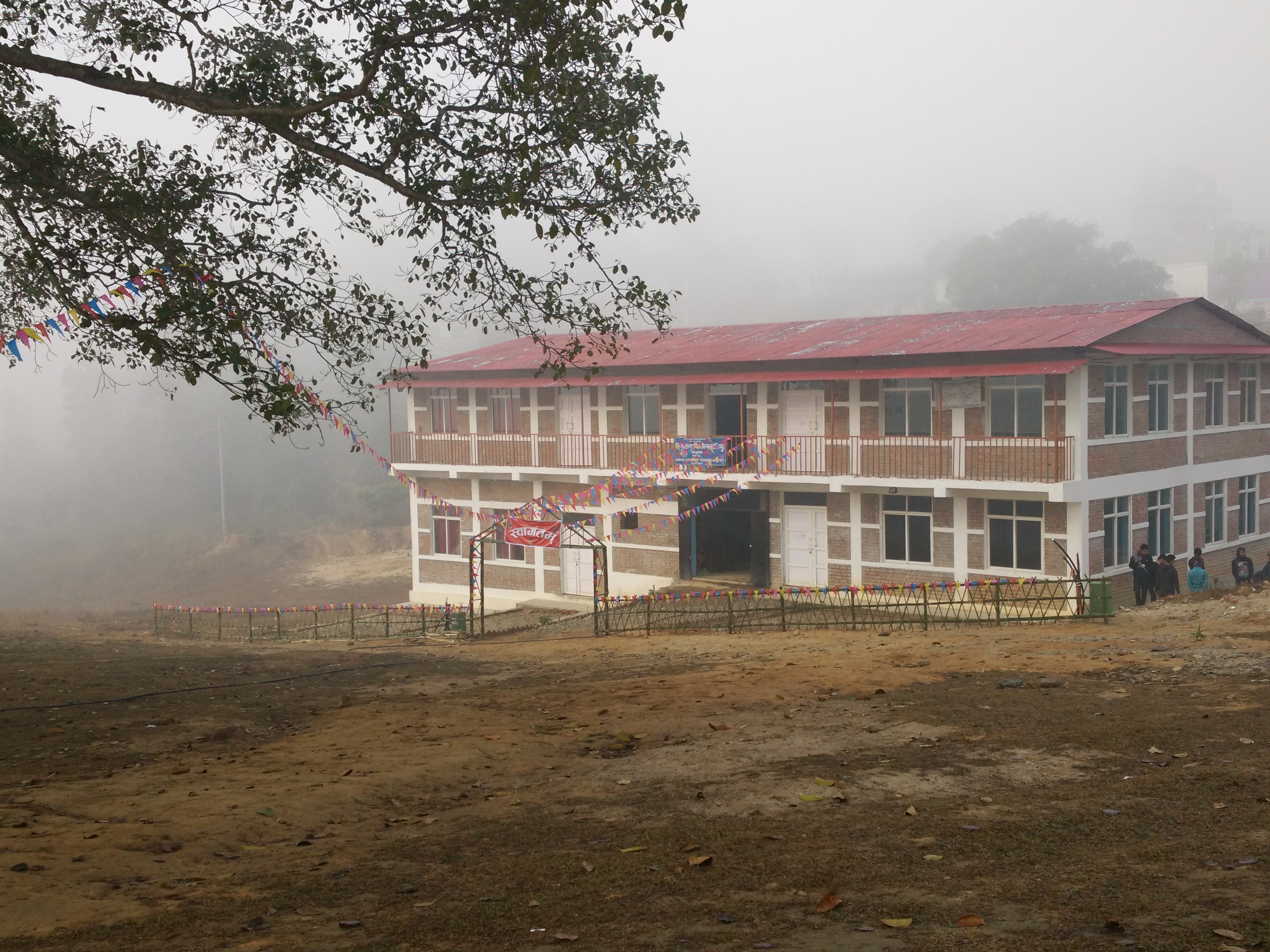
Sindhuli Community Technical Institute

There are also colleges to teach technical education. The technical subjects affiliated with CTEVT like Civil Overseer i.e. Sub Engineer, and Forestry are taught here. The district offers higher education in technical fields like B.Sc.ag (AFU) and B.Tech. IT (KU) .

==== Technical colleges ====
- College of Natural Resource Management, Marin
- Sindhuli Community Technical Institute (SCTI)
- Kamala Janajyoti Secondary School
- Saraswati Secondary School Dakaha

== Places of Attraction ==
=== Historic sites ===
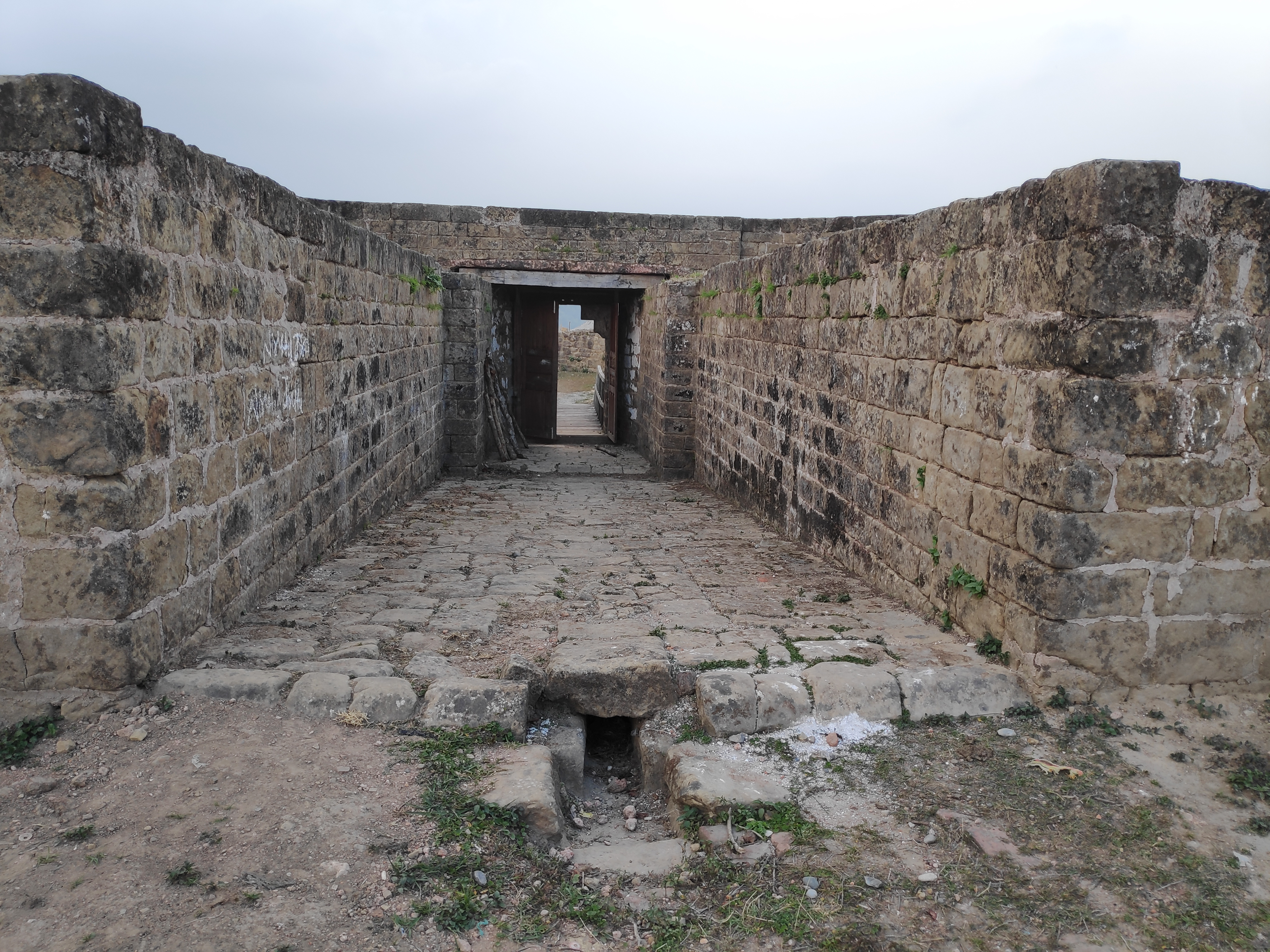
Hariharpur Gadhi Fort

- Sindhuli Gadhi Fort
- Hariharpur Gadhi Fort

=== Religious sites ===
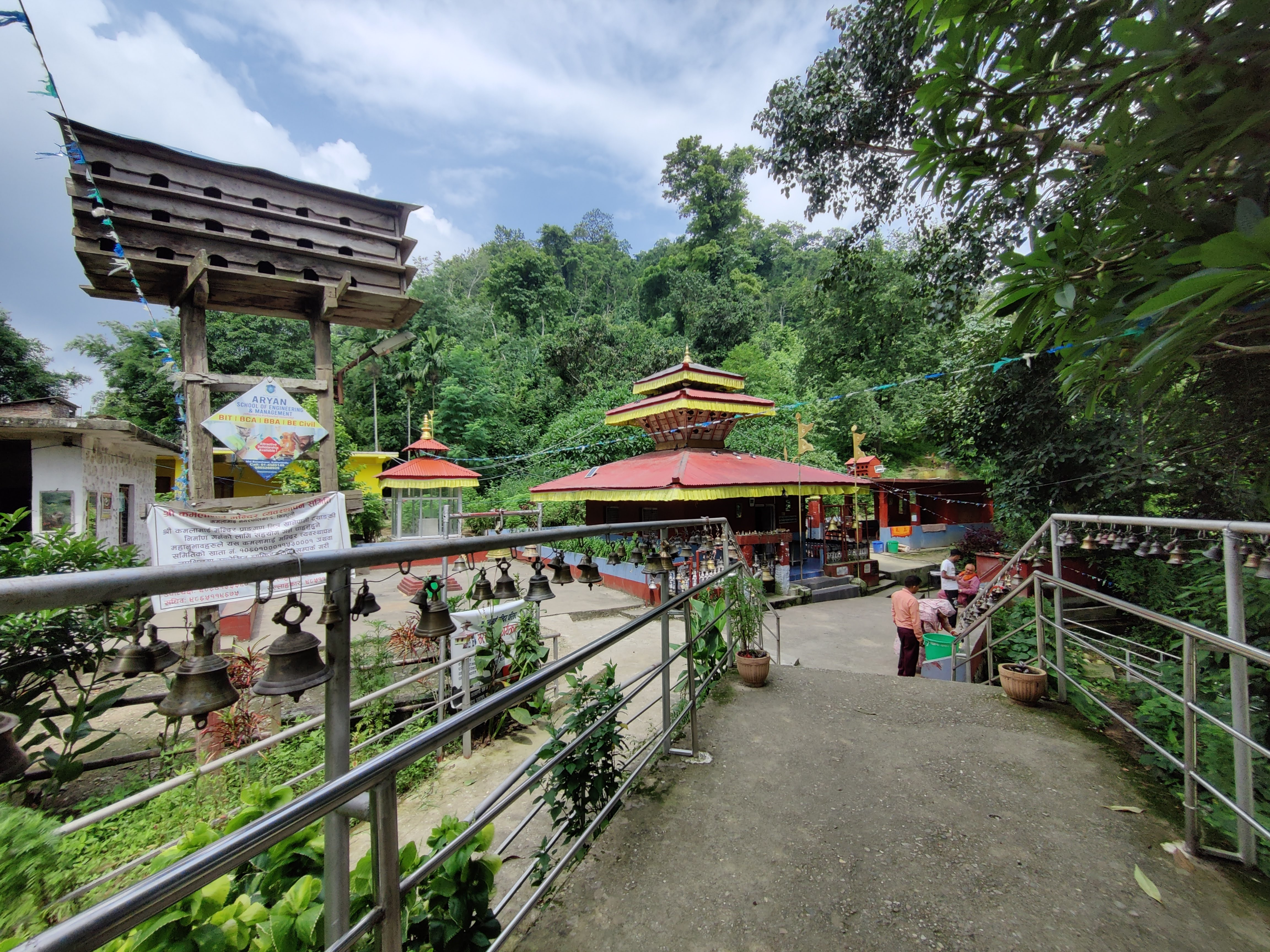
Kamalamai Temple

- Kamalamai Temple (Maithan)
- Siddhababa Temple
- Kalimai Temple
- Bhadrakali Temple
- Langureshwar-Madhuganga Mahadev Cave
- Kusheshwar Temple
- Panchakanya Pokhari

== Notable people ==
- Chandra Prakash Gajurel a.k.a. CP Gajurel - Politician
- Haribol Prasad Gajurel - Politician, Former Minister of Agriculture and Livestock Development
- Krishna Prasad Koirala - Founder of politically prominent Koirala family, Father of Matrika, BP and Girija Prasad Koirala
- Prof. Dr. Krishnahari Baral - Lyricist, Poet and Professor at Tribhuvan University
- Bhojraj Kafle - Lyricist and Singer
- Suresh Raj Sharma - Educationalist and founder Vice-chancellor of Kathmandu University
