= Hayu =

Tribe in Nepal

The Hayus (Nepali: हायु) are a member of the Janajati tribe speaking their own language, Wayu or Hayu. Little is known about them. They are mostly Hindus by religion. According to the 2001 Nepal census, there are 1821 Hayu in the country, of which 70.29% were Hindus and 23.61% were animists.

The Hayu language has been documented by the linguist Boyd Michailovsky. The language currently appears in Wikipedia as 'Vayu'.
