= Majhi language =

Indo-Aryan language of Nepal

Majhi
- The word "Majhi" written in Devanagari script
- Region: Nepal
- Ethnicity: Majhi people
- Native speakers: 24,000 (2011)
- Language family: Indo-European: Indo-Iranian; Indo-Aryan; Eastern; Bihari; Tharu; Majhi
- Writing system: Devanagari

Language codes
- ISO 639-3: mjz
- Glottolog: majh1253
- ELP: Majhi

Majhi is an Indo-Aryan language spoken in parts of Nepal and formerly in some small pockets of neighboring India.^{:1} The language is associated with the Majhi people, an ethnic group in those regions who dwell historically near the Saptakoshi River and its tributaries and elsewhere in central and eastern Nepal. The Majhi people generally subsist off of work associated with rivers, including fishing and ferrying.^{:2} Majhi is written using the Devanagari writing system.

Ethnologue classifies Mahji as a 6b threatened language. There are roughly 24,400 L1 speakers of Majhi in Nepal and roughly 46,120 L1 and L2 speakers of the language around the globe. Most of the Majhi speakers in Nepal are bilingual with the more predominant Nepali language,^{:2} and the latter language is replacing Majhi in use. Majhi's lack of official status, use in education, in media, in print, etc. places the survival of the language in a precarious position.^{:2}

The last speaker in India, Thak Bahadur Majhi of Jorethang in Sikkim state, died in 2016.

== Phonology ==
=== Vowels ===
Majhi has a total of 13 vowels, five of which are diphthongs.^{:6, 8}

	Front	Central	Back
High	i		u
High-mid	e		o
Low-mid		ə əː	
Low		a aː	

N.B. Diphthongs in Majhi include: eu, əu, au, əi, oi.^{:8} The vowels /ɜː, a_{c}ː/ do not occur anywhere except in the word-final position while other vowels can appear in any position in a word.^{:7}

=== Consonants ===
Majhi has a total of 29 consonants.^{:9}

		Bilabial	Dental	Alveolar	Retroflex	Palatal	Velar	Glottal
Nasal		m		n			ŋ	
Plosive/ Affricate	voiceless	p	t	ts	ʈ		k	
Plosive/ Affricate	aspirated	pʰ	tʰ	tsʰ	ʈʰ		kʰ	
Plosive/ Affricate	voiced	b	d	dz	ɖ		g	
Plosive/ Affricate	breathy	bʱ	dʱ	dzʱ	ɖʱ		gʱ	
Fricative				s				h
Liquid	lateral			l				
Liquid	rhotic			r				
Glide		w				j		

=== Syllable structure ===
Majhi allows consonant clusters to form in the onset but not the coda. However, researchers believe that further study on syllable structure is necessary to ascertain a fuller understanding of the syllable structure.^{:17} When Majhi features two consonants in the onset, the second consonant will be a glide (/j, w/).^{:13} Some examples of the syllable structure are included in the chart below.

Pattern	Example	Translation
CVC	nun	'salt'
CCV	hje	'this'
CCVC	sjal	'jackal'
CV	ṭe.ṭhi	'niece'^{:17}

== Morphology ==
=== Affixation ===
==== Derivational affixation ====
Majhi uses affixation to derive words through nominalization, verbalization, and negation. For nominalizers and verbalizers, Majhi uses suffixation. For negation, Majhi uses prefixation. Examples are included in the chart below.

	Example 1^{:19}	Example 2^{:58}	Example 3^{:58}	Example 4^{:70}
Function	Nominalizer (from verb)	Verbalizer (from noun)	Verbalizer (from adjective)	Negator (noun to noun)
Majhi	hiṭh-ai walk-NMZ 'the walking'	nid-ai sleep-VBZ 'to be asleep'	moṭ-ai fat-VBZ 'to be fat'	dzun-bal PROH-speak.IMP 'don't speak'

==== Inflectional affixation ====
Majhi uses morphemes to inflect words (specifically, to decline nouns and to conjugate verbs). Nouns are declined for case, number, and gender. Nouns are also declined for pronominal possessive suffixes, which indicate the possessor of the noun (see example below).^{:43} Verbs are conjugated for person, number, tense, aspect, and mood.^{:89}

	Example 1^{:21}	Example 2^{:19}	Example 3^{:48}
Function	Noun declension	Noun declension (with pronominal possessive suffix)	Verb conjugation
Majhi	bari-ka field-LOC 'in the field'	buhari-r daughter-in-law-POSS.2SG 'your daughter-in-law'	siddha-naĩ finish-PST.1SG 'I finished'

=== Other morphological processes ===
==== Compounding ====
Majhi can form new words by combining two roots. In the example below, combining the words for grandfather and grandmother yields the plural grandparents.^{:22}

First Root	Second Root	Combined New Word
adze	adza	adzeadza
'grandfather'	'grandmother'	'grandparents'

==== Reduplication ====
Majhi sometimes completely reduplicates a full noun, verb, adjective, or adverb form in order to add extra emphasis. For nouns, Majhi also adds a suffix "-e" to the first instance of the noun. For example, the noun "kapal" means 'head,' and, when it is reduplicated with the suffix as "kapal-e kapal," the combined phrase means 'all heads.'^{:20} Verbs do not have such a suffix. For example, the verb "bəl-ni" means 'I said,' but, when reduplicated "bəl-ni bəl-ni," the combined reduplication would mean 'I said it (which I will definitely not change).'^{:89} Adjectives can be reduplicated for emphasis in the same manner. For example, the adjective "lamo" means "long," and, when it is reduplicated as "lamo lmao," it means very long.^{:54} Adverbs can be reduplicated in the same manner as adjectives. For example, the adverb "tshiṭo" means 'quickly,' and, when it is reduplicated as "tshiṭo tshiṭo," it means 'very quickly.'^{:96}

=== Particles ===
Mahji features several particles that perform various functions, including indicating questions, emphasis, and hearsay.^{:73, 97} Mahji also shares some particles with Nepali.^{:97} Examples of some Mahji particles are given below.

==== Question particle te ====
The particle te comes at the end of a sentence and indicates a question.^{:97}

hək-lə pətshi keti kha-a-i te
become-PRF after what eat-CAUS-INF PRT
'After the child was born, what was fed to her?'

==== Contrastive, emphatic particle ta ====
Mahji uses the particle ta in order to provide an emphatic contrast.^{:97}

muĩ ta dzainai
I PRT go-PST.1SG
'Now I go (as for me)."

==== Hearsay particle ni ====
Mahji uses the hearsay particle ni to indicate an uncertain secondhand knowledge.^{:73}

keṭo a-le ni
boy come-PST.3SG HS
'The boy came (they say).'

== Syntax ==
=== Standard word order ===
The basic word order of Majhi is SOV.^{:111} This word order is fairly consistent across the language. Mahji is an in situ language for wh-questions and yes-no questions, meaning that it maintains its standard word order for questions.^{:118} The three examples below illustrate this word order:

Declarative sentence^{:85}

ram-in kam sək-le
Ram-ERG work finish-PST.3SG
Subject Object Verb
'Ram finished the work.'

Wh-question^{:119}

tui kətte mun kha-tshəs
you how-much liquor eat-NPST.2SG
Subject Quantity Object Verb
'How much liquor do you drink?'

Yes–no question^{:120}

Subject Object Verb
hoi-nin gai ban-le
he-ERG cow tie-PST
'Did he tie the cow?'

=== Noun phrases and adpositional phrases ===
==== Possessee + possessor ====
With the possessee + possessor relationship (genitive modifiers), the possessor precedes the possessee.^{:105}

bãs-kərə tsoja
bamboo-GEN splinter
'the splinter of bamboo'

==== Adposition + noun phrase ====
Majhi uses adpositions as analytical rather than synthetic markers.^{:28} In the example below, the noun phrase also appears with a specific case (the genitive case) with this postposition.^{:29}

kaṭh-kərə lagi
wood-GEN for
'for wood'

=== Adverb placement ===
In Mahji, the adverb generally precedes the verb. For example, see below.^{:96}

hoi-nin bhərkhər kətha sun-le
He-ERG recently story heard-PST.3SG
Subject Adverb Object Verb
'He has recently heard the story.'
