= Magar language =

Sino-Tibetan language of Nepal, Bhutan and India

Magar
- मगर ढुट (Magar ḍhuṭ)
- Native to: Nepal, India
- Region: Nepal; significant communities in Bhutan; Sikkim; Assam and Darjeeling district of India
- Ethnicity: 2.0 million Magar (2021 census of Nepal)
- Native speakers: (810,000 cited 2001–2006)
- Language family: Sino-Tibetan: Tibeto-Burman; Himalayish; Mahakiranti; Magaric; Magar
- Writing system: Akkha script (official), Devanagari, Latin script

Official status
- Official language in: Nepal: Gandaki Province; Lumbini Province; India: Sikkim

Language codes
- ISO 639-3: mgp – inclusive code Individual code: mrd – Western Magar (retired)
- Glottolog: maga1261
- Most spoken languages in Nepal. Magar in 20.

Magar Dhut (Nepali: मगर ढुट, romanized: Magar ḍhuṭ, Nepali: [ɖʱuʈ]) is a Sino-Tibetan language spoken mainly in Nepal, southern Bhutan, and in Darjeeling, Assam and Sikkim, India, by the Magar people. It is divided into two groups (Eastern and Western) and further dialect divisions give distinct tribal identity. In Nepal 810,000 people speak the language.

It is recognized as an official language in the Nepali province of Gandaki along with Gurung and Bhojpuri. And in Lumbini Province.

While the government of Nepal developed Magar language curricula, as provisioned by the constitution, the teaching materials have never successfully reached Magar schools, where most school instruction is in the Nepali language. It is not unusual for groups with their own language to feel that the "mother-tongue" is an essential part of their identity.

The Dhut Magar language is sometimes lumped with the Magar Kham language spoken further west in Bheri, Dhaulagiri, and Rapti zones. Although the two languages share many common words, they have major structural differences and are not mutually intelligible.

== Geographical distribution ==
=== Western Magar ===
Western Magar (dialects: Palpa and Syangja) is spoken in the following districts of Nepal (Ethnologue).

- Lumbini Province: Palpa District
- Gandaki Province: Syangja District, and a small part of the Tanahun District (west of the Bagmati River)
- Small border area in Gandaki Province: Parbat District
- Scattered throughout Karnali Province: especially in Surkhet District, Jajarkot District, and Dailekh District

=== Eastern Magar ===
Eastern Magar (dialects: Gorkha, Nawalparasi, and Tanahu) is spoken in the following districts of Nepal (Ethnologue).

- Zone 1: central mountains of Nepal east of the Bagmati River
  - Gandaki Province: Tanahun District and southern Gorkha District
  - Lumbini Province: Palpa District Kapilvastu District and Nawalparasi District
  - Small border area in Bagmati Province: Dhading District
- Zone 2: eastern Nepal
  - Sindhuli District, Bagmati Province
  - Okhaldhunga District, Koshi Province
  - Udayapur District, Koshi Province
  - Scattered communities in central Koshi Province, Dhankuta District, Bhojpur and southern Koshi Province, Ilam District, Jhapa District
  - Southern Bhutan

=== India ===
- Sikkim (Magar language is one of the official languages)
- Darjeeling district and Kalimpong district of West Bengal
- Golaghat district, Sonitpur district and Tinsukia district districts of Assam
- Some parts of Manipur

== Phonology ==
=== Consonants ===
		Labial	Dental	Alveolar		Palatal	Velar	Glottal
		Labial	Dental	plain	sibilant	Palatal	Velar	Glottal
Stop	voiceless	p	t̪*	t	t͡s		k	(ʔ)
Stop	aspirated	pʰ	t̪ʰ*	tʰ	t͡sʰ		kʰ	
Stop	voiced	b	d̪*	d	d͡z		ɡ	
Stop	murmured	bʱ	d̪ʱ*	dʱ	d͡zʱ		ɡʱ	
Fricative	voiceless				s			h
Fricative	voiced							ɦ
Nasal	voiced	m		n			ŋ	
Nasal	murmured	mʱ		nʱ			ŋʱ	
Lateral	voiced			l				
Lateral	murmured			lʱ				
Approximant	voiced	w		ɹ		j		
Approximant	murmured	wʱ		ɹʱ		jʱ		

*-only occur in the Tanahu dialect.

/ʔ/ is only a marginal phoneme.

Phoneme	Allophones
/p/	[p̚]
/pʰ/	[ɸ]
/t/	[tʲ], [t̚], [ʈ]
/tʰ/	[θ]
/d/	[dʲ], [ɖ], [ɽ]
/k/	[kʲ], [k̚]
/kʰ/	[x]
/ɡ/	[ɡʲ]
/t͡s/	[t͡ʃ]
/t͡sʰ/	[t͡ʃʰ]
/dz/	[dʒ]
/d͡zʱ/	[d͡ʒʱ]
/s/	[ʃ]
/h/	[ɦ]
/n/	[nʲ]
/ŋ/	[ŋʲ]

=== Vowels ===
	Front	Central	Back
Close	i		u
Mid	e		o
Mid			ʌ
Open		a	

Diphthongs
/ia/
/iu/
/ei/
/eu/
/aɪ/
/au/
/oi/

Phoneme	Allophones
/i/	[i] [ɪ] [i̤] [i̤ː] [ĩ]
/e/	[e] [ɛ] [ẽ] [e̤] [e̤ː]
/a/	[ä] [æ] [ä̃] [äˑ] [ä̤] [ä̤ː]
/u/	[u] [ʊ] [u̟] [ṳ] [ṳː] [ũ]
/ʌ/	[ʌ] [ə] [ə̃] [ʌ̤] [ʌ̃]
/o/	[o] [o̟] [õ] [oˑ] [o̤] [o̤ː]
