= Khandadevi Rural Municipality =

Khandadevi (RM) खाँडादेवी गाउँपालिका
- Rural Municipality
- Location Khandadevi (RM) (Nepal)
- Coordinates: 27°28′47″N 85°56′17″E
- Country: Nepal
- Province: Bagmati
- District: Ramechhap District
- Wards: 9
- Established: 10 March 2017

Government
  - Type: Rural Council
  - Chairperson: Mr. Prem B. Tamang
  - Vice-chairperson: Mrs. Makhmali Shrestha
  - Term of office: (2017 - 2022)

Area
  - Total: 150.7 km^{2} (58.2 sq mi)

Population (2011)
  - Total: 25,761
  - Density: 170.9/km^{2} (442.7/sq mi)
- Time zone: UTC+5:45 (Nepal Standard Time)
- Headquarter: Makadum
- Website: khandadevimun.gov.np

Khandadevi is a Rural municipality located within the Ramechhap District of the Bagmati Province of Nepal. The municipality spans 150.7 square kilometres (58.2 sq mi) of area, with a total population of 25,761 according to a 2011 Nepal census.

On March 10, 2017, the Government of Nepal restructured the local level bodies into 753 new local level structures. The previous Rakathum, Majhuwa, Bhirpani, Pakarbas, Makadum and Khandadevi, Gagalbhadaure and Piukhuri VDCs were merged to form Khandadevi Rural Municipality. Khandadevi is divided into 7 wards, with Tokarpur declared the administrative center of the rural municipality.

== Demographics ==
At the time of the 2011 Nepal census, Khandadevi Rural Municipality had a population of 25,786. Of these, 51.9% spoke Nepali, 25.0% Tamang, 13.9% Newar, 3.3% Magar, 3.0% Majhi, 0.8% Thangmi, 0.1% Maithili and 0.1% other languages as their first language.

In terms of ethnicity/caste, 26.1% were Chhetri, 26.1% Tamang, 22.7% Newar, 7.2% Magar, 6.3% Majhi, 2.9% Kami, 2.6% Damai/Dholi, 2.3% Hill Brahmin, 1.2% Sarki, 0.8% Thami, 0.5% Sanyasi/Dasnami, 0.4% Gharti/Bhujel, 0.2% Pahari, 0.2% Sunuwar, 0.1% Badi, 0.1% Dhobi, 0.1% other Terai and 0.2% others.

In terms of religion, 70.1% were Hindu, 28.3% Buddhist, 0.9% Prakriti, 0.4% Christian and 0.4% others.

In terms of literacy, 61.6% could read and write, 4.2% could only read and 34.1% could neither read nor write.
