= Umakunda Rural Municipality =

Umakunda (RM) उमाकुण्ड गाउँपालिका
- Rural Municipality
- Location Umakunda (RM) (Nepal)
- Coordinates: 27°30′35″N 86°17′34″E
- Country: Nepal
- Province: Bagmati
- District: Ramechhap
- Wards: 7
- Established: 10 March 2017

Government
  - Type: Rural Council
  - Chairperson: Mr. Sher B. Sunuwar
  - Vice-chairperson: Mrs. Sabitri Sunuwar
  - Term of office: (2017 - 2022),(2023- Present)

Area
  - Total: 451.99 km^{2} (174.51 sq mi)

Population (2011)
  - Total: 17,601
  - Density: 38.941/km^{2} (100.86/sq mi)
- Time zone: UTC+5:45 (Nepal Standard Time)
- Headquarter: Priti
- Website: umakundamun.gov.np

Umakunda is a Rural municipality located within the Ramechhap District of the Bagmati Province of Nepal. The municipality spans 451.99 square kilometres (174.51 sq mi) of area, with a total population of 17,601 according to a 2011 Nepal census.

On March 10, 2017, the Government of Nepal restructured the local level bodies into 753 new local level structures. The previous Gumdel, Bamti Bhandar, Kubukasthali, Priti, Gupteshwar and Bhuji VDCs were merged to form Umakunda Rural Municipality. Umakunda is divided into 7 wards, with Priti declared the administrative center of the rural municipality.

== Demographics ==
At the time of the 2011 Nepal census, Umakunda Rural Municipality had a population of 17,647. Of these, 55.9% spoke Nepali, 20.2% Sunwar, 11.2% Sherpa, 7.1% Tamang, 4.0% Newar, 0.6% Magar, 0.3% Maithili, 0.2% Thangmi, 0.2% Rai, 0.1% Jirel and 0.1% other languages as their first language.

In terms of ethnicity/caste, 34.0% were Chhetri, 20.6% Sunuwar, 12.1% Sherpa, 9.6% Tamang, 7.5% Newar, 5.2% Kami, 3.5% Damai/Dholi, 2.2% Hill Brahmin, 1.4% Sarki, 1.2% Gharti/Bhujel, 1.2% Magar, 0.3% Thami, 0.2% Rai, 0.1% Badi, 0.1% Jirel, 0.1% Khawas, 0.1% other Terai and 0.5% others.

In terms of religion, 72.7% were Hindu, 21.6% Buddhist, 5.4% Christian, 0.2% Prakriti, 0.1% Kirati and 0.1% others.

In terms of literacy, 63.2% could read and write, 4.6% could only read and 32.2% could neither read nor write.
