= Likhutamakoshi Rural Municipality =

Likhu (RM) लिखु गाउँपालिका
- Rural Municipality
- Location Likhu (RM) (Nepal)
- Coordinates: 27°25′33″N 86°10′35″E
- Country: Nepal
- Province: Bagmati
- District: Ramechhap District
- Wards: 7
- Established: 10 March 2017

Government
  - Type: Rural Council
  - Chairperson: Mr. Keshab Mahat
  - Vice-chairperson: Mrs. Dipa Pakhrin
  - Term of office: (2022 - 2027)

Area
  - Total: 124.51 km^{2} (48.07 sq mi)

Population (2011)
  - Total: 23,109
  - Density: 185.60/km^{2} (480.70/sq mi)
- Time zone: UTC+5:45 (Nepal Standard Time)
- Headquarter: Bijulikot
- Website: likhumunramechhap.gov.np

Likhutamakoshi is a Rural municipality located within the Ramechhap District of the Bagmati Province of Nepal. The municipality spans 124.51 square kilometres (48.07 sq mi) of area, with a total population of 23,109 according to the 2011 Nepal census.

On March 10, 2017, the Government of Nepal restructured the local level bodies into 753 new local level structures. The previousDuragau, Saipu, Bijulikot, Nagdaha, Khimti and Tilpung VDCs were merged to form Likhutamakoshi Rural Municipality. Likhutamakoshi is divided into 7 wards, with Bijulikot declared the administrative center of the rural municipality.

== Demographics ==
At the time of the 2011 Nepal census, Likhutamakoshi Rural Municipality had a population of 23,135. Of these, 56.6% spoke Nepali, 23.1% Tamang, 7.1% Magar, 6.4% Sunwar, 4.3% Newar, 0.9% Yolmo, 0.3% Majhi, 0.2% Gurung, 0.1% Maithili, 0.1% Sherpa, 0.1% Tharu and 0.1% other languages as their first language.

In terms of ethnicity/caste, 31.8% were Chhetri, 23.6% Tamang, 10.3% Magar, 10.1% Newar, 6.5% Sunuwar, 5.5% Hill Brahmin, 3.2% Kami, 2.7% Sarki, 2.0% Damai/Dholi, 1.7% Gharti/Bhujel, 0.9% Yolmo, 0.4% Sanyasi/Dasnami, 0.3% Badi, 0.3% Gurung, 0.3% Majhi, 0.2% Tharu, 0.1% Sherpa and 0.2% others.

In terms of religion, 70.7% were Hindu, 26.0% Buddhist, 2.4% Christian, 0.3% Bon and 0.6% others.

In terms of literacy, 63.9% could read and write, 3.9% could only read and 32.0% could neither read nor write.
