= Doramba Rural Municipality =

Doramba (RM) दोरम्बा गाउँपालिका
- Rural Municipality
- Location Doramba (RM) (Nepal)
- Coordinates: 27°32′22″N 85°55′19″E
- Country: Nepal
- Province: Bagmati
- District: Ramechhap District
- Wards: 7
- Established: 10 March 2017

Government
  - Type: Rural Council
  - Chairperson: Mr. Kaman Sing Tamang
  - Vice-chairperson: Mrs. Krishla Ghising
  - Term of office: (2017 - 2022)

Area
  - Total: 140.88 km^{2} (54.39 sq mi)

Population (2011)
  - Total: 22,738
  - Density: 161.40/km^{2} (418.02/sq mi)
- Time zone: UTC+5:45 (Nepal Standard Time)
- Headquarter: Tokarpur
- Website: dorambamun.gov.np

Doramba is a Rural municipality located within the Ramechhap District of the Bagmati Province of Nepal. The municipality spans 140.88 square kilometres (54.39 sq mi) of area, with a total population of 22,738 according to a 2011 Nepal census.

On March 10, 2017, the Government of Nepal restructured the local level bodies into 753 new local level structures. The previous Dadhuwa, Doramba, Tokarpur, Goshwara, Gunsi Bhadaure and Lakhanpur VDCs were merged to form Doramba Rural Municipality. Doramba is divided into 7 wards, with Tokarpur declared the administrative center of the rural municipality.

== Demographics ==
At the time of the 2011 Nepal census, Doramba Rural Municipality had a population of 22,773. Of these, 51.9% spoke Nepali, 29.4% Tamang, 7.8% Thangmi, 4.9% Magar, 3.5% Newar, 1.4% Pahari, 0.7% Sherpa, 0.1% Maithili and 0.1% other languages as their first language.

In terms of ethnicity/caste, 29.6% were Tamang, 24.9% Magar, 14.9% Newar, 7.8% Thami, 6.9% Hill Brahmin, 5.2% Chhetri, 4.3% Kami, 2.4% Sarki, 1.5% Pahari, 1.3% Damai/Dholi, 0.7% Sherpa, 0.2% Badi and 0.4% others.

In terms of religion, 46.3% were Buddhist, 43.2% Hindu, 9.2% Prakriti, 1.0% Christian and 0.3% others.

In terms of literacy, 54.0% could read and write, 4.2% could only read and 41.7% could neither read nor write.
