= Sunapati Rural Municipality =

Sunapati (RM) सुनापति गाउँपालिका
- Rural Municipality
- Location Sunapati (RM) (Nepal)
- Coordinates: 27°29′39″N 85°51′50″E
- Country: Nepal
- Province: Bagmati
- District: Ramechhap District
- Wards: 5
- Established: 10 March 2017

Government
  - Type: Rural Council
  - Chairperson: Mr.Thulo kanchha Tamang
  - Vice-chairperson: Mrs. Gita Bist Chaulagai
  - Term of office: (2017 - 2022)

Area
  - Total: 86.91 km^{2} (33.56 sq mi)

Population (2011)
  - Total: 18,141
  - Density: 208.7/km^{2} (540.6/sq mi)
- Time zone: UTC+5:45 (Nepal Standard Time)
- Headquarter: Hiledevi
- Website: sunapatimun.gov.np

Sunapati is a Rural municipality located within the Ramechhap District of the Bagmati Province of Nepal. The municipality spans 86.98 square kilometres (33.58 sq mi) of area, with a total population of 18,141 according to a 2011 Nepal census.

On March 10, 2017, the Government of Nepal restructured the local level bodies into 753 new local level structures. The previous Dimipokhari, Hiledevi, Bethan, Khaniyapani and small portion of Gunsi Bhadaure VDCs were merged to form Sunapati Rural Municipality. Sunapati is divided into 5 wards, with Hiledevi declared the administrative center of the rural municipality.

== Demographics ==
At the time of the 2011 Nepal census, Sunapati Rural Municipality had a population of 18,148. Of these, 52.6% spoke Nepali, 34.6% Tamang, 11.2% Newar, 0.6% Majhi, 0.4% Magar, 0.3% Doteli, 0.1% Maithili, 0.1% Yolmo and 0.2% other languages as their first language.

In terms of ethnicity/caste, 34.9% were Tamang, 20.1% Chhetri, 17.3% Newar, 9.4% Hill Brahmin, 9.2% Magar, 2.5% Kami, 2.1% Damai/Dholi, 2.0% Majhi, 1.0% Sarki, 0.7% Gharti/Bhujel, 0.4% other Dalit, 0.2% Pahari, 0.1% Badi, 0.1% Yolmo and 0.2% others.

In terms of religion, 63.7% were Hindu, 35.3% Buddhist, 0.7% Christian and 0.2% others.

In terms of literacy, 58.7% could read and write, 3.4% could only read and 37.8% could neither read nor write.
