= Likhu =

Likhu may refer to:

- Likhu Khola, a left tributary of the Sun Koshi in the Himalayas in eastern Nepal

== Rural Municipalities in Nepal ==
- Likhu, Okhaldhunga, a rural municipality in Okhaldhunga District of Province No. 1 of Nepal
- Likhu Pike, a rural municipality in Solukhumbu District of Province No. 1 of Nepal
- Likhu, Nuwakot, a rural municipality in Nuwakot District of Bagmati Province of Nepal
- Likhu Tamakoshi, a rural municipality in Ramechhap District of Bagmati Province of Nepal

== Former village development committee ==
- Likhu, Karnali, a village development committee in Dolpa District in the Karnali Zone of north-western Nepal
- Likhu, Bagmati, a village development committee in Nuwakot District in the Bagmati Zone of central Nepal
