= Gokulganga Rural Municipality =

Rural municipality in Bagmati Province, Nepal

Gokulganga गोकुलगंगा गाउँपालिका
- Rural municipality
- Location in Nepal Gokulganga (Nepal)
- Coordinates: 27°32′59″N 86°11′59″E
- Country: Nepal
- Region: Central
- District: Ramechhap District
- Province: Bagmati Province
- Established: 10 March 2017

Government
  - Type: Rural council
  - Chairperson: Kaji Bahadur Khadka (Nepali Congress)
  - Deputy Chairperson: Usha Devi Karki
  - Former Chairperson: Khadga Bahadur Sunuwar
  - Former Vice Chairperson: Radhika Shrestha(Newar)

Area
  - Total: 198.4 km^{2} (76.6 sq mi)

Population (2011 Nepal census)
  - Total: 20,074
  - Density: 101.2/km^{2} (262.1/sq mi)
  - Ethnicities: Sunuwar Newar Bahun Chhetri Magar Tamang Sherpa
- Time zone: UTC+5:45 (Nepal Time)
- Postal code: 45400
- Area code: 048
- Website: gokulgangamun.gov.np

Gokulganga Rural Municipality (Nepali: गोकुलगंगा गाउँपालिका) is a Rural municipality in Ramechhap District of Bagmati Province in Nepal.

== Demographics ==
At the time of the 2011 Nepal census, Gokulganga Rural Municipality had a population of 20,074. Of these, 69.5% spoke Nepali, 11.0% Tamang, 9.9% Sunuwar, 5.5% Sherpa, 2.4% Yolmo, 1.1% Newar, 0.1% Maithili, 0.1% Rai and 0.1% other languages as their first language.

In terms of ethnicity/caste, 42.7% were Chhetri, 14.3% Tamang, 10.7% Sunuwar, 8.1% Sherpa, 3.9% Hill Brahmin, 3.8% Gharti/Bhujel, 3.4% Sarki, 3.3% Newar, 2.6% Kami, 2.4% Yolmo, 1.8% Damai/Dholi, 1.4% Magar, 0.8% Gurung, 0.2% Sanyasi/Dasnami, 0.1% other Dalit, 0.1% Rai, 0.1% Yadav and 0.3% others.

In terms of religion, 71.3% were Hindu, 24.9% Buddhist, 3.5% Christian and 0.3% others.

In terms of literacy, 65.0% could read and write, 3.3% could only read and 31.6% could neither read nor write.
