= Dhyaurali =

Coordinates: 27°37′N 84°13′E

Dhyaurali ध्यौराली
- Village development committee
- Interactive map of Dhyaurali
- Country: Nepal
- Zone: Janakpur Zone
- District: Ramechhap District

Population (1991)
  - Total: 3,111
- Time zone: UTC+5:45 (Nepal Time)

Dhyaurali is a village development committee in Ramechhap District in the Janakpur Zone of north-eastern Nepal. At the time of the 1991 Nepal census it had a population of 3,111 people living in 616 individual households.
