= Bhadaure =

Bhadaure may refer to:

- Bhadaure, Janakpur, Nepal
- Bhadaure, Sagarmatha, Nepal
