= Wapti =

Wapti वाप्ती
- Village development committee
- Country: Nepal
- Zone: Janakpur Zone
- District: Ramechhap District

Population (1991)
  - Total: 3,015
- Time zone: UTC+5:45 (Nepal Time)

Wapti is a village development committee in Ramechhap District in the Janakpur Zone of north-eastern Nepal. At the time of the 1991 Nepal census it had a population of 3,015 people living in 602 individual households.
