= Those =

Those may refer to:

- those, plural English distal demonstrative (the plural of the word that)
- Those, Nepal
