= Rasanalu =

Rasnalu रस्नालु GHUI Dada tabe forest
- Village development committee
- Location in Nepal
- Coordinates: 27.56°N 86.22°E
- Country: Nepal
- Zone: Janakpur Zone
- District: Ramechhap District

Population (1991)
  - Total: 4,424
- Time zone: UTC+5:45 (Nepal Time)

Rasanalu is a village development committee in Ramechhap District in the Janakpur Zone of north-eastern Nepal. According to the 1991 Nepal census it had a population of 3,833 people living in 797 individual households.

Rasnalu village lies between Those and Betali. The village has iron, copper, and stone mines. The castes living there include Sunuwar, Tamang, Bhote, Karki, Damaai, Kami, Bhujel, Thami and Shrestha. The village relies on agriculture and farming. Rice, potatoes, tea, wheat, dal, and maize are grown.
