= Bhuji =

Bhujee / Bhuji भुजी Ward No. 7 Bujj बुज
- Rural Municipality
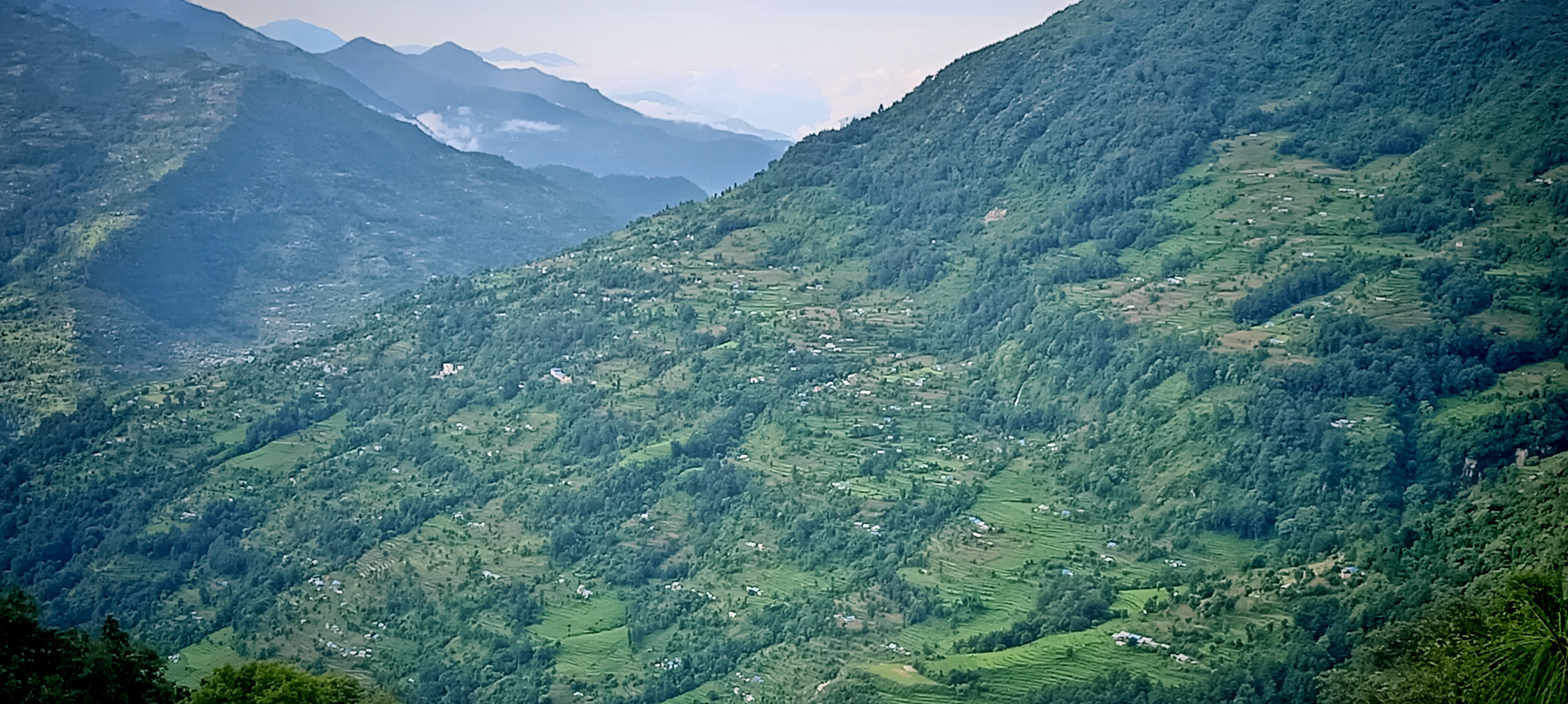
- Umakunda-7, Bhujee Ramechhap

- Location in Nepal
- Coordinates: 27.48°N 86.28°E
- Country: Nepal
- Region: Central Development Region (formerly)
- Province: Bagmati
- Zone: Janakpur (formerly)
- District: Ramechhap
- Municipality: Umakunda Rural Municipality
- Established: 27 March 2017

Government
  - Type: Elected Official
  - Ward Chairman: Rudra Newar
  - Term of office: (2017 - 2022), (2022 - present)

Area
  - Total: 18.48 km^{2} (7.14 sq mi)

Population (2021)
  - Total: 3,900+
  - Density: 211/km^{2} (550/sq mi)

language
  - Official: Nepali
  - Local: Sunuwar, Newar
- Time zone: UTC+5:45 (Nepal Time)
- Postal code: 45402
- Area code: 48
- TikTok: tiktok.com/@bhujee
- Website: facebook.com/BhujeeRamechhap

Bhuji/Bhujee is ward 7 in Umakunda Rural Municipality/उमाकुण्ड गाउँपालिका. It sits in Ramechhap District in the Janakpur Zone in the Bagmati Province of north-eastern Nepal. As of the 2021 Nepal census it had a population of 3900+, living in 701 households.

== Demographics ==
Around 80 percent are Sunuwar/सुऩुवाऱ/मुखीय.

== Economy ==
They depend on agriculture. Some work in the British Army (BGA); Indian Army (IGA); Gurkha Contingent Singapore Police Force (GCSPF). Others work in Gulf countries.

== Education ==
Bhuji has Kasthem Secondary School, which covers up to 10 class SEE then SLC. Its two primary level schools are Thinkepu Ni.Ma.Bi and Dilkharka Ni.Ma.Bi and one Thinkepu pre-primary school.

=== Schools ===
- Kasthem Secondary School
- Thinkepu Lower Secondary School

== Facilities ==
Bhujee Health Post Centre is the area's major Health Centre and is located at Poldim.

The administrative office is located at Koldanda.

== Culture ==
Bhuji has its own stories and legends.

It gained awareness due to the Bhujee League football tournament. It was started in the year 2055 BS (1998 AD). The competition was canceled in some years from 2055-2067 BS. In 2068 BS (2011 AD) the competition was renamed as Bhujee League, and continued every year thereafter. The competition gained popularity and attracted players from different villages and from other cities.
