= Daragaun =

Duragaun दुरागाउँ
- Village development committee
- Country: Nepal
- Zone: Janakpur Zone
- District: Ramechhap District

Population (1991)
  - Total: 2,986
- Time zone: UTC+5:45 (Nepal Time)

Duragaun is a village development committee in Ramechhap District in the Janakpur Zone of north-eastern Nepal. At the time of the 1991 Nepal census it had a population of 2,986 people living in 676 individual households.
