= Deurali, Ramechhap =

Deurali, Ramechhap देउराली
- Village development committee
- Location in Nepal
- Coordinates: 27.37°N 86.18°E
- Country: Nepal
- Zone: Janakpur Zone
- District: Ramechhap District

Population (1991)
  - Total: 3,459
- Time zone: UTC+5:45 (Nepal Time)

Deurali, Ramechhap is a village development committee in Ramechhap District in the Janakpur Zone of north-eastern Nepal. At the time of the 1991 Nepal census it had a population of 3,459.
