= Pharpu =

Pharpu फर्पु
- Village development committee
- Location in Nepal
- Coordinates: 27°29′N 86°09′E
- Country: Nepal
- Zone: Janakpur Zone
- District: Ramechhap District

Population (1991)
  - Total: 1,956
- Time zone: UTC+5:45 (Nepal Time)

Pharpu is a village development committee in Ramechhap District in the Janakpur Zone of north-eastern Nepal. At the time of the 1991 Nepal census it had a population of 1,956 people living in 376 individual households.
