= Gelu, Nepal =

Gelu, Nepal गेलु
- Village development committee
- Location in Nepal
- Coordinates: 27.45°N 86.08°E
- Country: Nepal
- Zone: Janakpur Zone
- District: Ramechhap District

Population (1991)
  - Total: 5,496
- Time zone: UTC+5:45 (Nepal Time)

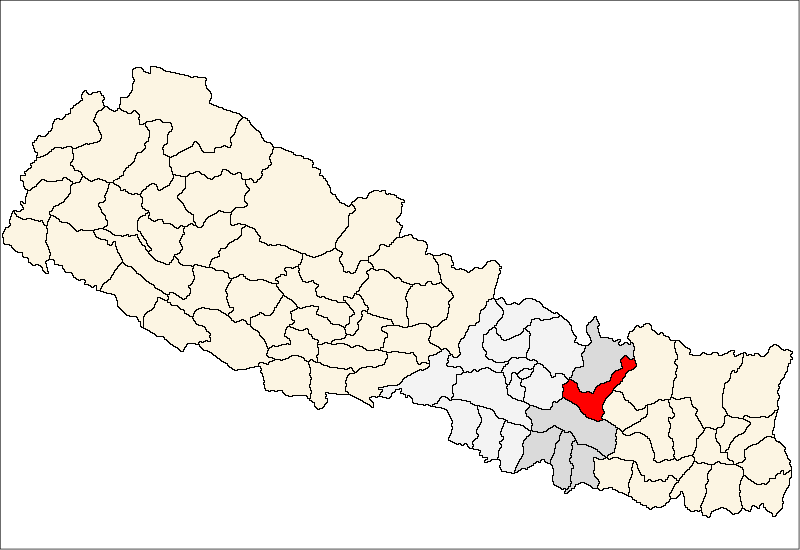
map of Ramechhap District in Nepal.

Gelu, Nepal is a village development committee in Ramechhap District in the Janakpur Zone of north-eastern Nepal. At the time of the 1991 Nepal census it had a population of 5,496 people living in 995 individual households.
