= Dimipokhari =

Dimipokhari, दिमिपोखरी
- Location in Nepal
- Coordinates: 27.51°N 85.90°E
- Country: Nepal
- Zone: Janakpur Zone
- Province No.: 3
- District: Ramechhap District
- Rural Municipality: Sunapati Rural Municipality
- Ward No.: 2

Population (1991)
  - Total: 2,997
- Time zone: UTC+5:45 (Nepal Time)

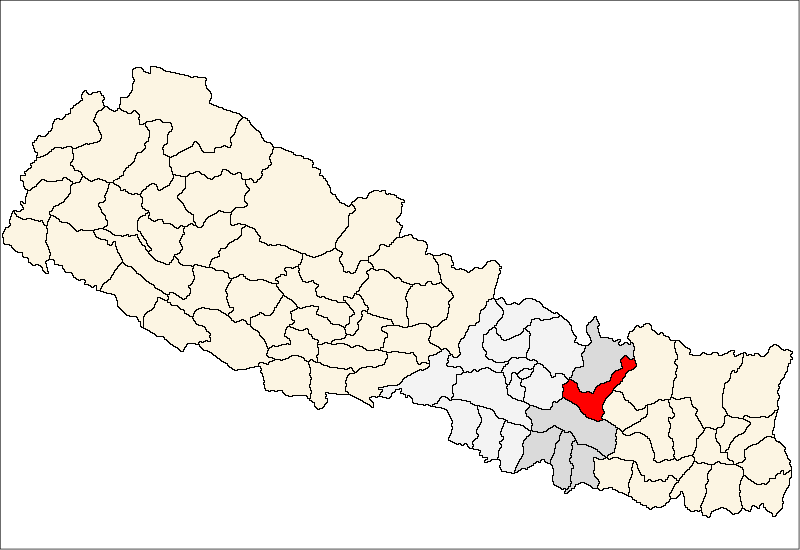
Location of Ramechhap District within Nepal

Dimipokhari is a 2 no. Ward of Sunapati Rural Municipality in Ramechhap District which falls under 3 no. province of Nepal.It is located at north-eastern Nepal. At the time of the 1991 Nepal census it had a population of 2,997 people living in 626 individual households.
