= Chanakhu =

Chanakhu चनखु
- Village development committee
- Location in Nepal
- Coordinates: 27.45°N 86.05°E
- Country: Nepal
- Zone: Janakpur Zone
- District: Ramechhap District

Population (1991)
  - Total: 2,359
- Time zone: UTC+5:45 (Nepal Time)

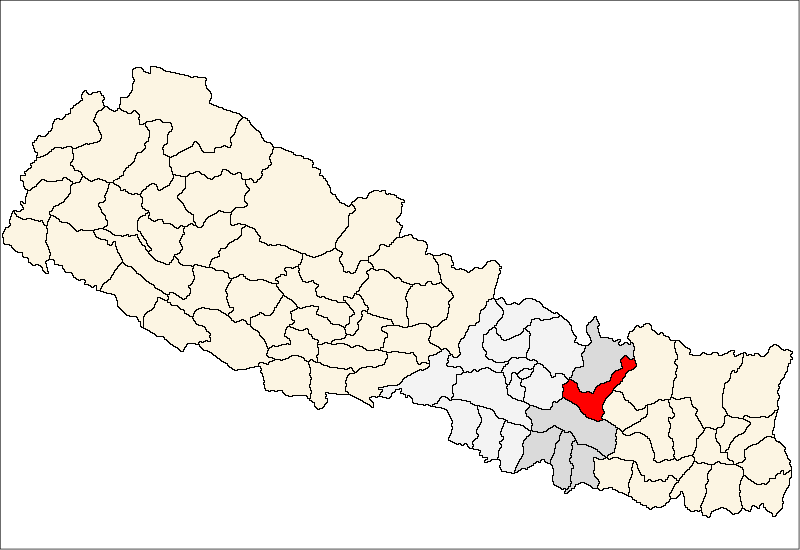
Location map of the Ramechhap District, Nepal

Chanakhu is a village development committee in Ramechhap District in the Janakpur Zone of north-eastern Nepal. At the time of the 1991 Nepal census it had a population of 2,359 people living in 451 individual households.
