= Doramba =

Doramba दोरम्बा
- Ward
- Location in Nepal
- Coordinates: 27.53°N 85.94°E
- Country: Nepal
- Province: Bagmati Province
- District: Ramechhap District
- Rural Municipality: Doramba Rural Municipality
- Ward No.: 2
- Established as a VDC: 1990
- Established as a ward: 2017

Government
  - Type: Ward council

Area
  - Total: 20.4 km^{2} (7.9 sq mi)

Population (2011)
  - Total: 3,723
  - Density: 182/km^{2} (473/sq mi)
- Time zone: UTC+5:45 (Nepal Time)

Doramba is a populated place and a ward (ward no. 2) of Doramba Rural Municipality. It was a village development committee before 10 March 2017. At the time of the 1991 Nepal census it had a population of 3,640 people living in 664 individual households.

On 10 March 2017, local level body of Nepal restructured into 753 units, thus this local level unit merged with other VDCs to form Doramba Rural Municipality. Now total area of this ward is 20.4 square kilometres (7.9 sq mi) and total population (2011 Nepal census) is 3,273.
