= Khandadevi =

Khandadevi खाँडादेवी
- Ward
- Location in Nepal
- Coordinates: 27.4622°N 85.9277°E
- Country: Nepal
- Province: Bagmati Province
- District: Ramechhap District
- Rural Municipality: Khandadevi Rural Municipality
- Ward No.: 7
- Established as a VDC: 1990
- Established as a ward: 2017

Government
  - Type: Ward council
  - Ward Chairperson: Mr. Asal Sing Tamang

Area
  - Total: 21.34 km^{2} (8.24 sq mi)

Population (2011)
  - Total: 3,925
  - Density: 183.9/km^{2} (476.4/sq mi)
- Time zone: UTC+5:45 (Nepal Time)

Khandadevi is a populated place and a ward (ward no. 7) of Khandadevi Rural Municipality. It was a village development committee before 10 March 2017. At the time of the 1991 Nepal census it had a population of 3,751 people living in 650 individual households.

On 10 March 2017, local level body of Nepal restructured into 753 units, thus this local level unit merged with other VDCs to form Khandadevi Rural Municipality. Now total area of this ward is 21.34 square kilometres (8.24 sq mi) and total population (2011 Nepal census) is 3,925.
