= Parbatipur, Nepal =

Parbatipur पार्बतीपुर
- Municipality
- Nicknames: हाम्रो पार्बतिपुर,राम्रो पार्बतिपुर
- Location in Nepal
- Coordinates: 27.60°N 84.33°E
- Country: Nepal
- Zone: Narayani Zone
- District: Chitwan District

Population (2011)
  - Total: 6,506
- Time zone: UTC+5:45 (Nepal Time)

Parbatipur is a part of Bharatpur Metropolitan City-21 in Chitwan District in Bagmati Province of southern Nepal. At the time of the 2011 Nepal census it had a population of 6506 people living in 1614 individual households. Though the status of the settlement has not been announced publicly, the official fees and taxes are applied by Metropolitan City standard/rate. Parbatipur Town is only 18 km far from its district capital Bharatpur. It is one of the fastest-growing towns of West Chitwan.

Parbatipur Town centre is considered one of the cleanest town centres in Nepal. Town centre provided services are Government Office, schools, hardware stores, catering services, video and photo studios, electronic and electric appliances, cosmetics, beauty parlours, salons, workshop garage, cafes, motels, Internet cybers, metal works, police station, etc.the major school of parbatipur is annapurna secondary school.paradise English school and sunlight English school are privates schools.

== Wards ==
In the past, the wards referred to particularly a village of a Parbatipur VDC. There were 9 wards in Parbatipur VDC then. They were: East Rangila, West Rangila, Paharilotar, Ratanpur, East Kanchanbasti, Sitapur, West Kanchanbasti, and Parbatipur. Now it is ward number 21 of Bharatpur municipality.

== Sports ==
In Parbatipur there are several sports played – notably football, volleyball and cricket. There are seven local football clubs in Parbatipur. Each of them belongs to their respective wards of Parbatipur Municipality. They are:

- Paharilotar Football Club
- Parvatipur Youth Club
- Sitapur Football Club
- Kanchanbasti Football Club
- Rangila Youth Club
- Ratanpur Football Club
- Dev Nagar Football Club

== Attractions ==
The major attractions of Parbatipur is its cultural programme which is held every year, and the Annual Intermunicipality football competition held in the football ground of East Parbatipur. Many supporters from all over the Chitwan come to Parbatipur to support their respective clubs.

== Culture ==
Parbatipur is rich in culture as people from different ethnic backgrounds live in harmony, Common religions found here are Hinduism, Muslim, Buddhism and Christianity.

== Occupations ==
Mostly the people are engaged in Animal husbandry and Agriculture. Poultry Farming is highly approached too. People sell the animal's milk to nearby Dairies. Apart from this people are also involved in many professions like teaching, banking etc.

== Transportation ==
Privately owned buses are the main means of transportation here, taxi service is not available here but you might get lucky if it is returning after the reservation drop. Most of the people here travel by privately owned vehicles like cars, motorbikes or bicycles. and most of people travel by public transport. Most common public transportation here include Mayuri, which is similar to taxi and Magic which is similar to microbus. Mayuri and Magic are local terms for the vehicles.

Education: Annapurna secondary school which was established as a primary school in 1960 AD ( 2016 B.S.)is the main academic institution of Prabatipur. This school was renowned in the area outside Parbatipur as well.
