= Rampur, Ramechhap =

Rampur रामपुर
- Village development committee
- Location in Nepal
- Coordinates: 27.27°N 86.17°E
- Country: Nepal
- Zone: Janakpur Zone
- District: Ramechhap District

Population (2001)
  - Total: 4,400
- Time zone: UTC+5:45 (Nepal Time)

Rampur is a village development committee in Ramechhap District in the Janakpur Zone of north-eastern Nepal. At the time of the 2001 Nepal census it had a population of 4,400 people living in 724 individual households.
