= Tilpung =

Tilpung तिल्पुङ
- Village development committee
- Location in Nepal
- Coordinates: 27.43°N 86.11°E
- Country: Nepal
- Zone: Janakpur Zone
- District: Ramechhap District

Population (1991)
  - Total: 3,511
- Time zone: UTC+5:45 (Nepal Time)

Tilpung is a village development committee in Ramechhap District in the Janakpur Zone of north-eastern Nepal. At the time of the 1991 Nepal census, it had a population of 3,511 people, living in 650 individual households.
