= Paharilotar =

Paharilotar पहारिलोटार
- Village
- Location in Nepal
- Coordinates: 27.60°N 84.33°E
- Country: Nepal
- Zone: Bagmati Province
- District: Chitwan District
- Municipality: Bharatpur Municipality

Population (2011)
  - Total: 1,547
- Time zone: UTC+5:45 (Nepal Time)
- Postal code: 44200
- Area code: 44200

Paharilotar (Nepali; पहारिलोटार) is the 9th Ward of Narayani Municipality. It was the largest village of Parbatipur VDC, Now it is suppressed in Narayani Municipality.It is located 2 km south of Parbatipur Town and 20 km from the district capital Bharatpur. Neighbouring villages include West Rangila, Padampokhari and Manipur.

== Transportation ==
Personally owned vehicles are the first choice of transportation in Paharilotar. Almost every family owns a motorbike; cars are less common. Public buses are also available.

== Religions ==
The majority of people are Hindu here. Few peoples are Buddhist. Many notable Hindu Temples are located here. Some Buddhist Monasteries are also located here.

== Education ==
Almost everyone in Paharilotar is literate. The educational campaign run by the Government Of Nepal has helped to raise the literacy rate. The main educational centre of the village is Shree Bhanu Secondary School. It offers education to students who pass their 10th grade in their own native village. Other Private Boarding Schools are also accessible easily at other villages.

== Occupation ==
Mostly the people are engaged in Animal husbandry and Agriculture. Poultry Farming is highly approached too. People sell the animal's milk to nearby Dairies. Gorkhali Dairy is one of the major dairy of here. Apart from this people are also involved in many professions like teaching, banking etc.

== Sports ==
Among the many sports played here, football, cricket, and volleyball are the most popular. The Paharilotar Sport Association is the governing body of sports here. The representative football club of village is Paharilotar Football Club.
