= Lakhanpur, Ramechhap =

Coordinates: 27°34′N 85°51′E

Lakhanpur लखनपुर
- Village Development Committee
- Interactive map of Lakhanpur
- Country: Nepal
- Zone: Janakpur Zone
- District: Ramechhap District

Population (1991)
  - Total: 6,058
- Time zone: UTC+5:45 (Nepal Time)

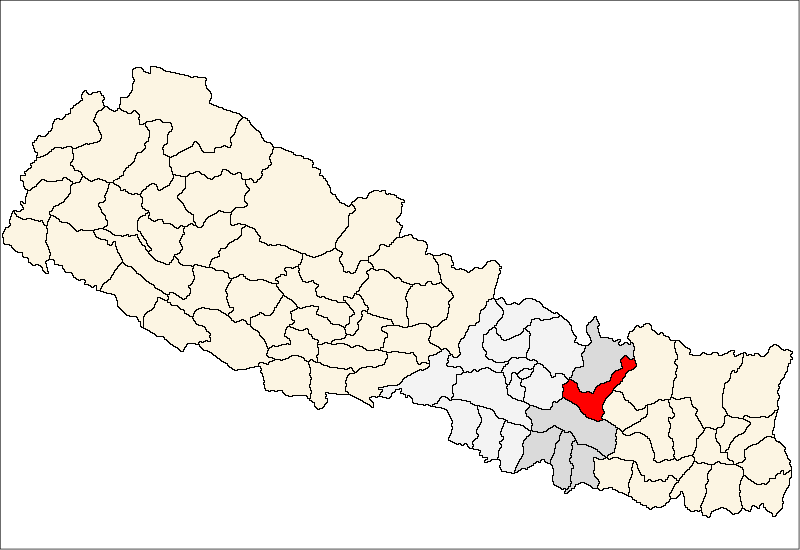
Map showing Ramechhap District, in the Janakpur Zone of north-eastern Nepal, where Lakhanpur is located

Lakhanpur is a Village Development Committee in Ramechhap District in the Janakpur Zone of north-eastern Nepal. At the time of the 1991 Nepal census it had a population of 6,058 people residing in 1,100 individual households.
