= Dadhuwa =

Daduwa डडुवा
- Village development committee
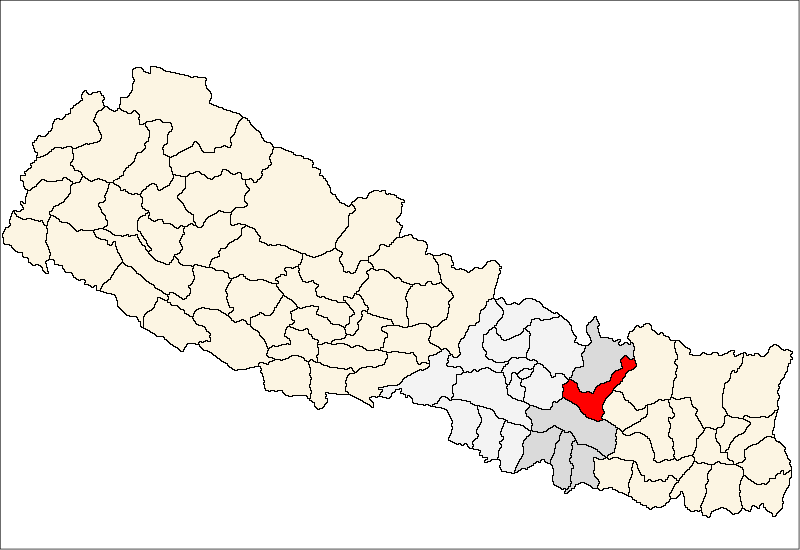

- Location in Nepal
- Coordinates: 27.53°N 85.98°E
- Country: Nepal
- Zone: Janakpur Zone
- District: Ramechhap District

Population (1991)
  - Total: 4,320
- Time zone: UTC+5:45 (Nepal Time)

Dadhuwa is a village development committee in Ramechhap District in the Janakpur Zone of north-eastern Nepal. At the time of the 1991 Nepal census it had a population of 4,320 people living in 806 individual households.
