= Gupteshwar, Ramechhap =

Gupteshwar गुप्तेश्वर
- Village development committee
- Location in Nepal
- Coordinates: 27.52°N 86.24°E
- Country: Nepal
- Zone: Janakpur Zone
- District: Ramechhap District

Population (1991)
  - Total: 1,708
- Time zone: UTC+5:45 (Nepal Time)

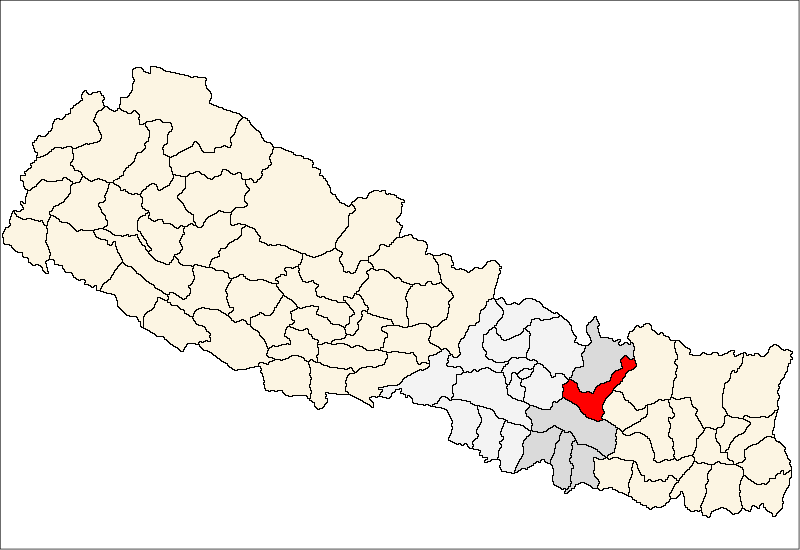

Gupteshwar is a village development committee in Ramechhap District in the Janakpur Zone of north-eastern Nepal. At the time of the 1991 Nepal census it had a population of 1,708 people living in 310 individual households.
