= Likhu Rural Municipality, Nuwakot =

Likhu लिखु
- Gaunplaika
- Location in Nepal
- Coordinates: 27.87°N 85.41°E
- Country: Nepal
- Province: Bagmati Province
- District: Nuwakot District

Population (1991)
  - Total: 2,549
- Time zone: UTC+5:45 (Nepal Time)
- Website: https://likhumunnuwakot.gov.np/

Likhu is a Gaunpalika and former village development committee in Nuwakot District in Bagmati Province of central Nepal. There are 6 wards. Likhu is the name of the River Likhu Gaupalika is named from the Likhu River. At the time of the 1991 Nepal census it had a population of 2549 people living in 499 individual households.
