= Priti, Nepal =

Priti प्रीती
- Village development committee
- Location in Nepal
- Coordinates: 27.53°N 86.30°E
- Country: Nepal
- Zone: Janakpur Zone
- District: Ramechhap District

Population (1991)
  - Total: 4,660
- Time zone: UTC+5:45 (Nepal Time)

Priti is a village development committee in Ramechhap District in the Janakpur Zone of north-eastern Nepal. At the time of the 1991 Nepal census it had a population of 4,660 people living in 948 individual households.

Around 80 percent of people in Priti are Sunuwar.
