= Bhadaure, Ramechhap =

Coordinates: 27°28′N 85°59′E

Gagal Bhadaure गागल भदौरे
- Village development committee
- Interactive map of Gagal Bhadaure
- Country: Nepal
- Zone: Janakpur Zone
- District: Ramechhap District

Government
  - Type: Khadadevi Rural Municipality ward 8 council
  - Chair Person: Janga Lal Tamang

Population (1991)
  - Total: 2,596
- Time zone: UTC+5:45 (Nepal Time)

Gagal Bhadaure is a village development committee in Ramechhap District in the Janakpur Zone of north-eastern Nepal. At the time of the 1991 Nepal census it had a population of 2,596 people living in 468 individual households.
