= Bamti Bhandar =

Bamti Bhandar बाम्ती भण्डार
- Village development committee
- Location in Nepal
- Coordinates: 27.57°N 86.36°E
- Country: Nepal
- Zone: Janakpur Zone
- District: Ramechhap District

Population (1991)
  - Total: 2,895
- Time zone: UTC+5:45 (Nepal Time)

Bamti Bhandar is a former village development committee in Ramechhap District in the Janakpur Zone of north-eastern Nepal. At the time of the 1991 Nepal census it had a population of 2,895.
