= Khaniyapani =

Khaniyapani खनियापानी
- Village development committee
- Location in Nepal
- Coordinates: 27.47°N 85.86°E
- Country: Nepal
- Zone: Janakpur Zone
- District: Ramechhap District

Population (1991)
  - Total: 4,086
- Time zone: UTC+5:45 (Nepal Time)

Khaniyapani is a village development committee in Ramechhap District in the Janakpur Zone of north-eastern Nepal. At the time of the 1991 Nepal census it had a population of 4,086 people living in 684 individual households.
