= Rakathum =

Rakathum राकाथुम
- Village development committee
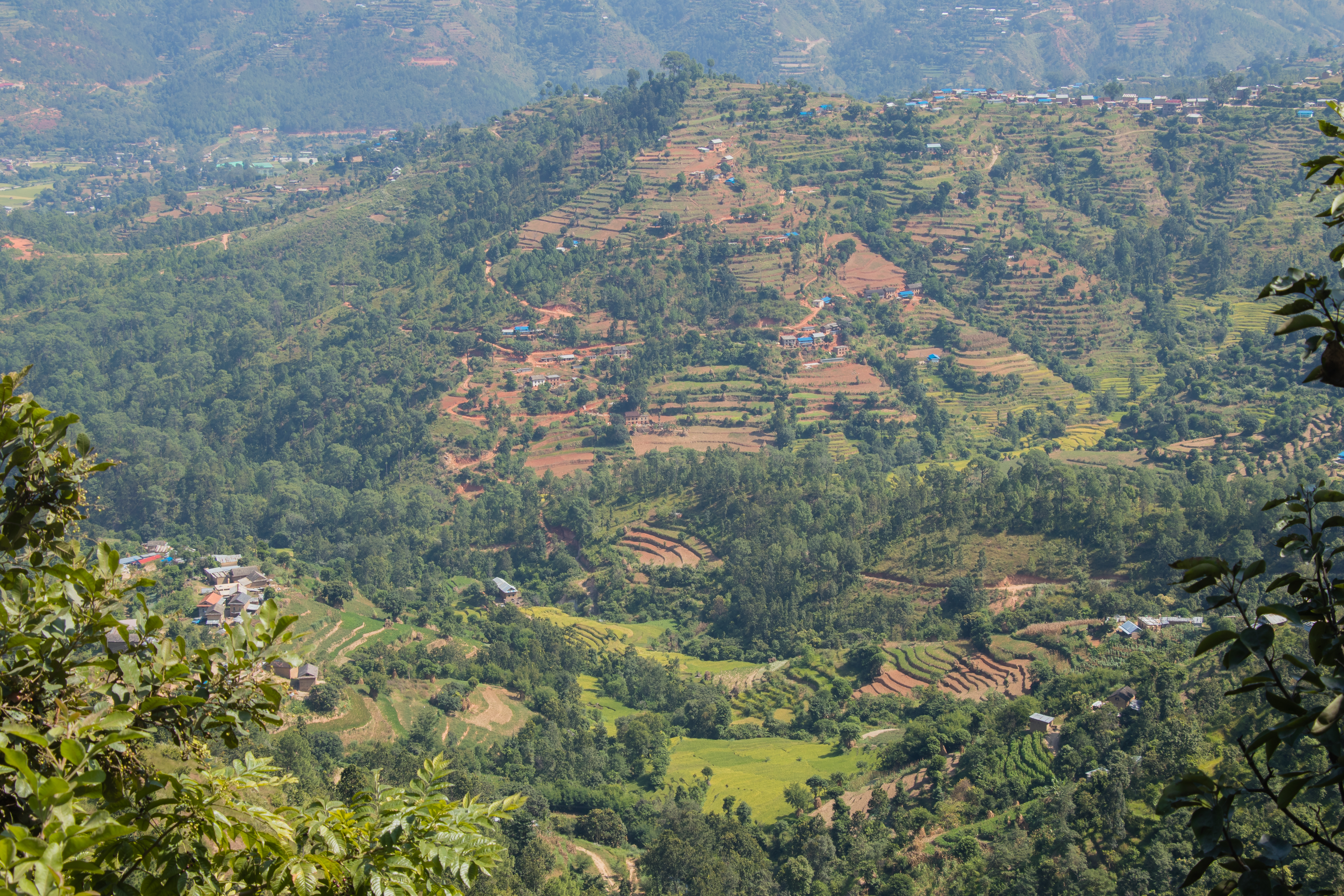
- Rakathum

- Location in Nepal
- Coordinates: 27.44°N 85.87°E
- Country: Nepal
- Zone: Janakpur Zone
- District: Ramechhap District

Population (1991)
  - Total: 3,102
- Time zone: UTC+5:45 (Nepal Time)

Rakathum is a village development committee in Ramechhap District in the Bagmati zone of Nepal. At the time of the 1991 Nepal census it had a population of 3,102 people living in 478 individual households.
