= Those, Nepal =

Those, Nepal ठोसे Gokulganga Rural Municipality-2
- Village development committee
- Nickname: मेक्चन
- Location in Nepal
- Coordinates: 27.58°N 86.27°E
- Country: Nepal
- Zone: Janakpur Zone
- District: Ramechhap District

Population (1991)
  - Total: 2,283
- Time zone: UTC+5:45 (Nepal Time)

Those, Nepal is a village development committee in Ramechhap District in the Janakpur Zone of northeastern Nepal. At the time of the 1991 Nepal census it had a population of 2,283 people living in 490 individual households.
