= Makadum =

Makadum माकादुम
- Village development committee
- Location in Nepal
- Coordinates: 27.45°N 85.95°E
- Country: Nepal
- Zone: Janakpur Zone
- District: Ramechhap District

Population (1991)
  - Total: 2,233
- Time zone: UTC+5:45 (Nepal Time)

Makadum is a village development committee in Ramechhap District in the Janakpur Zone of north-eastern Nepal. At the time of the 1991 Nepal census, it had a population of 2,233 people living in 360 individual households.
