= Majuwa, Ramechhap =

Coordinates: 27.45°N 85.91°E

Majuwa मजुवा
- Village Development Committee
- Interactive map of Majuwa
- Country: Nepal
- Zone: Janakpur Zone
- District: Ramechhap District

Population (1991)
  - Total: 2,516
- Time zone: UTC+5:45 (Nepal Time)

Majuwa is a Village Development Committee in Ramechhap District in the Janakpur Zone of north-eastern Nepal. At the time of the 1991 Nepal census it had a population of 2,516 people residing in 423 individual households.
