= Gumdel =

Gumdel गुम्देल
- Village development committee
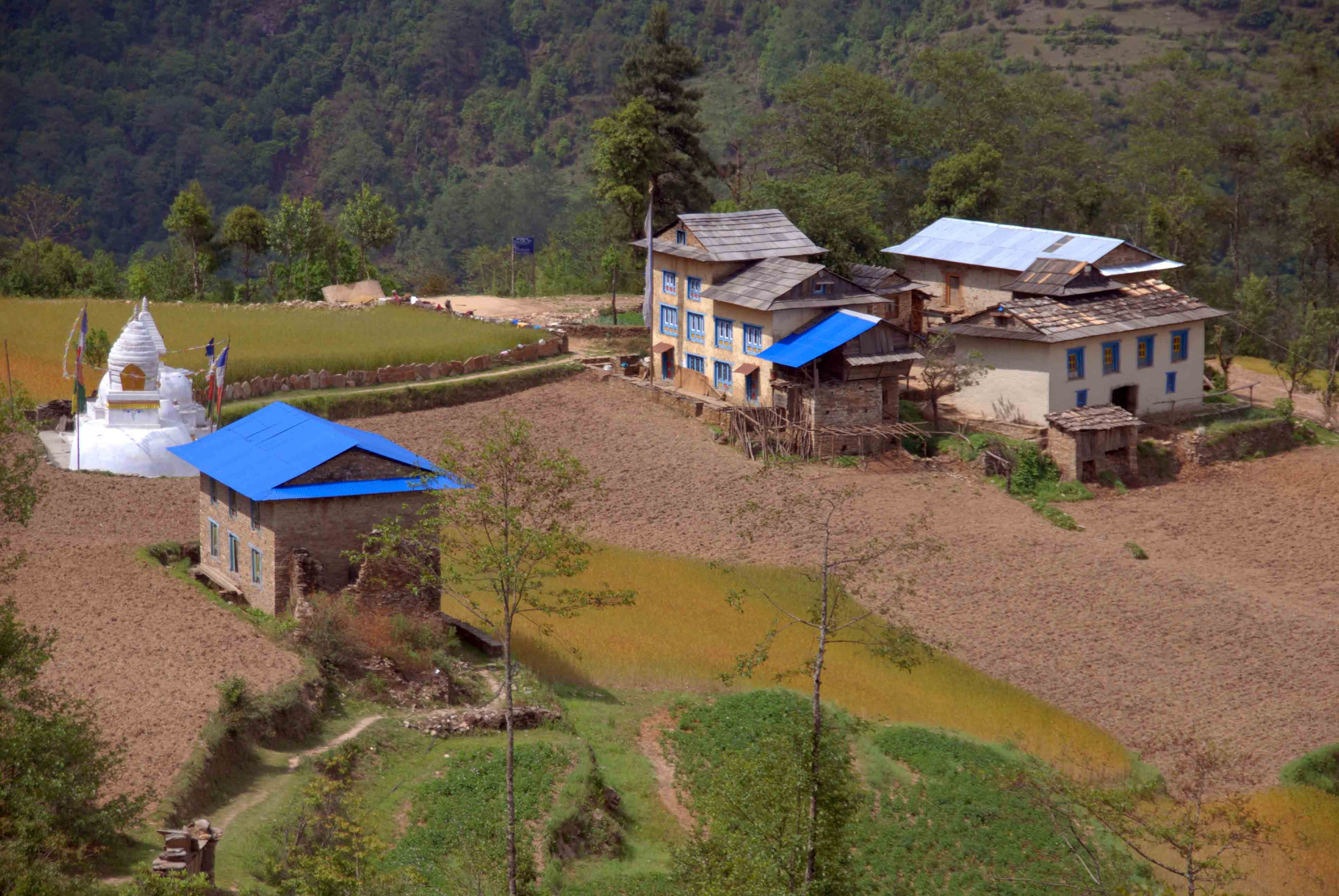

- Location in Nepal
- Coordinates: 27.71°N 86.48°E
- Country: Nepal
- Province: Bagmati Province
- District: Ramechhap District

Population (1991)
  - Total: 2,644
- Time zone: UTC+5:45 (Nepal Time)

Gumdel is a village development committee in Ramechhap District in the Bagmati Province of north-eastern Nepal. At the time of the 1991 Nepal census it had a population of 2,644 people living in 486 individual households.
