= Saipu =

Coordinates: 27.4333°N 86.2500°E

Saipu सैपु
- Village development committee
- Interactive map of Saipu
- Country: Nepal
- Zone: Janakpur Zone
- District: Ramechhap District

Population (1991)
  - Total: 2,593
- Time zone: UTC+5:45 (Nepal Time)

Saipu is a village development committee in Ramechhap District in the Janakpur Zone of north-eastern Nepal. At the time of the 1991 Nepal census it had a population of 2,876 people living in 616 individual households.
