= Piukhuri =

Coordinates: 27.4500°N 86.0167°E

Piukhuri पिउखुरी
- Village development committee
- Interactive map of Piukhuri
- Country: Nepal
- Zone: Janakpur Zone
- District: Ramechhap District

Population (1991)
  - Total: 2,026
- Time zone: UTC+5:45 (Nepal Time)

Piukhuri is a village development committee in Ramechhap District in the Janakpur Zone of north-eastern Nepal. At the time of the 1991 Nepal census it had a population of 2,026 people living in 358 individual households.
