= Sunwar language =

Kiranti language of Nepal and India

Sunuwar
- Kiranti-Kõits
- सुनुवार, कोइँच, किराँती-कोइँच, मुखिया
- Kõica in Jenticha script; Sunuwar in Tikamuli and Devanagari script
- Region: Nepal; India (Sikkim and West Bengal)
- Ethnicity: Sunuwar
- Native speakers: 37,898 (2011)
- Language family: Sino-Tibetan: Tibeto-Burman; Mahakiranti (?); Kiranti; Western; Northwestern; Sunuwar
- Dialects: Surel
- Writing system: Devanagari; Sunuwar (Sikkim, India); Tikamuli (2005)

Official status
- Official language in: India: Sikkim

Language codes
- ISO 639-3: suz
- Glottolog: sunw1242
- ELP: Sunwar

Sunwar greeting

Sunuwar, or Koinch (कोइँच; kõich; other spellings are Koinch and Koincha), is a Kiranti language of the Sino-Tibetan language family spoken in Nepal and India by the Sunuwar people. It was first comprehensively attested by the Himalayan Languages Project. It is also known as Kõits Lo (कोइँच लो ; kõica lo), Kiranti-Kõits (किराँती-कोइँच ; kirā̃tī-kõich), and Mukhiya (मुखिया ; mukhiyā).

The Sunuwar language is one of the smaller members of the Tibeto-Burman language family. About 40,000 speakers are residing in eastern Nepal.

== Names ==
The language is commonly known as Koic, for many ethnic Sunuwar speakers also refer to the language as “Sunuwar, Koinch, Koinch or Koincha (कोइँच); Kõits Lo (कोइँच लो), Kiranti-Kõits (किराँती-कोइँच) or Mukhiya (मुखिया).”

Moreover, most Sunwar speakers have the surname (सुनुवार), Sunuvār in Latin script.

== Geographic distribution ==
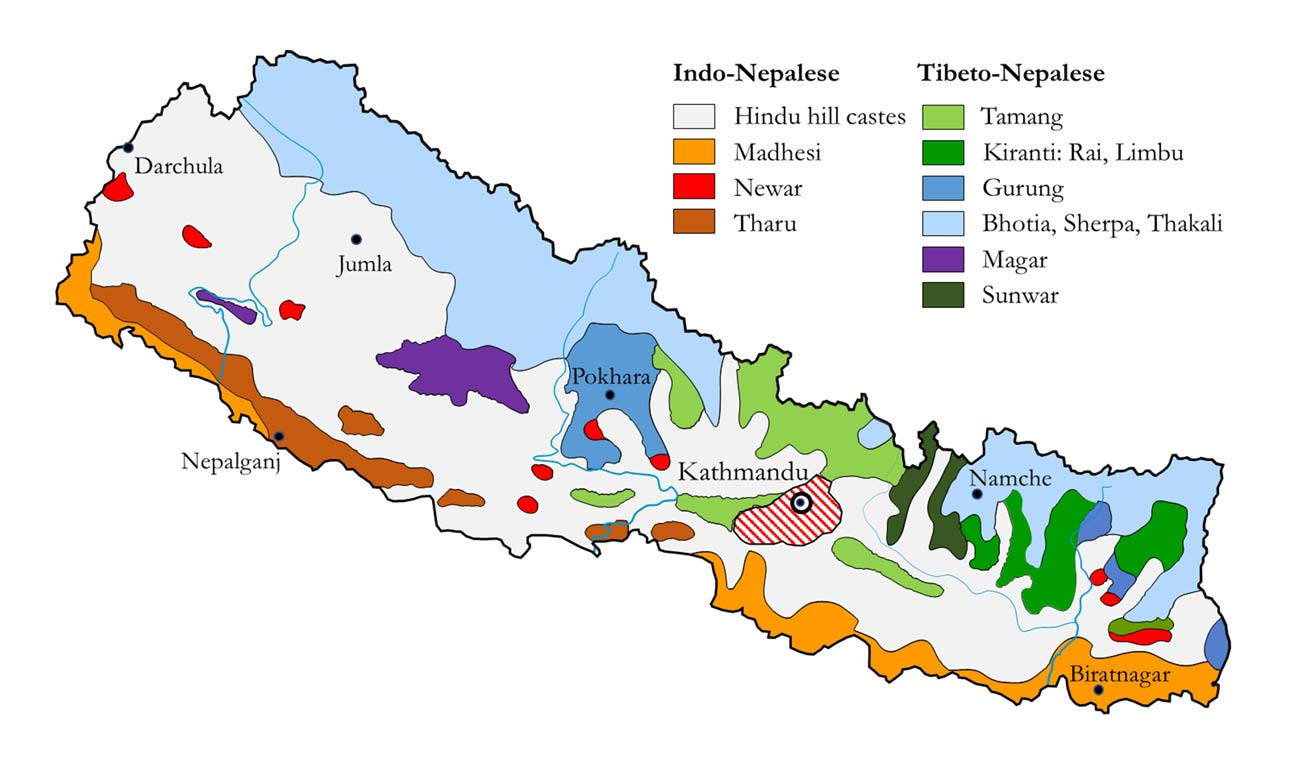
Small groups of Sunwar speakers located in Nepal

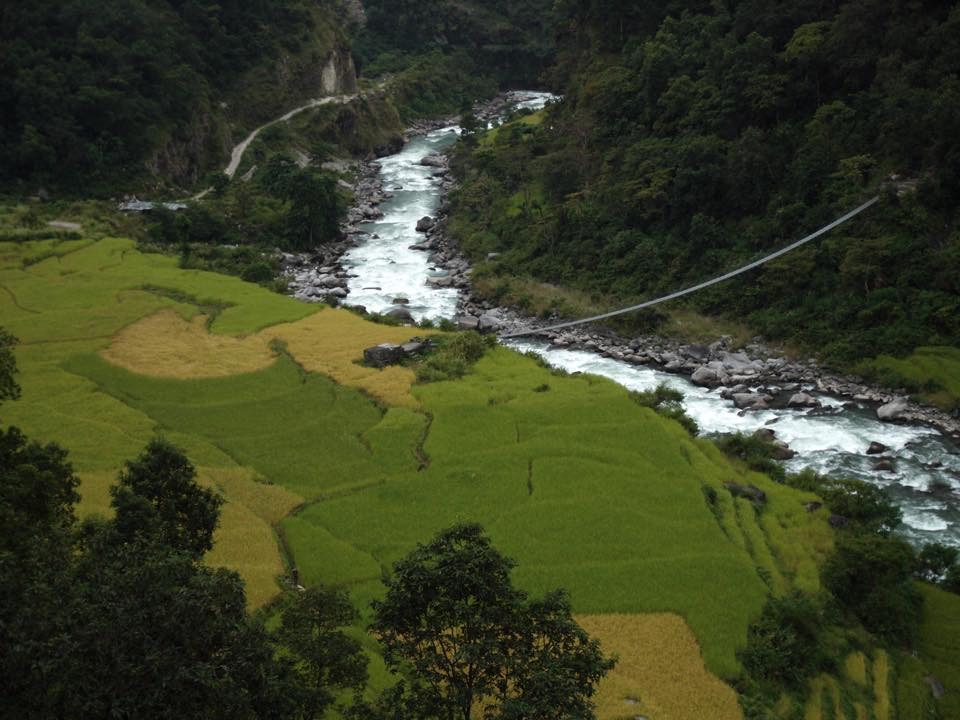
Likhu Khola river

The Sunuwar language is commonly spoken in a cluster of Sunuwar villages, located around the region of the core spoken language. These villages are scattered alongside the river banks of Likhu Khola, in two bordering central-eastern districts of Nepal, distant from the main Nepalese road system: in the Okhaldhū۠ngā District (part of Koshi Province), around the village of Vacul; and in the Rāmechāp District (part of Bagmati Province), around the villages of Pahare and of Kũbhu Kãsthālī for a smaller group of Sunwar speakers. The majority of the Sunwar speakers live on the southern border area of this region, between the villages of Pahare and Vacul.

Located 1,800 meters above sea level, their fields aren’t all fallow from year round cultivation (Borchers, 2008). Therefore, many Sunwar households are farmers, own a small lot of land and livestock. Moreover, each village often visits their neighboring village markets to purchase inaccessible goods such as spices, sugar, tea, and salt. In the winter, they experience no snow but freezing temperatures. In warmer weather, they experience a lot of rainfall, in the summer, monsoon rainfall. Especially between June and August, it is when they experience the most rain, more so monsoon rainfall.

According to Borchers, there are other villages located outside of the core region. The Surel are claimed to be Sunwar speakers, however, there are no certainties that it is true.

== Phonology ==
Sunwar phonology is significantly influenced by the language of Nepali.

=== Consonants ===
The Sunwar language has a mid-sized arrangement of thirty-two consonantal phonemes:

		Labial	Dental	Alveolar	Retroflex	Palatal	Velar	Glottal
Nasal		m ⟨m⟩	n ⟨n⟩				ŋ ⟨ṅ⟩	
Plosive	voiceless	p ⟨p⟩	t̪ ⟨t⟩		ʈ ⟨ṭ⟩	c ⟨c⟩	k ⟨k⟩	ʔ ⟨ʔ⟩
Plosive	aspirated	pʰ~ɸ ⟨ph⟩	t̪ʰ ⟨th⟩		ʈʰ ⟨ṭh⟩	(cʰ ⟨ch⟩)	kʰ ⟨kh⟩	
Plosive	voiced	b ⟨b⟩	d̪ ⟨d⟩		(ɖ ⟨ḍ⟩)	ɟ ⟨j⟩	ɡ ⟨g⟩	
Plosive	breathy	(bʱ ⟨bh⟩)	(d̪ʱ ⟨dh⟩)		(ɖʱ ⟨ḍh⟩)	(ɟʱ ⟨jh⟩)	(ɡʱ ⟨gh⟩)	
Plosive	implosive	w~b ⟨ɓ⟩						
Fricative	sibilant			s ⟨s⟩		ʃ ⟨ʃ⟩		
Fricative	plain					[ç]	[x]	h ⟨h⟩
Approximant		w~wʱ ⟨w⟩	l̪ ⟨l⟩		[ɭ]	j ⟨y⟩		
Tap				ɾ ⟨r⟩				

- Sound in parentheses only are heard in words borrowed from Nepali. Sounds in brackets are only heard as allophones.
- The implosive sound [ɓ] was heard phonemically until recently among dialects. It is now heard as a plosive [b] in the village of Saipu, and as an approximant [w] in the village of Kũbhu. It is only heard rarely in word-initial position among the speakers of Saipu.

=== Vowels ===
According to Borchers, there are eleven vowel phonemes in Sunwar:

⟨a⟩ [a~ɑ], /ā / [aː], /e/ [e~ɛ], /i/ [i], /o/ [o], /u/ [u], / ū/ [uː~y], /ã/ [ã~ɑ̃], /ã̄/ [ãː], /ẽ/ [ẽ~ɛ̃], /ĩ/ [ĩ]

	Front	Central	Back
High	/i/ [i], /ū/ [y] /ĩ/ [ĩ]		/ū/ [uː~y], /u/ [u] (ũ)
Mid	/e/ [e~ɛ] /ẽ/ [ẽ~ɛ̃]		/o/ [o] (õ)
Low		/a/ [a~ɑ], /ā / [aː] /ã/ [ã~ɑ̃], /ã̄/ [ãː]	

- Vowels with bar - Represents long vowels
- Vowels with tilde - Represents short nasalized vowels
- Vowels with bar and tilde - Represents long and nasalized vowels

=== Diphthongs ===
There are a total of eight diphthongs in Sunuwar: /ai/ [aɪ], /aĩ/ [aɪ̃], /au/ [au], /eu/ [eu], /oi/ [oi], /oĩ/ [oĩ], /ui/ [ui], /uĩ/ [uĩ]

According to Borchers, a principled way to distinguish diphthongs from a sequence of two monophthongs does not exist in the Sunwar language.

As exemplified by Borchers, this table consists of examples of contrasts between diphthongs:

/joi/	[ɟoi]	‘tiger’
/joĩ/	[ɟoĩ]	‘younger sister’s husband’
/muicā/	[muicaː]	‘wear shoes’
/puĩcā/	[puĩcaː]	‘ask for, beg’
/goi/	[ɡoi]	‘you’
/gui/	[ɡui]	‘hand’
/reu/	[ɾeu]	‘rain’
/roi/	[ɾoi]	‘ill’

=== Syllable structure ===
Syllable Structure of Sunuwar: C(C)V(V)(C)(C)

== Written language ==
=== Sunuwar alphabet (Koĩts) ===
Sunuwar 𑯆𑯑𑯃̐𑯌 𑯎̭𑯂𑯒𑯂 Jenticha script • Kõits script
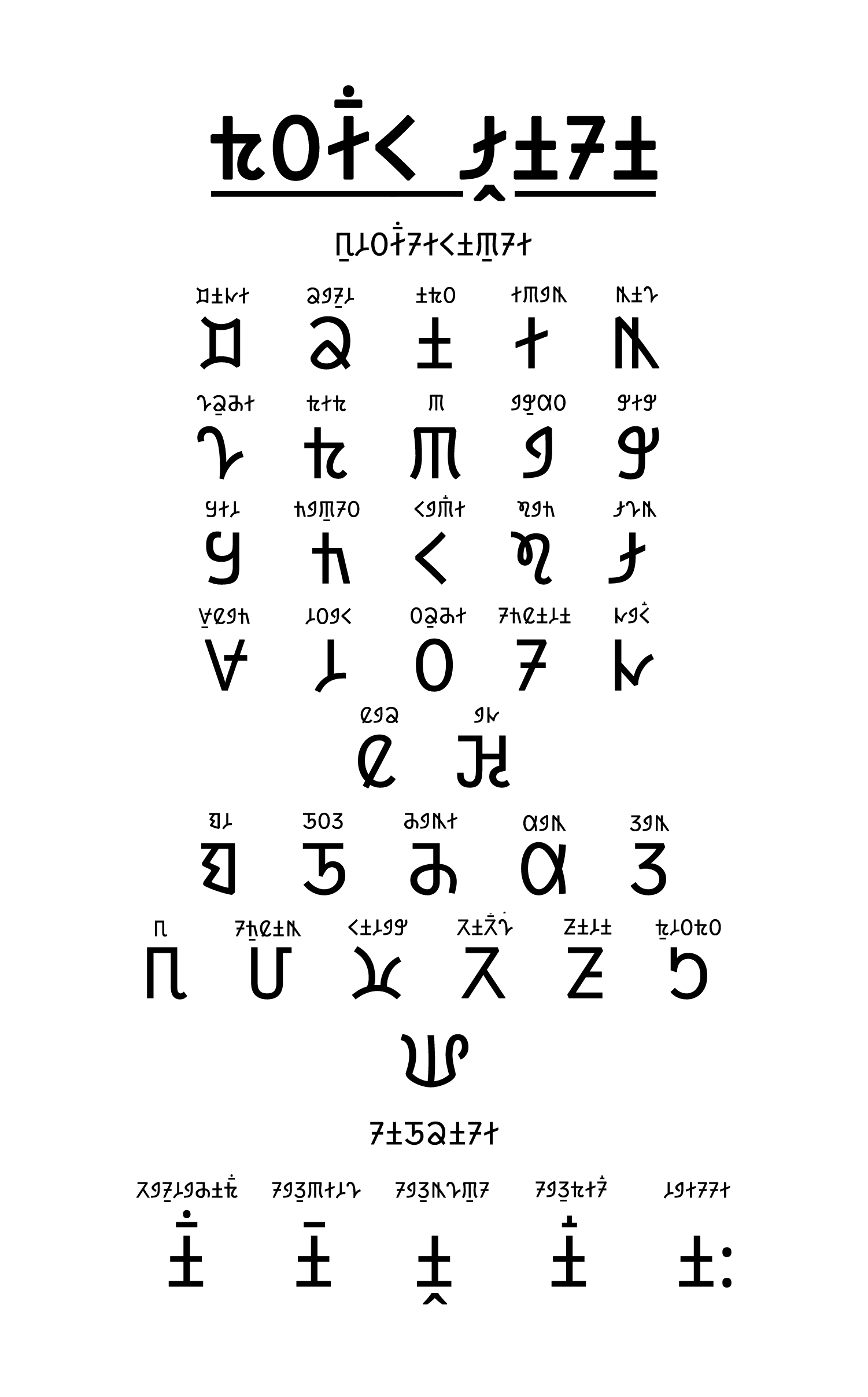
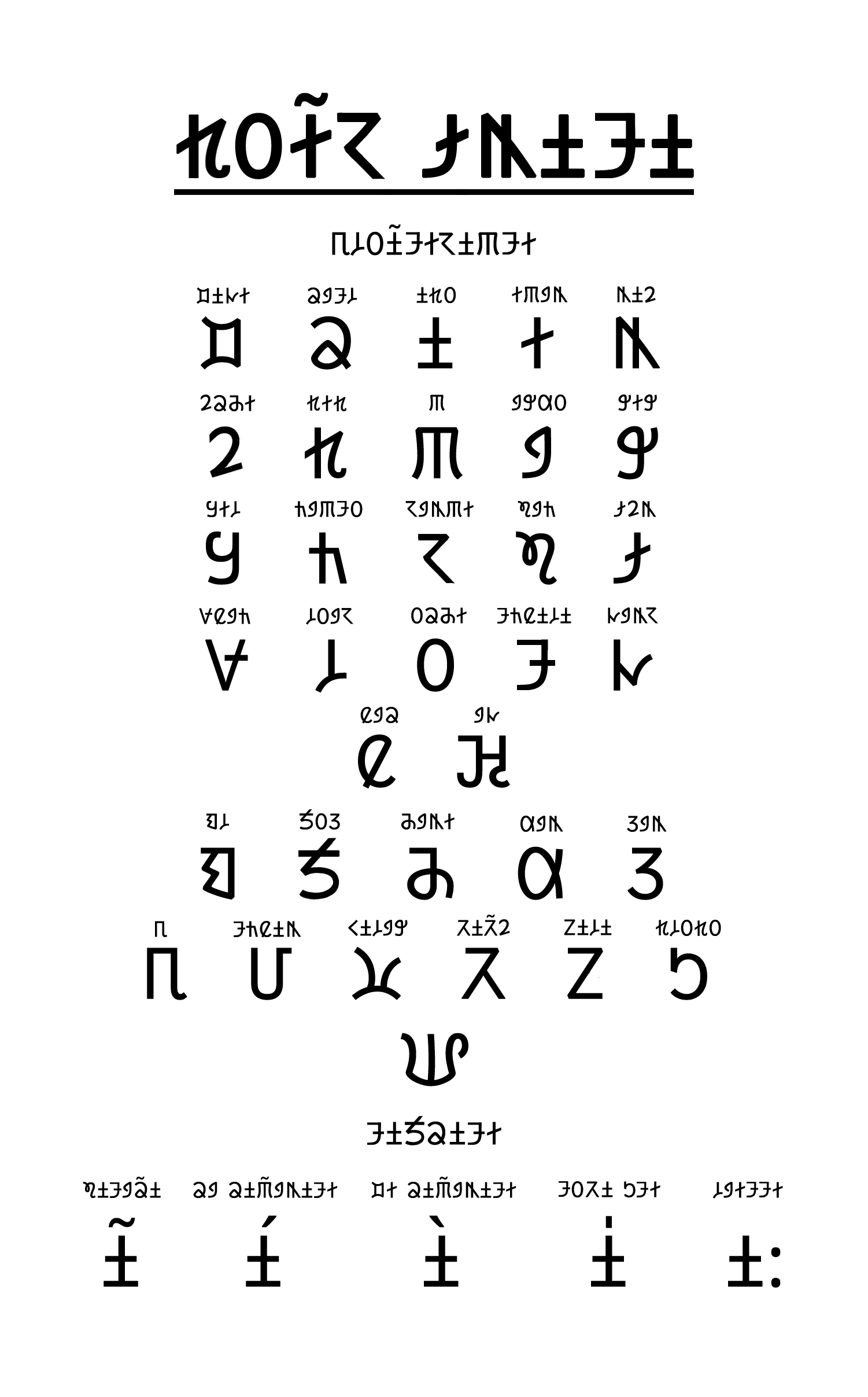
- Script type: Alphabet
- Creator: Krishna Bahadur Jenticha
- Created: 1942
- Period: 1942 to present
- Direction: Left to right
- Official script: Yes
- Region: Nepal, Sikkim
- Language: Sunuwar language

Related scripts
- Parent systems: Original invention: Sunuwar

ISO 15924
- ISO 15924: Sunu (274), Sunuwar

Unicode
- Unicode alias: Sunuwar
- Unicode range: U+11BC0–U+11BFF

The Sunuwar alphabet (Sunwar: कोइँच , 𑯆𑯑𑯃̐𑯌 𑯎̭𑯂𑯒𑯂), also known as Jenticha script, or Koĩts script, was promoted in 1932 by Karna Bahadur Sunuwar (1926-1991), and got official recognition in Sikkim and Eastern Nepal where it is taught in schools. Sunuwar speakers from Nepal and Sikkim, northeastern India, use the Sunuwar alphabet for printed materials such as newspapers and literature.

The Sunuwar script is unrelated to any other scripts (even if some letter shapes have some resemblance to Latin and Limbu letter forms with similar phonetic value), and behaves like an alphabet with 35 base letters, written left-to-right, with syllabic features, extended with combining diacritics. The script also features its own set of decimal digits.

Unlike other Indic scripts derived from Brahmic, the Sunuwar alphabet includes no combining vowel signs: the script was initially a pure alphabet and the base consonants initially did not have any inherent vowel. But a second version of the script modified the orthographic rules to imply its presence, where the inherent vowel would be altered when appending any independent vowel letters, or suppressed by using a virama (or halant) sign in some consonant clusters or for consonants in final position of syllables. The independent letter form for the inherent vowel is now removed in most cases from the normal orthography in the middle of words, only used in isolation (i.e. no longer written when following a leading consonant, unless it is at end of words). A number of glyphic forms (conjuncts using consonants in half forms) were added to the script after this orthographic change for more easily writing consonant clusters, instead of writing multiple consonants with virama signs.

=== Tikamuli ===
Tikamuli तिकामुली ब्रेसे Tikamuli Brese
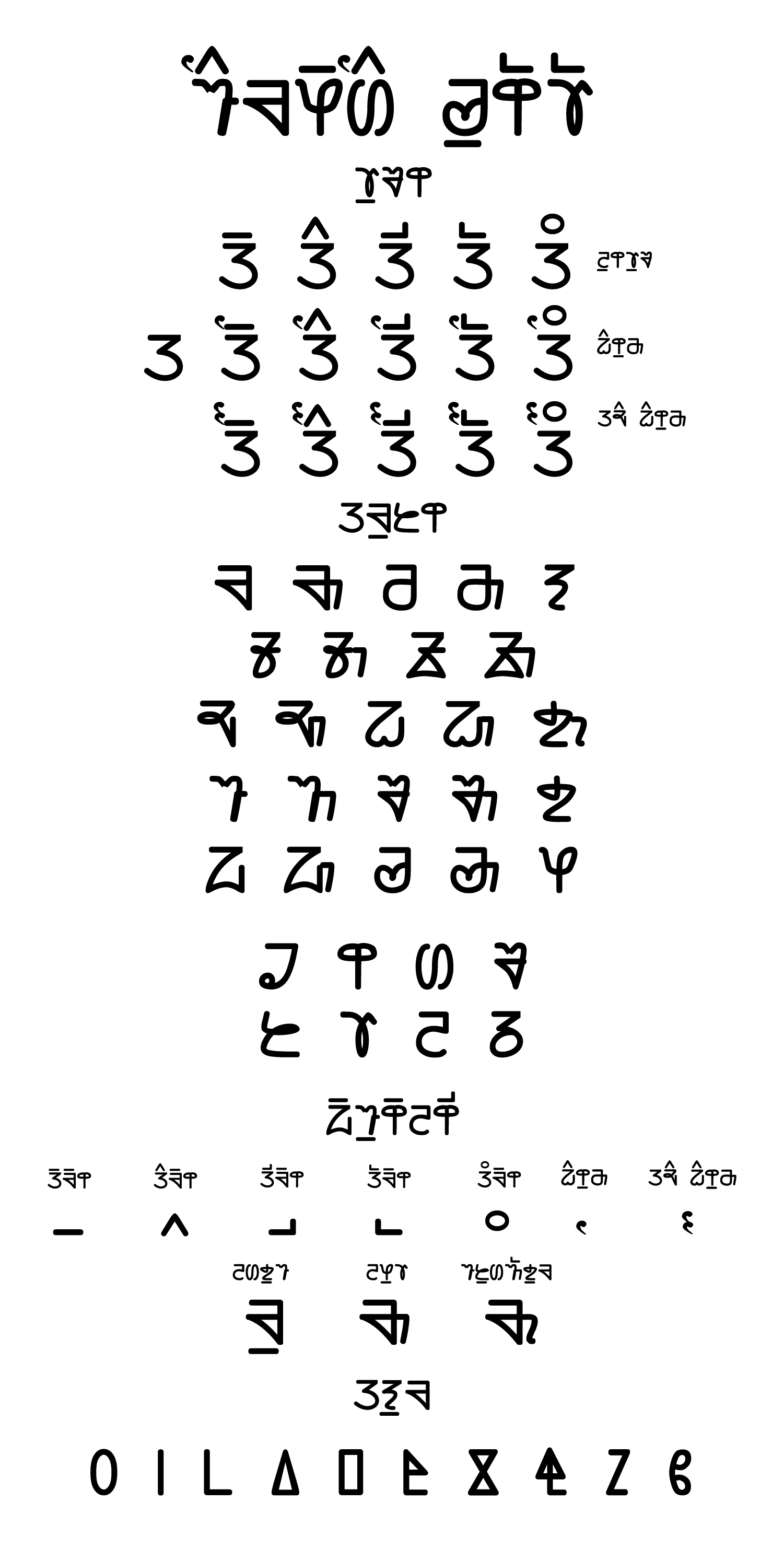
- Tikamuli Varnamala (Alphabet Chart)
- Script type: Abugida
- Creator: Tikaram Mulicha
- Created: 2005
- Period: 2005 to present
- Direction: Left to right
- Region: Nepal
- Language: Sunuwar language

Related scripts
- Parent systems: Original invention: Tikamuli

The Tikamuli script (Sunwar: तिकामुली ब्रेसे) is a writing system developed by Tikaram Mulicha for writing the Sunuwar language. It is an abugida writing system based on the Brahmi, created within the Sunuwar community in Nepal as an alternative to the Jenticha script (Sunuwar script). The script has one vowel carrier with 5 diacritics, 32 basic consonants and 3 diacritic marks.

At present, the use of this script is limited to Nepal, with the wider community preferring the Koits script.

=== Devanagari ===
Although Sunwar had no traditional written language in Nepal, most literate speakers use the Devanagari abugida, also used for writing Nepali.

Independent vowels and diphthongs

अ a IPA: [ə]	आ ā IPA: [aː]	इ i IPA: [i]	उ u IPA: [u]	ए e IPA: [e]	
ओ o IPA: [o]	ऐ ai IPA: [ai]	औ au IPA: [au]	एउ eu IPA: [eu]	उइ ui IPA: [ui]	ओइ oi IPA: [oi]

Consonants with inherent vowel

क ka IPA: [kə]	ख kha IPA: [kʰə]	ग ga IPA: [ɡə]	ङ nga IPA: [ŋə]	अ् ’ IPA: [ʔ]
च ca IPA: [t͡ʃə]	ज ja IPA: [d͡ʒə]	ट ṭa IPA: [ʈə]	ठ ṭha IPA: [ʈʰə]	
त ta IPA: [tə]	थ tha IPA: [tʰə]	द da IPA: [də]	न na IPA: [nə]	
प pa IPA: [pə]	फ pha IPA: [pʰə]	ब ba IPA: [bə]	म ma IPA: [mə]	
य ya IPA: [jə]	र ra IPA: [rə]	ल la IPA: [lə]	व va IPA: [və]	
शष sha IPA: [ʃə]	स sa IPA: [ sə]	ह ha IPA: [hə]	व्हीह्व hha IPA: [ɦə]	

Combining diacritics
The sign ्, known in Sunuwar as sangmilu, represents a virama or halant; it is used to silent the inherent vowel after the consonant.
The sign ँ, known in Sunuwar as taslathenk, corresponds to the candrabindu in Devanagari; it is used to nasalize the vowel.

्	ँ
sangmilu (virama or halant)	taslathenk (cadrabindu)
mutes the inherent vowel	indicates nasalization of the vowel

== Morphology ==
=== Markers ===
==== Case-marking suffixes ====
According to Borchers, “all case markers in the Sunuwar language are suffixes.”

As exemplified by Borchers, this table consists of the noun case markers.

Morpheme:	Gloss:	Marks:	Occurs suffixed to denotions of:
-mī ~ -amī ~-ī m ~ -m	INS/L OC	agents, instruments, locations	persons, things, locations
-kali ~ -kal	OBJ	patients	persons, animals
-ke	POSS	possessions of animate beings	persons, animals
-ṅā	GEN	belongings of inanimate items	things, locations
-lā/-le	FROM	place of departure of persons or items that changed places (ABL); time of begin of action	locations, time
-re	FROM	place of departure of persons or items that changed places (ABL); time of begin of action	locations, time
-au	VOC	name of person called	persons

==== Dual marker ====
A dual marker can be associated with dual/pair or the cardinal number ‘two’.

Morpheme:	⟨-niʃi⟩
Gloss:	Dual (DU)

Example of dual marker by Borchers:

iciṅā āl.niʃi chan
Now child.DU exist-NPT.3P
Now I have two children.

==== Plural marker ====
In the Sunuwar language, both nouns and pronouns can be marked as dual or plural.

In addition items in a group can be marked plural.

Morpheme:	⟨-paki ~ -puki ~ -piki⟩
Gloss:	Plural (PL)

Examples of the plural marker used to point at items in a group by Borchers:

pujā dum pachi rãga po.paki sai.ni.mī
worship happen after buffalo pig.PL kill.NPT-23D/-P.3P/SVI
After worship, they kill the buffalo, pig and so on.

sāg.paki acā.paki ho.ʃa.ṅāmin ʃam cai thupro dum.ba thupro tu.ni.miิ
sāg.PL pickle.PL keep.PF.then beer SNG much happen.NPT+3S much drink.NPT-23D/-P.3P/SVI
Having stored away sāg (green leafy vegetable) and so on and pickle and so on and, there has to be much beer, they drink a lot.

==== Absent marker ====
According to Borchers, the Sunuwar language does not have a zero morpheme, but it can still indicate the number amount of something through verbal agreement markers or numerals.

Example of the absent marker by Borchers:

go khame jāʔi.na.sku
I rice eat.NPT-1D.1D
Wed eat rice.

=== Suffixes ===
==== Possessive suffix: ⟨-ke⟩ (Animate Agent) ====
According to Borchers, the possessive suffix ⟨-ke⟩ is attached to a human or animate agent to indicate a possessive relationship.

Morpheme:	⟨-ke⟩
Gloss:	Possessive (POSS)

Examples of the possessive ⟨-ke⟩ by Borchers:

nāso.ke dui.ta dhol bā.ba dhanu.kan nāso.ke bā.ba
priest.POSS two.piece drum stay.NPT+3S bow.arrow priest.POSS stay.NPT+3S
The priest has two drums. The priest has bow and arrow.

ne ʃo.ke bhāg ho
nose face.POSS part be-NPT.3S
The nose is part of the face.

==== Possessive suffix: ⟨-ke⟩ (inanimate subject) ====
According to Borchers, inanimate subjects are marked with the possessive suffix ⟨-ke⟩ to indicate what it is "made of". Example of possessive ⟨-ke⟩ indicating what it is "made of" by Borchers:

jasi.ke bā.b meko jasi ā.kilā
Jasi.POSS stay.NPT+3S that Jasi its.peg
It is made of Jasi wood. This is a peg made of Jasi wood. (Jasi is the tree Bauhinia variegata)

=== Quantifiers ===
Quantifiers in the Sunwar language are loaned from Nepali. Quantifiers are used for amounts or masses. As exemplified by Borchers, this table consists of quantifiers; including some that are loaned from Nepali.

From:	Translation:	
aic	small	
sappa	very much	[<Nep. besarī ‘very much’]
ʃuʃi	many, very, much	[<Nep. dherai]
sappa pan	very	[<Nep. ekdam]
ici oci	a little	
imci	some, a bit	
la:	only	[<Nep. mātra]
ʃūʃ ʃūs	much, very, expensive	
oci	some, little	[<Nep. thorai]
i:ʃika	much, a lot	[<Nep. thupro]
umcili	small	

Examples of quantifiers that indicate amounts or masses by Borchers:

go ʃūʃ ma.jai.nu.ṅ
I much NEG.eat.NPT+1S.1S
I don’t eat much.

disā matrei tui.nu.ṅ
tomorrow only know.NPT+1S.1S
I won’t know until tomorrow.

== Syntax ==
=== Adjectives: ⟨-ʃo⟩ ===
According to Borchers, adjectives can belong to the verbal noun form, with an attached ⟨ʃo⟩. In the Sunwar language, some adjectives are borrowed from Nepali.

==== Adjectives: Color forms ====
Borchers also notes that adjectives can belong to the form/term color. As exemplified by Borchers, this table consists of the color form/terms.

Form:	Translation:
jirjir	colorful
giิk	light green, light blue
nilo	dark blue [<Nep. nilo]
buʃ	white
kher	black
lal	red
ojela	brilliant

==== Adjectives: Non-verbal nouns without ⟨-ʃo⟩ attached ====
The Sunwar language has a category for adjectives under the form ‘others’, that are not verbal nouns. In addition, some adjectives may be interchangeable as an adverb. As exemplified by Borchers, this table consists of the adjectives that are not verbal nouns ending in ⟨-ʃo⟩ form/terms.

Form:	Translation:
umcili/ici	small, little
ʃūʃ	much, many, very, expensive
theb	big, great (idea, thing)
wan	far
netha	near

Examples of adjectives that are not verbal nouns ending in ⟨-ʃo⟩ by Borchers:

ɓak besā.n wan cha
water very-much.REIN far exist-NPT.3S
Water is far away.

go umcili thiẽ bara bars.ṅā
I small exist-PT.1S twelve year.GEN
I was small, twelve years old.

nepāli.puki ʃūʃ choto bā.ni.m
Nepali.PL very small stay.NPT-23D/-P.3P/SVI
Nepalese people are very small.

=== Particles ===
As exemplified by Borchers, this table consists of particles in correlation to various relationships.

Conjunction:	Translation:
de	or
hana	if
ṅana	if
dopā	that
meklāpāṅāmin	and then
pāṅāmin	and then
minu ⟨-nu⟩	and then
mapatke	because of

==== Postpositional particles ====
According to Borchers, the Sunwar language borrows particles from Nepali that indicate the relationship between clauses. Examples of postpositional particles by Borchers:

Postpotion:	Gloss:
lā	‘only’
-bhandā: A comparison.	‘than’
cai: Singling out or can be seen as “exactly this one”.	SNG
yo: Inclusive focus.	‘also’
kõ: A tag on questions asking for affirmation or negation of a statement.	OR
da ~ ta: Sunwar focus marker	IFOC

=== My stomach v.s. your stomach ===
Example by Borchers:

iิ koʔj
your stomach
your stomach

ā koʔj
my stomach
my stomach

== Syntax ==
In linguistic typology, a subject-object-verb (SOV) language is one in which the subject, object, and verb of a sentence always or usually appear in that order. If English were SOV, "Sam oranges ate" would be an ordinary sentence, as opposed to the actual Standard English "Sam ate oranges". (A Grammar of Sunwar)

Go khamay jainu
I rice eat
subject object verb
"I eat rice."

Sunwar people called "Khangsa" sign language with voice and direct action, for foreign people who do not understand Sunuwar.

Examples of order: Subject/Object/Verb by Borchers.

kuṣulanoʔbam.mī pani pher.ni.m
shoemaker.INS/LOC shoes sew.NPT-23D/-P.3P
subject object verb
Shoemakers make shoes.

Kocombo.mī buʔs sāʔī.b
mongoose.INS/LOC snake kill.NPT+3S
subject object verb
The mongoose kills a snake.

== Vocabulary ==
Seu+wa+la (Sewala)

Sunwar	English
Namsewal	Hello / Good Bye
Sew	(Respect) / (Greeting) / I bow to you
Maahr	What
Dohpachaa	How to
Dohshow	How much
Dohmoh	How big
Go	I
Gopuki	We are
Ge	You (informal)
Gepukhi	You are (informal)
Goi	we (formal)
GoiPuki	we are (formal)
Daarshow	Beautiful
Rimso	Good
MaDarshow	Ugly

=== Numerals (Devanagari) ===
1	ichi/kaa
2	ni/nishi
3	sa/saam
4	le
5	nga
6	ruku/roku
7	chani
8	sasi
9	van
10	gau
