= Gunsi Bhadaure =

Gunsi Bhadaure गुन्सी भदौरे
- Village development committee
- Location in Nepal
- Coordinates: 27.53°N 85.84°E
- Country: Nepal
- Zone: Janakpur Zone
- District: Ramechhap District

Population (1991)
  - Total: 4,945
- Time zone: UTC+5:45 (Nepal Time)

Gunsi Bhadaure is a village development committee in Ramechhap District in the Janakpur Zone of north-eastern Nepal. At the time of the 1991 Nepal census it had a population of 4,945 people living in 895 individual households.
