= Tokarpur =

Tokarpur टोकरपुर
- Village development committee
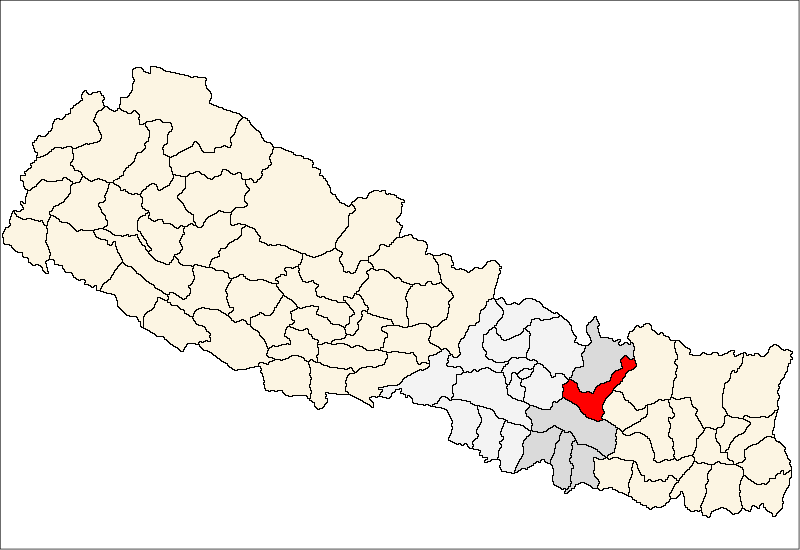

- Location in Nepal
- Coordinates: 27.55°N 85.92°E
- Country: Nepal
- Province: Bagmati Province
- District: Ramechhap District

Population (1991)
  - Total: 3,260
- Time zone: UTC+5:45 (Nepal Time)

Tokarpur is a village development committee in Ramechhap District in the Bagmati Province of north-eastern Nepal. At the time of the 1991 Nepal census it had a population of 3,260 people living in 632 individual households.
