= Sunuwar people =

Ethnic group in South Asia

Sunuwar, Sunwar, Koinch
सुनुवार, कोइँच
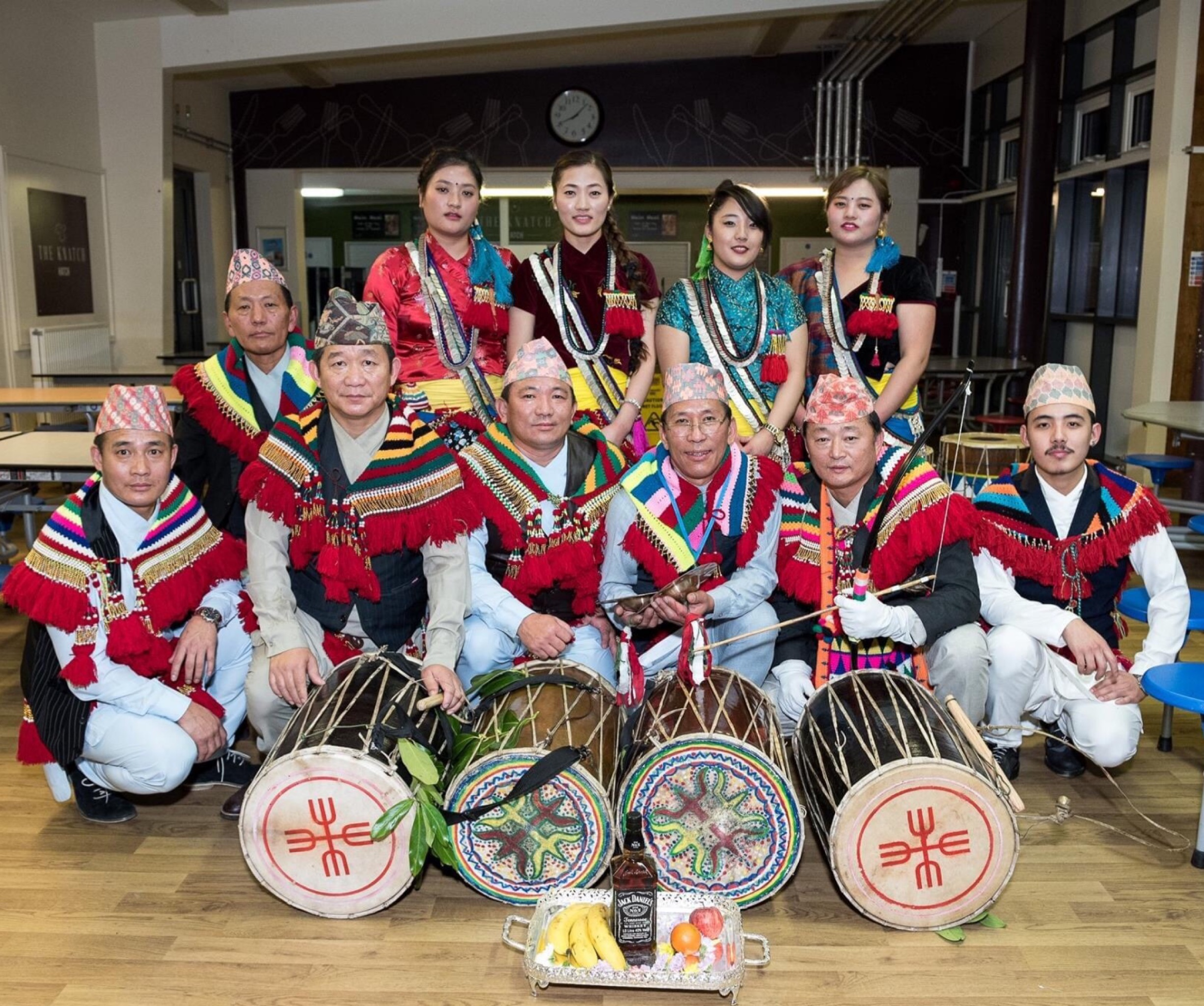
- Kirati Koinch Sunuwar

Total population
- Nepal 78,910 (2021)
- Sikkim: 3,795(2006)

Languages
- Sunuwar, Nepali

Religion
- Predominantly: Kiratism • Hinduism 92.29% • Christianity 7.23% (2011)

Related ethnic groups
- Rai; Limbu; Yakkha; Jirel; Hayu; Thami

The Sunuwar or Koinch are a Tibeto-Burman ethnic group (Nepali:सुनुवार जाति|Sunuwār Jāti), a Kirati tribe native to Nepal, parts of India (West Bengal and Sikkim) and southern Bhutan. They speak the Sunuwar language. According to the 2001 census of Nepal, 17% of the tribe follow the Kirant religion and adopt the Mundhum (Kiranti) culture.

The Kõinchs (Sunuwar) number 82,705 in total. The term ‘Kõinchs’ is also the name of the mother tongue. Other terms like Mukhiya or Mukhia are exonyms of the tribe. Sunuwar have a distinct language, religion, culture and social customs.

== Demographics ==
The Central Bureau of Statistics of Nepal classifies the Sunuwar as a subgroup within the broader social group of Mountain/Hill Janajati. At the time of the Nepal census of 2011, 55,712 people (0.2% of the population of Nepal) were Sunuwar. The frequency of Sunuwar by province was as follows:

- Bagmati Province (0.5%)
- Koshi Province (0.5%)
- Madhesh Province (0.1%)
- Gandaki Province (0.0%)
- Lumbini Province (0.0%)
- Sudurpashchim Province (0.0%)
- Karnali Province (0.0%)

The frequency of Sunuwar was higher than the national average (0.2%) in the following districts:

- Ramechhap (4.2%)
- Okhaldhunga (3.0%)
- Sindhuli (2.7%)
- Ilam (1.3%)
- Taplejung (1.1%)
- Dolakha (1.0%)
- Panchthar (1.0%)
- Udayapur (0.9%)
- Jhapa (0.3%)
- Khotang (0.3%)
- Lalitpur (0.3%)
- Solukhumbu (0.3%)

== Photos ==
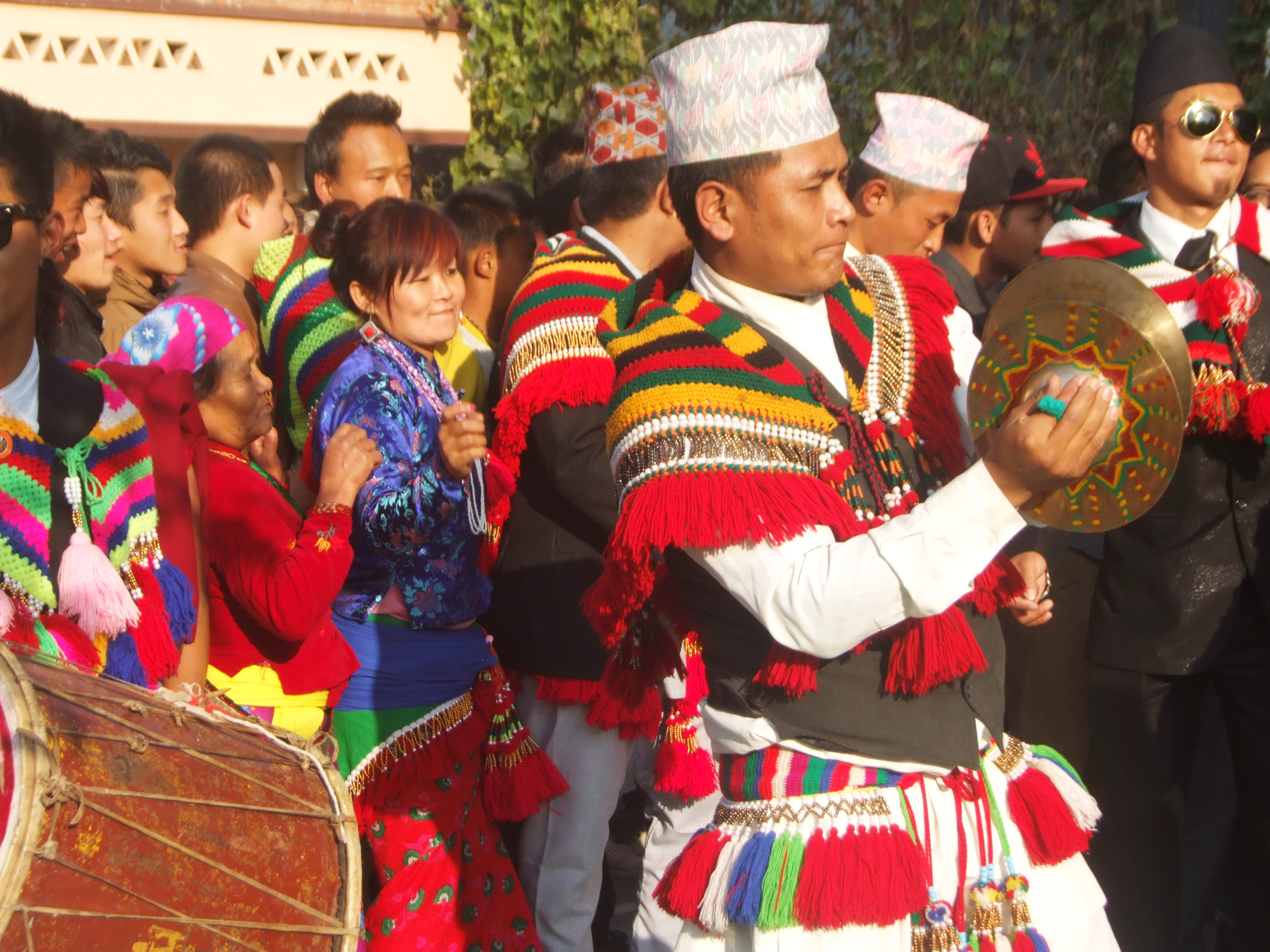
Udhuali

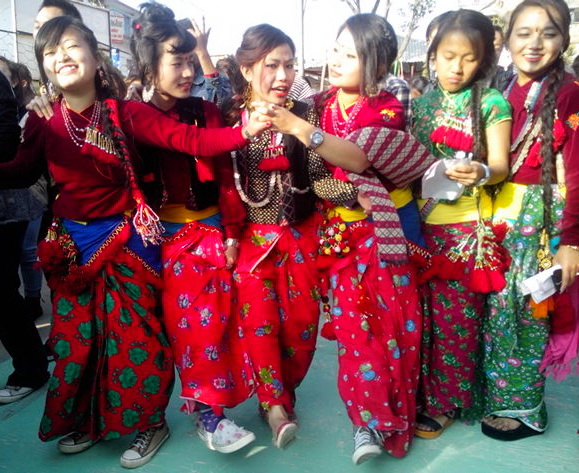
Sunuwar girl

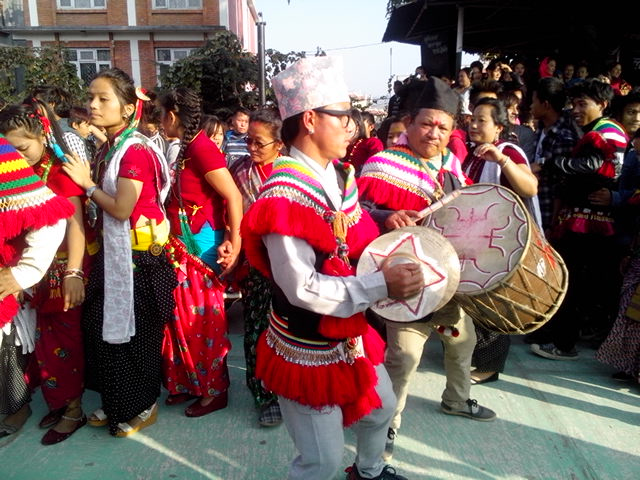
Sunuwar culture

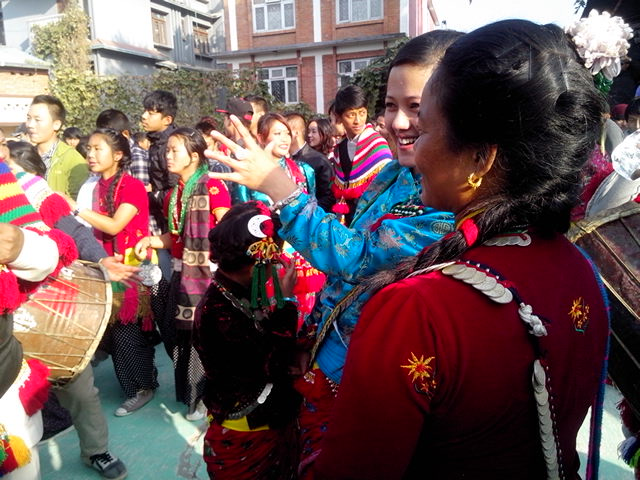
Sunuwar Udhuali Sadhar

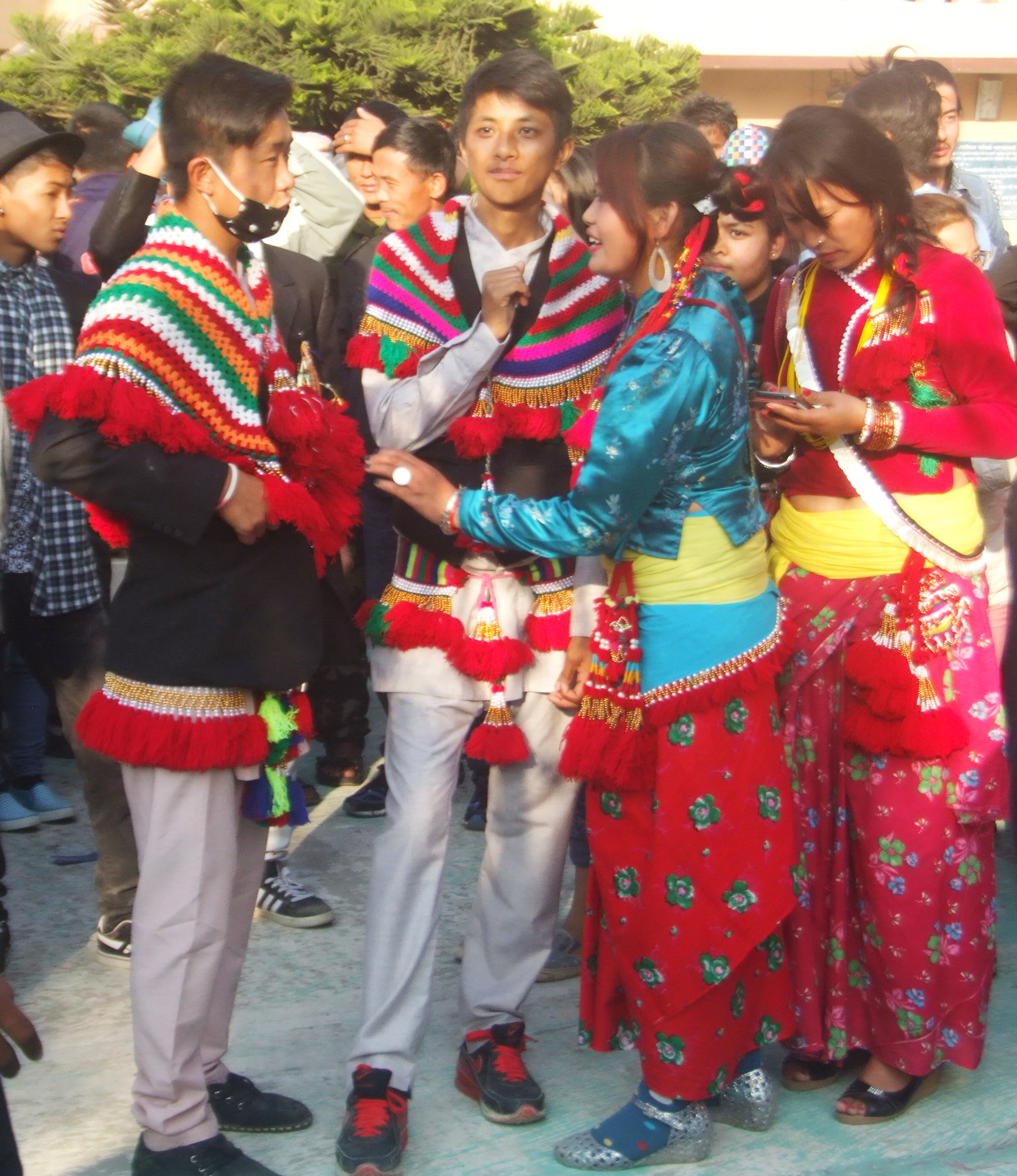
Sunuwar people

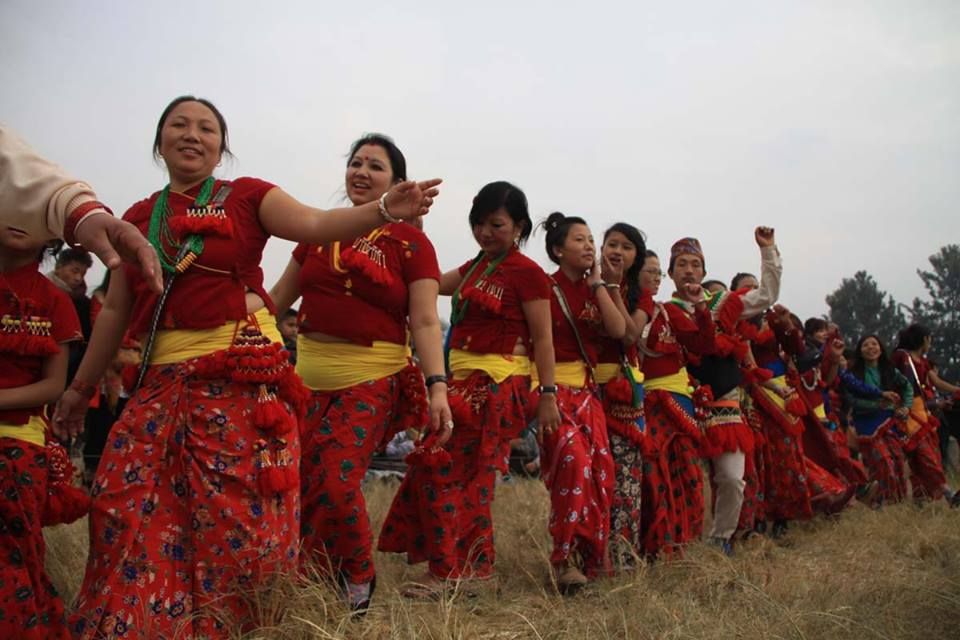
Sunuwar Koich Puki at Tudikhel

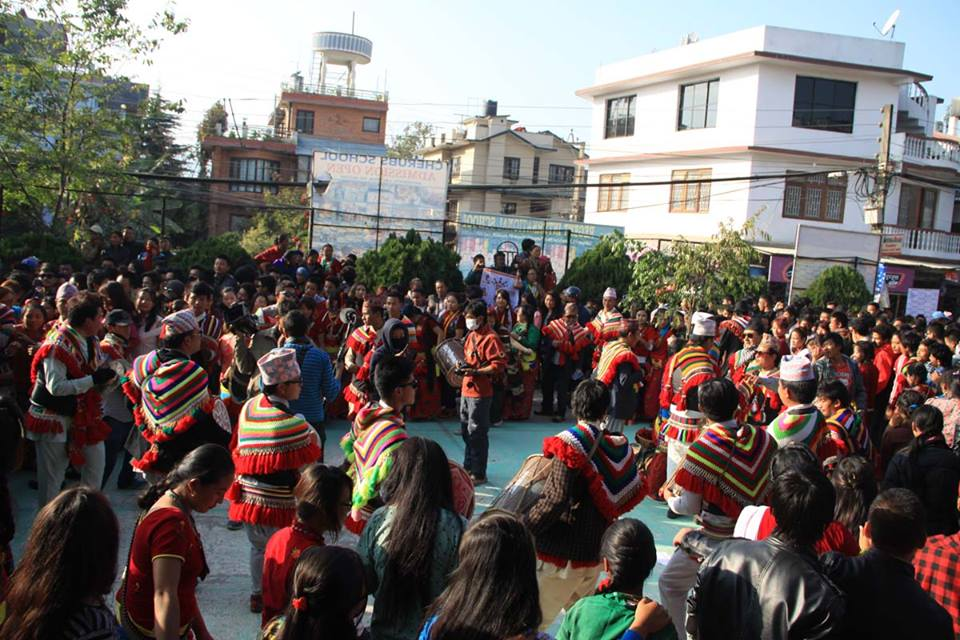
Sunuwar Koich Puki and Nakhipot

== See also ==
- Phalate or Falate
- Khijee or Khiji
- Bhujee
- Prette or Priti
- Ragani
