= Ramechhap District =

Coordinates: 27°20′0″N 86°5′0″E

Ramechhap District रामेछाप
- District
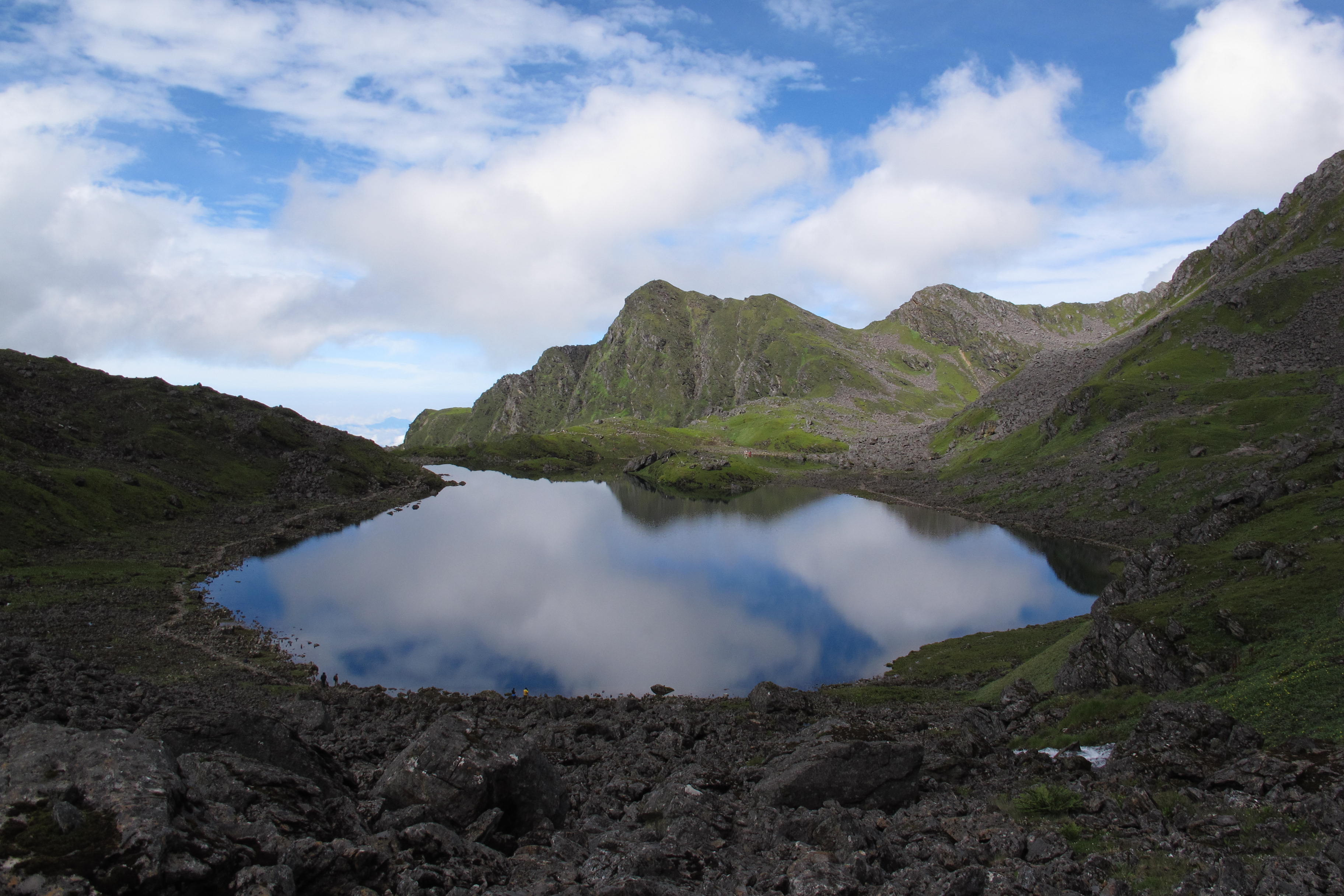
- Panch Pokhari at Ramechhap

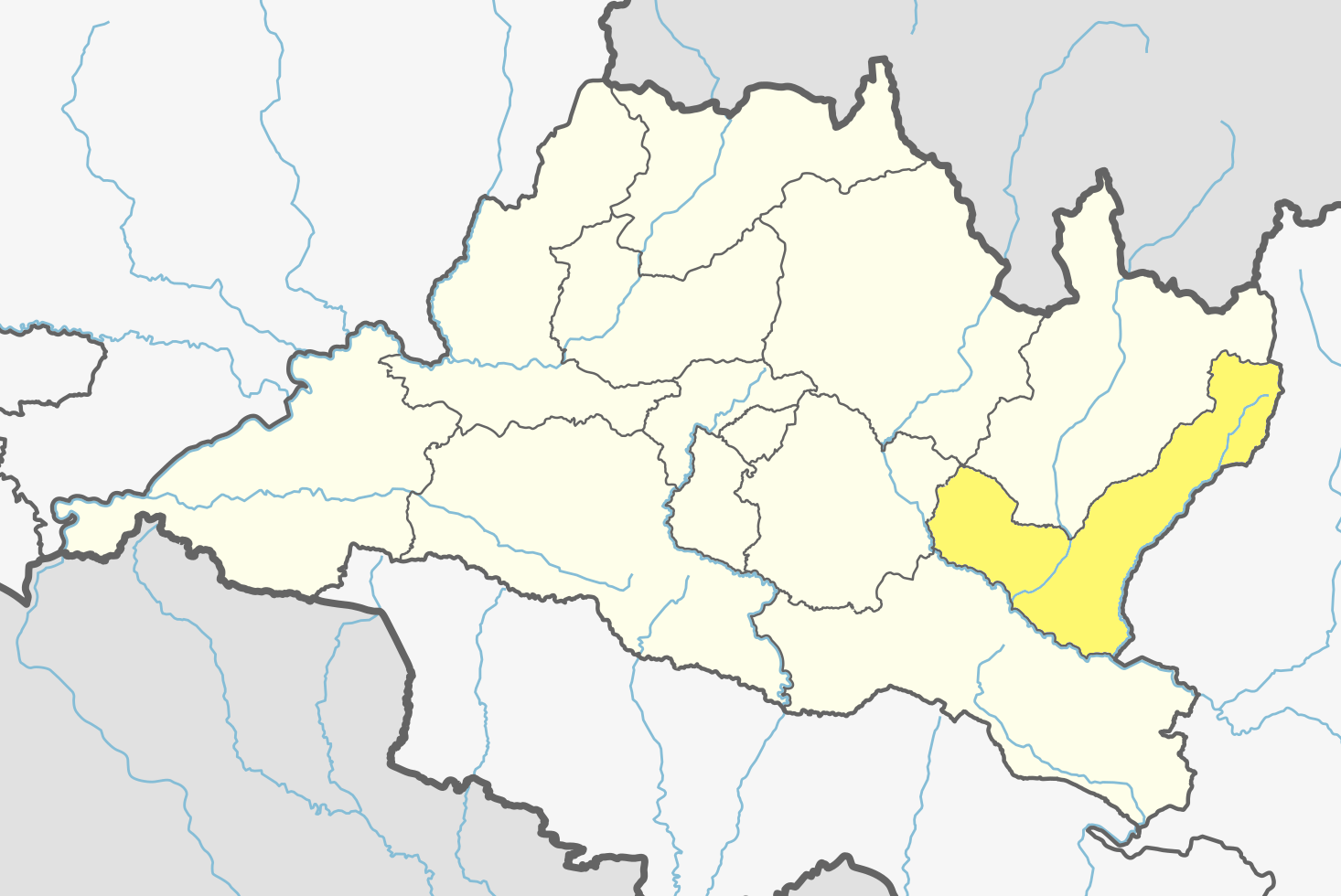
- Location of district in province
- Country: Nepal
- Province: Bagmati Province
- Administrative headquarters: Manthali

Government
  - Type: Coordination committee
  - Body: DCC, Ramechhap

Area
  - Total: 1,546 km^{2} (597 sq mi)

Population (2011)
  - Total: 202,646
  - Density: 131.1/km^{2} (339.5/sq mi)
- Time zone: UTC+05:45 (NPT)
- Main Language(s): Nepali, Magar, Sunuwar, Tamang, Newari and Haayu
- Official Language(s): Nepali
- Website: www.ddcramechhap.gov.np

Ramechhap District (Nepali: रामेछाप जिल्ला), a part of Bagmati Province, is one of the seventy-seven districts of Nepal. The district, also known as Wallo Kirat Ramechhap, has its district headquarters in Manthali and covers an area of 1,546 km^{2} (597 sq mi). In 2011, the district had a population of 202,646 and population density of 137.4 per km^{2} (53.1 per sq mi). It has 11 post offices, with the District Post Office bearing the postal code 45400.

According to EHRP Nepal, the district is made up of eight local municipalities:

- Manthali Municipality
- Ramechhap Municipality
- Umakunda Rural Municipality
- Khandadevi Rural Municipality
- Gokulganga Rural Municipality
- Doramba Rural Municipality
- Likhu Rural Municipality
- Sunapati Rural Municipality.

Ramechhap District has the highest population of the endangered native group the Kusunda and the lowest population growth rate in Nepal.

== Etymology ==
The district was named after Ramechhap village. The word Ramechhap comes from two Nepali words, Ram (person's name) and chhap (mark). According to folklore, the village of Ramechhap was once occupied by the Tamang people. A Tamang member of the village, named Ram, was granted the role of mukhtiyari (village leader) by royal decree. Consequently, land ownership and other legal activities were authorized in the village by the stamp (chhap) of Ram.

According to another legend, the Tamang people used to rear their domesticated animals such as buffalo, goats, etc. in an open meadow in the district. The word ra means 'goat', mey means 'ox', and chhawa means their offspring; the meadow of the ra-mey-chhawa ultimately became "Ramechhap".

== Geography and climate ==
Climate Zone	Elevation Range	% of Area
Upper Tropical	300 to 1,000 meters 1,000 to 3,300 ft.	18.0%
Subtropical	1,000 to 2,000 meters 3,300 to 6,600 ft.	42.1%
Temperate	2,000 to 3,000 meters 6,400 to 9,800 ft.	21.0%
Subalpine	3,000 to 4,000 meters 9,800 to 13,100 ft.	6.7%
Alpine	4,000 to 5,000 meters 13,100 to 16,400 ft.	3.6%
Nival	above 5,000 meters	7.3%

== Demographics ==
Historical population
Census year	Pop.	±% p.a.
1981	161,445	—
1991	188,064	+1.54%
2001	212,408	+1.22%
2011	202,646	−0.47%
2021	170,620	−1.71%
Source: Citypopulation

At the time of the 2021 Nepal census, Ramechhap District had a population of 170,302. 6.48% of the population is under 5 years of age. It has a literacy rate of 68.12% and a sex ratio of 1107 females per 1000 males. 64,666 (37.97%) lived in municipalities.

Castes/ethnic groups in Ramechhap District (2021)
1. Chhetri (26.0%)
2. Tamang (19.7%)
3. Newar (13.5%)
4. Magar (10.8%)
5. Bahun (4.58%)
6. Sunuwar (4.32%)
7. Majhi (3.69%)
8. Sarki (3.46%)
9. Kami (3.08%)
10. Damai (2.52%)
11. Sherpa (2.48%)
12. Bhujel (1.79%)
13. Thami (1.39%)
14. Other Khas non-Dalit (1.23%)
15. Other Hill Janjati (0.92%)
16. Others (0.57%)

Ethnicity wise: Hill Janjatis were the largest group, making up 45% of the population. Tamangs were the largest Hill Janjatis, with Magars being 11% of the population. Chhetri and Bahun made up 20% of the population.

59.4% spoke Nepali in 2011.

Languages of Ramechhap district (2021)
1. Nepali (55.4%)
2. Tamang (18.4%)
3. Nepal Bhasha (7.76%)
4. Magar (6.12%)
5. Sunuwar (4.15%)
6. Majhi (2.98%)
7. Sherpa (2.30%)
8. Thami (1.37%)
9. Others (1.51%)

As their first language, 55.41% of the population spoke Nepali, 18.40% Tamang, 7.76% Newari, 6.12% Magar, 4.15% Sunuwar, 2.98% Majhi, 2.30% Sherpa and 1.37% Thami as their first language. In 2011, 59.4% of the population spoke Nepali as their first language.

Religion in Ramechhap District (2021)
Religion	Percent
Hinduism	70.66%
Buddhism	23.87%
Kirat Mundhum	3.15%
Christianity	2.08%
Other or not stated	0.24%

Religion: 70.66% were Hindu, 23.87% Buddhist, 3.15% Kirati, 2.08% Christian and 0.24% others.

== Old Village Development Committees (VDCs) ==
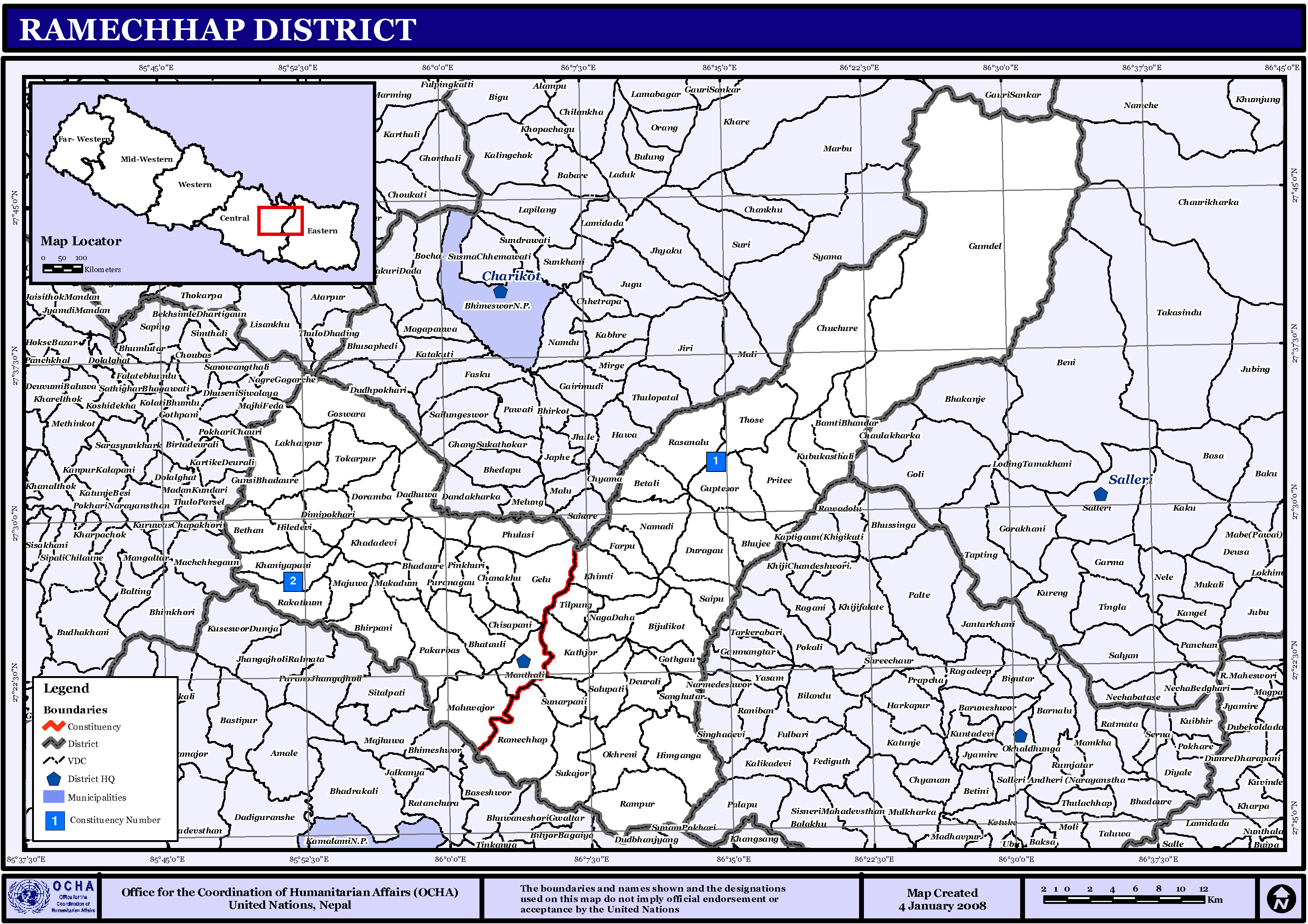
Map of the VDCs in Ramechhap District

- Bamti Bhandar
- Betali
- Bethan
- Bhirpani
- Bhuji
- Bijulikot
- Chisapani Municipality
- Chanakhu
- Chuchure
- Dadhuwa
- Duragaun
- Deurali
- Dimipokhari
- Doramba
- Duragau
- Gagal Bhadaure
- Gelu
- Goswara
- Gothgau
- Gumdel
- Gunsi Bhadaure
- Gupteshwar
- Hiledevi
- Himganga
- Khandadevi
- Khaniyapani
- Khimti
- Kumbukasthali
- Lakhanpur
- Majuwa
- Makadum
- Manthali Municipality
- Naga Daha
- Namadi
- Pakarbas
- Pharpu
- Phulasi
- Piukhuri
- Priti
- Puranagau
- Rakathum
- Ramechhap Municipality
- Rampur
- Rashnailu
- Saipu
- Sanghutar
- Those
- Tilpung
- Tokarpur

== Newly formed local administrative bodies ==
Name	Nepali	Population (2011)	Area (km^{2})	Density (Population/km^{2})
Manthali Municipality	मन्थली नगरपालिका	45,416	100.7	451
Ramechhap Municipality	रामेछाप नगरपालिका	28,612	202.45	141
Umakunda Rural Municipality	उमाकुँण्ड गाउँपालिका	17,601	452	39
Khandadevi Rural Municipality	खाँडादेभी गाउँपालिका	25,761	150.7	170.9
Doramba Rural Municipality	दोरम्वा गाउँपालिका	22,738	140.88	161.4
Gokulganga Rural Municipality	गोकुलगँगा गाउँपालिका	20,074	198.4	101.2
Likhutamakoshi Rural Municipality	लिखु तामाकोशी गाउँपालिका	23,109	124.5	185.6
Sunapati Rural Municipality	सुनापति गाउँपालिका	18,141	86.9	208.7

== Notable people ==
- Sudarshan Gautam, first person with no arms to climb Mount Everest without using prosthetics, doing so in 2013

== See also ==
- Zones of Nepal
- Thangmi language
