= Rai people =

Kiranti ethnic group in Nepal, India, and Bhutan

Rāi
राई
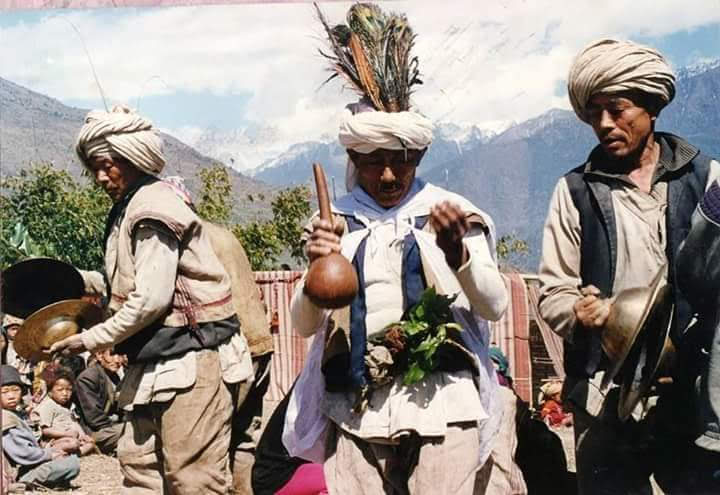
- Nakchhong or Naksho Rai Shaman

Regions with significant populations
- Nepal: 640,671 (2021) List by province: Koshi: 506,422; Bagmati: 112,364; Madhesh: 10,210; Gandaki: 7,599; Lumbuni: 2,628; Sudurpashchim:917; Karnali: 534
- India: 360,916 List by state: West Bengal: 216,043; Sikkim: 80,979; Assam: 43,646; Arunachal Pradesh: 9,046; Meghalaya: 3,705; Uttarakhand: 3,649; Nagaland: 1,813; Himachal Pradesh: 1,593; Mizoram: 445
- Bhutan: 37,311

Languages
- Rai languages; Nepali; Dzongkha

Religion
- Predominantly: 65% Kiratism or Animism; Other Religions: 30% Hinduism, 5% Christianity (2011)

Related ethnic groups
- Limbu; Sherpa; Sunuwar; Yakkha; Hayu; Jirel; Dhimal; Other Sino-Tibetan people

The Rai (Kirati: also known as Jimee or Khambu, Rāi; Devanagari: राई) are an ethnolinguistic group belonging to the Kirat family and primarily Tibeto-Burman speaking linguistic ethnicity. They are Indigenous peoples of eastern parts of Nepal, the Indian states of Sikkim hilly regions of Darjeeling, Kalimpong of West Bengal and in southwestern Bhutan.

The Rai, as a set of groups, are one of the oldest tribes of Nepal. They inhabited the area between the Dudh Koshi and Tamur River in Nepal. Rai are also known as "Khambu" in some places. They are known for worshipping nature and ancestral spirits. Rai are one of the tribes of the Kirati group. They are popularly believed to have offered a stiff resistance to the invasion of the Gorkhas. Kiranti Rai are hill tribes who once possessed considerable power and territory but were reduced to submission by Prithvi Narayan Shah after his conquest of Nepal. Kirati rule in the eastern hills of Nepal ended after the conquest of the Gorkha Kingdom in 1772–1773.

== Geographical distribution ==
=== Nepal ===
Numbering about 750,000 , the Rai people mainly inhabit the eastern part of Nepal. Linguists have identified up to 28 different Rai languages, most of them mutually unintelligible.

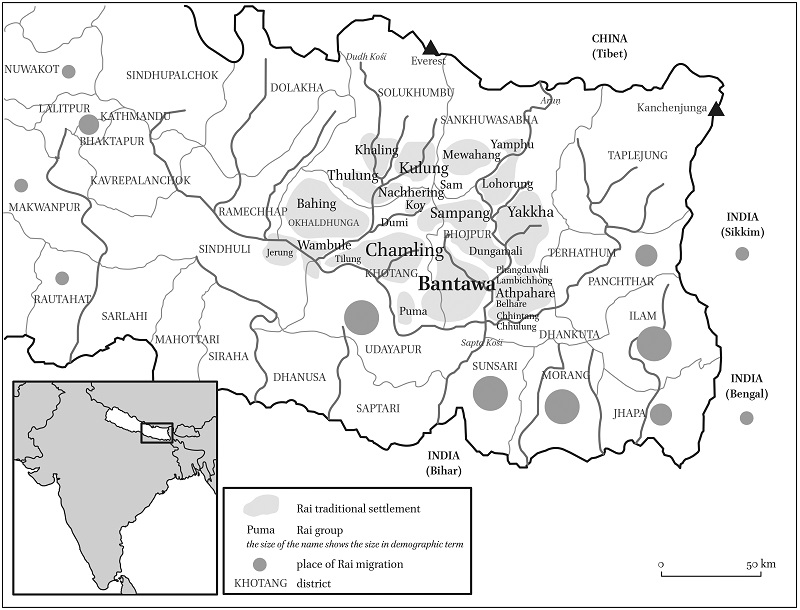
Map.Traditional settlement of Rai Linguistic groups in Eastern Nepal Province No. 1 districts include Khotang, Bhojpur, Solukhambu, Dhankuta, Sankhuwasabha, Okhaldhunga and Ratnawati vdc of Sindhuli District.

Rai traditionally Inhabited districts of Eastern Nepal by linguistic groups are:

- Khotang inhabited by: Chamling, Dumi, Puma, Sampang, Koyu, Nachhiring and Tilung.
- Bhojpur inhabited by: Bantawa, Dungmali, Sampang, Kulung and Mewahang/Newahang.
- Solukhambu inhabited by: Kulung, Khaling, Thulung Nachhiring/Sotang and Bahing/Bayung.
- Sankhuwasabha inhabited by: Yamphu, Mewahang, Lohorung and Kulung
- Dhankuta inhabited by: Athpare, Belhare, Chiling/Chulung, Mugali, Phangduwali and Bantawa.
- Okhaldhunga inhabited by: Wambule, Jerung and Bahing/Bayung.
- Udaypur inhabited by: Chamling, Tilung and Wambule
- Sindhuli inhabited by: Jerung and Wambule
- Makawanpur (Rai gaun) inhabited by: देवास Dewas

2011 Nepal census classifies the Rai people within the broader social group of Mountain/Hill Janajati. At the time of the Nepal census of 2011, 620,004 people (2.3% of the population of Nepal) were Rai. The frequency of Rai people by province was as follows:

- Koshi Province (11.3%)
- Bagmati Province (1.5%)
- Gandaki Province (0.3%)
- Madhesh Province (0.2%)
- Lumbini Province (0.1%)
- Karnali Province (0.0%)
- Sudurpashchim Province (0.0%)

The frequency of Rai people was higher than national average (2.3%) in the following districts:

- Khotang (36.8%)
- Bhojpur (32.1%)
- Ilam (19.8%)
- Dhankuta (19.8%)
- Solukhumbu (19.7%)
- Udayapur (17.3%)
- Panchthar (13.8%)
- Sankhuwasabha (10.7%)
- Okhaldhunga (10.0%)
- Sunsari (6.6%)
- Taplejung (5.1%)
- Morang (4.5%)
- Jhapa (4.7%)
- Nuwakot (3.6%)
- Lalitpur (2.7%)

=== India, Bhutan and other countries ===
Rai predominate in the Indian states of Sikkim, Darjeeling, Kalimpong, Kurseong. Rai is the single largest ethnic community in Sikkim. Rai population is mostly found in the south, west and east of Sikkim. Large number of Rai people are also found living in Assam and other northeastern states of India, the Kingdom of Bhutan, while some have recently migrated to the United Kingdom, Hong Kong, the United States and other countries.

== History ==
=== Mythology of Rai People ===
Rai tradition relates that the first of the ancestral Kirati entered Nepal's eastern hills through the Barahachhetra gorge of the Kosi Valley the natural gateway into the region through the Mahabharat Range, which separates the hilly hinterland from the plains. According to the Mundum, in oral history, Kirati ancestors came out of the "Khuwalung" and then followed the small river of the Saptakoshi. They journeyed through the Arun, Dudh Koshi, Sun Koshi and Tama Koshi and finally settled down in the Bhote Koshi valley.

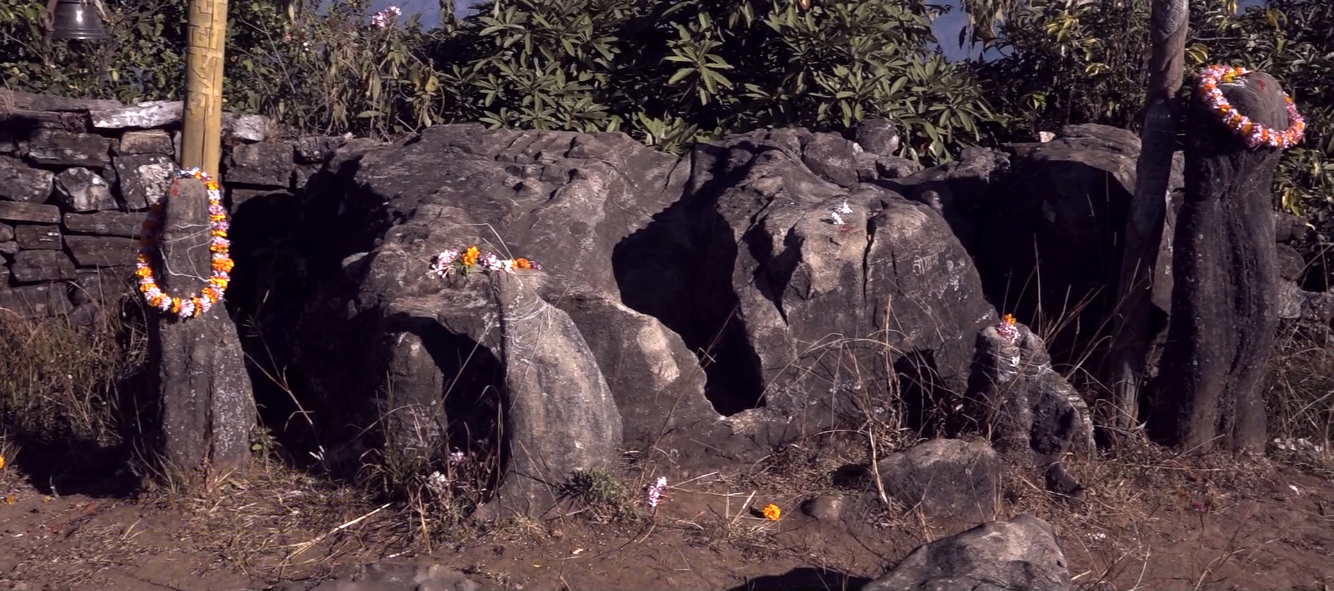
Tuwachung Jayajum Historical pilgrimage site of Rai People

According to the myths of the Kirati Rai people "Tayama" (elder sister), "Khiyama" (younger sister) and "Raichhakule" ( Tayama and Khimaya's younger brother) are supposed to be the primaeval ancestors of the Kirati Rai's Civilization. The sisters are believed to have lived in "Tuwachung" whereas the brother in the cave of Halesi. Tayama and Khiyama were skilful in weaving the looms. They are regarded as the pioneers of textiles. Tayama is recognized by names like: Khew, Toyama, Toma, Tayama, Tangwama, Jauma, Jaumo, Dawa and Kakcha, and accordingly, Khiyama is also called Khema, Khiwama, Khliuma, Khlemo, Khewa, Khauma and Los in distinct Kiranti languages. Raichhakule (younger brother of Tayama and Khimaya) also known as Hetchhakuppa, Hetchhakuwa, Khokchilipa, Khakchhilip etc. is considered to be the beginner of the agricultural era in the cultural history of Kirati- Rai People.

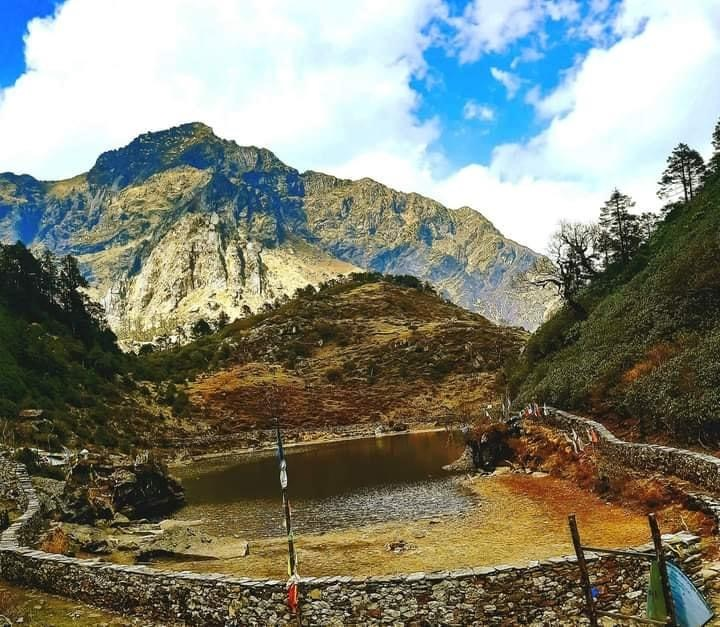
Salpa Pokhari(Pond) and Sillichung Mountain in Bhojpur District Eastern Nepal

Salpa Pokhari is believed to be the origin of Kirati-Rai. Salpa Pokhori is the centre of cultural belief for Kirati Rai and is related to the myth of "Salpa" and "Ribrima"(Salpa King and Queen). so Kirati Rai believed to have been born from these ancestors, Salpa and Ribrima. Salpa Pokhori is very significant and popular among Kirati Rai from cultural and religious views according to the Kirati Rai's myth, this place is the origin of the Kirati Rai people. The Sillichung Mountain known as the prime tribute is supposed to be the origin of "Mundum" according to the Kirati myth.

=== Kirat Dynasty in Kathmandu Valley ===
Nepal enters into real historical era with the conquest of Kathmandu Valley by the Kiratis. The Kiratis are said to have been the aborigines inhabiting Eastern Nepal and having their own administrative set-up. Under the able leadership of their chieftain "Yalung" or Yalambar the Kiratis defeated Bhuwan Singh; the last king in the Ahir Dynasty and brought the Kathmandu valley under their sway. From various sources mentioning Long period altogether 29 to 32 Kirati kings who had ruled over Nepal 1225 years from 800 BCE to 300 AD. Gopal genealogy mentions 32 Kirati Kings to have ruled over Nepal different genealogies have found to be stating different names of last Kirati King. The Lichhavi monarchical dynasty was established in Nepal by defeating last Kirati King 'Khigu', according to Gopal genealogy, 'Galiz' according to language-genealogy and 'Gasti', according to Wright genealogy. Chyasal is the place of final battlefield for Kiratis and Lichhavis. About 250 A.D. Kirati rule end in Kathmandu Valley and Kiratis moved towards east. Various ancient historical, archeological sites related to history of Kiratis and Kirati period in Kathmandu Valley like Chyasal, Patan Durbar, Patuk Don, Gokarna, Thankot, Birupakshya, Lalitpur, Akash Bhairav etc.

=== Kirat Kingdom in the east ===
According to historians the Lichhavis got victory only over Kathmandu. in other parts of the eastern country Kirati rule is still maintained. After the defeated Kiratis by Lichhavis in Kathmandu valley the Kiratis moved gradually east wards ruling in the small territories. In the process of expansion Kiratis extended from Banepa, Dulikhel, Sindupalchok, Darawardanda, Dolakha, Charikot to Kiratichap. Kiratis built a fort in Kiratichap and started to rule again still many evidences of Kiratis ancient ruins graveyard can be found in Dolakha, Sindupalchok region like "Kirat Thursa" in Jiri "Kiratichap" in Dolakha. according to various folklore and oral history Lichhavi attacked again Kiratis in Dolakha and chased away. In Pursuit of the fertile land some kiratis followed Sunkoshi river they become Sunuwar. others who followed the Tamakoshi, Dudhkoshi, Arun and Tamur rivers they become today's Rai, Yakkha, Sunuwar and Limbu . After settling down in different areas Kiratis made their appropriate 'Kipat,' 'the area,' and again in the mountain region eastern hills Kiratis ruled over for centuries. in course of time due to the geo-political division three Kirati states were created as Wallo Kirat(Near Kirat), Majh Kirat (Middle Kirat) and Pallo Kirat or (Far east Kirat).

=== Gorkhali conquest in Kirat country ===
Around 1743 AD King Prithvi Narayan Shah of Gorkha started to Unification of Nepal campaign, conquering many small states Gorkhalis also started to attacked in the Kirat Region. according to historians, before the unification of Nepal by Prithvivinaryan Shah from Banepa to Trishuli River and around Teesta River known as Kiratdesh the territory of Kiratis. Looking at the evidence of the time when Prithvinarayan Shah expanded the Gorkha kingdom, Dolakha, Ramechhap and Sindhuli fall in Wallo Kirat and the part from Sunkoshi to upper Arun river falls in Manjh Kirat . The area from Upper Arun Arun river to East Teesta River falls within Pallo Kirat . when Prithvi Narayan Shah invaded the Dhulikhel border area of (Wallo Kirat) in 1768 AD, that time the Kirat King of Dhulikhel Chaukhat Mahindra Sing Rai and his brother Namsing Rai strongly resisted and fought valiantly with Prithivinarayan shah's huge army for a very long time. King Prithvi Narayan Shah had deployed Sardar Ram Krishna Kunwar to the invasion of Kirant regional areas comprising; Pallo Kirant, Wallo Kirant and Majh Kirant. There are many kings and chiftens and forts under Wallo Kirat and Majh Kirat area.

At the time when Prithivi Narayan Shah fought the Kirat region. In this historical period, Waling Hang was the king in Hatuwā Gaḍhi(Majh Kirat) in across the Arun River. The kings of Hatuwa extended their rule over part of Khalsa. The Khalsa territory present day Ankhisalla, Dhankuta District ruled by King Budhahang. Budhahang disappeared when Prithivi Narayan Shah attacked him. It is said that during the war with the Shah king, he could revive dead Kirati warriors who were killed. On 29 August 1772, Ram Krishna Kanwar crossed Dudhkoshi river enter Chaudandi to invade of Kirant and Saptari region with fellow commander Abhiman Singh Basnyat.

Khambu Kirati Youths who were skilled archers, stemmed the advance of the Gorkhali troops at every step with their arrows. they inflicted heavy losses on the Gorkhalis, so that Prithivinarayan Shah had to send reinforcement sounder the commend of Subedar Shiva Narayan Khatri. Chatim Rai of Rawa Khola and Atal Rai of Pamakham were two principal Khambus Kirati ultimately proved ineffective before, the bows and arrows of the Gorkhalis. within a period of 5 months the Gorkhalis occupied Rawa, Halesi, Majuwa, Kulum and Dingla thus conquering the hole of Majh Kirat.

== Culture ==
Rai Community has its own traditional culture and rituals. all Rai people practice same rituals of life from birth to death. but there are some variation in rites and rituals in Rai communities living in different places.

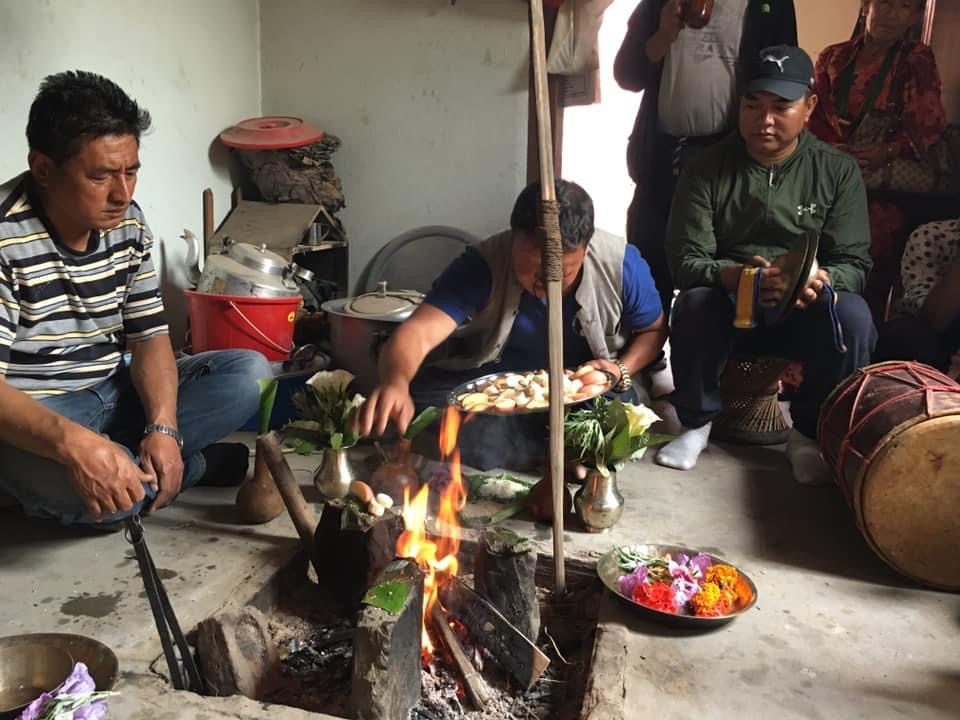
Rai People doing ancestral ritual at “Suptulung” Suptulung is a sacred place where all the Life Cycle cultural ritual activities of Rai community perform

=== Marriage system ===
Marriage in Rai group is not merely a biological and psychological relation between the couple, but essentially considered a social phenomenon that must be approved by the society. Unless the society gives recognition to the couples, they find their marital relation insecure. After the marriage, the woman's clan is not changed, though she stays with her husband; but her children follow the clan of her husband. Both the practices of monogamy and polygamy are found among Rai; but the system of polygamy has declined greatly for legal reason and due to change of attitude.

Some traditional important types of marriage found among Rai are:

a) Chori Biha (theft marriage): It is called Chori Biha by Rai. If a man takes a woman away from her home secretly without informing her parents, it is called 'theft marriage'. This sort of marriage is a bit different from 'love marriage', in that the man and woman may not have developed personal relationship for a long time, which is found in love marriage. The man may like the woman all of a sudden, which the woman may not be noticing. All of a sudden, the man expresses his wish to marry her when he meets her on some occasion or gathering – like in the fairs and marketplace. In such a case, if some of her relatives or close friends encourage her to elope with the man, she may be convinced and becomes ready to go with him.

Nowadays theft marriage is gradually being replaced by 'love marriage', in which the concerned boy and girl spend some time to know each other without the influence or intervention of anybody; then they can either decide to marry, just maintain their friendship or discontinue it, depending on how far the two parties like or dislike each other.

b) Zari Biha (marriage by paying penalty): Taking the wife of another man away in her consent for the purpose of marriage is called Zari Biha in Rai community. In such a case, a certain amount of cash is paid as a penalty by the woman's new husband to the earlier one.

c) Senzi Zari Biha (widow marriage): In Rai community, there is not any social prohibition for the widows to marry. A widow or widower is allowed to get married, though it is not a compulsion. In this marriage, a certain penalty is paid to the widow's father-in-law or the senior family member, as a compensation for losing a member of the family.

d) Magi Biha (arranged marriage): Arranged marriage is performed with the mutual understanding and arrangements of both the families – the boy's side and the girl's side. It is called Magi Biha. In this marriage, the consent of the girl, the forthcoming bride, is a must.

=== Death ritual ===
In Rai community death is distinguished between the natural death and unnatural death in their rites of the passage as well. In the case of natural death, the body is either buried or cremated, upon the wish of the dead person. But the body must be buried in the case of unnatural death. There are many formalities in the death ritual if it is the natural death; but such formalities are less in the case of unnatural death, since it is believed that such a death turns the person into evil.

If a baby dies before the growth of his/her tooth, the funeral rite observed is very simply. Such a death is considered a bad omen and categorized under unnatural death. The pollution and purification rituals are completed on the same day in such cases

If a pregnant woman dies, her lower abdomen is bisected with a bamboo knife and the child is removed from her body. The mother and the child are buried at different burial sites according to the ritual of unnatural death. The pollution and purification ritual is completed on the same day. In the case of natural death, complete funeral rite is observed; and pollution and purification rituals are strictly followed. among Rai community a salt eating and oil drinking ceremony is performed three days after the death. On the ninth and tenth days, a Mangpa(Shaman) performs a merit making ceremony for the deceased. This ritual is done to put the deceased soul to a rest; otherwise, it is believed that the deceased person's spirit will bring harm to the family.

=== Family and kinship ===
Rai have the practice of living in both the nuclear and joint families. In the nuclear family, there are two generations of people, whereas a joint family has three or more generations living together by sharing the same house and kitchen. Normally the son does not get separated immediately after his marriage. But after the marriage of his younger brother, he may wish to live separately. At the time of separation, the parental property is divided equally between the parents and sons.

Mainly three forms of kinship are found among Rai: i) kinship by blood; e.g. brother and sister, ii) kinship by marriage; e.g. father-in-law, sister-in-law, etc., iii) kinship by social relation; e.g. Miteri (friendship bond established after a special ritual) relation.

Kinship behaviour varies according to the status of the kin. Some relatives are more respectable than others, while some are in 'joking relation'. For instance, father, mother, uncle and aunt are respectable, but solti-soltinee, sali-bhena, are all in joking relation. In Rai community, son-in-law and daughter-in-law are treated equally as the son or daughter of the family.

=== Gender issues and decision-making procedure ===
Men and women having equal status in the family and community, there is almost no gender discrimination in Rai society. Although man is usually the head of the family, woman's role is equally important in planning and decision making on domestic matters. The husband decides almost nothing in absence of his wife. They generally discuss to plan the daily activities collectively in the family after dinner; and decision is made thereupon.

After a year of the death of her husband, a widow can wear her casual dresses. There is no restriction for the widow or widower regarding their clothing. They also have the freedom for remarriage; but whether to marry or not depends entirely on the widow's or widower's wish. An unmarried adult woman possesses very strong role in the family. She is heard by all.

Male and female members of family share their labour in all sorts of activities. However, a few cases are exceptions; e.g. cooking meals, which is mostly considered the responsibility of women. But when women are very busy, men take the responsibility of cooking as well. Similarly, though ploughing the field is generally considered the work of men, unmarried girls are also found involved in it to support men in their work.

=== Attire and ornaments ===
==== Women ====
Rai women used to weave homespun cloth from the khadi, cotton, wool and allo nettle plant.

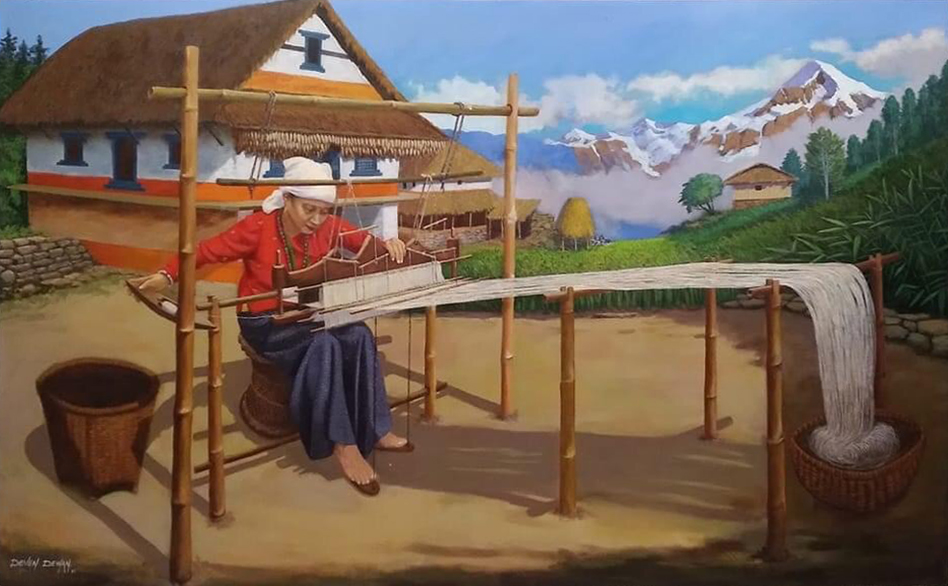
Weaving painting of Rai women

==== Men ====
Rai men wear Wachinari Mala (Dzi bead), Potlung (Puwalo Mala) garland, and animal tooth necklaces. Male dress comprises headgear (feta; pagari; sayabung); Betebung shirt (dawm; lockchham); pant (suruwal; langsup); sleeveless coat made of stinging nettle plant fiber (chhakchha; fenga); waistband (narimokty); (patuki, chakchhinma), a large knife (khukuri, dabhay).

== Religion ==
The Rai have been following the Kirat religion since ancient times. This is based on animistic nature and ancestor worship. Rai do not believe in heaven or hell, and there is no religious hierarchy. Kirati Rai engage Nakchong, Mangpa, Bijuwa, Nakso, their tribal shamans, in their religious rites. Recently the Rai have increasingly borrowed elements from the major religions with which they have had contact, such as Lamaist Buddhism and Nepalese Hinduism, without however renouncing their own tribal traditions. According to the Nepali Census of 2011 AD (2068 BS), roughly one third of Rai people follow Hinduism (30%), two thirds follow Kirat Mundhum Dharma (65%), while 5% are Christians.

=== Suptulung: Places of sacred worship ===
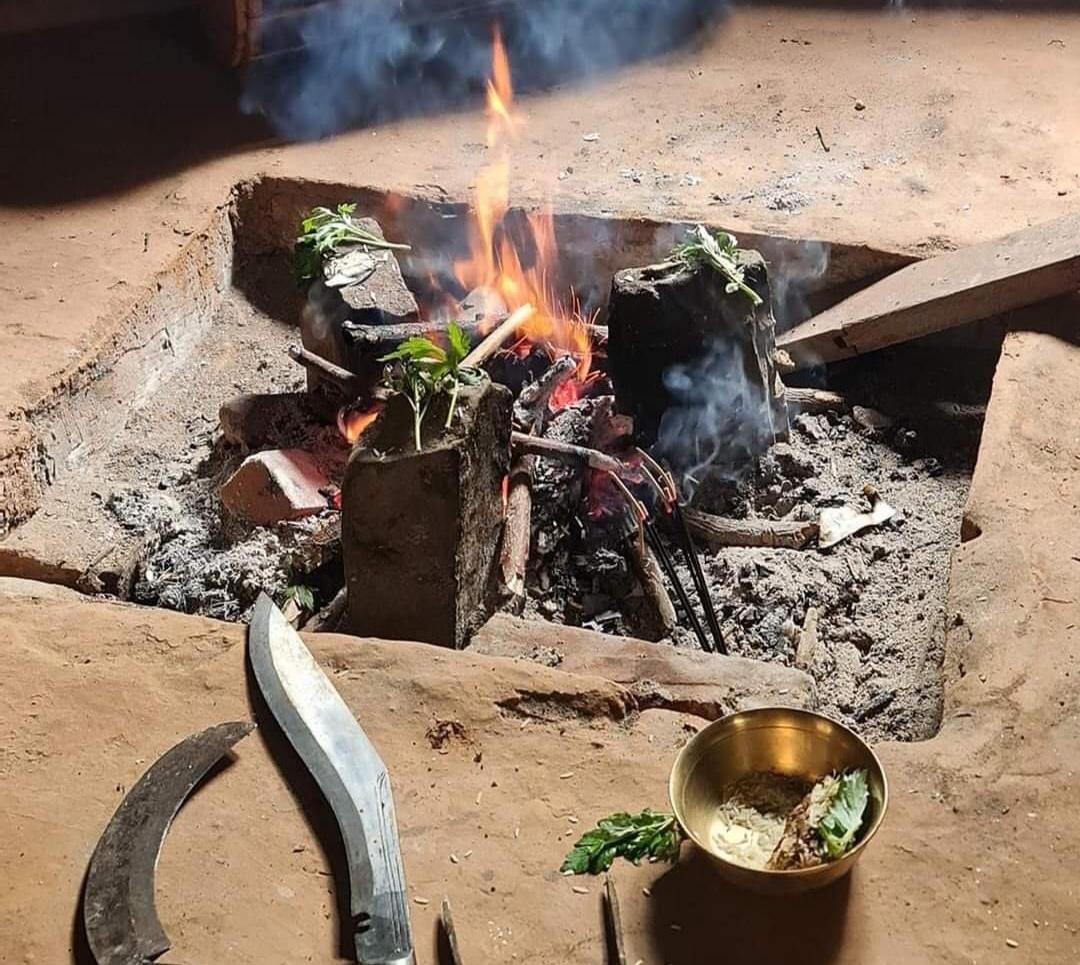
Suptulung/Samkhalung:Teen Chula Dhunga, the three hearthmade stone sacred worship place of the Rai People

Teen Chula or Chula Dhunga "The three hearth made stones" called Dayahulung or Suptulung is the central part all the rituals or rites of Rai practised from birth to death are done in this Teen Chula 'Suptulung' The major deity of all Rai is 'Teen chula' (Suptulung) The three hearthmade stoned oven' of the house. "The Term Lu or Lung refers to the stone and thus the suffix like lu or lung is found in most of the names of the oven in house eg; Taplelung, Suptulung, Mayalung, Ghewalung etc. Almost every thing from the right beginning of birth 'cradle to the tomb' is performed on the sacred teen chula without Teen Chula no rituals can be done. In Rai culture, Teen Chula is the gate-way to enter in the real and practical day to day life. There is (Suptulung) 'Teen Chula' in every house of Rai. It is buried on one side of the inner corner of the house. It said that "Dash Rai Dash Bhasa Ek Chula" "There is Same Teen Chula of all ten diversified Rai" it is believed that in the beginning there is only Ten 'Thars' of Rai but later Rai are divide into many 'thars' sub-group Teen Chula (Suptulung) is the Tribal identity of Rai and its a symbol of unity of different diviersified Kirati Rai in one ethnic family. Teen Chula(Suptulung)also known as Samkhalung in bantawa Rai dialect The word "Samkha" means ancestors and "Lung" means stones. Samkhalung the three main stones,

1. Papalung: symbolizing male ancestors,
2. Mamalung: symbolizing female ancestors, and
3. Ramilung: symbolizing societal spiritual energies.

The Teen Chula are considered by the Rai to be their most important shrines Teen Chula is sacred place after death where the departed souls ancestors of the Rai live in this place. Teen Chula philosophy (three knowledge perspectives) as the distinctive original identity of Rai.

=== Folk gods and goddesses ===
Kirati Rai are basically animist they worship various Household deity and Nature deities.

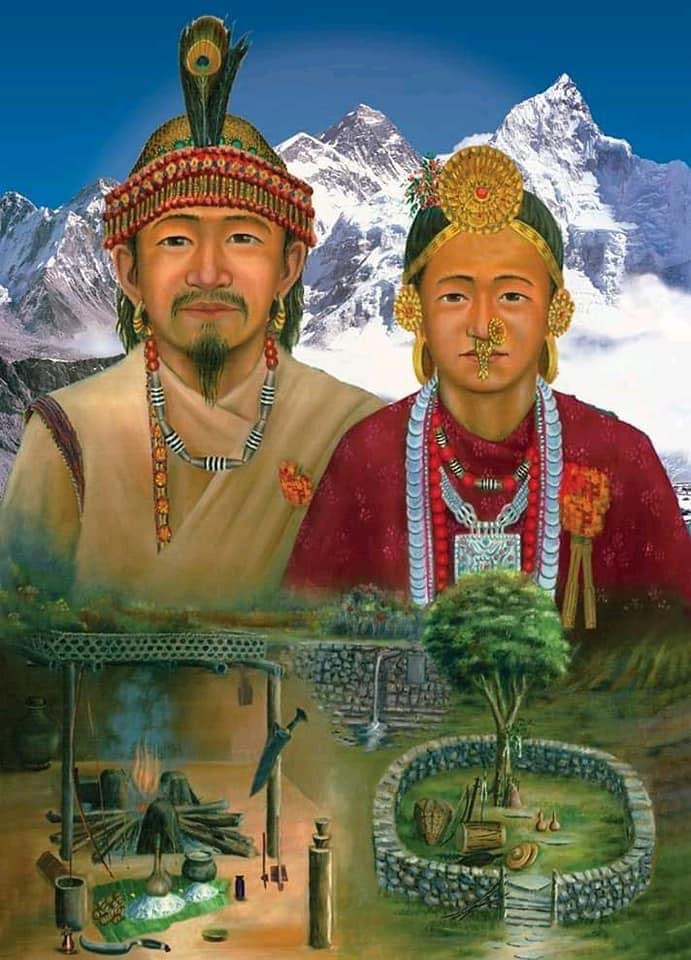
Sumnima and Paruhang as the archetypal proto female and proto male Kirati Rai's supreme deity is Sumnima-Paruhang. Sumnima is a female goddess which is believed to be the Mother Earth (Mother Nature) and Paruhang is a male god also known as the king Sky God.

Kirati Rai worship as ancestral god and goddess to Sumnima and Paruhang. Sumnima also known as 'Hengkhamma' the Mother Earth and Paruhang also known as 'Ninamma' Father the Sky god. The Sumnima is the supreme female God, wife of the Paruhang She represents the earth and ancestral mother. Paruhang is the supreme male God, husband of the Sumnima, lords of flowers. Sumnima-Paruhang are the deities of creator, preserver and sustainer god and goddess of the Rai. These deities are sometimes conflated with the Shaivist deities of Nepalese Hinduism, primarily Shiva and Parvati, although they are distinct in origin.

=== Rai shamanism ===
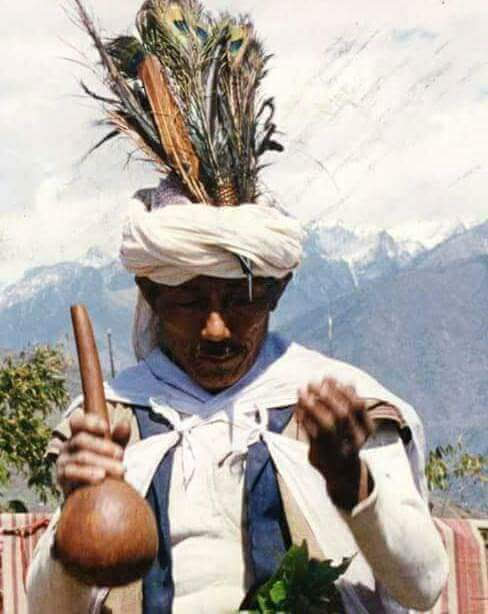
Rai Shaman Eastern Nepal

Rai shamanism comprises a plurality of shamanic traditions, varied but closely related, like the Rai groups themselves. The Rai in East Nepal consist of numerous subtribes, and even though they speak different languages and have their own distinct traditions, they all share a common linguistic and cultural heritage. Together with Limbu (the language of a related group residing farther to the east, also in Sikkim and Darjeeling), the Kirati Rai languages belong to the Kiranti family, which is a subgroup of Tibeto-Burman. Culturally the Rai have been influenced by both Hinduism and Tibetan Buddhism, but these influences have only marginally affected their ancestral traditions, in which shamanic features still figure prominently.

=== The Mundum ===
The "mundum" is the oral tradition among the Rai and it is also a long-standing, and ancient, though not unchanging, ritual practice. Mundum is also addressed as "Ridum" "Muddum" or "Pelam". Iiterally, "Muna" means "Man" and "dum" means talk" which can be said speaking of man or oral talking as a hole the mundum is an oral tradition. so, it may differ in place to place. The term mundum is generally pronounced as mundhum by Nepali speakers. Many researchers have documented the term mundhum in their research. The /dh/ sound in mundum is not found in many Kirati languages. If it is found in other Kirati languages, it often is a loan sound. The term mundhum thus might be of Nepali influence. So, the native term is "mundhum”. In this case, the term mundum changes into the mundhum because the alveolar is changed into the dental aspirated /dh/ because it might be the influence of the Nepali language. Although, the concept is the same, the term mundum has different variants among different subgroups of Rai. Gaenszle (2002: 40–42), who has done pioneering work in the field of Kirati ritual, has extensively studied about it and collected different terms, which are as follows:

- Mundhum: Chintang, Bantawa, Belhare
- Muddum/Mudum: Mewahang, Bantawa, Sampang
- Mindum/Pe-lam: Yamphu
- Ridum: Kulung
- Mundum : Chamling
- Pe-lam: Lohorung

== Rai tribes and clans ==
Rai have distinct cultural tradition. The community is divided into different subtribes called "Thar", all have their own distinctive language or dialect. This division of Rai into various subtribes allows for the minor alterations in the ritualistic practices, while the essence of the traditions remains mostly homogeneous. Within the "Thar" there are clan division called "Pacha"(pa=papa/father and cha=children). Clans are exogamous. There is further classification within the Pacha known as "Samet", Samet traces the relationship of a person to his/her ancestor. Pacha and Samet is main ritual identity of Rai, which is compulsory needed in every ritual performance.

== Languages ==
The Rai languages are members of the Sino-Tibetan language family. They belong to the Kiranti group of the Tibeto-Burman languages branch of the Sino-Tibetan family. In the Nepal National Census of 2011, roughly 800,000 respondents declared a Kiranti languages as their "mother tongue". The number of speakers is probably less than this. The Census of India (2001) reported 50,000 speakers of Limbu and Rai in India (most in Sikkim) Linguistic Survey of India n.d.).

== Festivals ==
=== Sakela ===
Sakela is the gathering of Rai people for the celebration of Udhauli and Ubhauli. Sakela is actually affiliated with Chamling people of Kirati Rai community. Since the identity of different groups of Rai are at depleting, many Rai are taking Sakela as the main festival of Rai. However, truth remains that Sakela is a dance performed during Udhauli and Ubhauli while Rai people gather together. The Rai people (Chamling group) call it by different names like Sakenwa, Sakela, Tosh or Toshi, Bhume, Sakel, Wass, Segro, Sakewa, Dhuulu, Phagulak, Gelang, Gayapuja among different linguistic groups. This event is performed for 15–15 days in a year as ubhauli(Dhirinam) in full moon day of the Baisakh and udhauli(Chhirinam), in full moon day of Mangsir in Kirati Rai villages.

The major philosophy of Sakela is nature worship; importance is placed on paying tribute to ancestors to whom current generations owe their existence. Since Kirati people consider themselves the followers of the nature, they celebrate Udhauli and Ubhauli with sakela to worship sky, earth, rivers, and forest on the one hand; they pay tribute towards the deceased members of their family on the other hand.

During sakela, the dance known as silli is performed. Silli varies from village to village in the beating of jhyamta cymbals and dhol. The choreography of silli depicts important daily activities, and explains the traditional origins of agricultural practices such as digging, tilling, weeding and farming cotton. Likewise, the imitation of the birds and animals is also performed in lively silli. Other activities like worshiping the tap and sun are depicted in the sillis and in the spiritual sillis, the ancestors, like "Tayama-Khiyama", hunter, Chasum, Narawa, "Paruhang-Nayuma" are shown in dance.

The Kirati ancestor "Hetchhakuppa" is considered to be the first performer of silli. Around 45 silli are claimed to be in the existence even today.

=== Nwagi ===
Nwagi is celebrated before eating the harvested food crops. Kirati Rai cleans the ancestral room (Suptulung), and various new crops are offered to the ancestors during Nwagi puja. Nwagi puja also known as (Pirtri puja) ancestor worship, it is believed that new food crops will not be eaten until the Nwagi puja or without being offered to the ancestors. Nwagi puja is all about offering new food of the year to the ancestors' cooking a lot of varieties of food (including alcohol) to offer to the ancestors. this puja is performed by a priest or elder people (male) of the house performing all the rituals. During the Nwagi celebration, family relatives are also invited to the house, different kinds of food and alcohol are served to the guests, relatives chat with each other and the day ends with a farewell. Kirati Rai calls the Nwagi puja by different names and performs it in different ways.

=== Yele ===
Yele Sambat also known as "Yaledong" By Rai People Maghe Sankranti also celebrate same day. The Yele Sambat calendar is named after the first Kirat king Yalambar. It is said that this calendar started when the Kirat king Yalambar defeated the Gopal dynasty in the Kathmandu Valley. The Yele Sambat calendar begins on 15 January. This new year day is also celebrated as Maghe Sankranti in Nepal when people eat sweet potato and various kinds of yams and sel roti.

=== Other festivals ===
- Wadangmi Festival: Wadangmi is a Major Festival of Rai Community of Khalsa Region of Dhankuta District "Wadangmi" also known as "Papani" this festival started from Kartik Purnima and continues up to fifteen days .
- Dhwangkum Festival: "Dhwangkum" is a cultural festival celebrated in the origin place of Wambule Rai. It is also called Dhwangkum. According to the Hindu calendar, Janai Purnima is celebrated on a date. As it usually falls in August, it is also called Bhadau Purnima. Wambule calls this date "Dhwangkum Purne" In Dhwangkumo, Libju Upo (Libju Baje), Bhumju Upo (Bhumju Baje), Dibju Upo (Dibju Baje), Sisi Sikari, Earth(Dharti), Sky(Akash) and the ancestors are worshiped.
- The Saune Sankranti festival is celebrated in the Nepali month calendar Shrawan

== Folk songs and dances ==
Tody in the field of Nepali music, vocal lyrics dance and other arts the Kirati- Rai occupied a large space. Specially Eastern Nepali folk music mostly influence from Rai community.

=== Folk songs ===
Rai community has numerous cultural rituals. The community stores a vast number of chham 'songs' which are sung for different purposes on specific occasions.

- "Hiyari Chham" is a special song that is performed on the occasion of the wedding ceremony in the Rai community. this song is a questions and answer song sung both male and female during wedding occasion. This song is sung in "Sungkhim" a (temporary or new house for guests). it is found that singing is done in some places even when the guests are leaving.
- "Saima Chham" is a song of birth, life and living and it is sung at work and at the waterpoint etc. Saimachham sung specially by women.
- "Hakpare Chham" can also be taken as a folk song in Kirant Rai community. This song can be sung anywhere and by anybody and in anytime.hakpare chham is popular folk song specially in Yamphu, Lohorung and Mewahang Rai community
- "Laibari/Lamwari Chham" is one of the ancient original folk song of the Rai. In Bantawa Rai language "Laam" means Root "Wa"Means Water and "Ri" means Song "life song of rivers and streams".this folk song is an endangered already extinct these days.

=== Folk dances ===
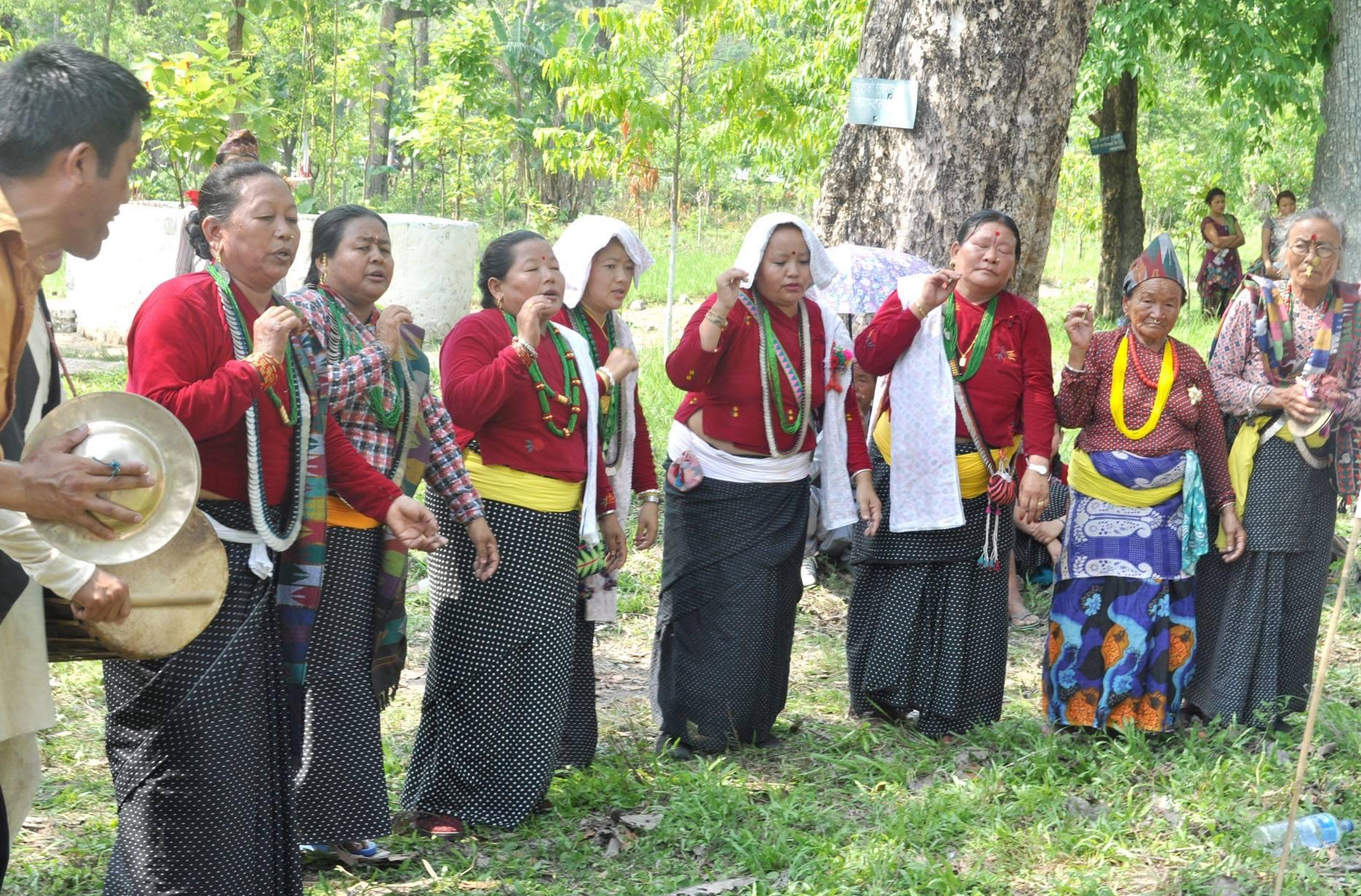
Sakenwa Silli dance

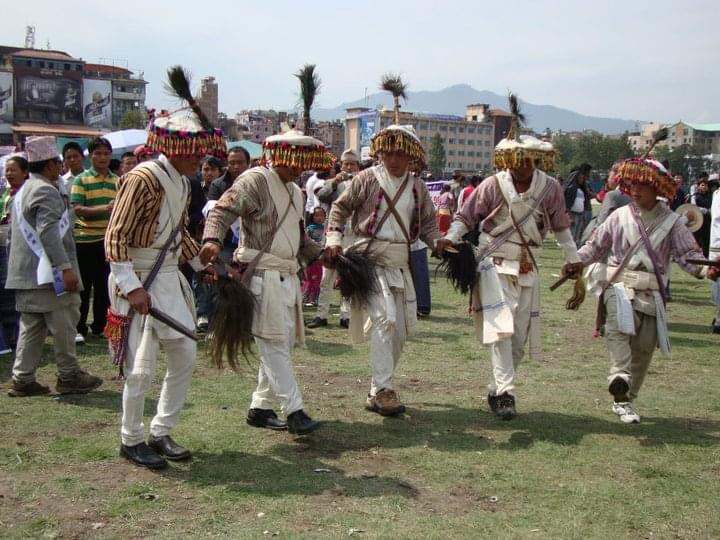
(Segro)Hang silli dance

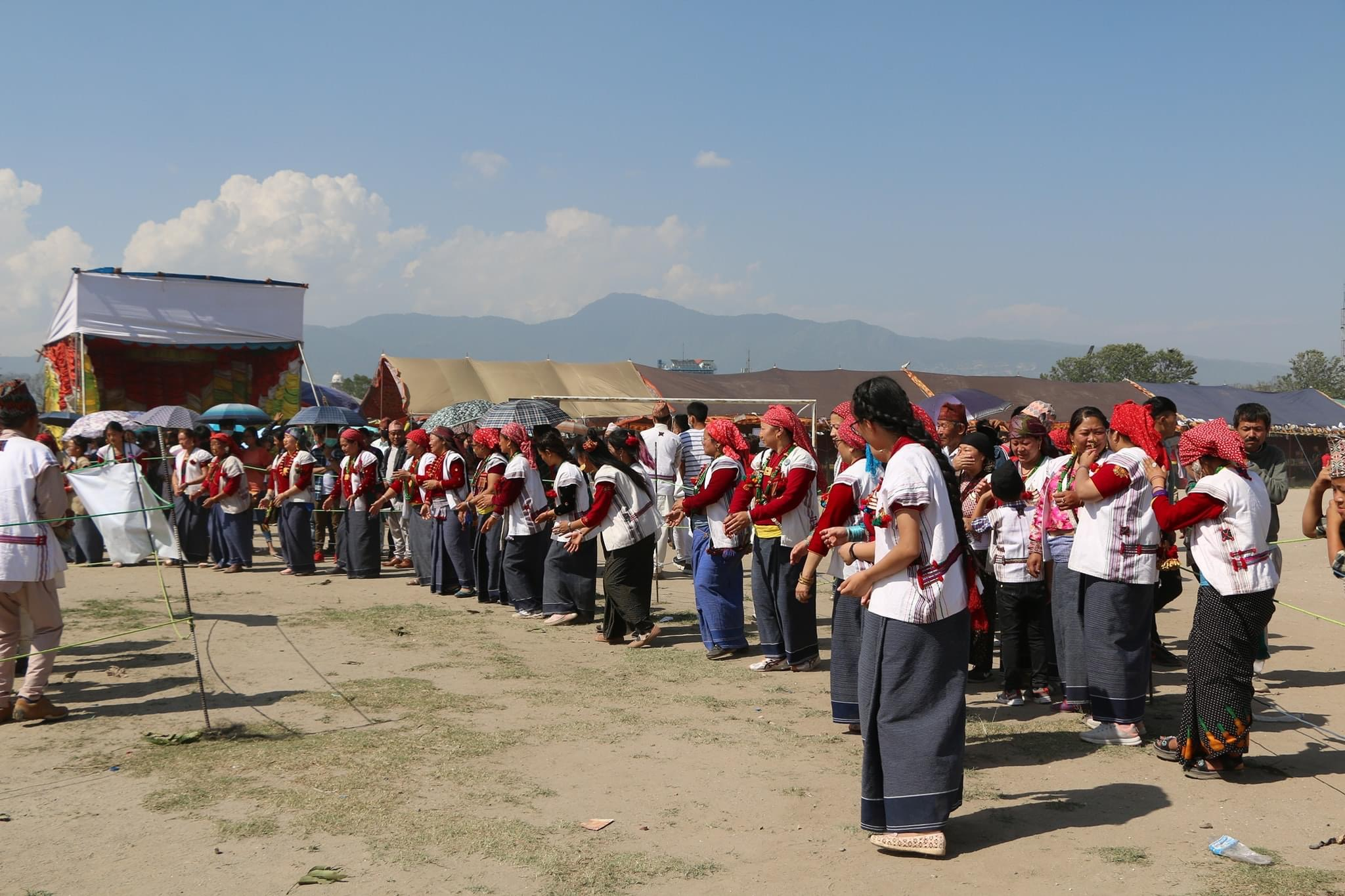
Wass silli dance

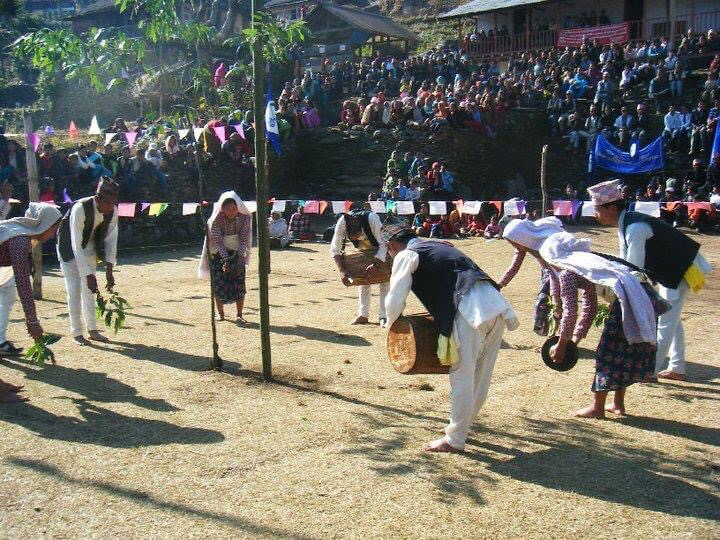
Gelang silli dance

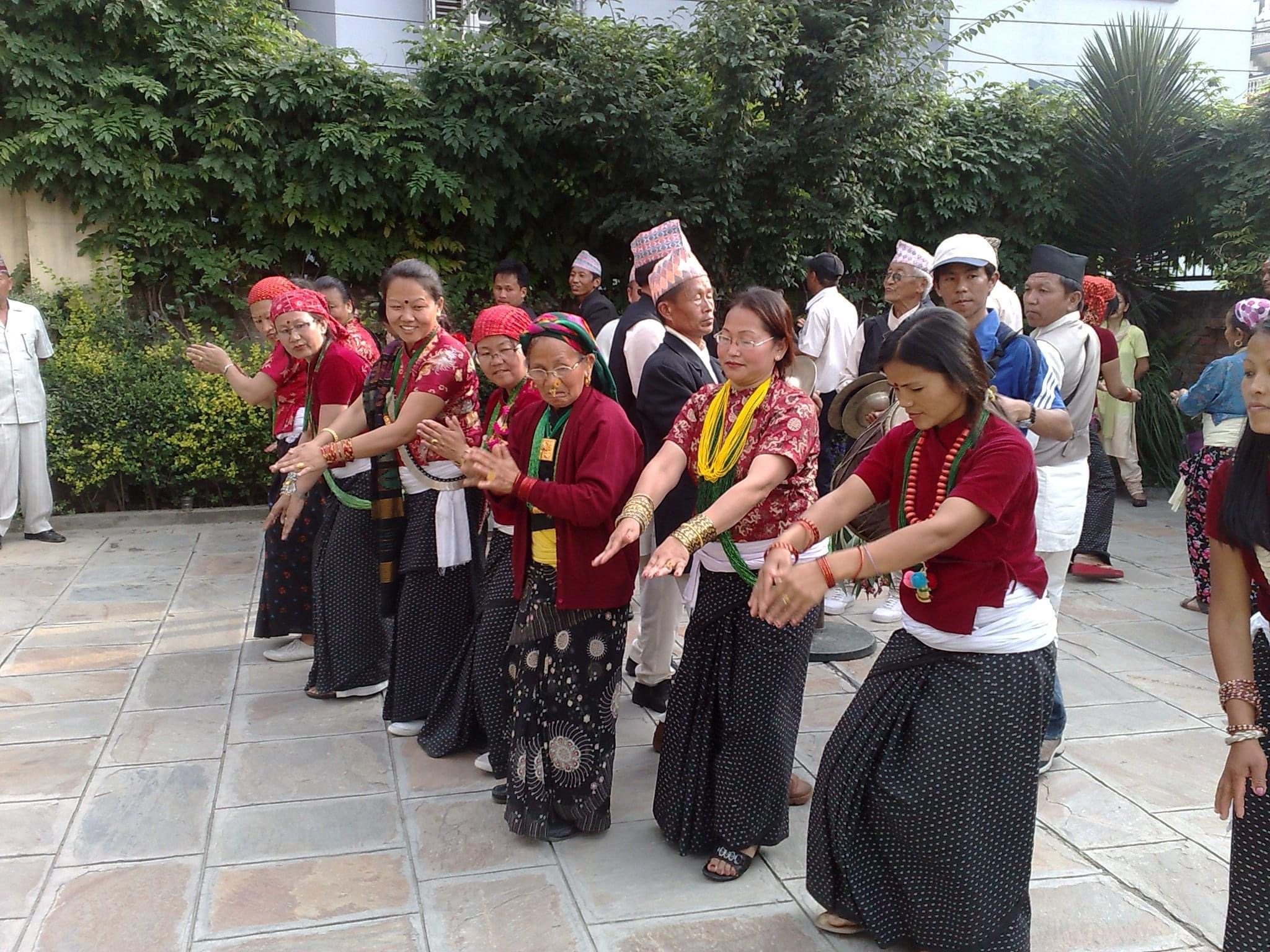
Toshi silli dance
- "Silli Dance": Silli dances are performed during Udhauli, Ubhauli Sakela Festival Silli dances are different styles and types among the various Rai sub-group. in silli dances the major instruments used Jhyamta and Dhol some Rai group only used Jhyamta in their silli dances. Horasungchha, Kulung, Khaling, Thulung, Nachhiring Rai also used animal Horn (Pung Baja) in silli dances.
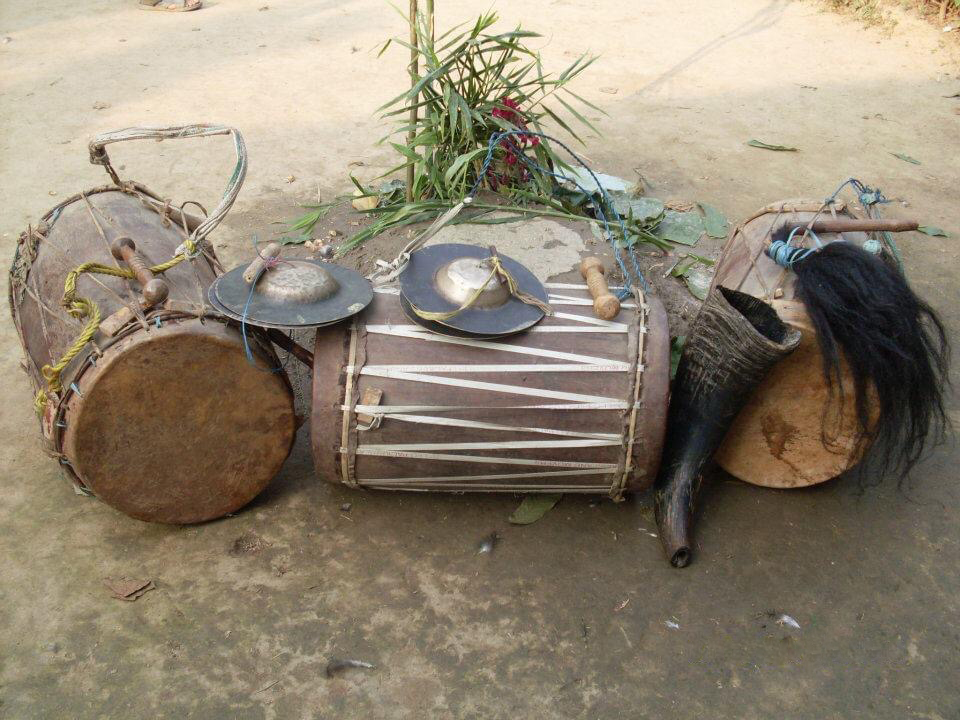
  Traditional Instruments of Silli Dance
  Silli are mostly perform their daily activities that are similar to the activities of the human beings similarly the imitate other activities like worshiping the tap and sun the sillis show how people began agriculture like digging tilling, weeding and farming cotton. like wise the imitation of the Birds and animals, depiction of hunting, war etc. can be seen in silli dance.
- "Wadangmi Papani", also knowan as Papani or wadangmet this dance perform during Wadangmi festival. Wadangmi is a great festival of Rai community in Khalsa region of Dhankuta District. The dancing style of wadangmi is steps forward, three steps later, with the help of shoulder, the body communicates and dances to the beat of Dhol and Jhyamta, singing songs of love, harmony and devotion. It is like a celebration of love. At this time, no one should scold or fight, if they scold or fight the ancestor deity Budhahang will unhappy. At this time, there is a popular belief that if a boy offers love to a girl or a girl offers love to a boy, he should not complain. "This festive dance beautifully embodies the issue of women's freedom and also shows that women do not have to endure any pressure at this time.
- "Chhonglak", also the part of Wadangmi Chhonglak is the language of the Rai of the Khalsa region of Dhankuta District. The word "Uchompakma" and "Lakwat" means to come from the soul to be happy, to forget all sorrows and get up. "Lak" means to dance happily. It is also said that it is time for the gods and goddesses to come to the Khalsa region. This is the initial stage of the Wadhangmi dance, which is celebrated throughout the Chhonglak festival to make happy the souls of the gods and goddesses.
- "Hopcha" is the traditional classical dance of Rai community and is mostly practiced in Dhankuta Region .
- "Hurla" is cultural dance of Yamphu Rai of Sankhuwasabha District it is perform in the month of Mangsir (November–December) Hurla dance is performed with singing song during rice harvesting season in paddy field. this dance also called Paddy dance(Dhan Nach).
- "Shamanistic Dance" performed by Bijuwa, Nakchhong, Nakcho, Bijuwa Mangpa Shamans of Rai Community in various Ritual activities.
- "Maruni Dance" is a Popular Nepali folk Dance there are different types of Maruni dances Rai Community also perform maruni dance in various occasions Adhiya Maruni, Madale Maruni are very popular Maruni dances in Rai Community.

=== Folk musical instruments ===
Some of the musical instruments found in Rai community are: Dhol, Jhyamta Binayo, Murchunga, Murali/Bansuri, Mandala (madal), Jhyali, Majira, Bimbilia, Sumbak), Khakuma, Pung, Sillimi, Yalamberbaja etc.

- Binayo Kongkongma/Dong

Kongkongma or Binayo is a traditional Kirati- Rai Instrument made from hidden Malingo species of bamboo. Binayo is made by digging in the middle of a small bamboo-about six-inch stream, removing the tongue, tying the thread on both sides and carving a beautiful pattern. Binayo made in this way is played by shaking the long rope of the bar in front of the tongue When playing in this way, Binayo is placed on both the lips of the mouth to make various vakas and the vibration caused by the push of air from inside is affected by the tongue.This instrument is carried by a Kirat Rai woman hanging on the tuna of her cholo.

- Dhol Bubuk Ken

The main rhythm instrument of the Kirat Rai is Dhol or (Bubuk ken). This instrument is mainly used in Sakewa (Sakela dance) in some places mangpa and Bijuwas are also used for worship while sitting in the place . It is also a popular instrument in Nepal.

- Jhyamta Munikomma/Maniken

Along with the Dhol, Jhyamta (Munikomma) is also played in Sakewa Sakela dance. In some places, Bijuwa and Mangpas are also used for worship while sitting in the place.

- Yalamber Baja Yala Ken

Among the various bamboo instruments, the Yalambar is one of the most important and original instrument of the Kirat Rai . By keeping the eyes on both the sides of the bamboo, the choya of the same bamboo is taken out and a four-cornered hole is made in the middle of the bamboo choita chaper. This instrument is also an indicator of musical civilization.

- Murchunga Kakkong

Murchunga Or Kakkong made of iron is the original traditional instrument of Kirat Rai. It is customary for Kirat Rai youths to give this instrument as a gift to their favorite friends.

- Leaf (instrument) Sumbak Ken

Sumbak or leaf instrument is a musical instrument that is played by holding the side of a smooth leaf between two lips and taking out various vakas. This instrument is especially popular in Kirati community of Eastern Nepal, Sikkim, Darjeeling region.

- Chari Baja Pan flute Khakuma

Khakuma or Charibaja is an instrument made of bamboo. this instrument is called Charibaja or (Khakuma) because it sounds like a bird when it is blown of the mouth.

- Animal-horn instrument Pung Ken

Pung is an instrument played by blowing the horn of Animal Wild buffalo with a hole in the top and placing a Malingo pipe in that small hole. This baja is played along with Dhol-zyamta with Nokcho (Shaman Priest) when going to worship at Tosh or Toshi, Wass (Sakela) Than. This instrument is a traditional instrument prevalent in the Khambu Rai community. This instrument is used with special importance by the Kulung, Khaling, Thulung, Nachhering of the Rai community. Its sound is similar to that of a conch shell.

- Murali Bibilimma

Murali (Bibilimma) Flute is made of small bamboo of Malingo species. Nigalo Malingo bamboo is very good for to make Murali flute . It is cut horizontally on one side and a thin bamboo choya or bhakkimila wood is placed there and a hole is made. On the other side, 6–7 hole are placed. To play it, you put the side of the flute in your mouth and blow it slowly, then the sound starts flowing from there. In order to convert this flowing sound into music, the holes covered by the fingers are covered and opened in order. When playing the flute in this way, a very melodious voice flows. It is the most beloved instrument of Kirat Rai.

- Jharky Thal Chambyken

Chambyken (Jharky Thal) Bronze Plate are especially played by Mangpa, Bijuwa, Nakchhongs when they Chanting Mundum mantras.

- Jor Murali

Jor Murali (Two in One Flute) is endangered folk instrument of Kirat Rai. Jor Murali is played by tying two strings made of bamboo sticks with the same sound. Kirat Rai style of Jor Murali Baja is left to make in the present days. this Instrument have already become extinct.

- Dhyangro Sangra Ken'

Dhyangro or (Sangra Ken) is mostly used by Khambu Rai Shamans; Mangpa, Bijuwa, well as their allies Kencharawa.

- Sillimi

This silimi is made by placing 12 rings side by side in a flat elongated shape made of iron and placing four rings under the lower grip. The silimi baja is played by holding the sili dance in one's hand and shaking it with the dance moves. This is the traditional instrument of the Rai Community

- Madal Rantang

Madal is one of the most popular instruments in Nepali music today. This Madal wooden stone is made of Animal leather, coal, rice husk and other materials. It is believed that Madal was made after the Yalambar Baja of the Kiratis. Madal has a special cultural significance in Wambule Rai community.

- Basuri

Basuri is also a major folk Instrument among Kirat Rai. Basuri has a Special Cultural significance important of Wambule Rai community.

- Suseli Suisuila

The Kirat Rai used Susulila/Suseli as sweet music. Whistling can be done only with the mouth without the help of any object, while using the fingers of the hand in the mouth is also used to transmit signals far and wide.

- Kangling Bhalangkat

Kangling is mostly used by Rai (Shamans) Mangpa, Bijuwa, Nakchong during ritual activities

== Occupations ==
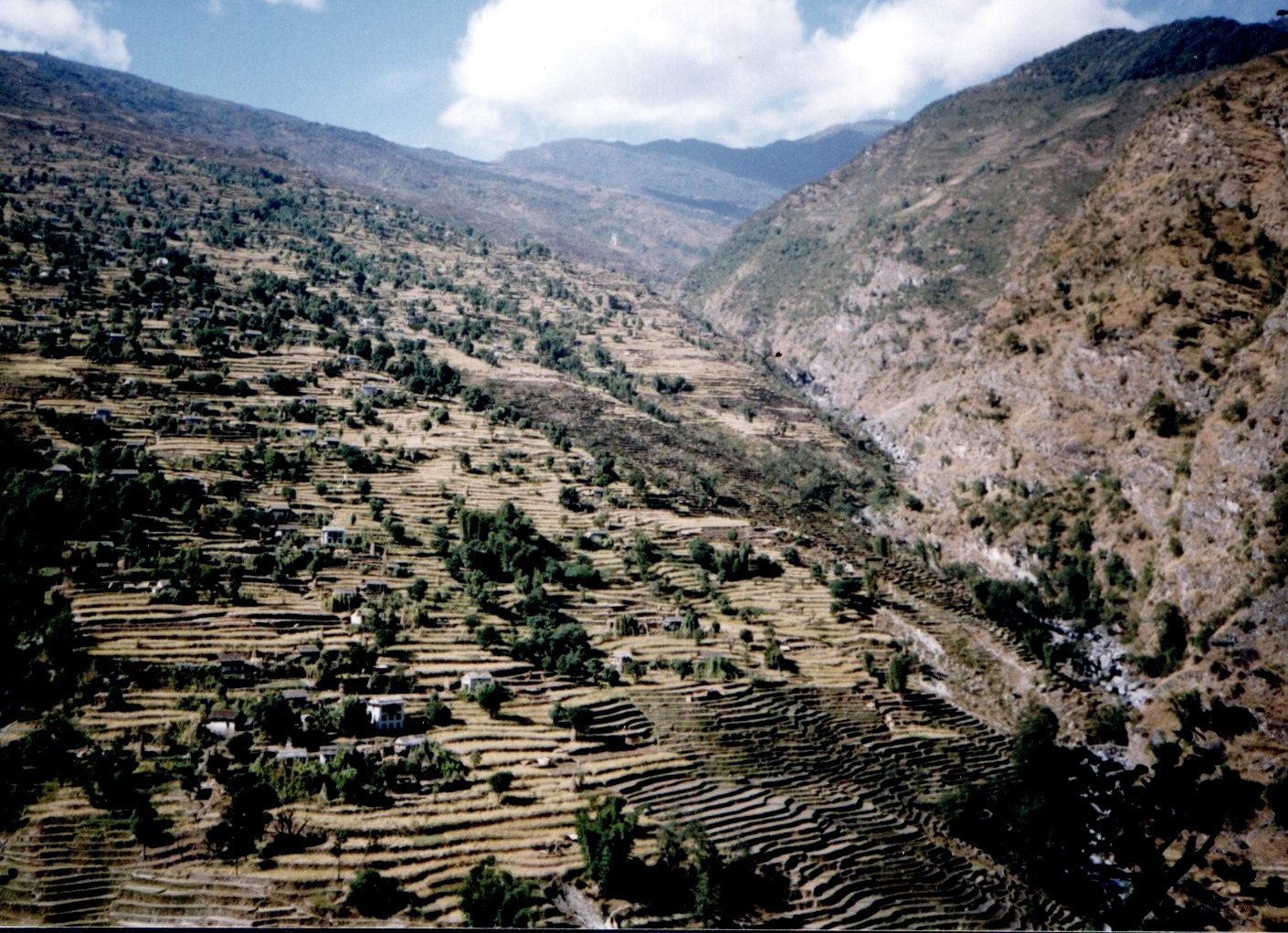
Terrace farming Hillsides around Bung Hongu Valley Lower Solukhambu dominant inhabited region of Rai People of Kulung sub group

Farming is the main occupation of the majority of Rai people. Mostly they cultivate maize, millet, wheat, mustard in dry terraces, and rice in the wet fields. The grains grown are mostly for their own daily needs such as to use in festivals and to feed the animals. Besides that they use it to make spirits and beer for consumption and some sell at the bazar at the local market. In almost all households women Raise buffalo, pigs and chickens, and they run tiny provision stores for supplementary income, especially used to sell homemade beer and alcohol (Lee, 2005:16).

In the past Rai people were into hunting and they liked to use bow and arrows, and they used to weave their own clothes made from Bhangra (allo) to wear.

Traditionally daily housework, such as cooking is the responsibility of the young women, especially girls,. They tend to be the ones who gather firewood from the forests and carry water from the communal water sources while men are mostly involved in the agriculture activities.

In the past Kirati Rai people used to use the land under the Kipat system where the people exercised communal rights over the land; land that was tax free and included dominion over all cultivated lands, forests, streams and rivers within its bounds (Bista, 1967:38). Under the Kipat system other ethnic groups had to pay tax to the Rai owners of the land. People used to farm their land on their own, seldom were fields rented or cultivated by anyone others than the owners.

The planting and harvesting seasons from spring to autumn gives them plenty of work to do and in winter time villagers make trips towards the important towns to buy necessary goods such as salt, oil and materials for clothing. They carry goods for trade rather than money on these trips. One farmer may have several fields and they shift from one to another according to the seasons. Traditional Bullocks are used for ploughing the land, the grass and dry undergrowth are burned away, supplying the soil with ash residue (ibid: 38). A majority of the people are in debt, the usual practice for money transaction to be made against security in the land.

== Notable Rai people ==
- Agansing Rai, recipient of 13th Victoria Cross
- Amar Singh Rai Indian Politician from Darjeeling
- Ashok Rai, Former Vice Chairperson of Communist Party of Nepal and Senior leader of Socialist Party
- Asit Rai, writer and novelist Sahitya Akademi winner
- Bal Bahadur Rai, senior cabinet minister, acted as Prime Minister; senior leader of Nepali Congress Party
- Bhupal Rai poet, writer and Chancellor of Nepal Academy
- Bartika Eam Rai Nepali Singer/Song Writer
- Chandra Das Rai, Indian politician, senior leader in Sikkim State Congress, bureaucrat and former journalist.
- Dayahang Rai, actor, director, play writer and founder of 'Mandala Theatre'
- Deo Prakash Rai General secretary of the All India Gorkha League and named as Minister in the West Bengal state government.
- Dhiraj Rai, Nepalese Singer
- Dil Maya Rai, National Assembly of Bhutan
- Garja Man Rai, Bhutanese Politician
- Gopal Kirati, Nepalese Politician
- Haiman Das Rai Writer in Indian Nepali Literature Sahitya Akademi winner
- Hari Prasad Gorkha Rai writer
- Harka Raj Rai(Harka Sampang) Mayor of Dharan
- Indra Bahadur Rai, writer and literary critic
- Jai Bir Rai, Minister of Education Bhutan
- Kiban Rai Professional Welsh footballer
- Jitu Rai Indian shooter Padma Shri and Khel Ratna Award winner
- Lain Singh Bangdel, former Chancellor of the Royal Nepal Academy
- Lalit Rai, Indian Kargil War
- Man Bahadur Rai Indian Army Officer
- Manbir Rai, Defence Minister Government of Nepal
- Meenakshi Madan Rai 48th Chief Justice of Patna High Court
- Melina Rai, Nepalese singer
- Milan Chams, Nepalese Director
- Mira Rai, athlete and trail runner
- Narad Muni Thulung, senior cabinet acted as Prime Minister of Nepal
- Pawan Kumar Chamling, Longest serving Chief Minister of India (24 years, 165 days), founder of the Sikkim Democratic Front party
- Pradeep Kumar Rai, lyricist of current Nepalese National Anthem, Sayaun Thunga Phulka
- Prem Das Rai, Indian politician from Sikkim
- Rajan Mukarung, writer and activist
- Rajendra Kumar Rai 3rd Chief Minister of Province No. 1 Nepal
- Rajendra Kumar Rai, cabinet minister Ministry of Land Management, Cooperatives and Poverty Alleviation Nepal
- Rajesh Payal Rai, singer and music composer
- Ram Prasad Rai, revolutionary fighter against Rana autocracy
- Ratna Bahadur Rai, Indian Politician From Darjeeling
- Sabin Rai, pop singer from Dharan
- Santa Bahadur Rai, Secretary & Chairman Public Service Commission
- Sarita Rai, Indian Politician from West Bengal
- Shiva Kumar Rai, Nepali writer and the first Gorkha minister in the state of West Bengal
- Shrawan Mukarung, poet
- Sudan Kirati, cabinet minister Ministry of Culture, Tourism and Civil Aviation Nepal
- Suk Bahadur Rai, awarded Aung San Thuriya in 1950 A.D.
- Tanka Bahadur Rai, Indian Politician from Assam belong to Indian National Congress
- Tarundeep Rai, Indian Olympiad archer Padma Shri and Arjuna Award winner
- Tek Bahadur Rai, politician from Bhutan, Member of the National Assembly of Bhutan
- Tulshi Devi Rai, Former minister of Water Security, Public Health Engineering, Social Justice, Empowerment & Welfare Departments of Sikkim
- Wilson Bikram Rai, comedian, actor, singer, dancer, film producer

== See also ==
- Ethnic groups in Bhutan
- Ethnic groups in Nepal
- Kiranti languages (Rai Languages)
- Sikkimese people
- South Asian ethnic groups
- Kirati people
