= Nakchhong =

Nakchhong (नाक्छोङ) are the Shamanic tribal priest of Khambu Rai people an ethnic group that is predominantly located in the Himalayas of Nepal, Sikkim, Darjeeling and Kalimpong.

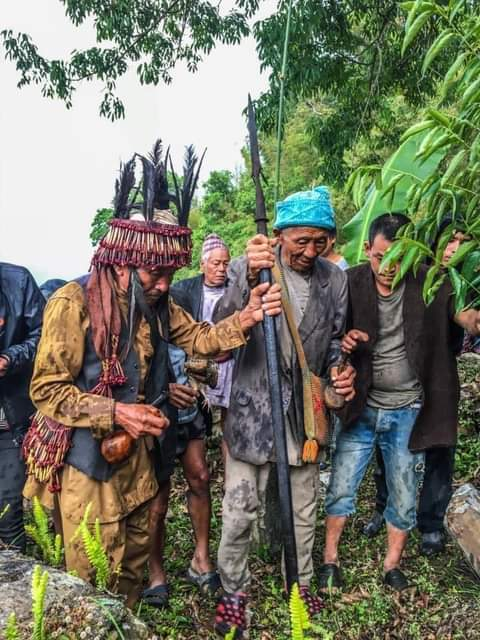
A Nakchhong performing the Sakela ritual at Sakela altar.

Nakchhong is the main priest of the Sakela shrine; during Udhauli and Ubhauli. They are self-learned, self-realized and do not have a teacher. During the unavailability of Nakchhongs, others can be chosen to perform the ritual worship at the Sakela altar. It seems that before worshiping Sakela (Bhumidev), four types of Mang (deities) are being worshiped by Nakchhong in a regular manner. Only after worshiping the said Mang (deities) according to the law, it is believed that the Sakela Nakchhong will get the power to worship Suptulung (three stone altar), Sikari devta (hunter deity), Nagangeni (snake deities), Simebhume, and Retkamang (eight ancestral spirits), who are also worshiped asking for power. After all the work is done, Sakela Nakchhong will give the sound of drums from his house and inform about the beginning of Sakela. Before going to Sakela worship, Nakchhong first worships”Suptulung” (three stone altar of the house) and asks for strength.

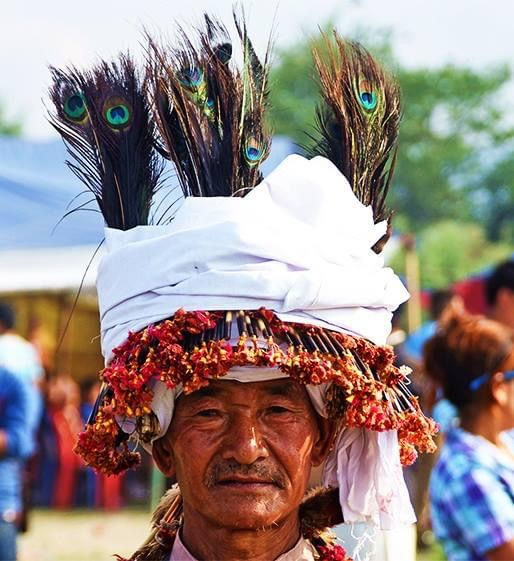
Nakchhong with Peacock feathers in his head

Nakchhongs in the Khambu Rai community are bridges connecting the living with ancestors and spirits. He adorns himself with porcupine quills and peacock feathers. It is believed that knowledge is passed to a ‘nakchong’ in his dreams. When he wakes up, he has all the skills and powers of a shaman.

- Nakchhong frequently work with the following materials:
- अदुवा (Kirat culture) ginger
- Pokhemma
- Tupla (cut pieces of the front part of a banana leaf)
- Chindo: Gourd filled with Jand (millet beer)
