= Udhauli =

Kirat harvest festival from Nepal and India

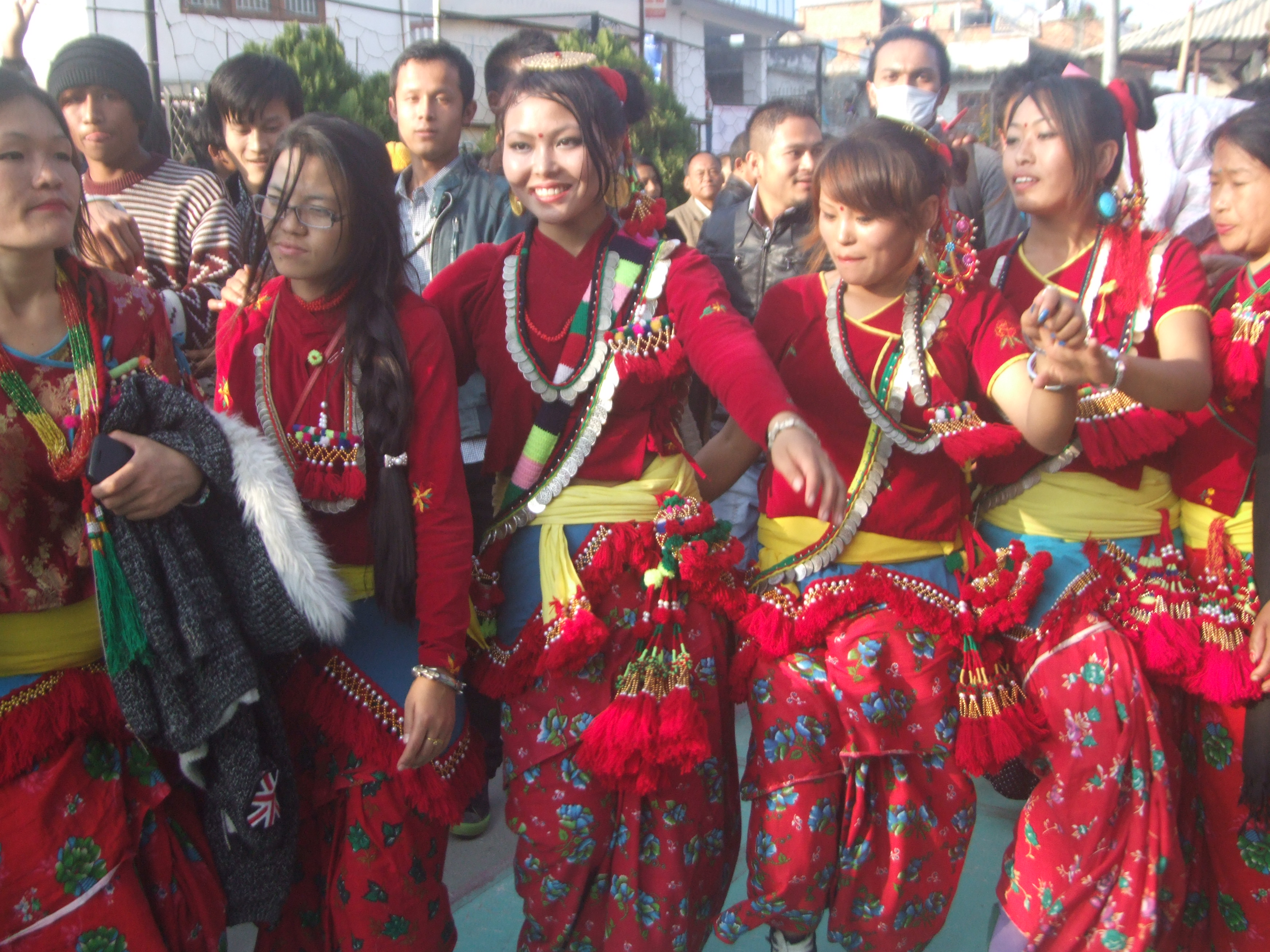
- Udhauli celebration by Kirat Sunuwar people
- Observed by: Kirat communities
- Type: Kirat festival
- Significance: worship nature for a good harvest
- Observances: Prayers and religious rituals
- Date: purnima (Full Moon Day) of Mangshir
- Frequency: Annual
- Related to: Yomari Punhi of Newar, Chasok Tangnam of Limbu, Kul Puja of Khas

Udhauli (Nepali: उधौली, lit. 'going down') is a festival of the Kirat communities of Kirati people specially celebrated by Sunuwar, Limbu, Yakkha, Khambu Rai etc. of Nepal, and elsewhere in the world where the Kirati indigenous people reside. It is celebrated every year, marking the migration phase downwards towards the low-elevation regions when the winter season arrives. The migration from the low-elevation areas to hilly areas is called Ubhauli (upwards), which is also an annual festival of these communities On the Udhauli festival day, the Kirat people offer thanks to mother nature for providing a good harvest.

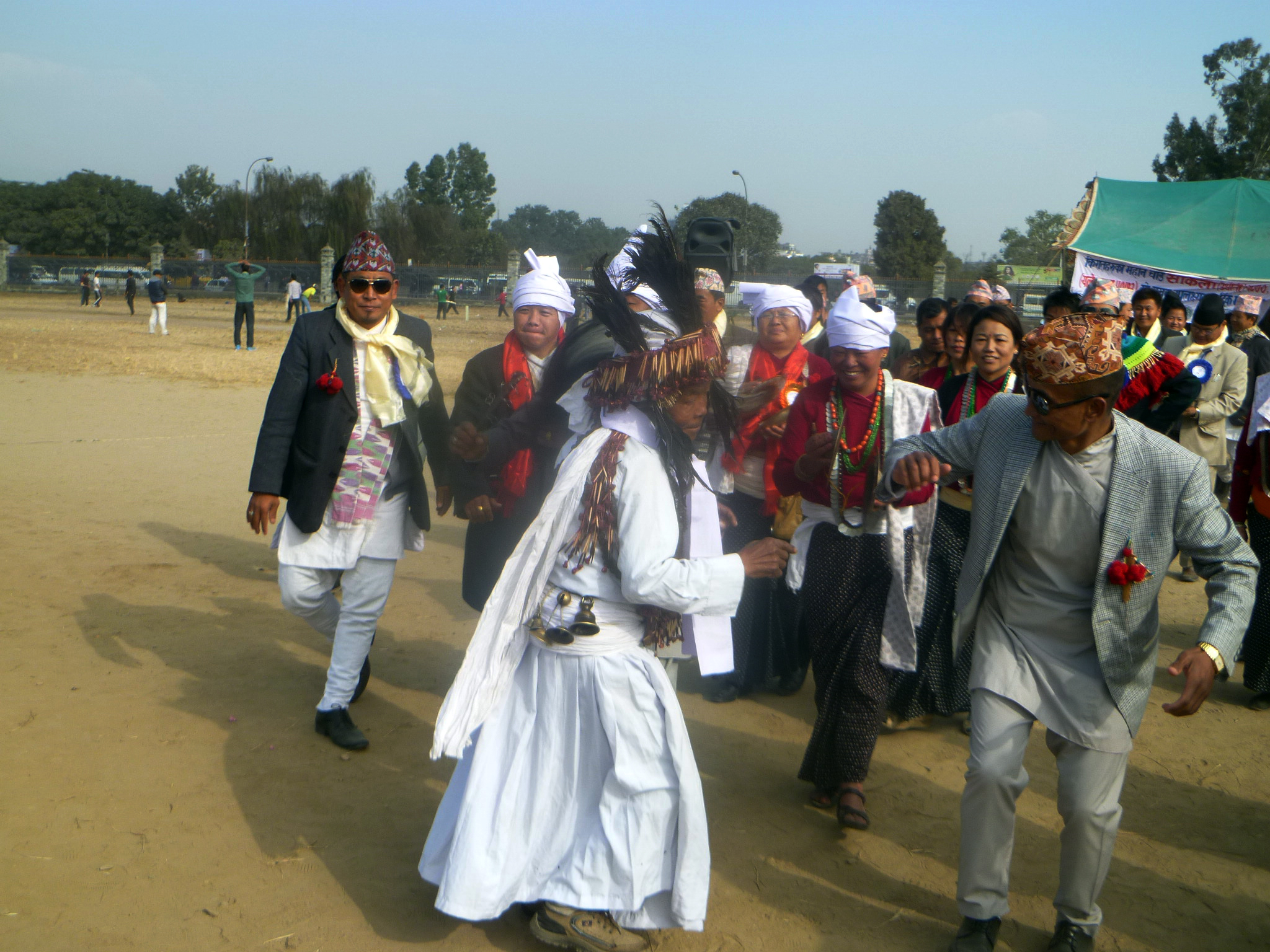
Udhauli celebration by Kirat people

Udhauli festival is celebrated by all Kirat people. It is believed that from this day the winter season starts. So people, birds, and animals migrate from cold regions to warmer regions. It's mainly celebrated in the eastern region of Nepal by dancing an exotic dance called Sakewa or commonly known as ''Sakela''. The dance is very popular in Nepal and is performed by dancing harmoniously in a circle with the beat of Dhol/drum, Jhyamta/cymbals etc. Sakela's dance steps were passed down from ancestor that had been copied from the life style of animals and their behaviors.

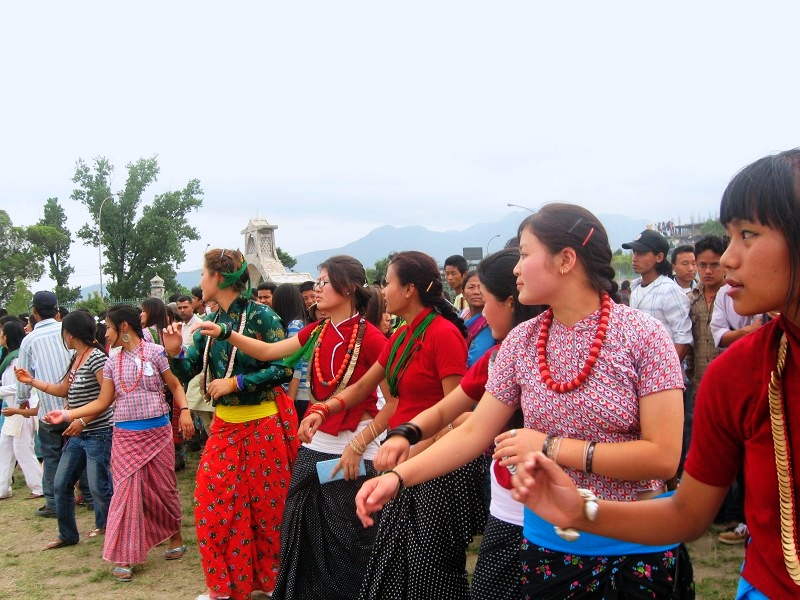
Kirant Khambu Rai celebrating the festival Sakela

During the dance each tribe of kirat communities perform their own dance steps according to their sub clans. As sakela is a dance for respecting the mother earth, it is believed to please nature as appreciating nature's gift to human. So, in each steps of Sakela the dancer shows how civilization began and how kirati people learned to live in harmony with animals and birds.

The main destinations for the Sakela are Khotang, Bhojpur, Dharan, Dhankuta, Pathari, Kanepokhari, Kerabari etc. This event of the Kirat people has also been stated in the Mundhum (holy book of the Kirat people).

== See also ==
- Sakela
- Chasok Tangnam
- Ubhauli
