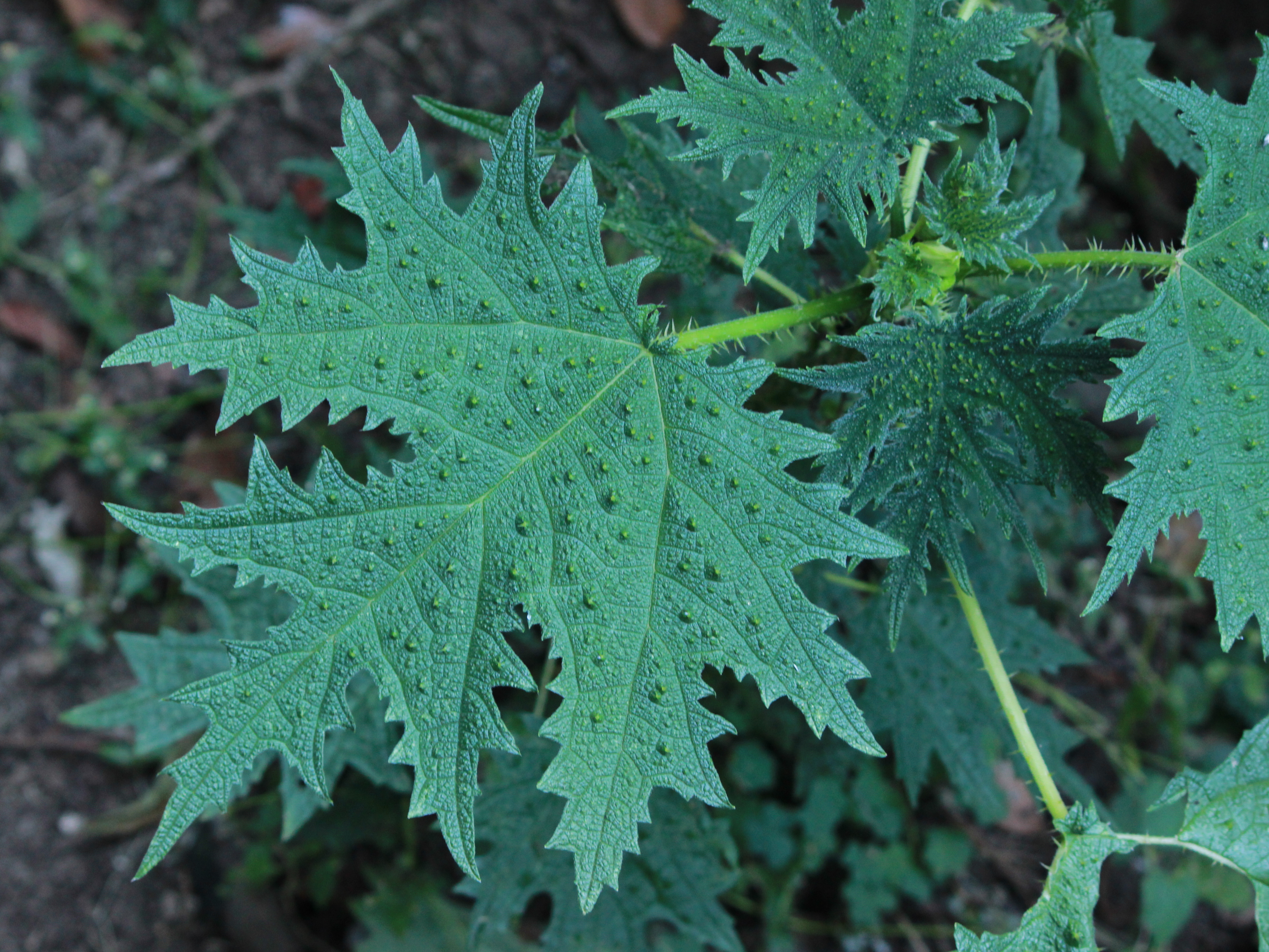

Scientific classification
- Kingdom: Plantae
- Clade: Tracheophytes
- Clade: Angiosperms
- Clade: Eudicots
- Clade: Rosids
- Order: Rosales
- Family: Urticaceae
- Genus: Girardinia
- Species: G. diversifolia

Binomial name
- Girardinia diversifolia (Link) Friis

Synonyms
- Girardinia adoensis (Steud.) Wedd.; Girardinia armata Kunth nom. illeg.; Girardinia chingianae S.S.Chien; Girardinia condensata (Hochst. ex Steud.) Wedd.; Girardinia erosa Decne.; Girardinia formosana Hayata ex Yamam.; Girardinia furialis Blume; Girardinia heterophylla (Vahl) Decne.; Girardinia hibiscifolia Miq.; Girardinia javanica Wedd.; Girardinia leschenaultiana Decne.; Girardinia longispica Hand.-Mazz.; Girardinia palmata Blume nom. illeg.; Girardinia vahlii Blume nom. illeg.; Girardinia vitifolia Franch. nom. illeg.; Girardinia vitifolia Wedd.; Girardinia zeylanica Decne.; Urtica adoensis Hochst.; Urtica adoensis Hochst. ex Steud.; Urtica buraei H. Lév.; Urtica condensata Hochst. ex Steud.; Urtica diversifolia Link; Urtica heterophylla Vahl; Urtica lobatifolia S.S. Ying; Urtica palmata Forssk.

= Girardinia diversifolia =

Species of plant

Girardinia diversifolia, commonly known as the Himalayan nettle or Nilghiri nettle, is a plant species with a wide native range across southern and eastern Asia (Pakistan, India, Nepal, Sri Lanka, Bangladesh, Myanmar, most of China, Korea, the extreme southeast of Russia, Thailand, Indonesia, and Vietnam) and across most of tropical Africa and Madagascar. It grows naturally at elevations between 100 and 2,800 metres (330 and 9,190 feet).

== Description ==
It is a shade tolerant, tall, stout and erect herb growing to 1.5 to 3 metres height with perennial rootstock. The plant grows as a clump, and each clump has many stems. The stem contains bast fibre of unique quality which is strong, smooth and light.

Like many other nettles in the family Urticaceae, the leaves have stinging hairs; in this species, they are potent, and can give an extremely painful rash and swelling which can last for a week or more.

It most frequently occurs in the hilly and mountainous regions at altitudes up to 3000 m.

Three subspecies are accepted:

- Girardinia diversifolia subsp. diversifolia
- Girardinia diversifolia subsp. suborbiculata (C.J.Chen) C.J.Chen & Friis
- Girardinia diversifolia subsp. triloba (C.J.Chen) C.J.Chen & Friis

== Uses ==
Traditional users of Allo are ethnic groups from across Nepal, including the Kulung, Gurung, Magar, Rai and Tamang people. Allo products are culturally important to both the Gurung and the Rai. It is also sold for commercial and non-religious purposes. Non-fibre uses of the plant range from fodder and fuel wood, to use as a live fence and in traditional medicines. Allo fibre is very flexible and has high tenacity, allowing it to be used in a multitude of applications ranging from clothing and bags to floor mats and rope. Fibres made from allo are fully biodegradable.

== Gallery ==
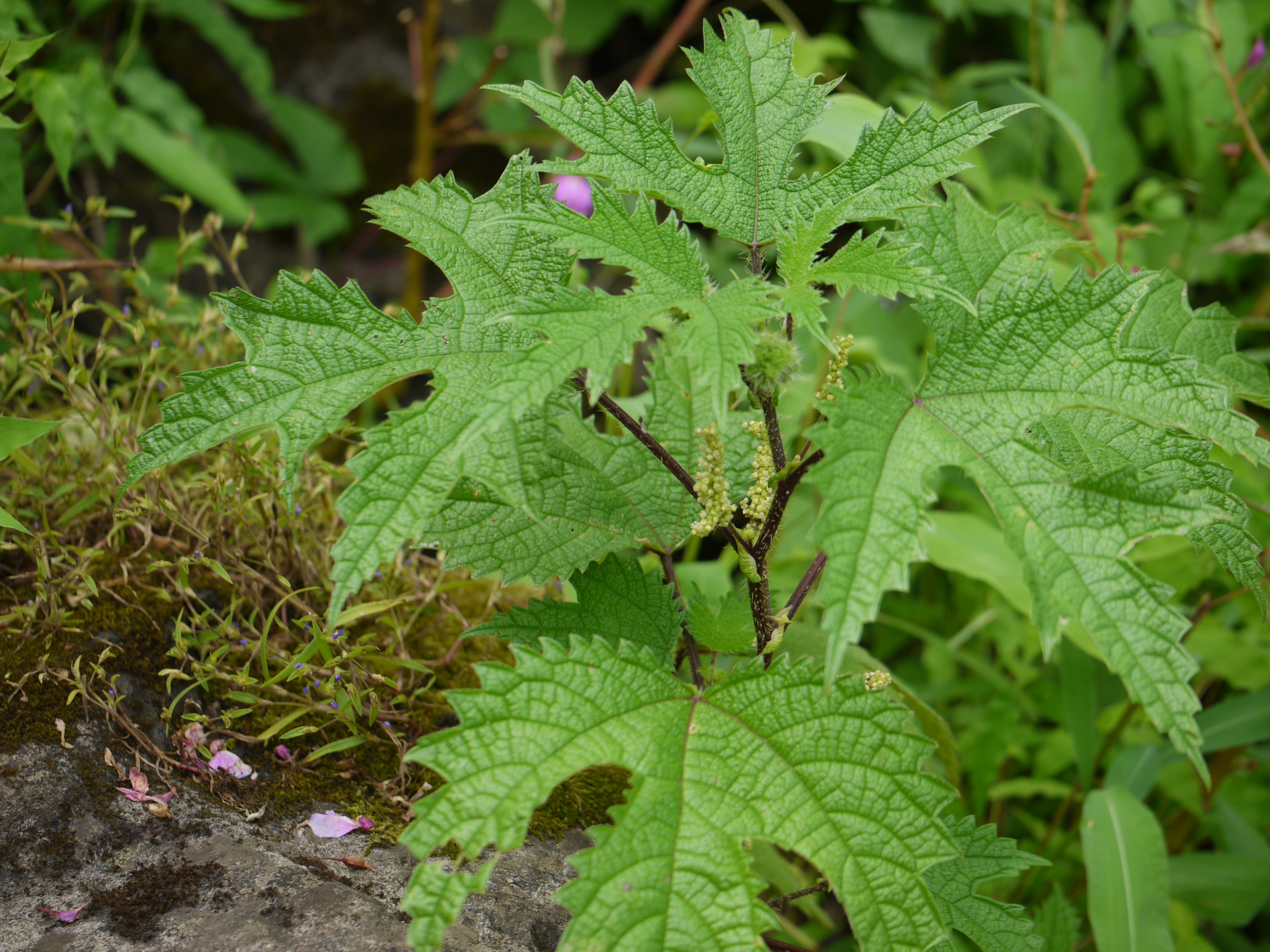

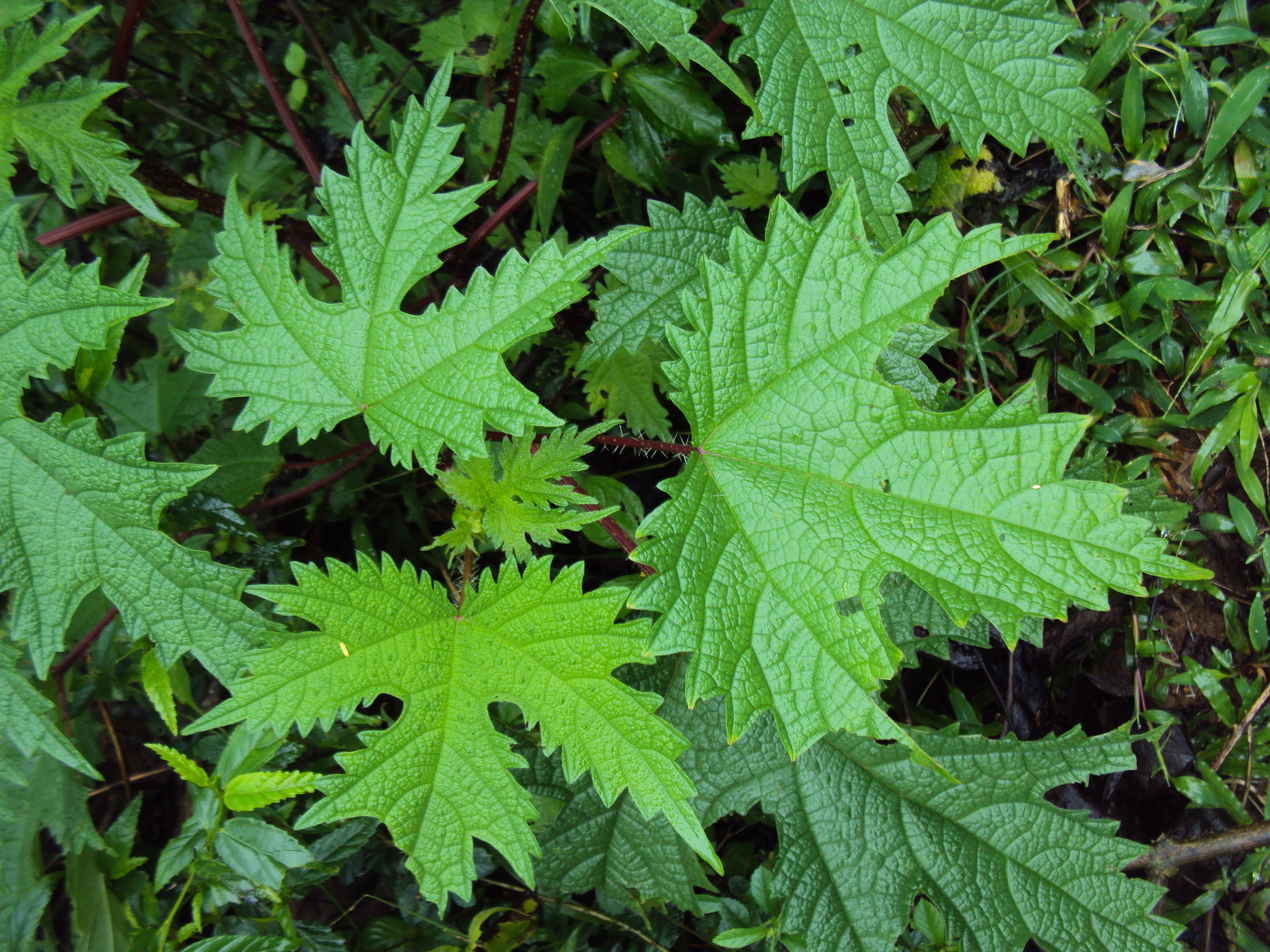

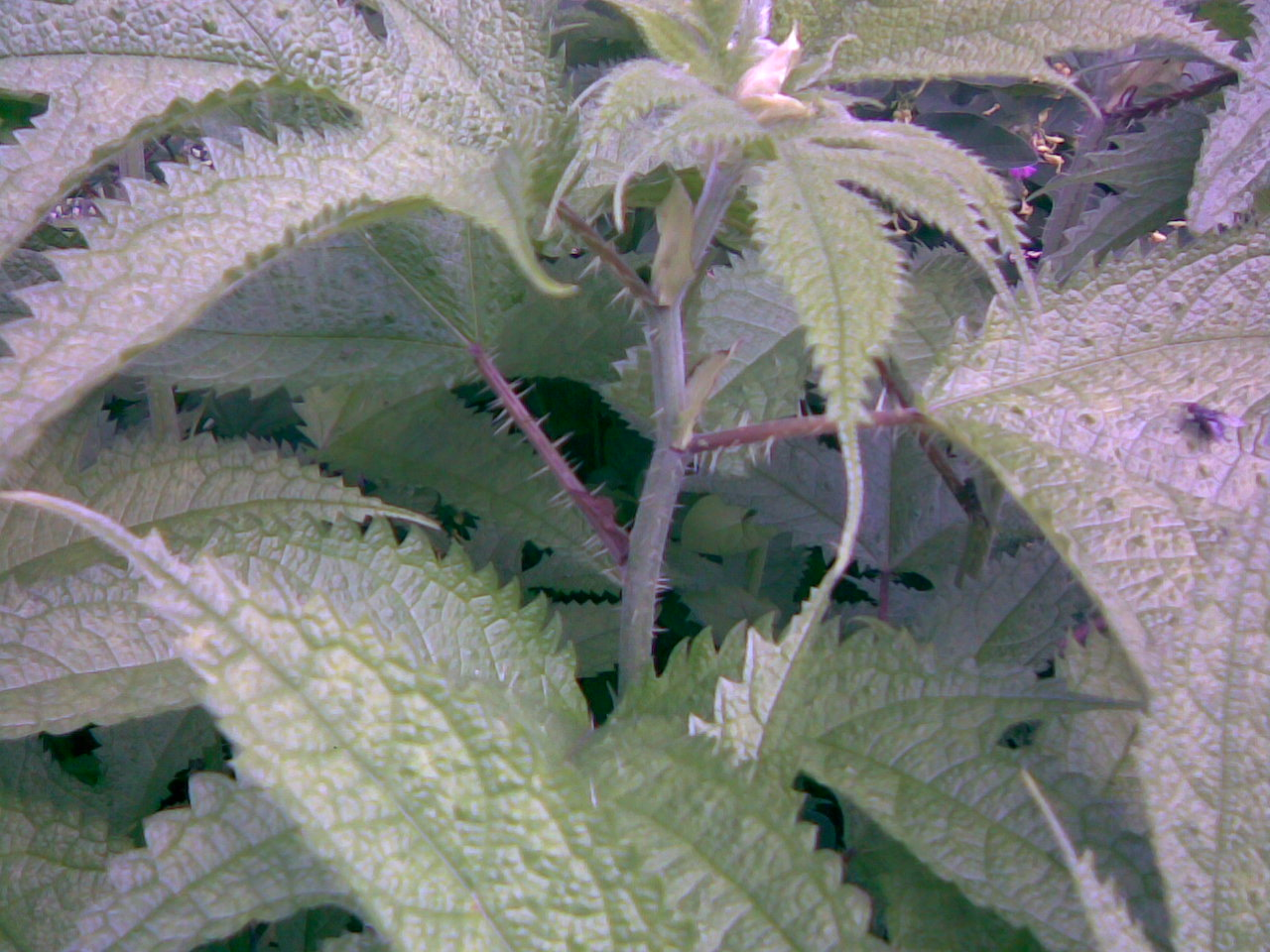

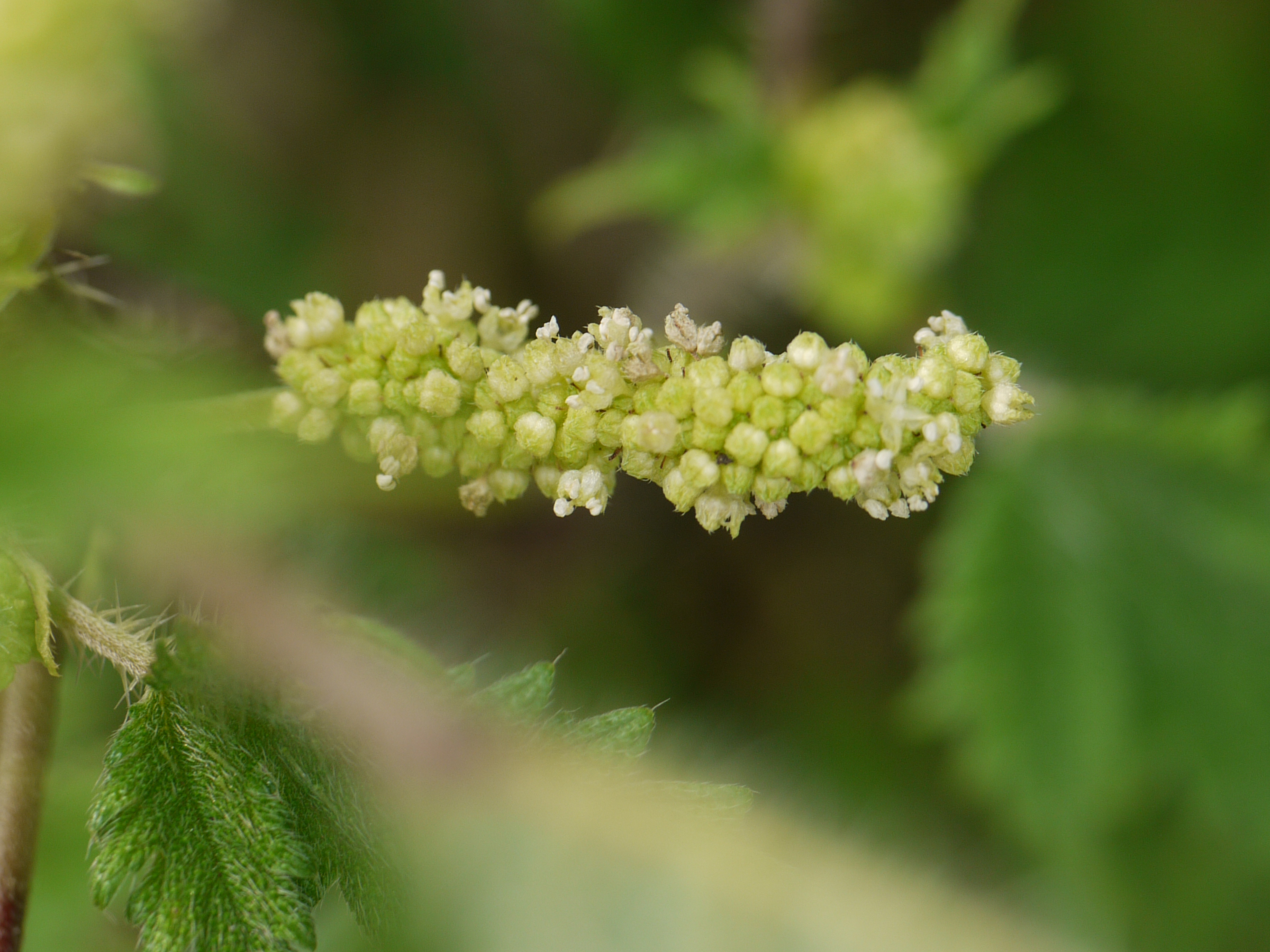
Inflorescence

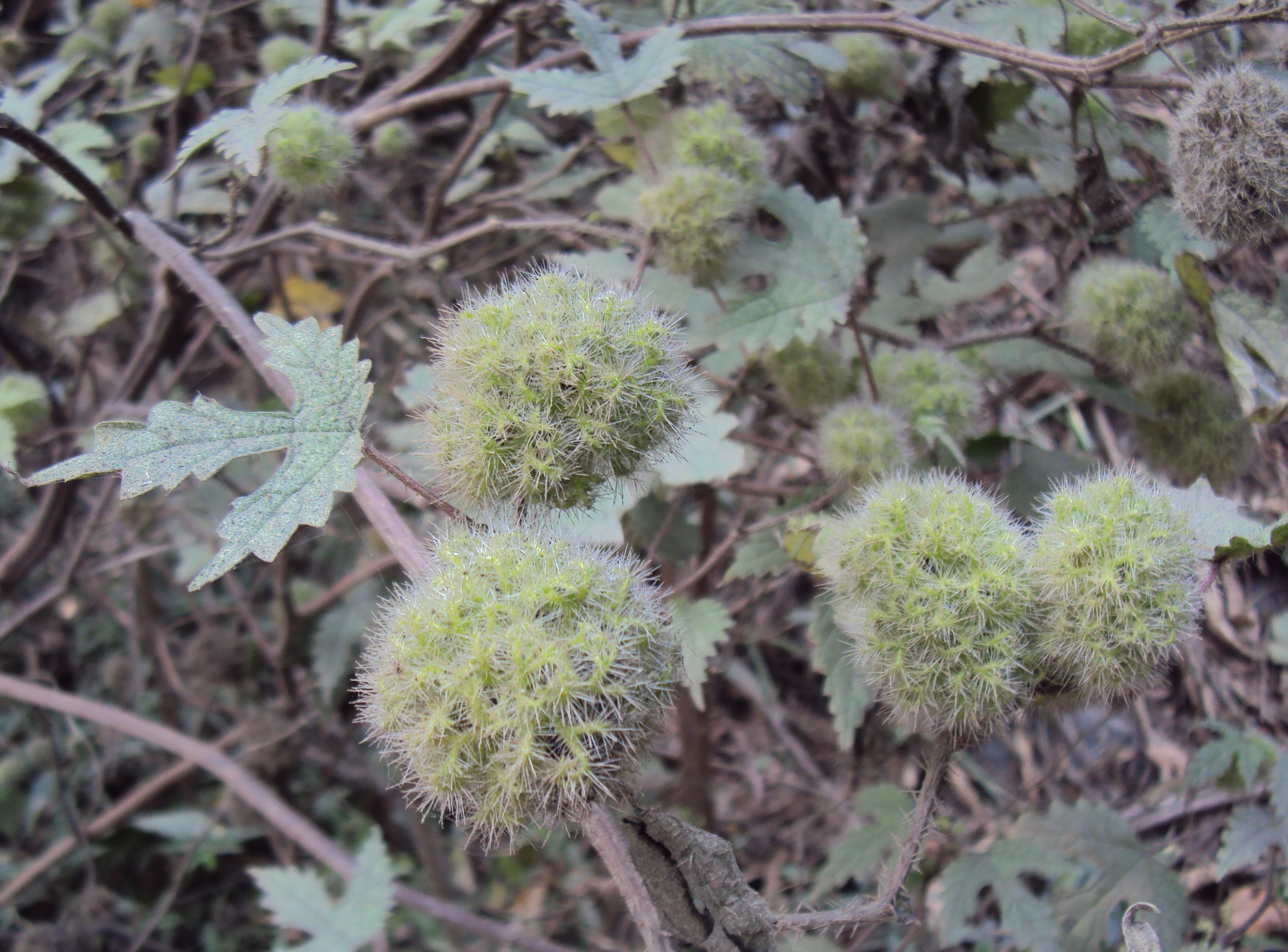
Fruit

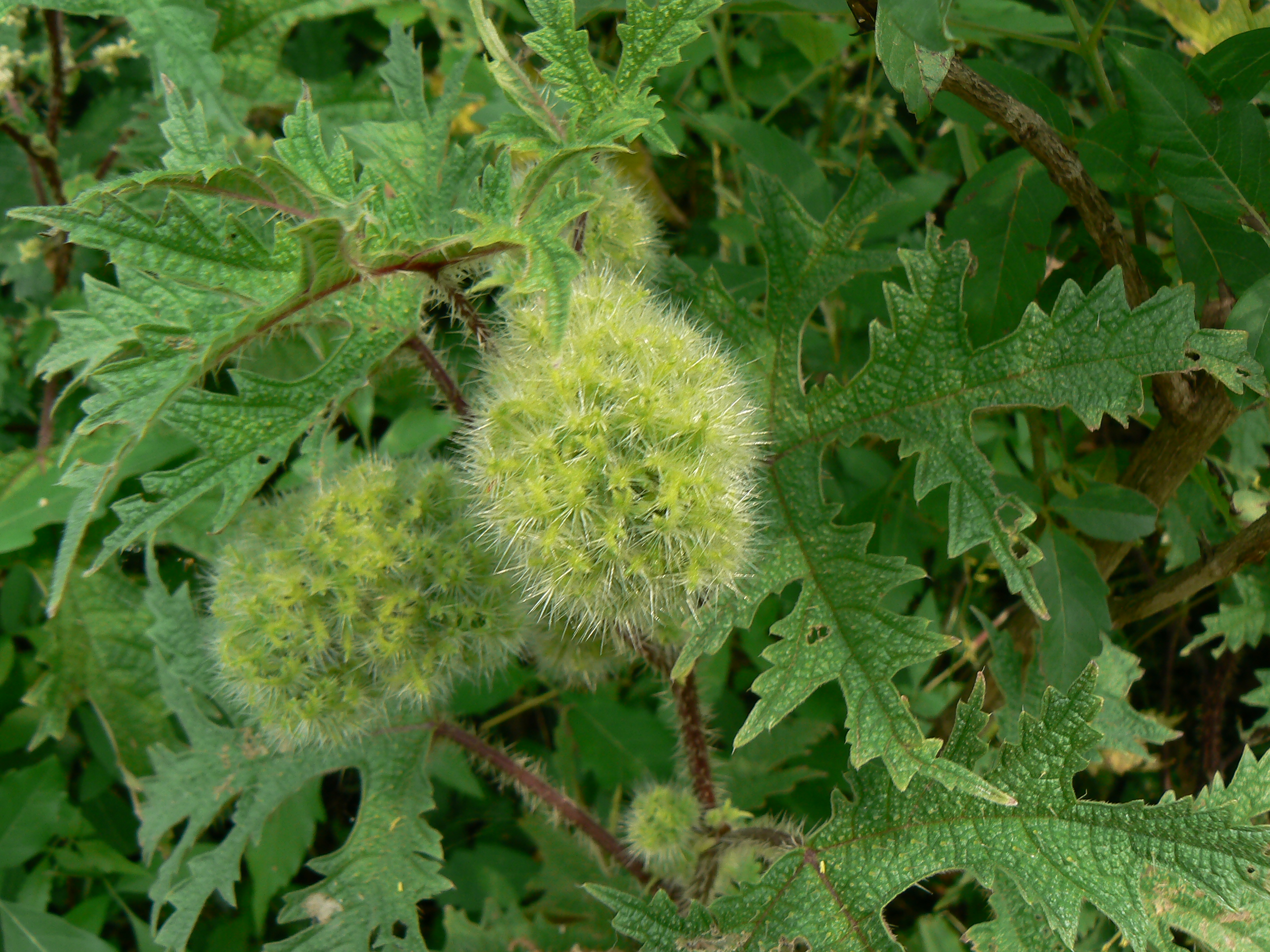

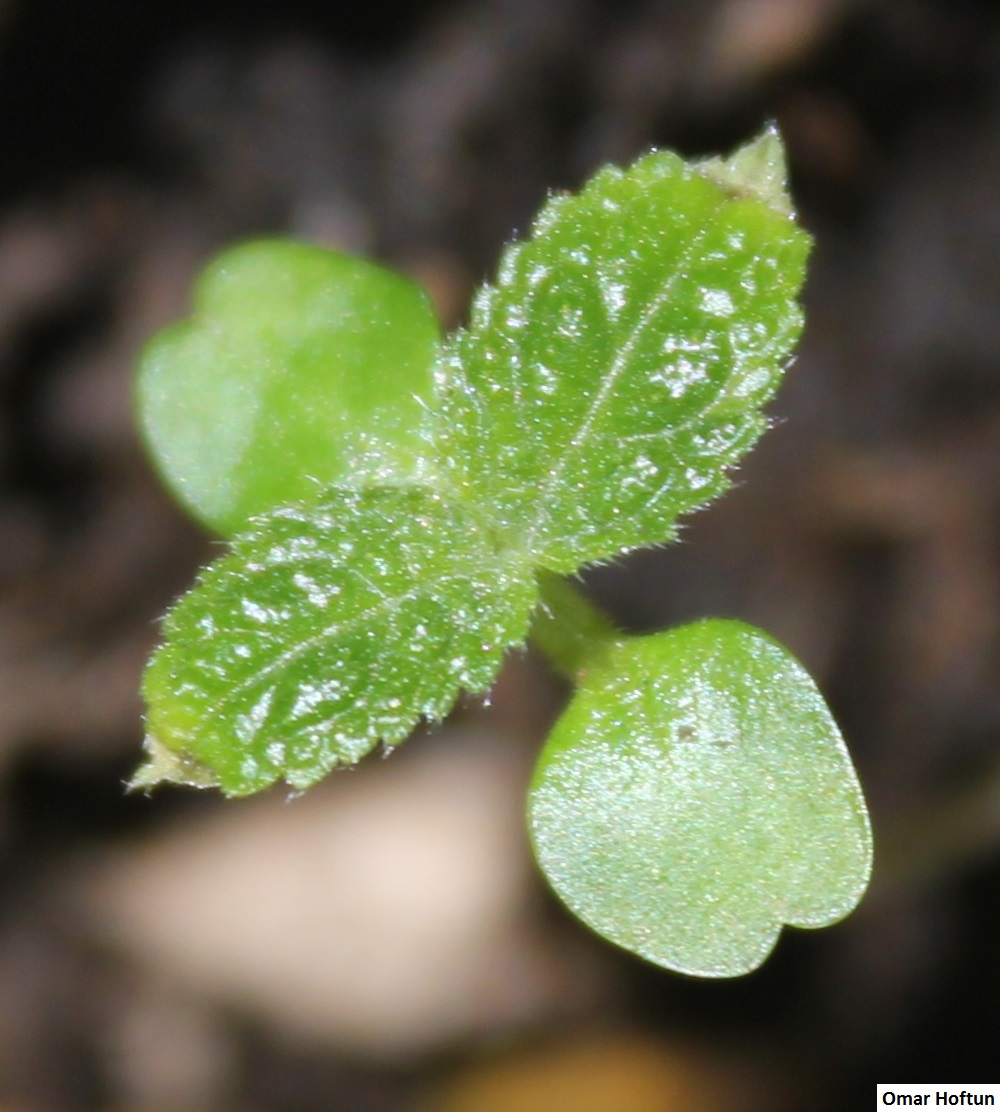
Seedling

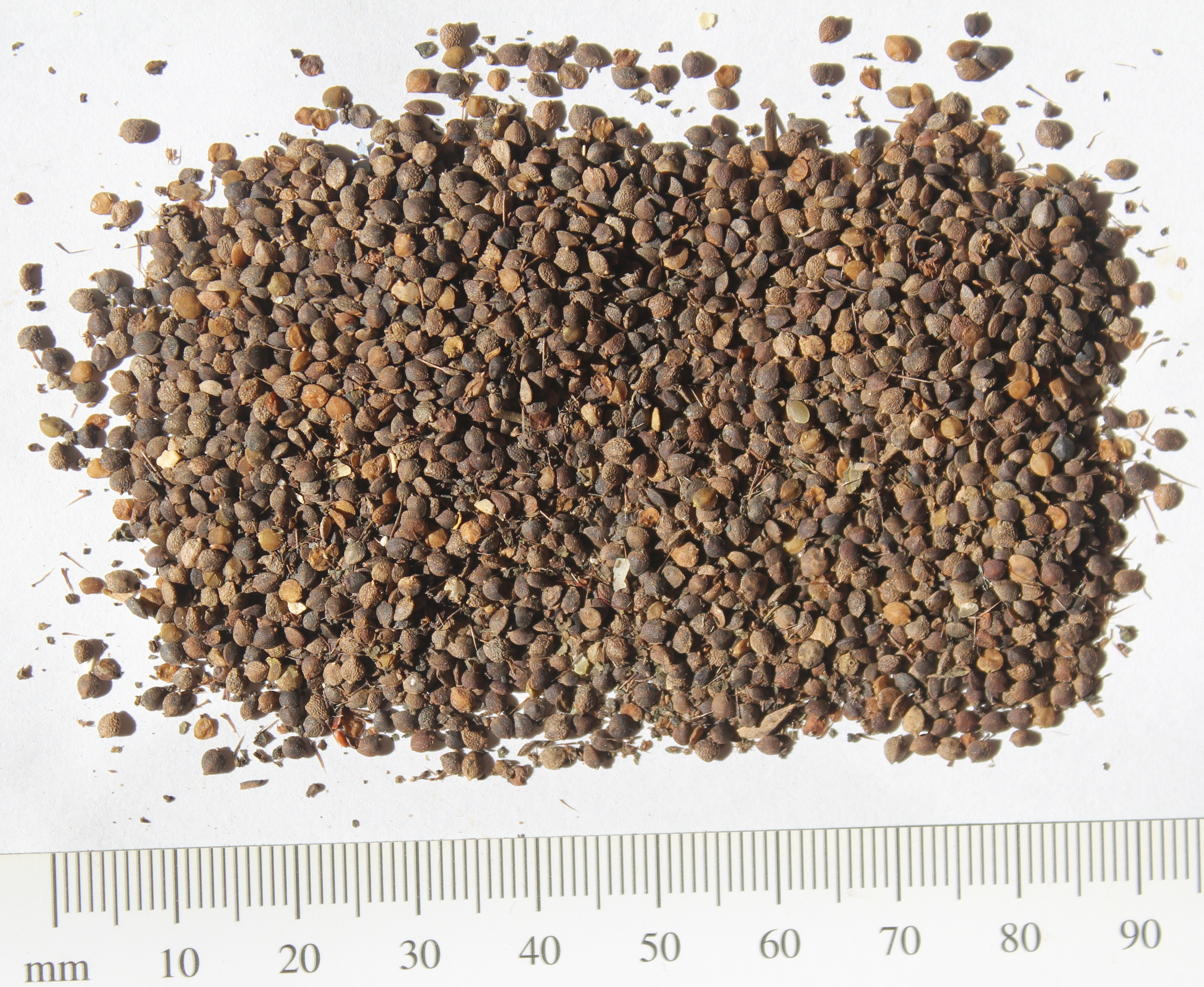
Seeds
