= Mewahang =

Mewahang Rai are a linguistic group and an indigenous community, one of the major subgroups of Rai people in eastern Nepal.

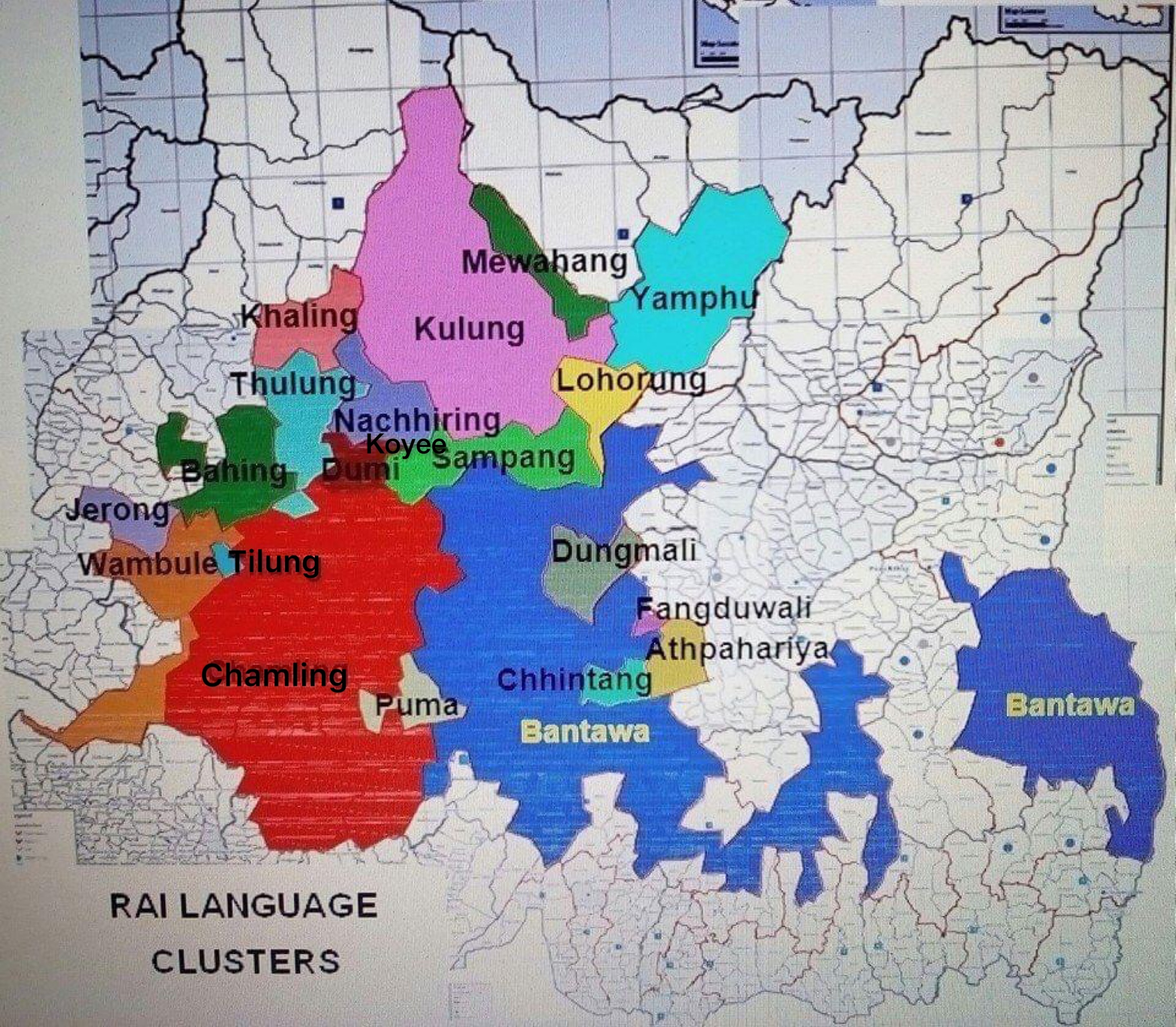
Traditional terrtitory of Mewahang linguistic Rai-Subgroup some areas of Sankhuwasabha District Eastern Nepal Province No. 1
