= Santa Bahadur Rai =

Nepali politician

- सन्त बहादुर राई
- Born: November 2, 1936 (age 89); Pangma, Khandbari, Nepal
- Education: Michigan State University
- Spouse: Lalita Muni Rai

Santa Bahadur Rai(सन्त बहादुर राई: Lohorung, November 2, 1936) is former chairman of National planning commission and secretary of Ministry of Housing and physical planning of the government of Nepal.

== Education ==
- 1954: S.L.C (School Leaving Certificate), Government High School Darjeeling, India
- 1954 - 1956: I.Sc (Intermediate of Science), Government College Darjeeling, India
- 1956 - 1958: B.A. (Bachelor of Arts), Government College Darjeeling, India
- 1959 - 1961: B.Ed. (Bachelor of Education), Tribhuwan University Kathmandu, Nepal
- 1967 - 1969: M. Sc. (Master of Science), Michigan State University, United States

== Career ==
- Chairman (Public Service Commission)
- Secretary (Ministry of Local Development, Ministry of Supply, Ministry of Housing and physical planning)
- Member of Raj Parishad
- Member, Aug.1991 to 1993 Constitutional Public Service Commission Position Kamal Pokhari, Kathmandu
- Chairman, Jan. 1994 to Nov. 3 2001 Chairman Public Service Commission Kamal Pokhari, Kathmandu
- Secretary, 1988-27 Aug 1991 Executive Chief of the Ministry of Housing and Physical Ministry Planning, His Majesty's Government
- Secretary, 1986–1987, Executive Chief of the Ministry of Local Development Ministry His Majesty's Government
- Secretary, 1984-1986 Executive Chief of the Ministry of Supply, His Majesty's Government
- Additional Secretary, 1986-1987 Executive Chief of the Ministry of Panchyat and Ministry of Local Development His Majesty's Government
- Director General, Feb 1977 – Oct 1981 Ministry of Panchyat and Local Development His Majesty's Government
- Deputy Director, Jul 1972 – Jan 1977 Ministry of Panchyat and Ministry of Local Development, His Majesty's Government
- Chief Districts Officer (CDO), Oct 1969 – Jun 1972
- Local Development Officer, Apr 1961 – Sep 1969 (including 19 months in the US)

== Awards ==
- Gorkha Dakshina Bahu
- Gorkha Dakshina Bahu (Fourth)
