= Garja Man Rai =

Bhutanese politician

Member of the National Assembly of Bhutan
- Incumbent
- Assumed office 31 October 2018
- Preceded by: Novin Darlami
- Constituency: Sergithang-Tsirang-Toed

Personal details
- Born: c. 1984 or early 1985
- Party: Druk Nyamrup Tshogpa (DNT)

Garja Man Rai is a Bhutanese politician who has been a member of the National Assembly of Bhutan, since October 2018.

== Education ==
He holds a Bachelor of Science in Information Technology degree from India.

== Political career ==
Before joining politics, he worked as an IT engineer.

He was elected to the National Assembly of Bhutan as a candidate of DNT from Sergithang-Tsirang-Toed constituency in 2018 Bhutanese National Assembly election. He received 6,077 votes and defeated Kewal Ram Adhakari, a candidate of DPT.
