= Salpa Pokhari =

Lake in Nepal

- Location within Nepal
- Interactive map of Salpa Pokhari
- Location: Bhojpur District, Nepal
- Coordinates: 27°26′47″N 86°56′01″E
- Designation: Lake
- Surface elevation: 3,443 metres (11,296 ft)

Salpa Pokhari (Nepali: साल्पा पोखरी) or Salpa Pond is a natural lake located in Dobhane village, Bhojpur District, Nepal. The lake lies at an altitude of 3443 metres and drains into the Sunkoshi River watershed.

Four festivals are celebrated at the lake every year on the full-moon days of Baisakh Purnima, Rishi Purnima, Kartik Purnima and Mangsir Purnima. The lake is visited by Kirat, Hindu, and Buddhist pilgrims.
