= Patuk Don =

Patuk Don or Patuk Deon (Nep; पटुक दोँ) is a mound that is believed to be the ruin of Kirat King Patuk's palace at Patan, Nepal. It is still visible in Lalitpur Patan Mangal Bazar, though large part of the palace has been encroached on by local people.
