= Tek Bahadur Rai =

Bhutanese politician

Member of the National Assembly of Bhutan
- Incumbent
- Assumed office 31 October 2018
- Preceded by: Rinzin Dorje
- Constituency: Shompangkha

Personal details
- Born: c. 1978
- Party: Druk Nyamrup Tshogpa (DNT)

Tek Bahadur Rai is a Bhutanese politician who has been a member of the National Assembly of Bhutan, since October 2018.

== Education ==
He holds a Bachelor of Technology degree from Ajmer Institute of Engineering and Technology, Rajasthan.

== Political career ==
Before joining politics, he was a civil engineer and worked as a project engineer.

He was elected to the National Assembly of Bhutan as a candidate of DNT from Shompangkha constituency in 2018 Bhutanese National Assembly election. He received 7,018 votes and defeated Deo Kumar Rimal, a candidate of DPT.
