= Ubhauli =

Kirat festival celebrate to pray mother nature for good harvest

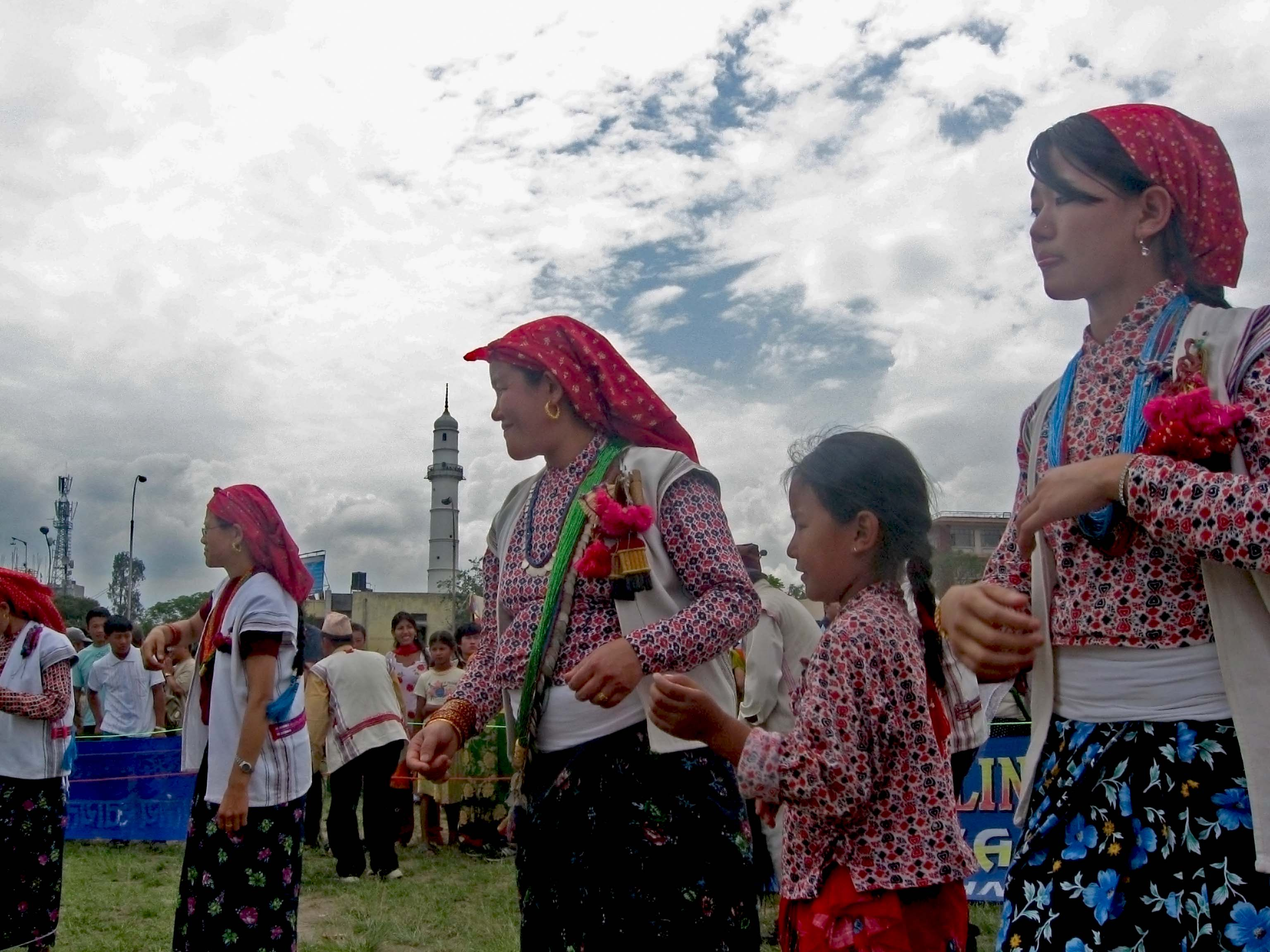
- Ubhauli celebration by Kirat people
- Also called: Sakela
- Observed by: Kirat communities
- Type: Kirat festival
- Observances: Prayers and religious rituals
- Date: April–May (lunar calendar)
- Frequency: Annual

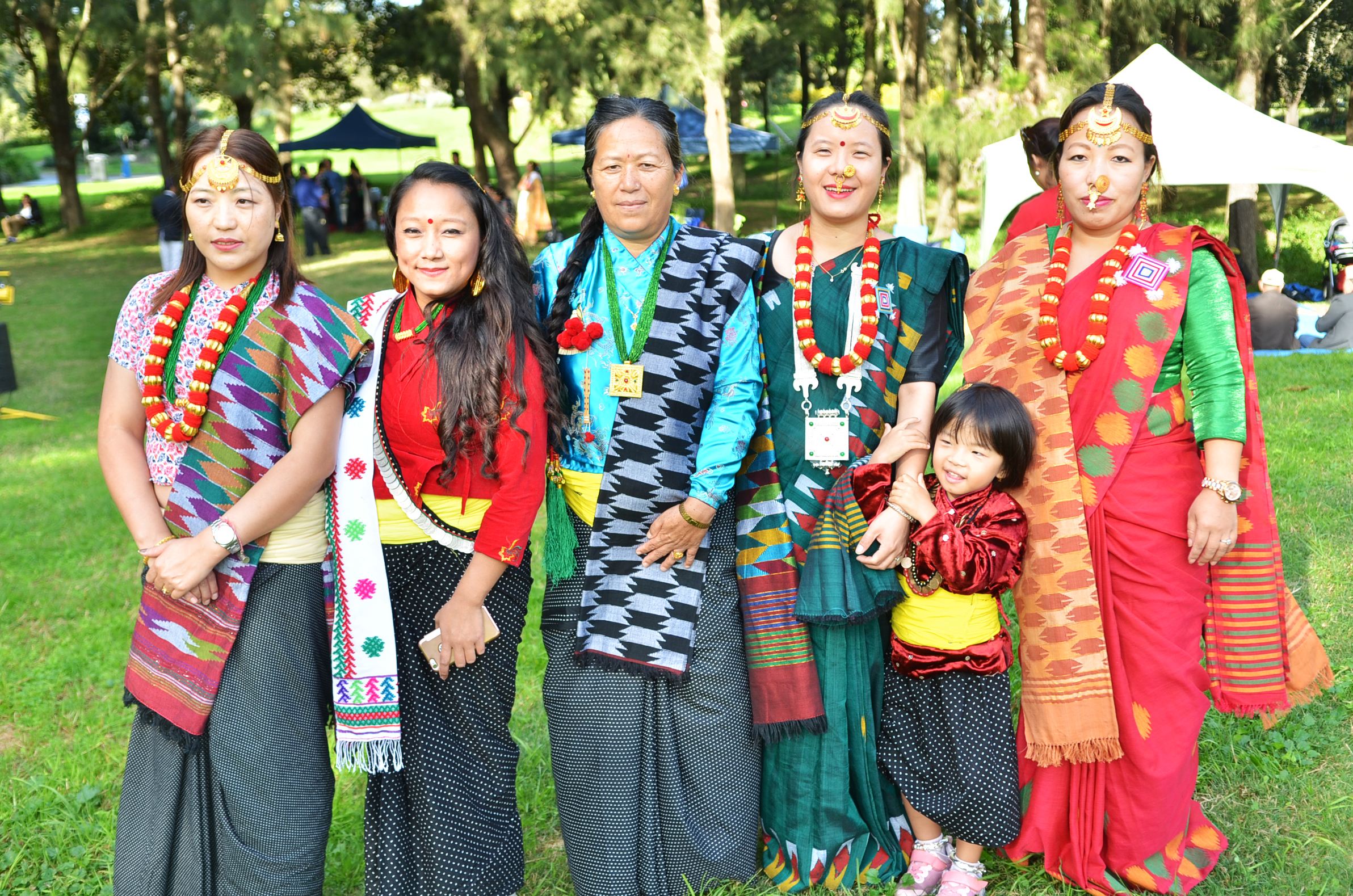
Women in cultural costume at Ubhauli Kirati festival 2017 at Gough Whitlam Park, Sydney, Australia

Ubhauli (Nepali: उभौली, lit. 'going up') is a festival of the Kirat communities of Sunuwar, Limbu, Yakkha and Rai of Nepal, India and around the world by Kirati people celebrated every year, marking the migration phase upwards towards the hilly regions when the summer season arrives. The migration from the hills to areas at lower altitude is called Udhauli (downwards), which is also an annual festival of these communities. Sakela is a dance performed during the festival. On the Ubhauli festival day, the Kirat people pray to mother nature for healthy crops and protection from natural calamities in that year.

== See also ==
- Udhauli
