= Jhyamta =

Nepali traditional musical instrument

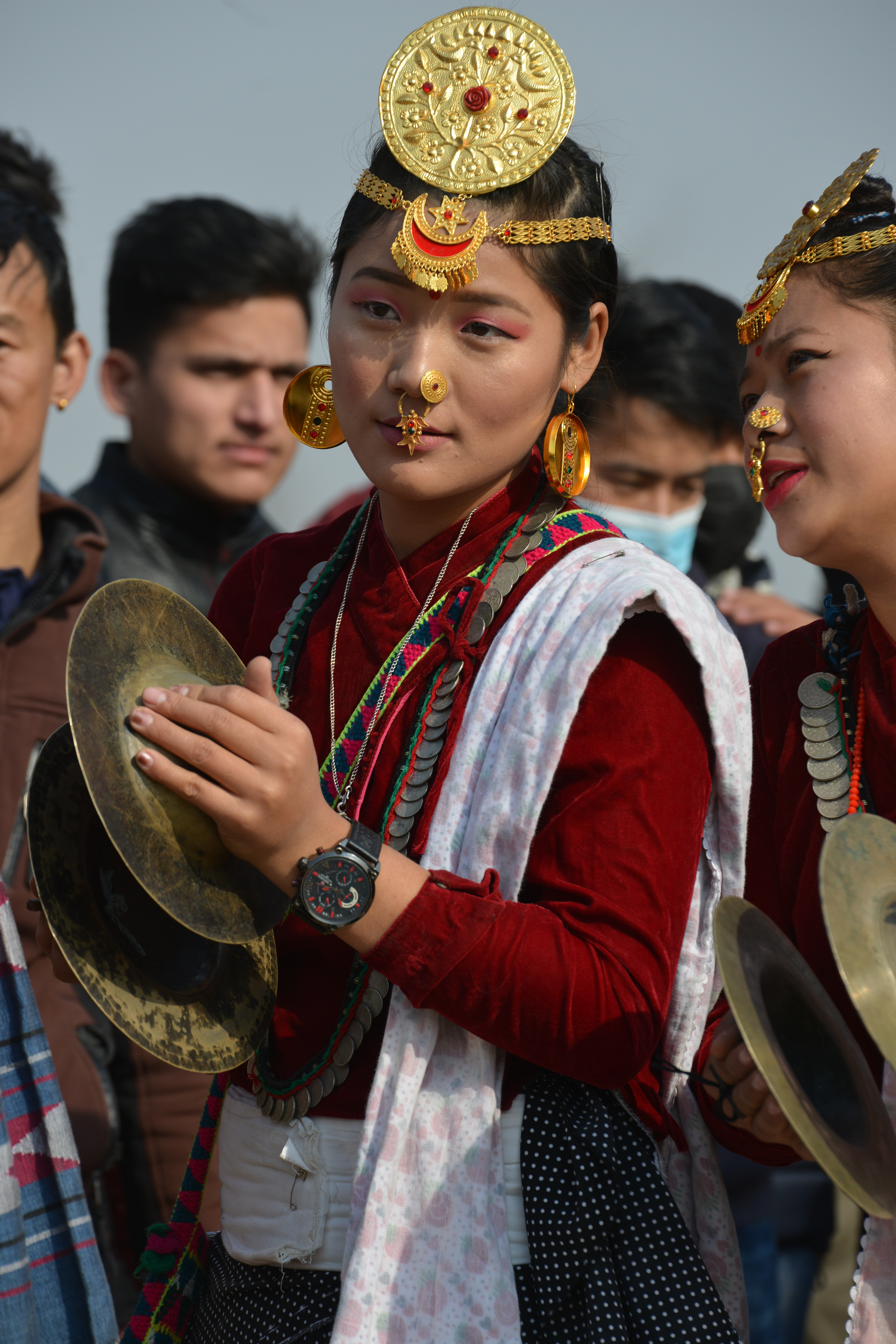
Kirat girl with Jhyamta cymbals in festival

The Jhyamta (Nepali: झ्याम्टा) (phonetic: Jhyāmṭā) is a Nepali traditional musical instrument played by artist of Nepal. It looks similar to cymbal. Kirat community uses this with Dhol in various cultural festivals such as Sakela, Chyabrung, Udhauli, Ubhauli and other social functions.

This is also known as the Taal. The Taal (also called Manjira, Jhanjh, or Jalra) is a traditional Indian clash cymbal instrument used primarily in devotional, folk and classical music.
