= Bahing language =

Language spoken in Nepal

Bahing
- Region: Nepal
- Ethnicity: Bahing
- Native speakers: 12,000 (2011 census)
- Language family: Sino-Tibetan: Kiranti; Western; Sunwari; Bahing

Official status
- Official language in: Nepal

Language codes
- ISO 639-3: bhj
- Glottolog: bahi1252
- ELP: Bahing

Bahing (also known as Paiwa, Dungmowa, Rukhusalu, Waripsawa, Timriwa, Dhimriwa, Nayango, Dhayango, Khaliwa/Khaluwa, Rendukpa/Rendu, Rungbu) is a language spoken by 14449 people (census 2021) of the Bahing ethnic group in Nepal. It belongs to the family of Kiranti languages, a subgroup of Sino-Tibetan.

Bahing is one of the ethnicities present in Nepal which consist of the following ancestors: Paiwa, Dungmowa, Rukhusalu, Waripsawa, Timriwa, Dhimriwa, Nayango, Dhayango, Khaliwa/Khaluwa, Rendukpa/Rendu, and Rungbu. These ancestors spoke the Bahing language.

The group Rumdali is also known as Nechali among some of them.

== Names ==
Ethnologue lists the following alternate names for Bahing: Baying, Ikke lo, Kiranti-Bahing, Pai Lo, Radu lo. Procha lo

== Geographical distribution ==
Bahing is spoken in the following locations of Nepal (Ethnologue).

- Northeastern Okhaldhunga District, Sagarmatha Zone: Harkapur, Ragdip, Bigutar, Baruneswor, Okhaldhunga, Rumjatar, Barnalu, Mamkha, Ratmate, Serna, Diyale, and Bhadaure VDC's (Rumdali dialect)
- Mid-southeastern Okhaldhunga District: Ketuke, Moli, Waksa, and Ubu VDC's (Tolocha dialect)
- Southern tip of Solukhumbu District: Necha Batase and Salyan VDC's
- Khotang District

== Dialects ==
According to Ethnologue, Bahing consists of the Rumdali, Nechali, Tolacha, Moblocha, and Hangu dialects, with 85% or above intelligibility among all dialects.

== Documentation ==
The Bahing language was described by Brian Houghton Hodgson (1857, 1858) as having a very complex verbal morphology. By the 1970s, only vestiges were left, making Bahing a case study of grammatical attrition and language death.

== Phonology ==
Bahing and the related Khaling language have synchronic ten-vowel systems. The difference of [mərə] "monkey" vs. [mɯrɯ] "human being" is difficult to perceive for speakers of even neighboring dialects, which makes for "an unlimited source of fun to the Bahing people".

=== Vowels ===
Vowel phonemes
	Front		Central		Back			
	unrounded		unrounded		unrounded		rounded	
	short	long	short	long	short	long	short	long
High	i ⟨इ⟩	iː ⟨इः⟩			ɯ ⟨उ़⟩	ɯː ⟨उ़ः⟩	u ⟨उ⟩	uː ⟨उः⟩
High-mid	e ⟨ए⟩	eː ⟨एः⟩			ɤ ⟨ओ़⟩	ɤː ⟨ओ़ः⟩	o ⟨ओ⟩	oː ⟨ओः⟩
Low-mid	ɛ ⟨ए़⟩		ʌ ⟨अ⟩	ʌː ⟨अः⟩				
Low			ä ⟨आ⟩	äː ⟨आः⟩				

- Bahing language has no long vowel /ɛ/.

=== Consonants ===
Bahing consonant phonemes
			Bilabial	Dental	Apico- alveolar	Lamino- alveolar	Palatal	Velar	Glottal
Nasal			m ⟨म⟩		n ⟨न⟩			ŋ ⟨ङ⟩	
Plosive/ Affricate	implosive		ɓ ⟨ळ⟩						
Plosive/ Affricate	voiceless	unaspirated	p ⟨प⟩	t̪ ⟨त⟩	t ⟨ट⟩	t͡s ⟨च⟩		k ⟨क⟩	ʔ
Plosive/ Affricate	voiceless	aspirated	pʰ ⟨फ⟩	t̪ʰ ⟨थ⟩	tʰ ⟨ठ⟩	t͡sʰ ⟨छ⟩		kʰ ⟨ख⟩	
Plosive/ Affricate	voiced	unaspirated	b ⟨ब⟩	d̪ ⟨द⟩	d ⟨ड⟩	d͡z ⟨ज⟩		ɡ ⟨ग⟩	
Plosive/ Affricate	voiced	aspirated	bʱ ⟨भ⟩	d̪ʱ ⟨ध⟩	dʱ ⟨ढ⟩	d͡zʱ ⟨झ⟩		ɡʱ ⟨घ⟩	
Fricative					s ⟨स⟩				ɦ ⟨ह⟩
Trill					r ⟨र⟩				
Lateral					l ⟨ल⟩				
Approximant			w ⟨व⟩				j ⟨य⟩		

- Bahing has its unique sound /ɓ/ ळ.
- Nowadays use ट, ठ, ड, ढ, have disappeared or are less used.

== Morphology ==
Hodgson (1857) reported a middle voice formed by a suffix -s(i) added to the verbal stem, corresponding to reflexives in other Kiranti languages.
