= Chisankhugadhi Rural Municipality =

Chishankhugadhi Rural Municipality चिशंखुगढी गाउँपालिका
- Rural Municipality
- Nickname: Chishankhu
- Motto(s): "कृषि, पर्यटन, र दिगो पूर्वाधार, समृद्ध चिशंखुगढीको बलियो आधार"
- Location in Koshi Province Chishankhugadhi Rural Municipality (Nepal)
- Coordinates: 27.32°N 86.63°E
- Province: Koshi Province
- District: Okhaldhunga
- Wards: 8
- Established: 10 March 2017

Government
  - Type: Rural Council
  - Chairperson: Mr. Nishant Sharma (NCP)
  - Vice-chairperson: Mr. Santosh Babu Thapa (Nepali Congress)

Area
  - Total: 126.91 km^{2} (49.00 sq mi)

Population (2021)
  - Total: 13,844
  - Density: 109.09/km^{2} (282.53/sq mi)
- Time zone: UTC+5:45 (Nepal Standard Time)
- Headquarter: Serna
- Website: official website

Chishankhugadhi (Nepali: चिशंखुगढी गाउँपालिका) is a rural municipality (gaunpalika) out of seven rural municipality located in Okhaldhunga District of Koshi Province of Nepal. There are a total of 8 municipalities in Okhaldhunga in which 1 is urban and 7 are rural.

According to Ministry of Federal Affairs and Local Developme Chishankhugadhi has an area of 126.91 square kilometres (49.00 mi^{2}) and the total population of the municipality was 15196 as of Census of Nepal 2011. and 13844 as of census 2021.

Kuibhir, Pokhare, Diyale, Ratmate, Serna, Bhadaure and Mamkha which previously were all separate Village development committee merged to form this new local level body. Fulfilling the requirement of the new Constitution of Nepal 2015, Ministry of Federal Affairs and Local Development replaced all old VDCs and Municipalities into 753 new local level body (Municipality).

The rural municipality is divided into total 8 wards and the headquarter of this newly formed rural municipality is situated in Serna.

== Demographics ==
At the time of the 2011 Nepal census, Chisankhugadhi Rural Municipality had a population of 15,206. Of these, 59.4% spoke Nepali, 16.8% Magar, 10.3% Bahing, 3.2% Sherpa, 3.0% Tamang, 3.0% Thulung, 2.4% Rai, 1.2% Majhi and 0.7% other languages as their first language.

In terms of ethnicity/caste, 20.7% were Chhetri, 19.7% Magar, 12.6% Hill Brahmin, 7.6% Rai, 5.5% Newar, 5.1% Kami, 4.7% Bahing, 4.5% Sarki, 3.8% Gharti/Bhujel and 15.8% others.

In terms of religion, 80.7% were Hindu, 12.0% Kirati, 6.4% Buddhist, 0.6% Christian and 0.3% others.
