= Manebhanjyang Rural Municipality =

Rural Municipality in Province No. 1, Nepal

Manebhanjyang मानेभञ्ज्याङ्ग गाउँपालिका
- Rural Municipality
- Location in Province No. 1 Manebhanjyang (Nepal)
- Coordinates: 27.233333°N 86.45°E
- Province: Province No. 1
- District: Okhaldhunga
- Wards: 10
- Established: 10 March 2017

Government
  - Type: Rural Council
  - Chairperson: Mr. Gyanendra Rumdali (NC)
  - Vice-chairperson: Mr. Aasrachan Rai (NC)

Area
  - Total: 146.61 km^{2} (56.61 sq mi)

Population (2011)2014
  - Total: 210,823
  - Density: 1,438.0/km^{2} (3,724.4/sq mi)
- Time zone: UTC+5:45 (Nepal Standard Time)
- Headquarter: Manebhanjyang
- Website: official website

Manebhanjyang (Nepali: मानेभञ्ज्याङ्ग गाउँपालिका) is a rural municipality (gaunpalika) out of seven rural municipality located in Okhaldhunga District of Province No. 1 of Nepal. There are a total of 8 municipalities in Okhaldhunga in which 1 is urban and 7 are rural.

According to Ministry of Federal Affairs and Local Developme Manebhanjyang has an area of 146.61 square kilometres (56.61 mi^{2}) and the total population of the municipality is 21082 as of Census of Nepal 2011.

Moli, Baksa, Nepal, Ubu, Nepal, Ketuke, Manebhanjyang, Thakle, Thoksela and Madhavpur which previously were all separate Village development committee merged to form this new local level body. Fulfilling the requirement of the new Constitution of Nepal 2015, Ministry of Federal Affairs and Local Development replaced all old VDCs and Municipalities into 753 new local level body (Municipality).

The rural municipality is divided into total 9 wards and the headquarter of this newly formed rural municipality is situated in Manebhanjyang.

== Demographics ==
At the time of the 2011 Nepal census, Manebhanjyang Rural Municipality had a population of 21,093. Of these, 33.4% spoke Wambule, 33.0% Nepali, 15.3% Magar, 6.3% Tamang, 6.0% Bahing, 2.0% Jerung, 2.0% Rai, 0.9% Newar and 1.1% other languages as their first language.

In terms of ethnicity/caste, 40.4% were Rai, 16.3% Magar, 9.9% Chhetri, 6.5% Newar, 6.4% Tamang, 6.1% Hill Brahmin, 4.3% Kami, 3.4% Damai/Dholi, 2.0% Bahing and 4.7% others.

In terms of religion, 51.1% were Hindu, 39.3% Kirati, 8.4% Buddhist, 0.9% Christian and 0.3% others.

== Climate ==
Climate data for Manebhanjyang, elevation 1,576 m (5,171 ft)
Month	Jan	Feb	Mar	Apr	May	Jun	Jul	Aug	Sep	Oct	Nov	Dec	Year
Mean daily maximum °C (°F)	15.1 (59.2)	16.9 (62.4)	21.4 (70.5)	24.7 (76.5)	25.3 (77.5)	25.6 (78.1)	25.0 (77.0)	24.9 (76.8)	24.2 (75.6)	23.3 (73.9)	20.1 (68.2)	16.7 (62.1)	21.9 (71.5)
Mean daily minimum °C (°F)	2.3 (36.1)	3.8 (38.8)	7.3 (45.1)	12.0 (53.6)	14.7 (58.5)	17.1 (62.8)	17.7 (63.9)	17.3 (63.1)	16.1 (61.0)	13.0 (55.4)	7.0 (44.6)	3.2 (37.8)	11.0 (51.7)
Average precipitation mm (inches)	14.8 (0.58)	12.2 (0.48)	23.1 (0.91)	45.9 (1.81)	102.0 (4.02)	197.4 (7.77)	281.0 (11.06)	217.9 (8.58)	131.4 (5.17)	41.2 (1.62)	6.3 (0.25)	7.2 (0.28)	1,080.4 (42.53)
Source 1: Australian National University
Source 2: Japan International Cooperation Agency (precipitation)
