= Likhu Rural Municipality, Okhaldhunga =

Likhu
- Rural Municipality
- Location in Province No. 1 Likhu (Nepal)
- Coordinates: 27.3132°N 86.299°E
- Province: Province No. 1
- District: Okhaldhunga
- Wards: 9
- Established: 10 March 2017

Government
  - Type: Rural Council
  - Chairperson: Mr. Ashok Kumar Karki (NCP)
  - Vice-chairperson: Mrs. Ashmita Thapa (NCP)

Area
  - Total: 88.03 km^{2} (33.99 sq mi)

Population (2022)
  - Total: 13,770
  - Density: 156.4/km^{2} (405.1/sq mi)
- Time zone: UTC+5:45 (Nepal Standard Time)
- Headquarter: Yasam
- Website: official website

Likhu (Nepali: लिखु गाउँपालिका) is a rural municipality (gaunpalika) out of seven rural municipality located in Okhaldhunga District of Province No. 1 of Nepal. There are a total of 8 municipalities in Okhaldhunga in which 1 is urban and 7 are rural.

According to Ministry of Federal Affairs and Local Developme Likhu has an area of 88.03 square kilometres (33.99 mi^{2}) and the total population of the municipality is 13770 as of 2021 Census Nepal.

Singhadevi, Narmedeshwar, Yasam, Gamnangtar, Tarkerabari and Pokali which previously were all separate Village development committee merged to form this new local level body. Fulfilling the requirement of the new Constitution of Nepal 2015, Ministry of Federal Affairs and Local Development replaced all old VDCs and Municipalities into 753 new local level body (Municipality).

The rural municipality is divided into total 9 wards and the headquarter of this newly formed rural municipality is situated in Yasam.

== Demographics ==
At the time of the 2011 Nepal census, Likhu Rural Municipality had a population of 14,057. Of these, 81.0% spoke Nepali, 8.7% Tamang, 4.7% Magar, 2.2% Sherpa, 2.2% Sunwar, 0.7% Newar, 0.2% Maithili, 0.1% Rai and 0.2% other languages as their first language.

In terms of ethnicity/caste, 42.9% were Chhetri, 9.1% Tamang, 8.9% Hill Brahmin, 8.1% Magar, 7.7% Newar, 5.7% Sarki, 3.6% Damai/Dholi, 2.9% Kami, 2.3% Sunuwar and 8.8% others.

In terms of religion, 87.7% were Hindu, 11.0% Buddhist, 0.9% Christian, 0.1% Kirati and 0.3% others.
