= Molung Rural Municipality =

Molung मोलुङ गाउँपालिका
- Rural Municipality
- Location in Province No. 1 Molung (Nepal)
- Coordinates: 27.366667°N 86.433333°E
- Province: Province No. 1
- District: Okhaldhunga
- Wards: 8
- Established: 10 March 2017

Government
  - Type: Rural Council
  - Chairperson: Mr. Uttam Rai (CPN UML)
  - Vice-chairperson: Ms. Urmila Khatiwada (CPN UML)

Area
  - Total: 112 km^{2} (43 sq mi)

Population (2011)
  - Total: 15,862
  - Density: 142/km^{2} (367/sq mi)
- Time zone: UTC+5:45 (Nepal Standard Time)
- Headquarter: Prapcha
- Website: official website

Molung (Nepali: मोलुङ गाउँपालिका) is a rural municipality (gaunpalika) out of seven rural municipalities located in Okhaldhunga District of Province No. 1 of Nepal. There are a total of 8 municipalities in Okhaldhunga in which 1 is urban and 7 are rural.

According to Ministry of Federal Affairs and Local Developme Molung has an area of 112 square kilometres (43 mi^{2}) and the total population of the municipality is 15862 as of Census of Nepal 2011.

Kuntadevi, Baraneshwar, Harkapur, Prapcha, Shreechaur, Patle and Ragadip which previously were all separate Village development committee merged to form this new local level body. Fulfilling the requirement of the new Constitution of Nepal 2015, Ministry of Federal Affairs and Local Development replaced all old VDCs and Municipalities into 753 new local level body (Municipality).

The rural municipality is divided into total 8 wards and the headquarter of this newly formed rural municipality is situated in Prapcha.

== Demographics ==
At the time of the 2011 Nepal census, Molung Rural Municipality had a population of 16,274. Of these, 57.3% spoke Nepali, 14.7% Tamang, 12.7% Sherpa, 5.6% Bahing, 4.3% Sunwar, 3.1% Rai, 1.4% Magar and 0.9% other languages as their first language.

In terms of ethnicity/caste, 20.6% were Hill Brahmin, 16.1% Tamang, 15.6% Chhetri, 12.7% Sherpa, 9.2% Rai, 5.6% Kami, 4.6% Sunuwar, 4.3% Damai/Dholi, 2.8% Magar and 8.5% others.

In terms of religion, 64.3% were Hindu, 27.9% Buddhist, 6.2% Kirati, 1.3% Christian and 0.3% others.
