= Khijiidemba Rural Municipality =

Khijidemba खिजिदेम्बा गाउँपालिका
- Rural Municipality
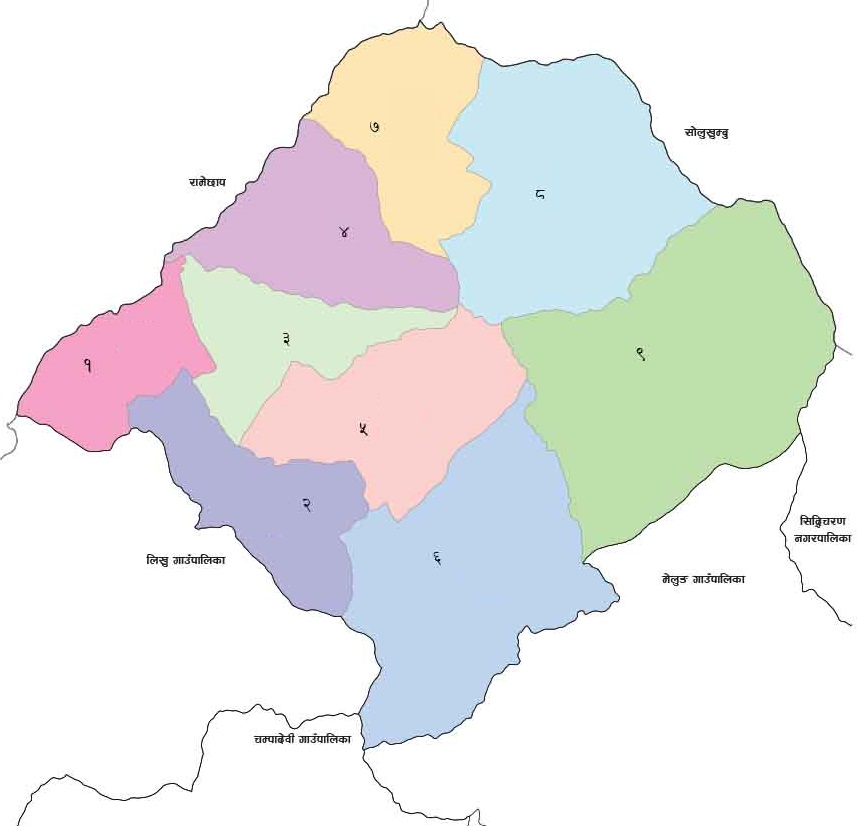
- Ward-level map of Khijidemba Rural Municipality, Nepal

- Location in Province No. 1 Khijidemba (Nepal)
- Coordinates: 27.43°N 86.37°E
- Province: Province No. 1
- District: Okhaldhunga
- Wards: 9
- Established: 10 March 2017

Government
  - Type: Rural Council
  - Chairperson: Mr. Gombu Sherpa (Janta Samajawadi Parti)
  - Vice-chairperson: Mrs. Shushila Tamang (NC)

Area
  - Total: 171.77 km^{2} (66.32 sq mi)

Population (2011)
  - Total: 15,106
  - Density: 87.943/km^{2} (227.77/sq mi)
- Time zone: UTC+5:45 (Nepal Standard Time)
- Headquarter: Khijiphalate
- Website: official website

Khijidemba (Nepali: खिजिदेम्बा गाउँपालिका) is a part of Khiji Chandeshwari it has 2017 rural municipality (gaunpalika) out of seven rural municipality located in Okhaldhunga District of Province No. 1 of Nepal. There are a total of 8 municipalities in Okhaldhunga in which 1 is urban and 7 are rural.

According to Ministry of Federal Affairs and Local Developme Khijidemba has an area of 171.77 square kilometres (66.32 mi^{2}) and the total population of the municipality is 15106 as of Census of Nepal 2011.

Ragani, Khiji Chandeshwari original Area, Khijikati, Khijiphalate, part of Pokli, Rawadolu, part of Patle and Bhussinga which previously were all separate Village development committee merged to form this new local level body. Fulfilling the requirement of the new Constitution of Nepal 2015, Ministry of Federal Affairs and Local Development replaced all old VDCs and Municipalities into 753 new local level body (Municipality).

The rural municipality is divided into total 9 wards and the headquarter of this newly formed rural municipality is situated in Khijiphalate.

== Demographics ==
At the time of the 2011 Nepal census, Khijidemba Rural Municipality had a population of 15,291. Of these, 37.3% spoke Nepali, 26.5% Sherpa, 16.6% Tamang, 12.3% Sunuwar, 4.9% Bhojpuri, 1.6% Newar, 0.2% Haryanvi, 0.2% Magar and 0.4% other languages as their first language.

In terms of ethnicity/caste, 26.5% were Sherpa, 18.0% Tamang, 14.0% Chhetri, 12.8% Sunuwar, 9.1% Newar, 4.9% Kanu, 3.5% Bishowkarma, 3.1% Hill Brahmin, 2.3% Gharti/Bhujel and 5.8% others.

In terms of religion, 52.8% were Hindu, 44.2% Buddhist, 2.7% Christian, 0.1% Prakriti, 0.1% Kirati and 0.1% others.
