= Champadevi Rural Municipality =

Champadevi चम्पादेवी गाउँपालिका
- Rural Municipality
- Location in Province No. 1 Champadevi (Nepal)
- Coordinates: 27.30°N 86.28°E
- Province: Province No. 1
- District: Okhaldhunga
- Wards: 10
- Established: 10 March 2017

Government
  - Type: Rural Council
  - Chairperson: Mr.Nawaraj KC (NC)
  - Vice-chairperson: Mrs. Dilamaya Magar

Area
  - Total: 126.91 km^{2} (49.00 sq mi)

Population (2011)
  - Total: 18,613
  - Density: 146.66/km^{2} (379.86/sq mi)
- Time zone: UTC+5:45 (Nepal Standard Time)
- Headquarter: Kalikadevi
- Website: official website

Champadevi (Nepali: चम्पादेवी गाउँपालिका) is a rural municipality (gaunpalika) out of seven rural municipality located in Okhaldhunga District of Province No. 1 of Nepal. There are a total of 8 municipalities in Okhaldhunga in which 1 is urban and 7 are rural.

According to Ministry of Federal Affairs and Local Developme Champadevi has an area of 126.91 square kilometres (49.00 mi^{2}) and the total population of the municipality is 18613 as of Census of Nepal 2011.

Palapu, Kalikadevi, Phediguth, Phulbari, Sagarmatha, Bilandu and Raniban, Sagarmatha which previously were all separate Village development committee merged to form this new local level body. Fulfilling the requirement of the new Constitution of Nepal 2015, Ministry of Federal Affairs and Local Development replaced all old VDCs and Municipalities into 753 new local level body (Municipality).

The rural municipality is divided into total 10 wards and the headquarter of this newly formed rural municipality is situated in Kalikadevi.

== Demographics ==
At the time of the 2011 Nepal census, Champadevi Rural Municipality had a population of 18,661. Of these, 74.9% spoke Nepali, 12.3% Magar, 6.5% Tamang, 4.5% Newar, 1.1% Sherpa, 0.2% Maithili, 0.1% Baram and 0.4% other languages as their first language.

In terms of ethnicity/caste, 41.9% were Chhetri, 14.0% Magar, 6.8% Tamang, 6.3% Newar, 6.0% Hill Brahmin, 5.2% Sunuwar, 3.9% Damai/Dholi, 3.4% Kami, 3.1% Sarki and 9.4% others.

In terms of religion, 90.7% were Hindu, 7.9% Buddhist, 0.6% Christian, 0.2% Prakriti, 0.1% Muslim and 0.5% others.
