= Sunkoshi Rural Municipality, Okhaldhunga =

Sunkoshi Rural Municipality सुनकोशी गाउँपालिका
- Rural Municipality
- Location in Province No. 1 Sunkoshi Rural Municipality (Nepal)
- Coordinates: 27.284°N 86.377°E
- Country: Nepal
- Province: Province No. 1
- District: Okhaldhunga District
- Established: March 2017

Government
  - Chairperson: Mr. Kamal Tamang (NC)
  - Vice Chairperson: Mis Sunita Adhikari (NC)

Area
  - Total: 143.75 km^{2} (55.50 sq mi)

Population (2011 Nepal census)
  - Total: 18,550
  - Density: 129.04/km^{2} (334.2/sq mi)
  - Ethnicities: Tamang Chettri
- Website: official website

Sunkoshi Rural Municipality (Nepali: सुनकोशी गाउँपालिका) in Okhaldhunga District was formed in March 2017, by merging 5 former VDCs of Katunje, Chyanam, Mulkharka, Sisneri and Balakhu. The center of this rural municipality is located at Mulkharka.

== Demographics ==
At the time of the 2011 Nepal census, Sunkoshi Rural Municipality had a population of 18,558. Of these, 58.1% spoke Nepali, 18.9% Tamang, 10.8% Magar, 5.6% Jerung, 4.7% Rai, 1.3% Sunwar, 0.1% Maithili and 0.5% other languages as their first language.

In terms of ethnicity/caste, 26.6% were Chhetri, 19.1% Tamang, 12.7% Hill Brahmin, 11.5% Magar, 10.7% Rai, 6.3% Newar, 3.4% Kami, 2.4% Damai/Dholi, 2.1% Sunuwar and 5.2% others.

In terms of religion, 69.5% were Hindu, 19.6% Buddhist, 10.5% Kirati, 0.1% Christian and 0.3% others.
