= Siddhicharan Municipality =

Siddhicharan Municipality सिद्धिचरण नगरपालिका
- Municipality
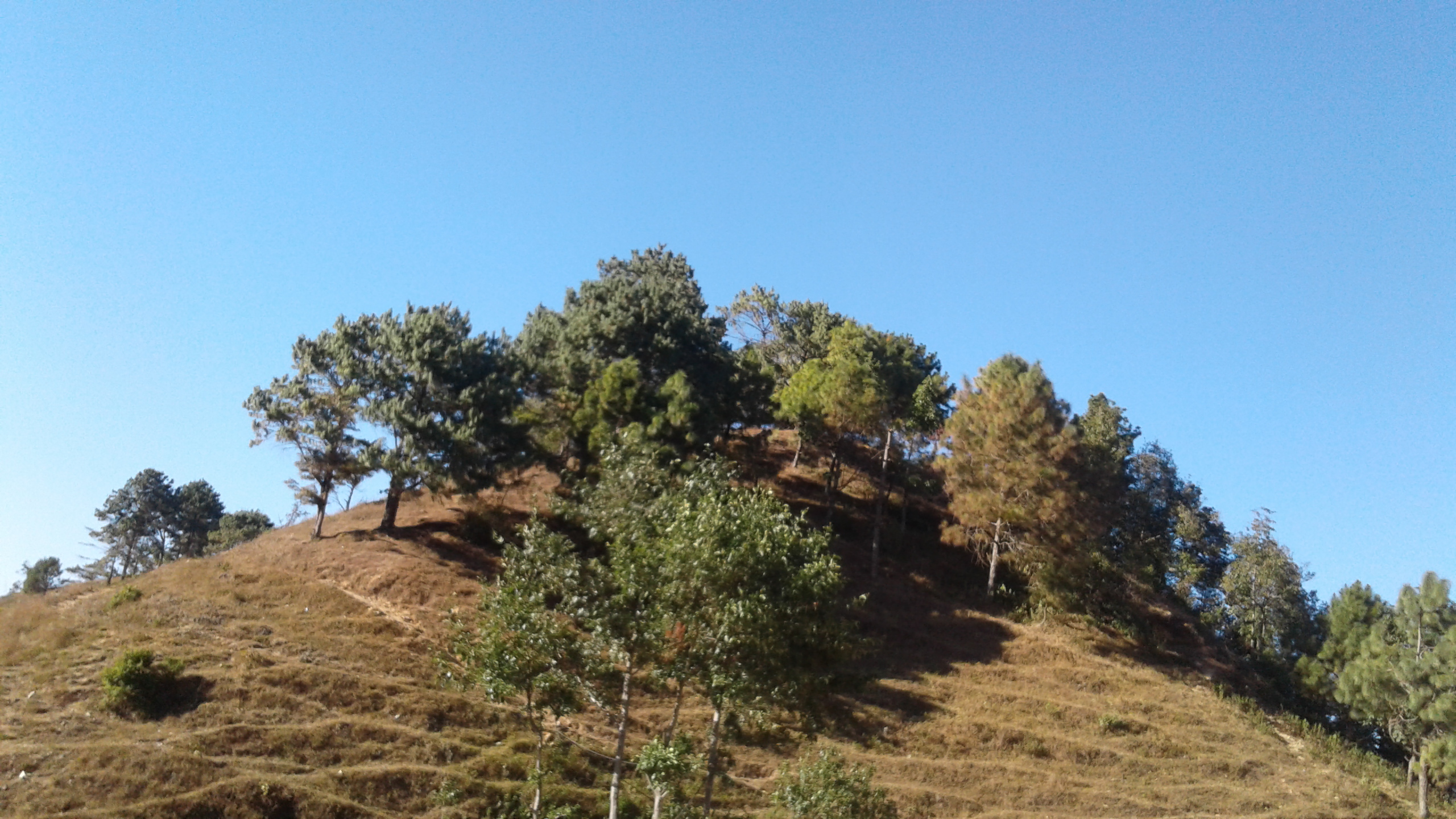
- Okhaldhunga Bajaar Entrance Hill within Siddhicharan Municipality (2018)

- Location of Siddhicharan in map of Koshi Province Siddhicharan Municipality (Nepal)
- Coordinates: 27°19′N 86°30′E
- Country: Nepal
- District: Okhaldhunga District

Government
  - Mayor: तेजन खनाल
  - Deputy Mayor: केदारबाबु बस्नेत

Area
  - Total: 167.88 km^{2} (64.82 sq mi)
- Time zone: UTC+5:45 (NST)
- Postal code: +977
- Website: official website

Siddhicharan is a municipality and the district headquarter of Okhaldhunga District in Koshi Province of Nepal that was established in May 2014 by merging the two former Village development committees Andheri, Thulachhap, Jyamire, Salleri, Rumjatar and Okhaldhunga. It is named after the Nepali poet Siddhicharan Shrestha.

== Demographics ==
At the time of the 2011 Nepal census, Siddhicharan Municipality had a population of 28,844. Of these, 65.5% spoke Nepali, 10.5% Sherpa, 7.7% Magar, 6.5% Bahing, 3.3% Tamang, 2.1% Rai, 0.9% Gurung, 0.7% Maithili, 0.6% Bhujel and 2.2% other languages as their first language.

In terms of ethnicity/caste, 17.8% were Chhetri, 14.0% Hill Brahmin, 13.3% Magar, 11.3% Sherpa, 8.6% Newar, 5.1% Rai, 5.0% Gurung, 4.3% Kami, 3.8% Tamang and 16.8% others.

In terms of religion, 72.8% were Hindu, 19.0% Buddhist, 7.1% Kirati, 0.7% Christian, 0.1% Prakriti and 0.3% others.

== Transportation ==
Rumjatar Airport lies in Old-Rumjatar offering flights to Lukla and Kathmandu.
