= Raniban =

Raniban may refer to:

- Raniban, Bheri, Nepal
- Raniban, Seti, Nepal
- Raniban, Sagarmatha, Nepal
