= Khiji Tholedemba =

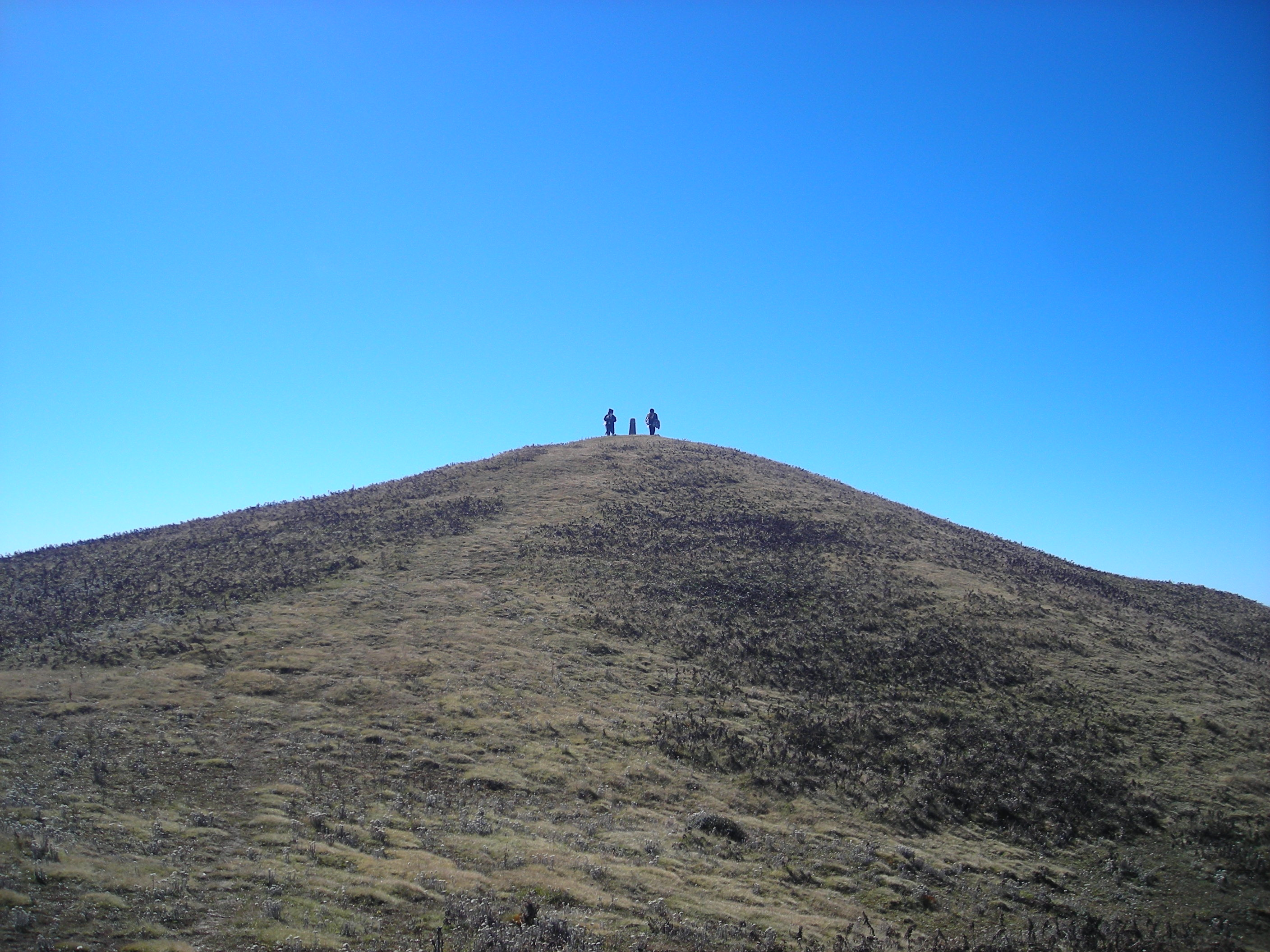

Highest point
- Coordinates: 27°27′52″N 86°23′08″E

Geography
- Location: Khiji Chandeshwori, Nepal

Climbing
- Easiest route: snow

Khiji Tholedemba (Nepali: खिजी थोलेदेम्बा) (3440m) is the highest and the most attractive hill located in western Okhaldhunga district of Nepal. Khiji Tholedemba is located in Khiji Chandeshwori near Khijiphalate and Khijikati in Okhaldhunga district and rest of the hills are located in Dolakha, Ramechhap and Solukhumbu. From Phulchowk (Lalitpur), these hills were used for survey of Mount Everest in the past. The panoramic view of Gaura Parvat, Gaurishankar, Himalayas, Numbur mountain range to Mount Everest can be viewed form Khiji Toledemba. High mountain view, Flora, diverse culture of ethnic groups Sunuwar, Sherpa, Bhuje, Chetri and other minorities are the main attraction of this area.

== Etymology ==
According to the legend, the name Khiji Tholedamba comes from Sunuwar language. The English translation is as follows:

- Khi = House
- Ji, Ja, Cha = name of sunuwar
- Thole = Hill, High, or Top
- Demba = to be heap, mass heap of snow, top of peak

== Transport ==
- Kathmandu to Khiji Chandeswori by bus or by flight
- Phetale to Chilimdanda to Lamje Chuli Daduwa to Mele
- Tholedemba to Phalate Bazar to Khiji Chandeswori to Kathmandu
