= Jyamire =

Jyamire may refer to several places in Nepal:

- Jyamire, Sindhupalchok
- Jyamire, Khotang
- Jyamire, Palpa
- Jyamire, Okhaldhunga
