= Sabin Kumar Tolangi =

- सविन कुमार तोलाङगी
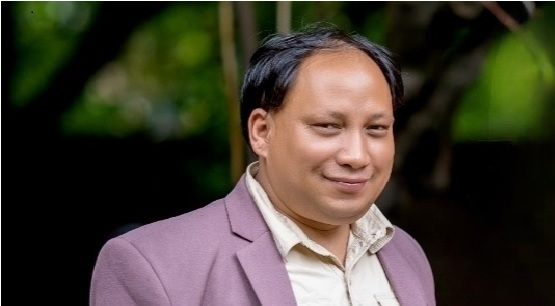
- Born: 23, June, 1989 A.D; Kathmandu Nepal
- Occupations: Movie Producer; Writer; Director
- Years active: 2010-present
- Known for: Director
- Notable work: Rajmahal

Sabin Kumar Tolangi (Nepali: सविन कुमार तोलाङगी) is a film writer and Director of Nepali film Industry. He was born on 23 June 1989 A.D. He is from Champadevi, Okhaldhunga.He has graduated from Oscar International College in writing and directing. He is known for his movie Rajmahal. Tolangi started his career in 2010, and has successfully directed more than 100 music videos. He has been actively involved for more than 15 years in this field. "Manchhe Banaula" is the most popular music video in his directing career.

== Notable work ==
=== Music video ===
SN	Music video	Credit	Cast	Release date	ref
1	Ghin Ghin Ghintang	Director	Dipen khadka/Usha Upreti and Juna Sundas	2022	
2	Badhai Muri Muri 2	Concept/Direction	YONGRAJ PANDEY/ AAYUSHMA KARKI/Parbati giri	2022	
3	Kunai pal	Director	RESHAM GURUNG / ANISHA MAINALI / CHET NARAYAN NEUPANE	2023	
4	Kehi Pritka Kura	Director	Dipen Khadka / Aayushma Karki	2023	
5	Barsha Banera	Director	Cast : Saaya Bhandari/Kabita dhaubhadel and Kusum Thakuri Singer : Jagadish Samal	2017	
6	Choli Syaidiula	Director	Dipen khadka/Smarika dhakal/Parbati giri	2023	
7	Manchhe Banaul	Director	Suprime Malla Thakuri/Bibek Ranabhat & Srijana Acharya	2022	

=== Teleserial ===
SN	Serial name	Story & director :	Episode :	Cast	Producer	Cast television :
1	Utsarga	Sabin Kumar Tolangi and Kp Pathak	1 ,2 & 3	Binod shrestha, Prabha Adhikari, Chet raj, Ganesh Upreti and Radha shrestha	Sabin Kumar Tolangi and Kashiram Bhusal	Aalap Studio & Chhahari Media
2	Chetana	Sabin Kumar Tolangi	1,2,3,4, & 5	Aayushma karki, Bidhya Karki, Resam Gurung, Sabin Kumar Tolangi, Sabina Gopali, Nabin Karki, Aakriti bhattarai, Lukky bhandari, Parbati giri, Dines Sigdel, Sony khatri, Mahendra Shrestha, Chet Narayan Neupane and Kamal Prasad sharma	Kamal Prasad sharma, Ishwari Prasad adhikari and Madhab Gahatraj	Chhahari Media
