= Salleri =

Saleri may refer to:

- Salleri, Bheri
- Salleri, Panchthar
- Salleri, Solukhumbu
- Salleri, Okhaldhunga
