= Katunje =

Former Village Development Committee in Nepal

Katunje कटुञ्जे
- Village development committee
- Location in Nepal
- Coordinates: 27.32°N 86.40°E
- Country: Nepal
- Zone: Sagarmatha Zone
- District: Okhaldhunga District

Population (1991)
  - Total: 4,027
- Time zone: UTC+5:45 (Nepal Time)

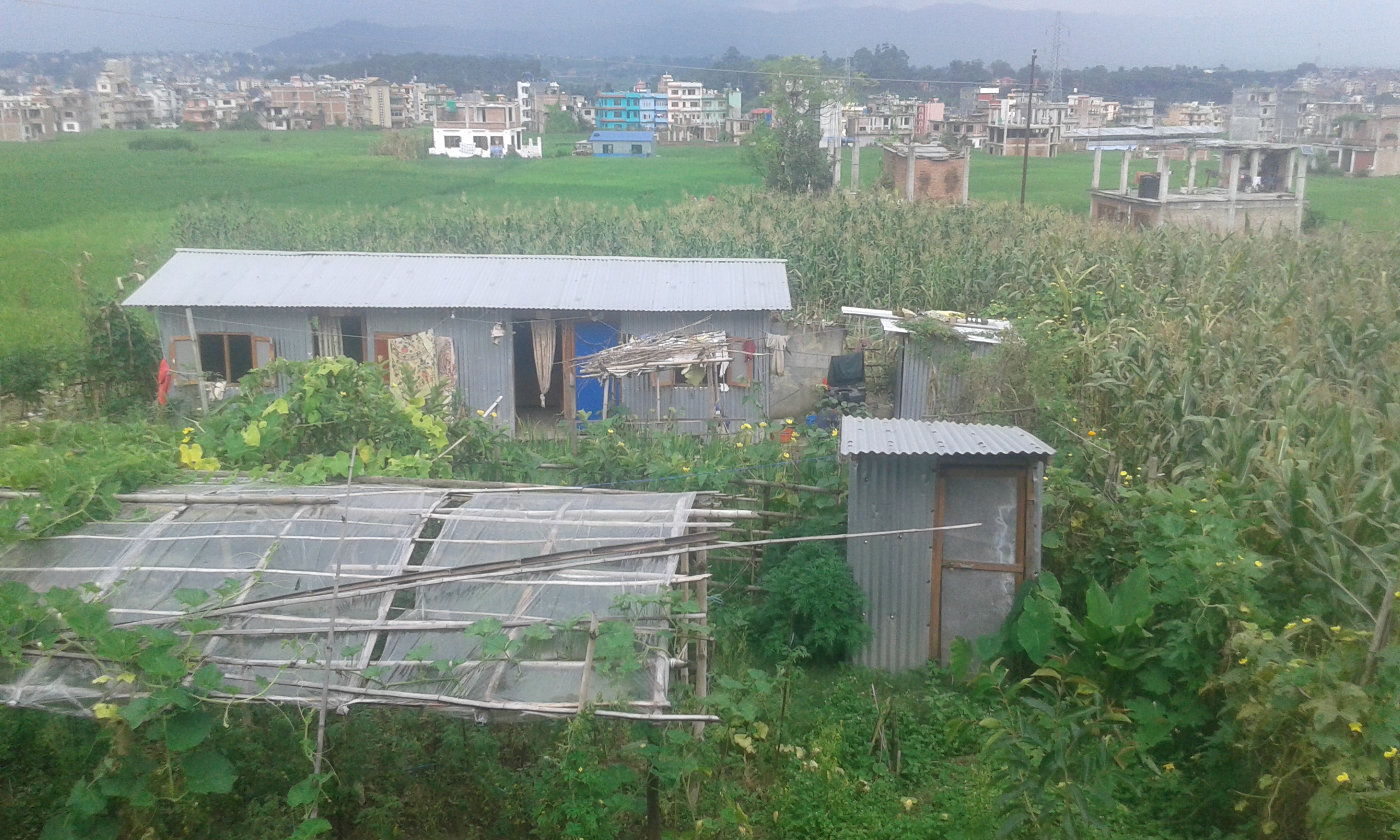
Katunje in 2016

Katunje is a village development committee in Okhaldhunga District in the Sagarmatha Zone of mid-eastern Nepal. At the time of the 1991 Nepal census, it had a population of 4027 living in 824 individual households.

One of the major weekly markets of Okhaldhunga, Kosh Haat lies in Katunje VDC. Presently Katunje lies in Sunkoshi Rural Municipality within Okhaldhunga.
