= Kosh Bhanjyang =

Kosh Bhanjyang कोष भञ्ज्याङ
- Market settlement
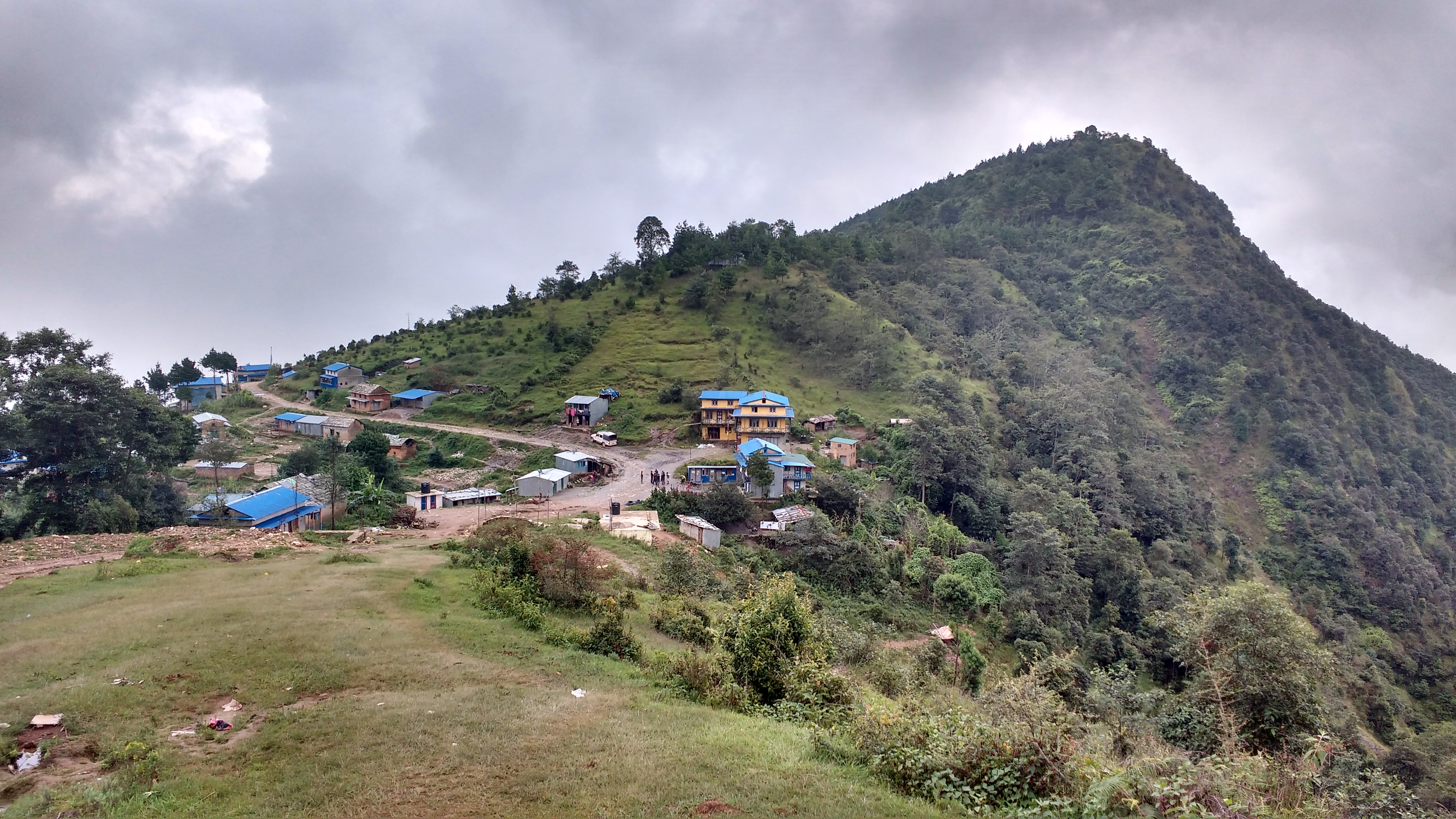
- Kosh Bhanjyang area viewed from west 2017

- Location in Nepal
- Coordinates: 27.307°N 86.378°E
- Country: Nepal
- Zone: Sagarmatha Zone
- District: Okhaldhunga District
- Time zone: UTC+5:45 (Nepal Time)

Kosh Bhanjyang (Nepali: कोष भञ्ज्याङ) is a market settlement located on a hilly pass between Katunje and Mulkharka of Okhaldhunga District. Under present local level structure it is located between Ward No 5 and 9 of Sunkoshi Rural Municipality, Okhaldhunga District.

== History ==
The settlement lies on the old foot trail to eastern Nepal from Kathmandu Valley passing from Kavre, crossing Roshi River, Nepalthok, Manthali, Ramechhap, Sanghutar, Ghodakhori all the way to Taplejung District. This trail was used by King Mahendra during his visit to eastern Nepal in 2013 B.S [1956 AD]. The area was not inhabited until that period.

There is a marker stone in the area which mentions the area to be exactly 38 kosh from Hanuman Dhoka. The name of the area derives from this marker stone. In 2017, the marker stone as displaced during road expansion. Besides the marker stone there used to be a public rest house called "Dhoke Pati".
