= Rumjatar Airport =

Airport in Nepal

Rumjatar Airport रुम्जाटार बिमानस्थल
- IATA: RUM; ICAO: VNRT

Summary
- Airport type: Public
- Owner: Government of Nepal
- Operator: Civil Aviation Authority of Nepal
- Serves: Rumjatar, Nepal
- Elevation AMSL: 4,500 ft / 1,372 m
- Coordinates: 27°18′13″N 86°33′02″E

Map
- Location of airport in Nepal

Runways
Direction	Length		Surface
Direction	m	ft	Surface
17/35	585	1,919	black topped

Rumjatar Airport (Nepali: रुम्जाटार बिमानस्थल, IATA: RUM, ICAO: VNRT) is a domestic airport located in Rumjatar serving Okhaldhunga District, a district in Koshi Province in Nepal.

== Facilities ==
The airport is at an elevation of 4,500 feet (1,372 m) above mean sea level. It has one runway which is 585 metres (1,919 ft) in length.

== Airlines and destinations ==
Airlines	Destinations
Nepal Airlines	Kathmandu
Tara Air	Kathmandu
