= Yasam, Nepal =

Coordinates: 27°23′N 86°18′E

Yasam, Nepal यासम
- Village development committee
- Interactive map of Yasam, Nepal
- Country: Nepal
- Province: Province No. 1
- District: Okhaldhunga District

Population (1991)
  - Total: 1,661
- Time zone: UTC+5:45 (Nepal Time)

Yasam, Nepal is a village development committee in Okhaldhunga District in the Province No. 1 of mid-eastern Nepal. At the time of the 1991 Nepal census it had a population of 1661 living in 330 individual households.
