= Jantarkhani =

Former Village Development Committee in Nepal

Jantarkhani जन्तरखानी
- Village development committee
- Location in Nepal
- Coordinates: 27.41°N 86.48°E
- Country: Nepal
- Zone: Sagarmatha Zone
- District: Okhaldhunga District

Population (2080)
  - Total: 2,300
- Time zone: UTC+5:45 (Nepal Time)

Jantarkhani is a former village development committee present ward number 6 siddhicharan urban municipality in Okhaldhunga District in the Sagarmatha Zone of mid-eastern Nepal. At the time of the 2078 Nepal census it had a population of 2022 living in 450 individual households. At the time of the 2078 Nepal census, Jantarkhani had a population of 2300, Ethnicity/caste: Bishwokarma, Sherpa, Newar, Magar.
