= Siddhicharan Shrestha =

Nepalese poet

Yugkavi Siddhicharan Shrestha
- सिद्धिचरण श्रेष्ठ
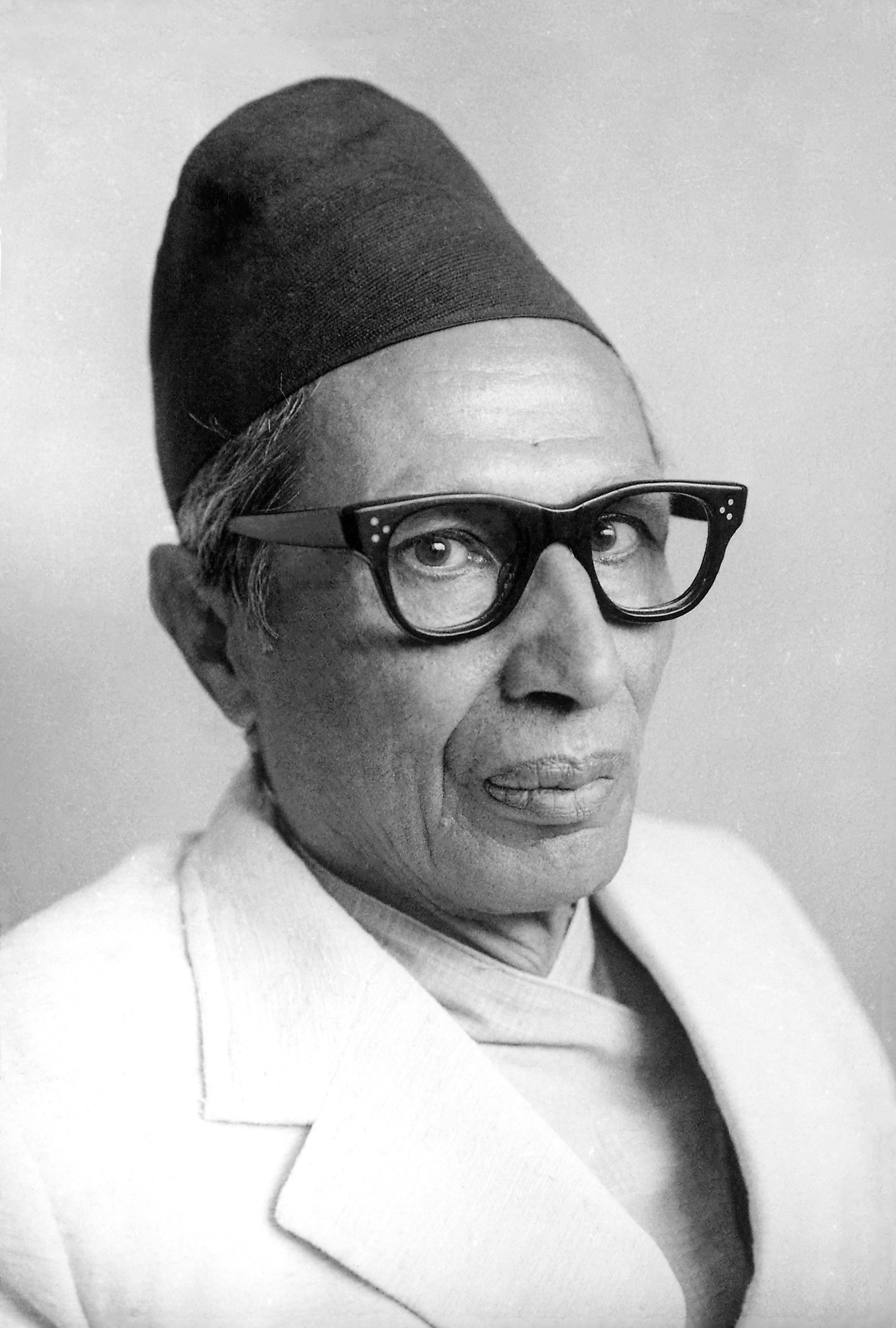
- Born: 21 May 1912; Siddhicharan Municipality, Okhaldhunga
- Died: 4 June 1992 (aged 80); Kathmandu
- Occupation: Poet
- Parents: Bishnu Charan Shrestha (father); Neer Kumari Shrestha (mother)

Siddhicharan Shrestha (Devanagari: सिद्धिचरण श्रेष्ठ; 21 May 1912 – 4 June 1992) was one of the most prominent writers of Nepal. He contributed to the struggle against the autocratic Rana regime (1846–1951) through his writings. His revolutionary poetry aroused freedom fighters, and he was sentenced to 18 years in jail for his literary activities. He wrote in Nepal Bhasa and Nepali.

His poem Mero Pyaro Okhaldhunga (Nepali: मेराे प्याराे ओखलढुङ्गा, lit. 'My Beloved Okhaldhunga') in Nepali is considered to be one of his masterpieces. In this poem, he has expressed how proud he is to describe the place Okhaldhunga in eastern Nepal, where he was born and grew up.

== Early years ==
Shrestha's ancestors moved to Ombahal of Kathmandu from Bhaktapur. His father Bishnu Charan (novelist) worked for the government and wrote novels like Sumati and Bhismapratigya. In the course of his service, he was transferred to Okhaldhunga in east Nepal where he was born on 21 May 1912 (9 Jestha 1969 B.S.) and spent his childhood. His mother was Neer Kumari Shrestha. In 1919 A.D when he was seven years old, the family returned to Kathmandu.

He studied at Durbar High School. One day in 1926, he observed an old man bent over his writing at a herbal shop at Kamalachhi near his school. The old man was renowned Nepal Bhasa poet Siddhi Das Amatya. Shrestha eventually considered Amatya as his guru.

== In jail ==
In 1940, Shrestha was accused of sedition by the Rana regime and sentenced to 18 years in prison for a poem he had written in Nepal Bhasa. It contained the line "Without revolution, there can be no proper peace".

Many poets, besides political activists, had been rounded up along with Shrestha. And his fellow inmates in jail included writers Chittadhar Hridaya, Phatte Bahadur Singh and Dharma Ratna Yami and artist Chandra Man Singh Maskey. The confinement of writers resulted in a creative outpouring, with many of them, including Shrestha, producing epics.

Shrestha's father died while he was in prison, but he was not permitted to perform the last rites. The grief drove him to compose poetry filled with anguish. He was released in 1945.

== Journalism ==
He also worked as a journalist. He was the editor of Nepal's first daily newspaper Awaj which was launched on 19 February 1951, a day after the Ranas were overthrown in a revolution. He was also associated with Sharada, a literary journal, and the Gorkhapatra, which was then a bi-weekly newspaper.

== Honors ==
In 1993, Nepal's Postal Services Department issued a commemorative postage stamp bearing a portrait of Shrestha to honor his contribution to Nepalese literature. A highway in eastern Nepal that leads to Okhaldhunga has been named Siddhicharan Highway. The place where he was born was also renamed as Siddhicharan municipality by Nepal Government.

== See also ==
- Lekhnath Paudyal
- Laxmi Prasad Devkota
- Bhupi Sherchan
