= Pokli =

Pokli पोकली Poki
- Village development committee
- Location in Nepal
- Coordinates: 27°26′N 86°17′E
- Country: Nepal
- Zone: Sagarmatha Zone
- District: Okhaldhunga District

Population (1991)
  - Total: 2,610
- Time zone: UTC+5:45 (Nepal Time)

Pokli is a village development committee in Okhaldhunga District in the Sagarmatha Zone of mid-eastern Nepal. At the time of the 1991 Nepal census it had a population of 2610 living in 529 individual households.
