= Taluwa =

Taluwa तलुवा
- Village development committee
- Location in Nepal
- Coordinates: 27.24°N 86.59°E
- Country: Nepal
- Zone: Sagarmatha Zone
- District: Okhaldhunga District

Population (1991)
  - Total: 2,067
- Time zone: UTC+5:45 (Nepal Time)

Taluwa is a village development committee in Okhaldhunga District in the Sagarmatha Zone of mid-eastern Nepal. At the time of the 1991 Nepal census, it had a population of 2067 living in 371 individual households.
