= Ratmata =

Ratmata रातमाटा
- Village development committee
- Location in Nepal
- Coordinates: 27.32°N 86.60°E
- Country: Nepal
- Zone: Sagarmatha Zone
- District: Okhaldhunga District

Population (1991)
  - Total: 2,507
- Time zone: UTC+5:45 (Nepal Time)

Ratmata is a village development committee in Okhaldhunga District in the Sagarmatha Zone of mid-eastern Nepal. At the time of the 1991 Nepal census it had a population of 2507 living in 450 individual households.
