= Pokhare =

Pokhare पोखरे
- Village development committee
- Location in Nepal
- Coordinates: 27.31°N 86.66°E
- Country: Nepal
- Zone: Sagarmatha Zone
- District: Okhaldhunga District

Population (1991)
  - Total: 1,790
- Time zone: UTC+5:45 (Nepal Time)

Pokhare is a village development committee in Okhaldhunga District in the Sagarmatha Zone of mid-eastern Nepal. At the time of the 1991 Nepal census it had a population of 1790 living in 348 individual households. It is incorporated within Chishankhugadhi Gaupalika.
