= Rajadip =

Coordinates: 27°22′N 86°27′E

Rangadip राँगादीप
- Village development committee
- Interactive map of Rangadip
- Country: Nepal
- Zone: Sagarmatha Zone
- District: Okhaldhunga District

Population (1991)
  - Total: 1,784
- Time zone: UTC+5:45 (Nepal Time)

Rajadip is a village development committee in Okhaldhunga District in the Sagarmatha Zone of mid-eastern Nepal. At the time of the 1991 Nepal census it had a population of 1784 living in 370 individual households.
