= Sisneri =

Coordinates: 27°14′N 86°23′E

Sisneri सिस्नेरी
- Village development committee
- Interactive map of Sisneri
- Country: Nepal
- Zone: Sagarmatha Zone
- District: Okhaldhunga District

Population (1991)
  - Total: 3,542
- Time zone: UTC+5:45 (Nepal Time)

Sisneri is a village development committee in Okhaldhunga District in the Sagarmatha Zone of mid-eastern Nepal. At the time of the 1991 Nepal census it had a population of 3542 living in 636 individual households.
