= Salleri, Okhaldhunga =

Salleri, Okhaldhunga सल्लेरी
- Village Development Committee
- Country: Nepal
- Zone: Sagarmatha Zone
- District: Okhaldhunga District

Population (1991)
  - Total: 1,621
- Time zone: UTC+5:45 (Nepal Time)

Salleri, Okhaldhunga is a Village Development Committee in Okhaldhunga District in the Sagarmatha Zone of mid-eastern Nepal. At the time of the 1991 Nepal census it had a population of 1621 residing in 321 individual households.
