= Thakle =

Thakle थाक्ले
- Manebhanjyang Rural Municipality, ward No.6)
- Location in Nepal
- Coordinates: 27.17°N 86.45°E
- Country: Nepal
- Zone: Sagarmatha Zone
- District: Okhaldhunga District

Population (1991)
  - Total: 2,336
- Time zone: UTC+5:45 (Nepal Time)

Thakle is a village development committee in Udaypur district in the Sagarmatha Zone of mid-eastern Nepal. At the time of the 1991 Nepal census it had a population of 2336 living in 390 individual households.
