= Ubu, Nepal =

Coordinates: 27.21°N 86.49°E

Ubu, Nepal उँबु
- Village Development Committee
- Interactive map of Ubu, Nepal
- Country: Nepal
- Province: Province No. 1
- District: Okhaldhunga District
- Rural Municipality: Manebhanjyang RM

Population (1991)
  - Total: 3,075
- Time zone: UTC+5:45 (Nepal Time)

Ubu, Nepal is a Village Development Committee in Okhaldhunga District in the Province No. 1 of mid-eastern Nepal. At the time of the 1991 Nepal census it had a population of 3075 residing in 604 individual households.
