= Palapu =

Palapu पलापु चम्पादेवी गाउँपालिका वडा नं १ र २
- Village development committee
- Location in Nepal
- Coordinates: 27.27°N 86.26°E
- Country: Nepal
- Zone: Sagarmatha Zone
- District: Okhaldhunga District

Population (1991)
  - Total: 3,830
- Time zone: UTC+5:45 (Nepal Time)

Palapu was a village development committee in Okhaldhunga District in the Sagarmatha Zone of mid-eastern Nepal. Now it belongs to Koshi province, okhaldhunga district, Champadevi rural municipality as per the federal governing system of Nepal. It has been divided into two wards 1 and 2. In contemporary time palapu VDC (Village Development Committee) had 9 wards.

== Demographics ==
At the time of the 1991 Nepal census, it had a population of 3,830 living in 625 individual households. According to the census of 2,078, BS It holds the population of 4,608 people in which ward no 1 has population of 2,163 people and ward no 2 has population of 2,445 people Which makes ward no 2 as a highest populated ward of Champadevi rural municipality. Palapu is the major habitat of Magar tribe. Except, there is Sunuwar, Newar, Kami, Damai, Bahun, etc.
