= Balakhu =

Former Village Development Committee in Nepal

Balakhu बलखु
- Village development committee
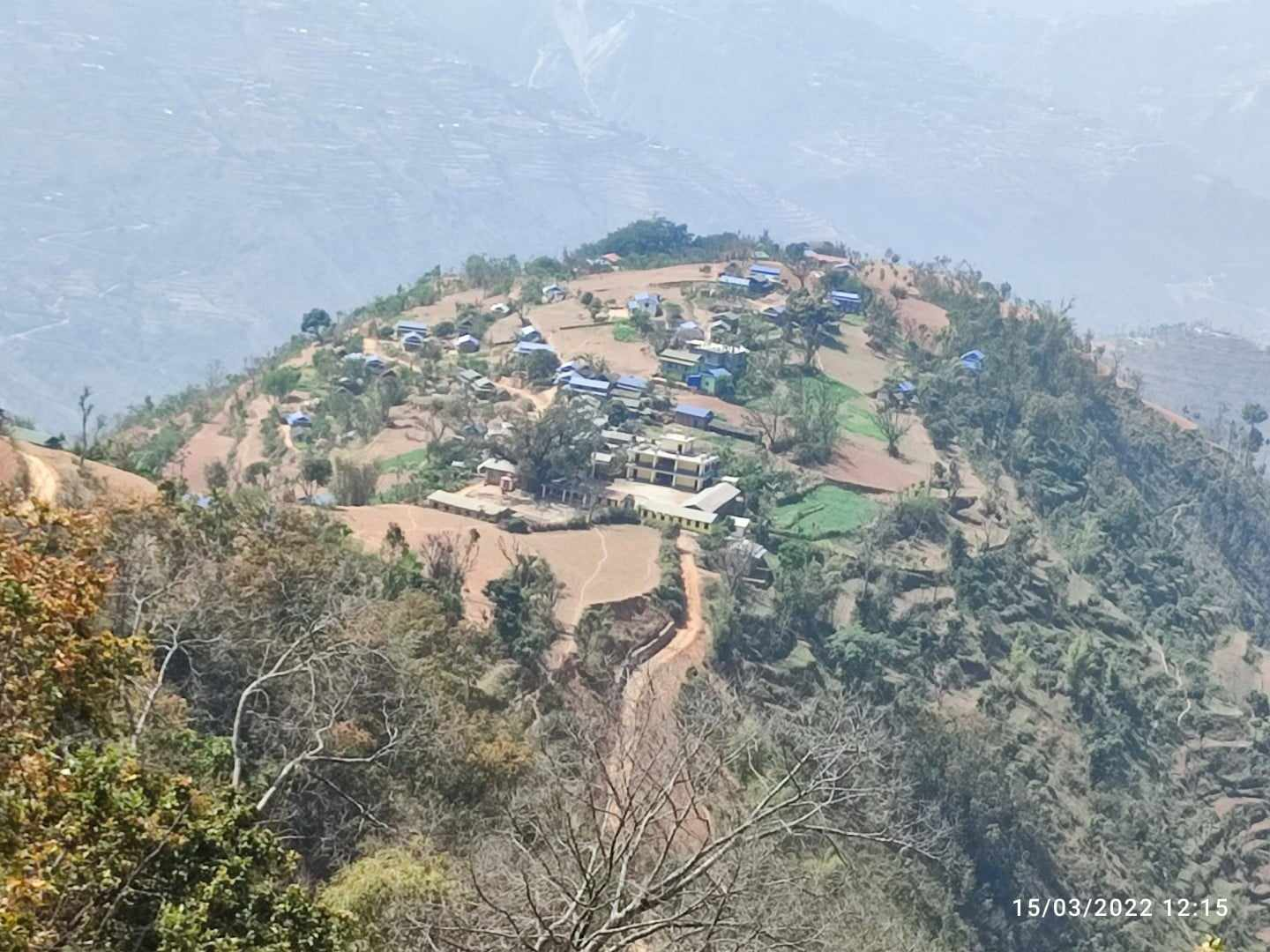

- Location in Nepal
- Coordinates: 27.25°N 86.32°E
- Country: Nepal
- Zone: Sagarmatha Zone
- District: Okhaldhunga District

Population (1991)
  - Total: 3,703
- Time zone: UTC+5:45 (Nepal Time)

Balakhu is a village development committee in Okhaldhunga District in the Sagarmatha Zone of mid-eastern Nepal. Balakhu Village is located on the bank of Sunkoshi river at the south western part of Okhaldhunga District.At the time of the 1991 Nepal census it had a population of 3703 living in 677 individual households. Simalchaur
