= Raniban, Dailekh =

Coordinates: 28°57′N 81°42′E

Raniban रानीबन
- Village development committee
- Interactive map of Raniban
- Country: Nepal
- Province: Karnali Province
- District: Dailekh District

Population (1991)
  - Total: 3,495
- Time zone: UTC+5:45 (Nepal Time)

Raniban is a village development committee in Dailekh District in Karnali Province of western-central Nepal. At the time of the 1991 Nepal census it had a population of 3495 people living in 561 individual households.
