= Chyanam =

Former Village Development Committee in Nepal

Chyanam च्यानम
- Village development committee
- Location in Nepal
- Coordinates: 27.29°N 86.42°E
- Country: Nepal
- Zone: Sagarmatha Zone
- District: Okhaldhunga District

Population (1991)
  - Total: 3,000
- Time zone: UTC+5:45 (Nepal Time)
- Postal code: 56109
- Area code: 037

Chyanam is a village development committee in Okhaldhunga District in the Sagarmatha Zone of mid-eastern Nepal. At the time of the 1991 Nepal census it had a population of 3000 living in 585 individual households.
