= Mulkharka =

Former Village Development Committee in Nepal

Mulkharka मूलखर्क
- Village development committee
- Location in Nepal
- Coordinates: 27.27°N 86.39°E
- Country: Nepal
- Zone: Sagarmatha Zone
- District: Okhaldhunga District

Population (1991)
  - Total: 3,719
- Time zone: UTC+5:45 (Nepal Time)

Mulkharka is a village development committee in Okhaldhunga District in the Sagarmatha Zone of mid-eastern Nepal. At the time of the 1991 Nepal census it had a population of 3719 living in 596 individual households.

== Etymology ==
The name of the village development committee, Mulkharka, comes from the two local words, 'mul' meaning main and 'kharka' meaning a pasture.

== Description ==
This village development committee lies in the hills of Okhaldhunga District. It has a dense forest of many useful trees, herbs and shrubs. The concept of community forest has been introduced for a decade. Wild animals and birds such as deer, tiger, porcupine, rabbit, and peacock. can be easily found in the forests. Tamang community has a majority population in the VDC while Magar community also has a small settlement.

== Economy ==
The majority of the population depend on agriculture. Crops such as wheat, potatoes, and rice are grown. Most of the youth, especially the male ones, have been to foreign countries like Malaysia, the United Arab Emirates, Saudi Arabia, Oman, etc. for their employment. A few people are engaged in teaching, shop-keeping, driving, and as soldiers in the Indian Army Gurkha Rifles.
