= Pokali =

Pokali is a village development committee (VDC) of Okhaldhunga District, Nepal. It is the second largest VDC of Okhaldhunga, and is located at the border of Ramechhap District.

The village is home to Pokali waterfall (130 metres (430 ft) in height), and nine wards with a different culture in every ward. In Pokali a school was established at 2002Bs by Ambika PD Ghimire: the school's name is Shree Leti Ma.vi.(ma.vi.being the Nepali abbreviation for secondary school) Leti Pokali.
