= Prapcha =

Coordinates: 27°22′N 86°26′E

Prapcha प्राप्चा
- Village development committee
- Interactive map of Prapcha
- Country: Nepal
- Zone: Sagarmatha Zone
- District: Okhaldhunga District

Population (1991)
  - Total: 1,259
- Time zone: UTC+5:45 (Nepal Time)

Prapcha is a village development committee in Okhaldhunga District in the Sagarmatha Zone of mid-eastern Nepal. At the time of the 1991 Nepal census it had a population of 1259 living in 249 individual households.
