= Baksa, Nepal =

Former Village Development Committee in Nepal

Waksa, Nepal वाक्सा
- Village development committee
- Location in Nepal
- Coordinates: 27.22°N 86.52°E
- Country: Nepal
- Zone: Sagarmatha Zone
- District: Okhaldhunga District

Population (1991)
  - Total: 2,467
- Time zone: UTC+5:45 (Nepal Time)

VDC Map of Okhaldhunga District

Waksa, Nepal is a village development committee in Okhaldhunga District in the Sagarmatha Zone of mid-eastern Nepal. At the time of the 1991 Nepal census it had a population of 2467 living in 462 individual households.
