= Kalikadevi =

Former Village Development Committee in Nepal

Kalikadevi कालिकादेवी
- Village development committee
- Location in Nepal
- Coordinates: 27.30°N 86.28°E
- Country: Nepal
- Zone: Sagarmatha Zone
- District: Okhaldhunga District

Population (1991)
  - Total: 1,811
- Time zone: UTC+5:45 (Nepal Time)

Kalikadevi is a village development committee in Okhaldhunga District in the Sagarmatha Zone of mid-eastern Nepal. At the time of the 1991 Nepal census it had a population of 1811 living in 326 individual households.
