= Salleri, Panchthar =

Salleri सल्लेरी गाविस
- Village development committee
- Country: Nepal
- Province: Province No. 1
- District: Panchthar District

Population (1990)
  - Total: 2,654
- Time zone: UTC+5:45 (Nepal Time)

Salleri is a village development committee in Panchthar District in the Province No. 1 of eastern Nepal. At the time of the 1991 Nepal census it had a population of 2654 people living in 470 individual households.
