= Kuibhir =

Former Village Development Committee in Nepal

Kuibhir Chusku कुइभीर चुस्कु
- Village development committee
- Location in Nepal
- Coordinates: 27.33°N 86.66°E
- Country: Nepal
- Zone: Sagarmatha Zone
- District: Okhaldhunga District

Population (1991)
  - Total: 2,121
- Time zone: UTC+5:45 (Nepal Time)

Kuibhir Chasku is a village development committee in Okhaldhunga District in the Sagarmatha Zone of mid-eastern Nepal. At the time of the 1991 Nepal census it had a population of 2121 living in 419 individual households.
