= Ragani =

Ragani रगनी
- Village development committee
- Location in Nepal
- Coordinates: 27.43°N 86.31°E
- Country: Nepal
- Zone: Sagarmatha Zone
- District: Okhaldhunga District

Population (1991)
  - Total: 3,542
- Time zone: UTC+5:45 (Nepal Time)
- Postal code: 56112
- Area code: 037

Ragani is a village development committee in Okhaldhunga District in the Sagarmatha Zone of mid-eastern Nepal. At the time of the 1991 Nepal census it had a population of 3542 living in 678 individual households.
