= Kuntadevi =

Former Village Development Committee in Nepal

Kuntadevi कुन्तादेवी
- Village development committee
- Location in Nepal
- Coordinates: 27.32°N 86.46°E
- Country: Nepal
- Zone: Sagarmatha Zone
- District: Okhaldhunga District

Population (1991)
  - Total: 2,259
- Time zone: UTC+5:45 (Nepal Time)

Kuntadevi is a village development committee in Okhaldhunga District in the Sagarmatha Zone of mid-eastern Nepal. At the time of the 1991 Nepal census it had a population of 2259 living in 459 individual households.
