= Rawadolu =

Rawadolu रावादोलु
- Village development committee
- Location in Nepal
- Coordinates: 27.51°N 86.35°E
- Country: Nepal
- Zone: Sagarmatha Zone
- District: Okhaldhunga District

Population (1991)
  - Total: 1,637
- Time zone: UTC+5:45 (Nepal Time)

Rawadolu is a village development committee in Okhaldhunga District in the Sagarmatha Zone of mid-eastern Nepal. Rawadolu is a name made up of two words, Rawa and Dolu. In the Koinch Sunuwar language, Rawa means the ancestral home of the Rawachs, while Dolu means a large stone that catches the sun on a hill. At the time of the 1991 Nepal census it had a population of 1637 living in 429 individual households.
