= Gamnangtar =

Former Village Development Committee in Nepal

Gamnangtar गाम्नाङटार
- Location in Nepal
- Coordinates: 27.39°N 86.26°E
- Country: Nepal
- Zone: Sagarmatha
- District: Okhaldhunga
- Province: Koshi

Population (1991)
  - Total: 2,925
- Time zone: UTC+5:45 (Nepal Time)
- Postal code: 56107
- Area code: 037
- Website: koshi.gov.np

Gamnangtar is a village in Okhaldhunga District, located in the Koshi Province within the Sagarmatha Zone of mid-eastern Nepal. At the time of the 1991 Nepal census it had a population of 2925 living in 535 individual households.
