= Baraneshwar =

Former Village Development Committee in Nepal

Coordinates: 27°21′N 86°28′E

Baruneshwar बरुनेश्वर
- Village development committee
- Interactive map of Baruneshwar
- Country: Nepal
- Zone: Sagarmatha Zone
- District: Okhaldhunga District

Population (1991)
  - Total: 3,240
- Time zone: UTC+5:45 (Nepal Time)

Baruneshwar is a village development committee in Okhaldhunga District in the Sagarmatha Zone of mid-eastern Nepal. At the time of the 1991 Nepal census it had a population of 3240 living in 656 individual households.
