= Jyamire, Palpa =

Jyamire ज्यामिरे
- Village development committee
- Location in Nepal
- Coordinates: 27.75°N 83.81°E
- Country: Nepal
- Zone: Lumbini Zone
- District: Palpa District

Population (1991)
  - Total: 3,094
- Time zone: UTC+5:45 (Nepal Time)

Jyamire is a village development committee in Palpa District in the Lumbini Zone of southern Nepal. At the time of the 1991 Nepal census it had a population of 3094.
