= Tarkerabari =

Tarkerabari टारकेराबारी
- Village
- Location in Nepal
- Coordinates: 27.41°N 86.27°E
- Country: Nepal
- Zone: Sagarmatha Zone
- District: Okhaldhunga District

Population (1991)
  - Total: 1,968
- Time zone: UTC+5:45 (Nepal Time)

Tarkerabari is a village in Okhaldhunga District in the Sagarmatha Zone of mid-eastern Nepal. At the time of the 1991 Nepal census it had a population of 1968 living in 365 individual households.
