= Jyamire, Okhaldhunga =

Village in Nepal

Coordinates: 27°18′N 86°27′E

Jyamire, Okhaldhunga ज्यामिरे
- Interactive map of Jyamire, Okhaldhunga
- Country: Nepal
- Zone: Sagarmatha Zone
- District: Okhaldhunga District

Population (1991)
  - Total: 2,344
- Time zone: UTC+5:45 (Nepal Time)

Jyamire, Okhaldhunga is a market in Siddhicharan Municipality in Okhaldhunga District in the Sagarmatha Zone of mid-eastern Nepal. This village center was merged to the Municipality in May 2014. At the time of the 1991 Nepal census it had a population of 2344 residing in 422 individual households.
