= Raniban, Achham =

Raniban रानीबन
- Village development committee
- Location in Nepal
- Coordinates: 28.98°N 81.40°E
- Country: Nepal
- Zone: Seti Zone
- District: Achham District

Population (2001)
  - Total: 2,382
  - Religions: Hindu
- Time zone: UTC+5:45 (Nepal Time)

Raniban is a village in Achham District in the Seti Zone of western Nepal. At the time of the 1991 Nepal census, the village had a population of 2178 living in 429 houses. At the time of the 2001 Nepal census, the population was 2382, of which 28% was literate.
