= Thoksela =

Coordinates: 27°14′N 86°24′E

Thoksela ठोक्सिला
- Village development committee
- Interactive map of Thoksela
- Country: Nepal
- Zone: Sagarmatha Zone
- District: Okhaldhunga District

Population (1991)
  - Total: 2,128
- Time zone: UTC+5:45 (Nepal Time)

Thoksela is a village development committee in Okhaldhunga District in the Sagarmatha Zone of mid-eastern Nepal. At the time of the 1991 Nepal census it had a population of 2128 living in 651 individual households.
