= Bahing =

Nepalese ethnic group

The Bahing are a subset of the Indigenous Kirant ethnic group, which is located widely in Okhaldhunga and Solukhumbu District. These people have 6547 population (2021 census) They can be found in some of the villages like Bulaadi, Chisopani, Moli, Pankhu, Bhadaure, Aapsowra, Rangadeep, Bigutar, Mamkha, Narayasthan, Baruneshowe, Ratmate, Waksa, Lekh Kharka of the Okhaldhunga District, and Nechabatase, Titribot of Ophlang in khotang district, Salyan of Solukhumbu & in some other districts of eastern Nepal.

Their language, also named "Bahing lo, Pai lo, Radu lo, Wai lo, Procha Lo", belongs to the family of Kiranti languages, a subgroup of Tibeto-Burman. They use "Sewa" as their first greetings. They have two main festivals: Hong and Susu. The Bahing also worship Nature.

== Demographics ==
The Central Bureau of Statistics of Nepal classifies the Bahing as a subgroup within the broader social group of Mountain/Hill Janajati. At the time of the 2011 Nepal census, 3,096 people (0.0% of the population of Nepal) were Bahing. The frequency of Bahing people by province was as follows:

- Koshi Province (0.1%)
- Bagmati Province (0.0%)
- Madhesh Province (0.0%)
- Gandaki Province (0.0%)
- Karnali Province (0.0%)
- Lumbini Province (0.0%)
- Sudurpashchim Province (0.0%)

The frequency of Bahing people was higher than national average (0.0%) in the following districts:

- Okhaldhunga (1.5%)
- Solukhumbu (0.1%)
