= Raniban, Okhaldhunga =

Raniban, Sagarmatha रानीबन
- Village development committee
- Location in Nepal
- Coordinates: 27.35°N 86.27°E
- Country: Nepal
- Zone: Sagarmatha Zone
- District: Okhaldhunga District

Population (1991)
  - Total: 1,874
- Time zone: UTC+5:45 (Nepal Time)

Raniban, Sagarmatha is a village development committee in Okhaldhunga District in the Sagarmatha Zone of mid-eastern Nepal. At the time of the 1991 Nepal census it had a population of 1874 living in 372 individual households.
