= Patle =

ishanshu Patle पात्ले Anatram patle
- Village development committee
- Country: Nepal
- Zone: Sagarmatha Zone
- District: Ramechhap District

Population (1991)
  - Total: 3,109
- Time zone: UTC+5:45 (Nepal Time)

Patle is a Village Development Committee in Okhaldhunga District in the Sagarmatha Zone of mid-eastern Nepal. At the time of the 1991 Nepal census it had a population of 3109 living in 568 individual households.
