= Bhadaure, Okhaldhunga =

Former Village Development Committee in Nepal

Bhadaure भदौरे
- Village development committee
- Location in Nepal
- Coordinates: 27.27°N 86.62°E
- Country: Nepal
- Zone: Sagarmatha Zone
- District: Okhaldhunga District

Population (1991)
  - Total: 3,030.
- Time zone: UTC+5:45 (Nepal Time)

Bhadaure is a village development committee in Okhaldhunga District in the Sagarmatha Zone of mid-eastern Nepal. At the time of the 1991 Nepal census it had a population of 3030.
