= Okhaldhunga =

Headquarters of Okhaldhunga District, Nepal

Okhaldhunga ओखलढुङ्गा
- Merged to Siddhicharan Municipality
- Location in Nepal
- Coordinates: 27°19′N 86°30′E
- Country: Nepal
- Zone: Sagarmatha Zone
- District: Okhaldhunga District
- Elevation: 1,561 m (5,121 ft)

Population (1991)
  - Total: 3,761
- Time zone: UTC+5:45 (Nepal Time)
- Postal code: +977

Okhaldhunga (Nepali: ओखलढुङ्गा) is the headquarters of the Okhaldhunga District in the Sagarmatha Zone of Nepal. At the time of the 1991 Nepal census it had a population of 3761 living in 790 individual households.

== Climate ==
Climate data for Okhaldhunga, elevation 1,731 m (5,679 ft), (1991–2020 normals, extremes 1983–2017)
Month	Jan	Feb	Mar	Apr	May	Jun	Jul	Aug	Sep	Oct	Nov	Dec	Year
Record high °C (°F)	22.7 (72.9)	27.6 (81.7)	28.8 (83.8)	30.9 (87.6)	30.5 (86.9)	31.2 (88.2)	29.4 (84.9)	29.5 (85.1)	29.3 (84.7)	29.5 (85.1)	27.9 (82.2)	25.6 (78.1)	31.2 (88.2)
Mean daily maximum °C (°F)	15.8 (60.4)	18.1 (64.6)	21.8 (71.2)	24.6 (76.3)	25.2 (77.4)	25.4 (77.7)	24.9 (76.8)	25.1 (77.2)	24.6 (76.3)	23.6 (74.5)	20.8 (69.4)	17.4 (63.3)	22.3 (72.1)
Daily mean °C (°F)	10.6 (51.1)	12.6 (54.7)	16.2 (61.2)	19.1 (66.4)	20.3 (68.5)	21.3 (70.3)	21.3 (70.3)	21.4 (70.5)	20.6 (69.1)	18.7 (65.7)	15.4 (59.7)	12.1 (53.8)	17.5 (63.5)
Mean daily minimum °C (°F)	5.3 (41.5)	7.1 (44.8)	10.5 (50.9)	13.6 (56.5)	15.3 (59.5)	17.2 (63.0)	17.7 (63.9)	17.6 (63.7)	16.6 (61.9)	13.7 (56.7)	10.0 (50.0)	6.7 (44.1)	12.6 (54.7)
Record low °C (°F)	−1.5 (29.3)	0.2 (32.4)	2.7 (36.9)	4.4 (39.9)	6.5 (43.7)	11.3 (52.3)	14.0 (57.2)	10.9 (51.6)	10.2 (50.4)	7.5 (45.5)	3.0 (37.4)	0.6 (33.1)	−1.5 (29.3)
Average precipitation mm (inches)	12.0 (0.47)	14.9 (0.59)	25.8 (1.02)	66.5 (2.62)	153.0 (6.02)	292.9 (11.53)	417.8 (16.45)	416.0 (16.38)	265.0 (10.43)	61.2 (2.41)	8.0 (0.31)	8.2 (0.32)	1,741.3 (68.56)
Average precipitation days (≥ 1.0 mm)	1.6	2.2	3.9	7.9	14.0	18.4	22.2	21.4	16.3	5.4	1.0	0.8	115.1
Source 1: World Meteorological Organization
Source 2: Department of Hydrology and Meteorology

== Media ==
To promote local culture Okhaldhunga has two FM radio stations: Radio Likhu (91.3 MHz) and Ramailo Samudayek Radio (100.6 MHz), both of which are community radio stations.

== Gallery ==
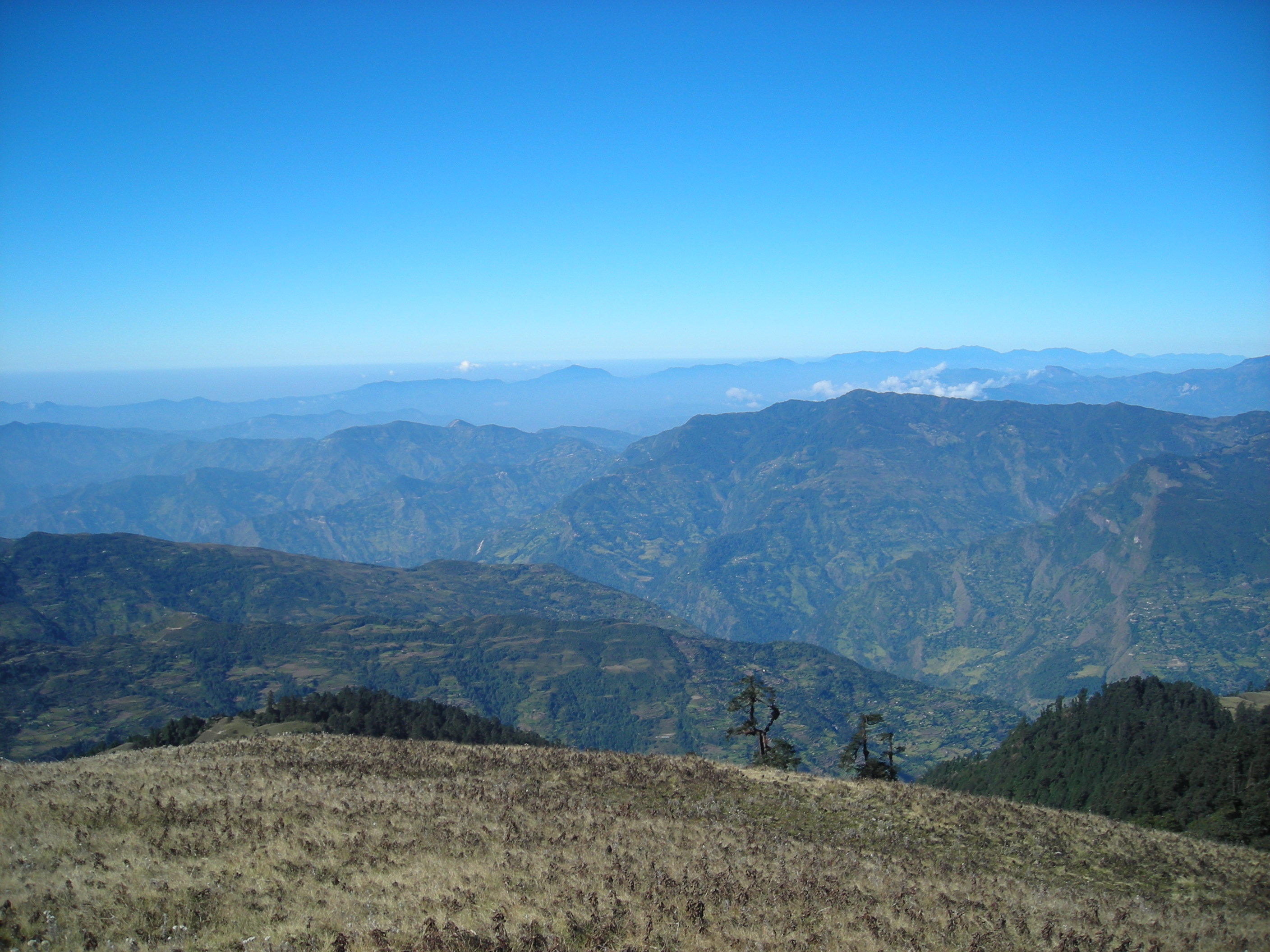
tholedema khijeeview

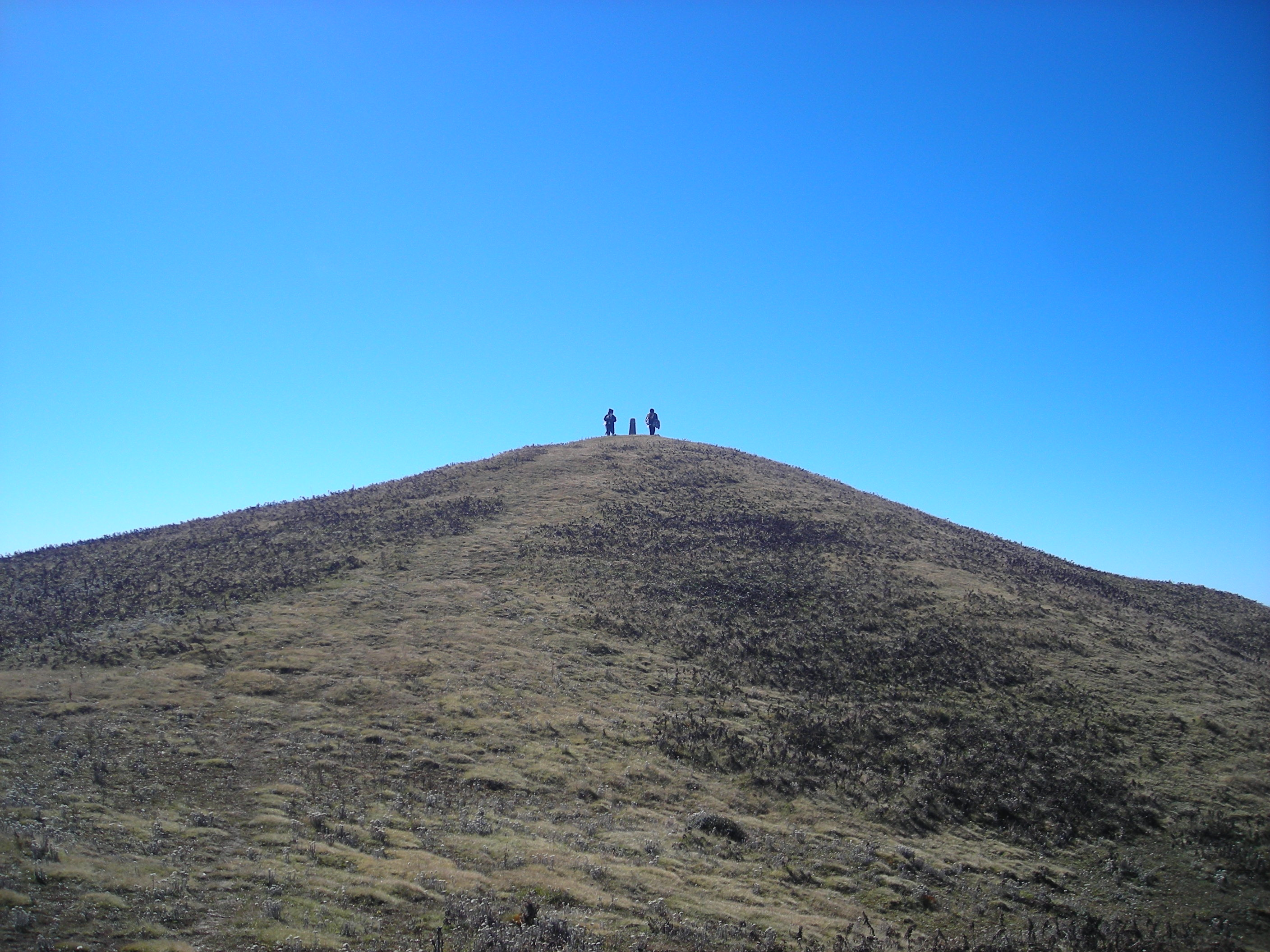
toledema

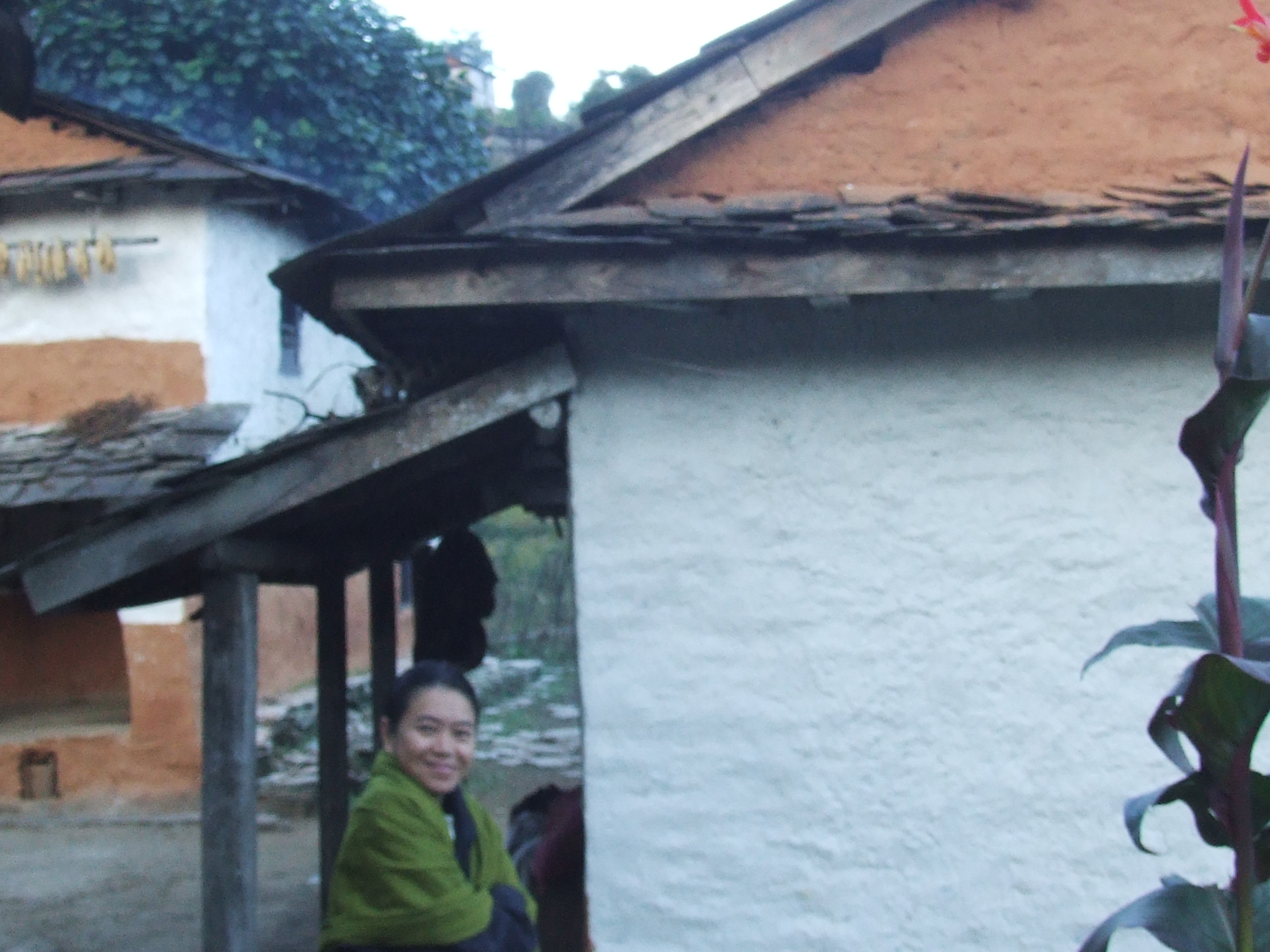
Gaungtol

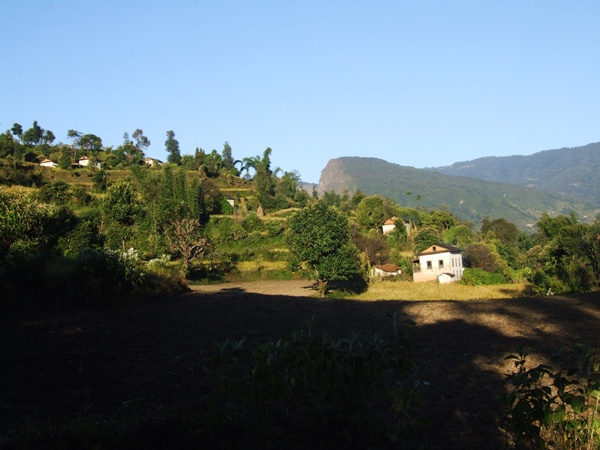
dandakhi

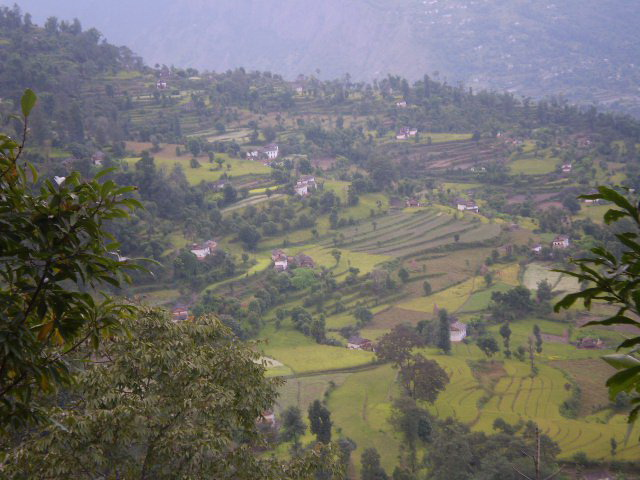
KhijiV

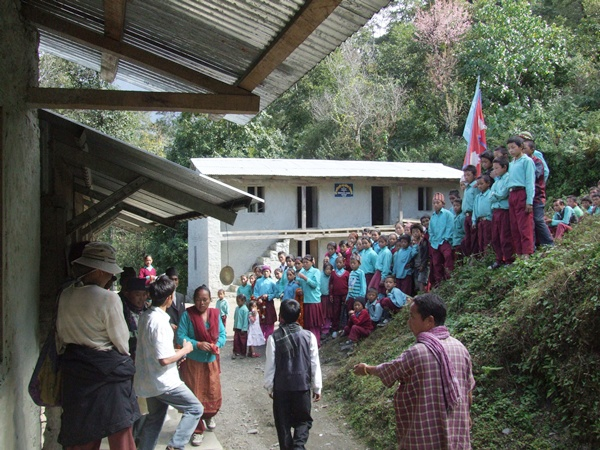
KhijiDVC2

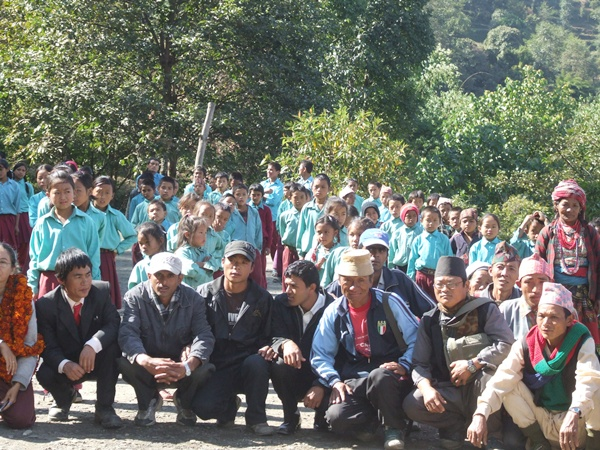
Khijee3

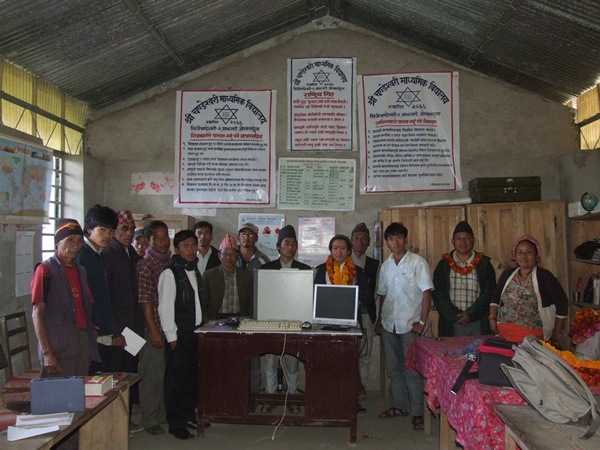
Khiji4

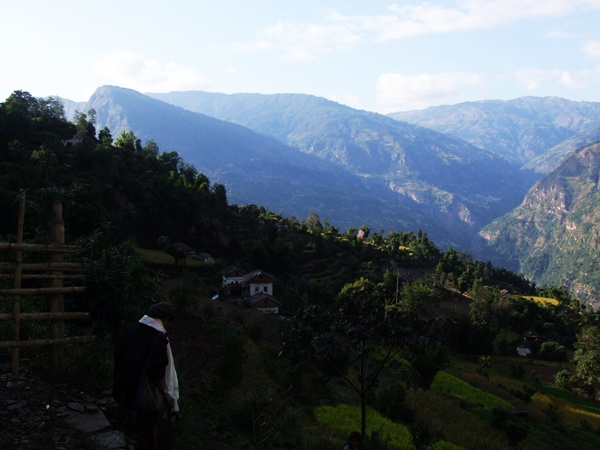
satatol

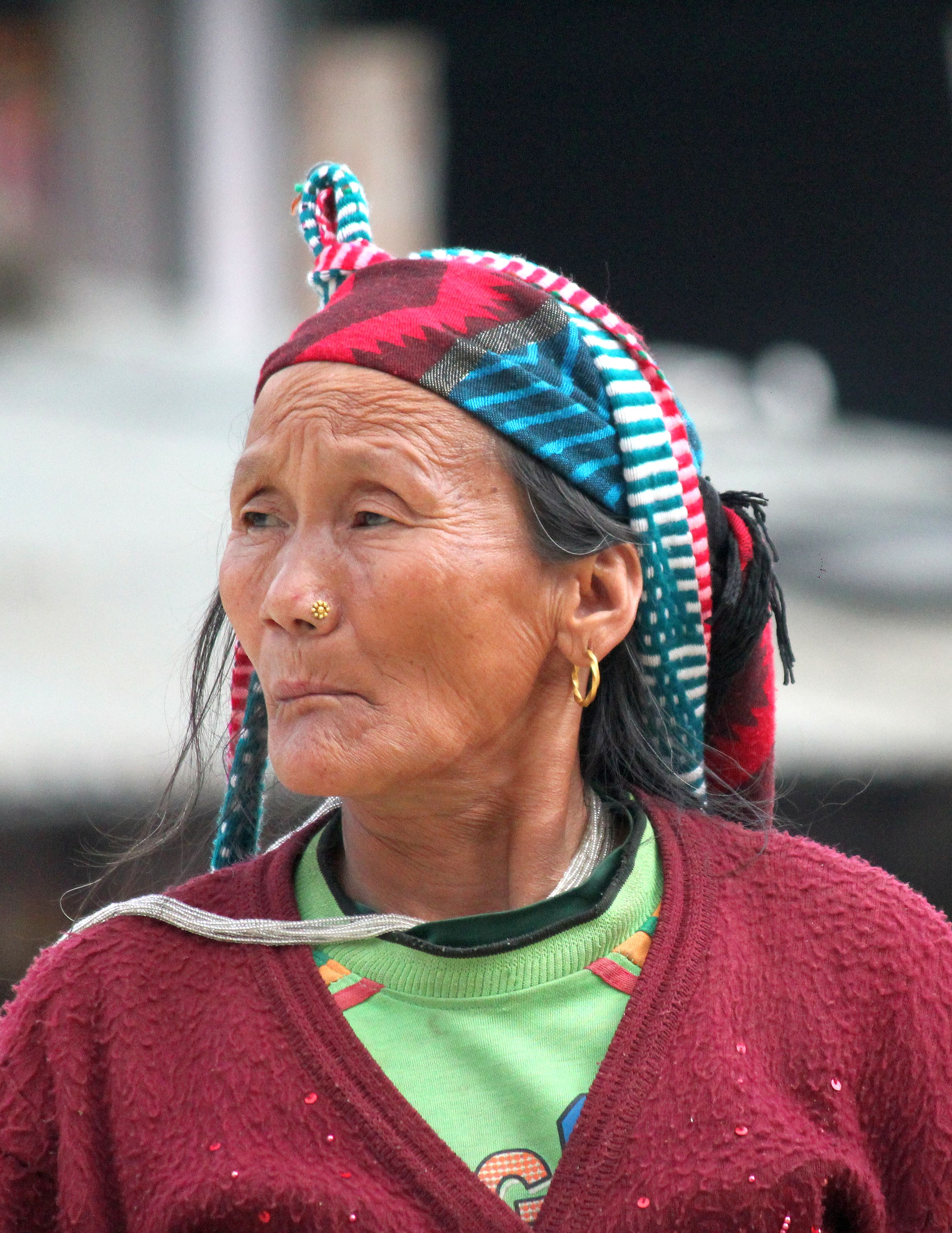
Portrait of a woman at Okhaldunga

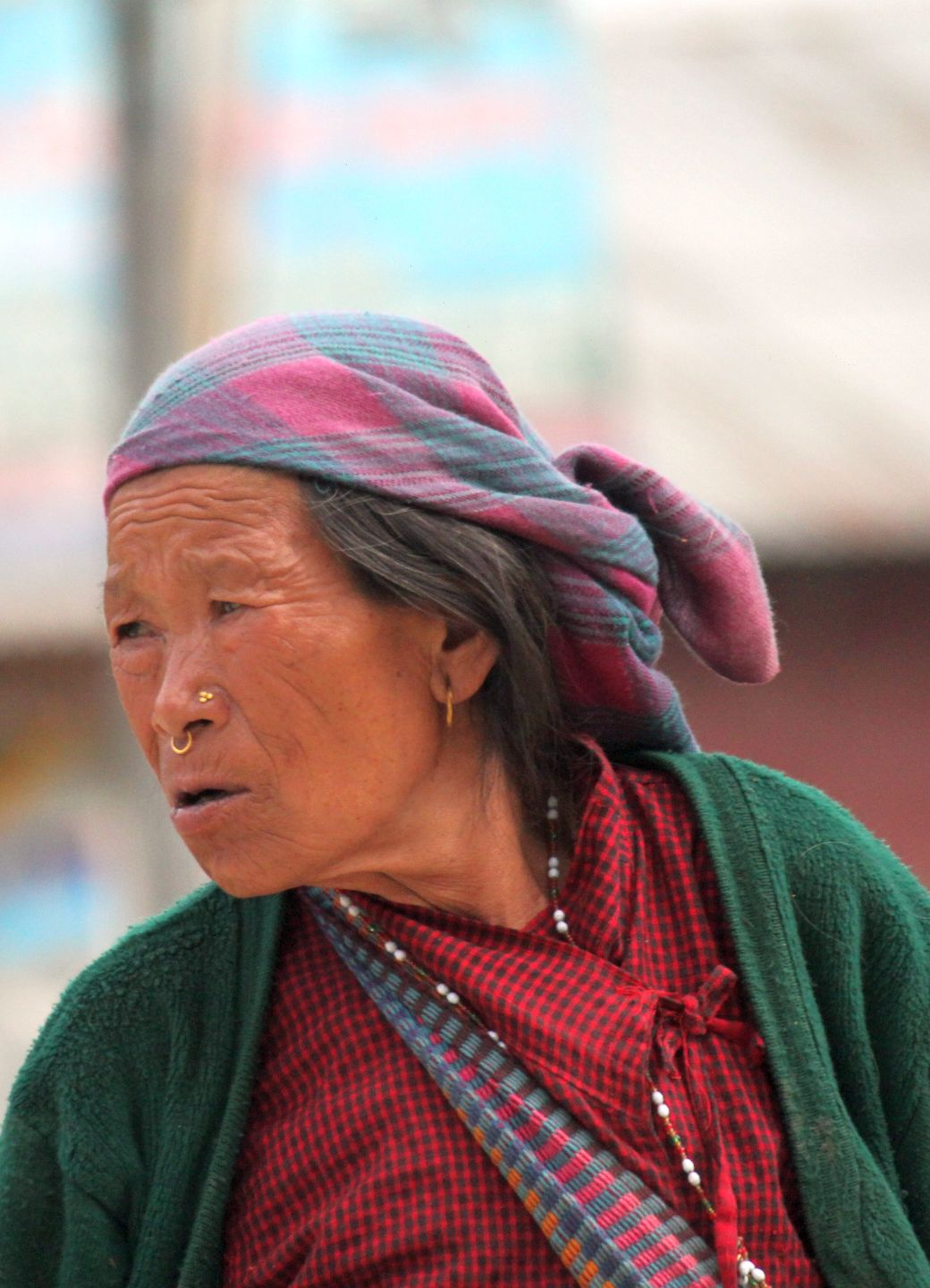
Portrait of a woman at Okhaldunga
