= Khijiphalate =

Former Village Development Committee in Nepal

Khiji Phalate खिजि फलाटे
- Village development committee
- Location in Nepal
- Coordinates: 27.43°N 86.37°E
- Country: Nepal
- Zone: Sagarmatha Zone
- District: Okhaldhunga District

Population (1991)
  - Total: 2,944
- Time zone: UTC+5:45 (Nepal Time)

Khiji Phalate is a part of Khiji Chandeshwari it has village development committee in Okhaldhunga District in the Sagarmatha Zone of mid-eastern Nepal. At the time of the 1991 Nepal census it had a population of 2944 living in 459 individual households.
