= Moli, Nepal =

Former village development committee in Nepal

Moli मोली
- Village development committee
- Location in Nepal
- Coordinates: 27.24°N 86.55°E
- Country: Nepal
- Zone: Sagarmatha Zone
- District: Okhaldhunga District

Population (1991)
  - Total: 3,447
- Time zone: UTC+5:45 (Nepal Time)
- Postal code: 56111
- Area code: 037

Moli is a village development committee in Okhaldhunga District in the Sagarmatha Zone of mid-eastern Nepal. At the time of the 1991 Nepal census it had a population of 3447 living in 597 individual households.
