= Ratmate =

Ratmate रातमाटे Ward number 7, Belkotgadhi
- ward number 7
- Location in Nepal
- Coordinates: 27.85°N 85.06°E
- Country: Nepal
- Zone: Bagmati province
- District: Nuwakot District

Government

Population
  - Total: estimated as more than 4 thousands
- Time zone: UTC+5:45 (Nepal Time)

Ratmate is Ward No. 7 of Belkotgadhi Municipality in Nuwakot District of central Nepal. Formerly a Village Development Committee (VDC). According to the 2021 Nepal Census, the ward has a total population of 4,547 people, including 2,262 males and 2,285 females.

Ratmate is a culturally diverse ward with major communities including Brahmins, Chhetris, Tamangs, Rais, Newars, Magars, Nepalis, and Bishwakarmas. The ward lies at an elevation of approximately 495 metres above sea level and is located at coordinates 27°51′8.05″N 85°3′35.50″E.

The holy Trishuli River flows along the area and separates Ratmate from Tarkeshwar Municipality. Ratmate is bordered by Jilling in the east, separated by Thulo Khola; Kolputar in the west, separated by Jagaram Khola; and Duipipal in the south.

Mahadevphant is the main commercial and settlement area of the entire Belkotgadhi Municipality. The prestigious Galchhi–Kerung Highway, also known as the China Road, passes through Ratmate and plays an important role in transportation and trade.

Major religious sites in the ward include Bhimeshwar Mahadev Temple, Ananteshwar Mahadev Temple, and Shiladevi Temple. Major festivals celebrated in the area include Dashain, Tihar, Maghi, and Sonam Lhosar.

Mahadev Secondary School is regarded as one of the oldest and most prestigious schools in the district. Shiladevi Secondary School is another educational institution located in the ward.

Agriculture is the primary source of income for most residents. Major agricultural products include rice, wheat, maize, millet, and seasonal vegetables. Poultry farming is also an important occupation. In addition, some residents are engaged in government service, private sector employment, and business activities.

Following the local elections held in 2079 B.S., Bhubaneshwor Nepal was elected as the ward president with 835 votes. Villages and settlements within the ward include Mahadevphant, Ratmate, and Chandretar.

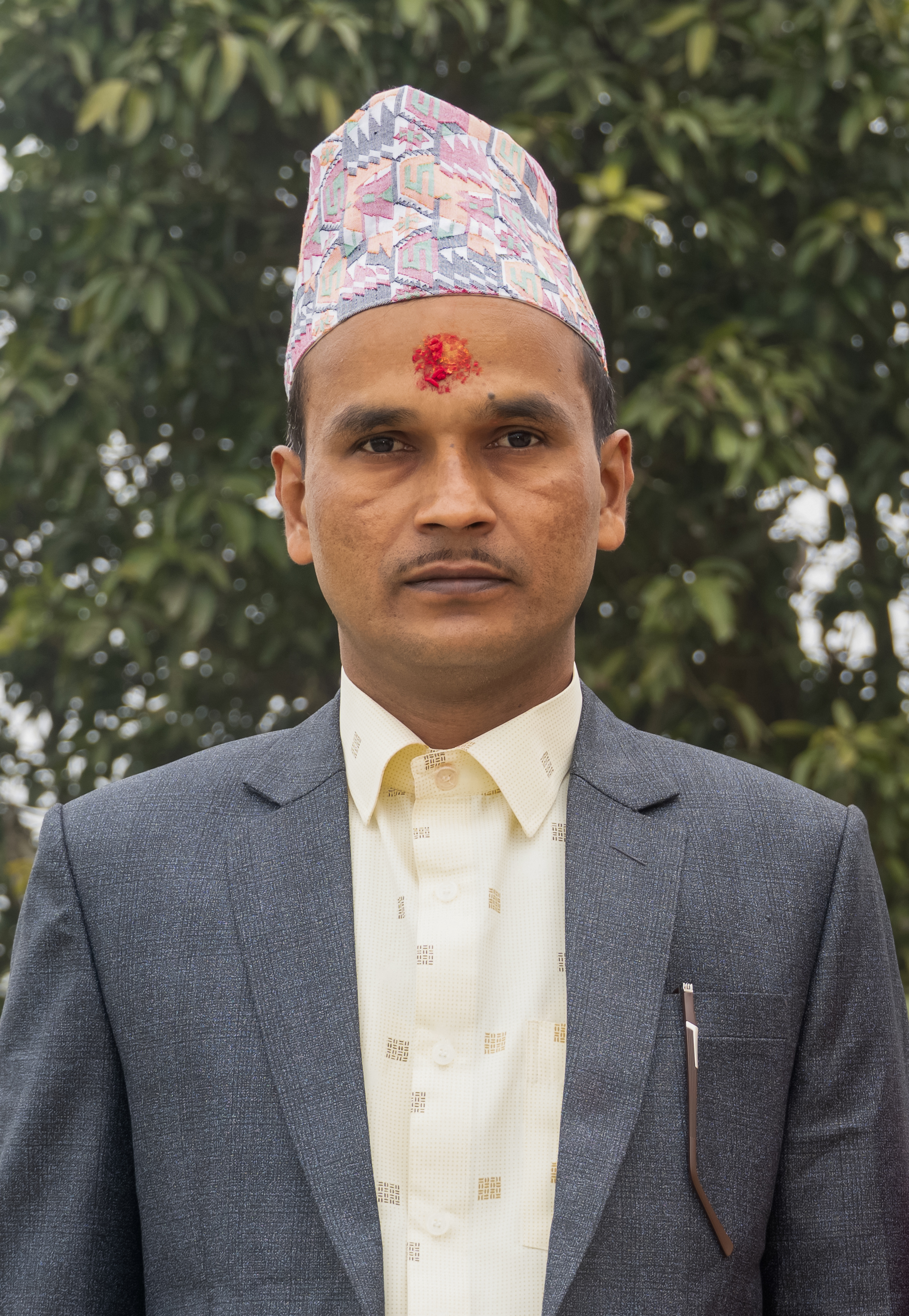
bhubaneshwor nepal (CHAIRPERSON, WARD-07)

Ratmate is a ward under Belkotgadhi Municipality but was village development committee in Nuwakot District in the Bagmati Province of central Nepal. At the time of the 1991 Nepal census it had a population of 2997 people living in 567 individual households. Bhubaneshwor Nepal is the president of this ward after local election held in 2079 BS where Mr. Nepal secured total of 835 votes. There are Villages like of Mahadevphant, ratmate and Chandretar. Mahadev Secondary School is the main educational hub. There are few brick company factory and there are huge sand/aggregate excavation from Trishuli river.

WARD 7 LOCAL ELECTION HISTORY
| Time period | president | Political Party |
| 2074 BS - 2079 BS | HEMNIDHI NEPAL | Nepali Congress |
| 2079 BS - PRESENT | BHUBANESHWOR NEPAL | Nepali congress |
