= Harkapur =

Former Village Development Committee in Nepal

Harkapur हर्कपुर
- Village development committee
- Location in Nepal
- Coordinates: 27.35°N 86.41°E
- Country: Nepal
- Zone: Sagarmatha Zone
- District: Okhaldhunga District

Population (1991)
  - Total: 2,499
- Time zone: UTC+5:45 (Nepal Time)

Harkapur is a village development committee in Okhaldhunga District in the Sagarmatha Zone of mid-eastern Nepal. At the time of the 1991 Nepal census, it had a population of 2499 living in 504 individual households.
