= Rumjatar =

Market in Siddhicharan, Nepal

Rumjatar is a market in Siddhicharan Municipality in the Okhaldhunga District in the Sagarmatha Zone of mid-eastern Nepal. It neighbours the airport beside the Solukhumbu District. This village center was merged into the municipality in May 2014. At the 1991 Nepal census, it had a population of 2,825 in 600 households. It is the birthplace of the Rumjatar Muffs.
