= Okhaldhunga District =

Coordinates: 27°19′N 86°30′E

Okhaldhunga District ओखलढुङ्गा जिल्ला
- District
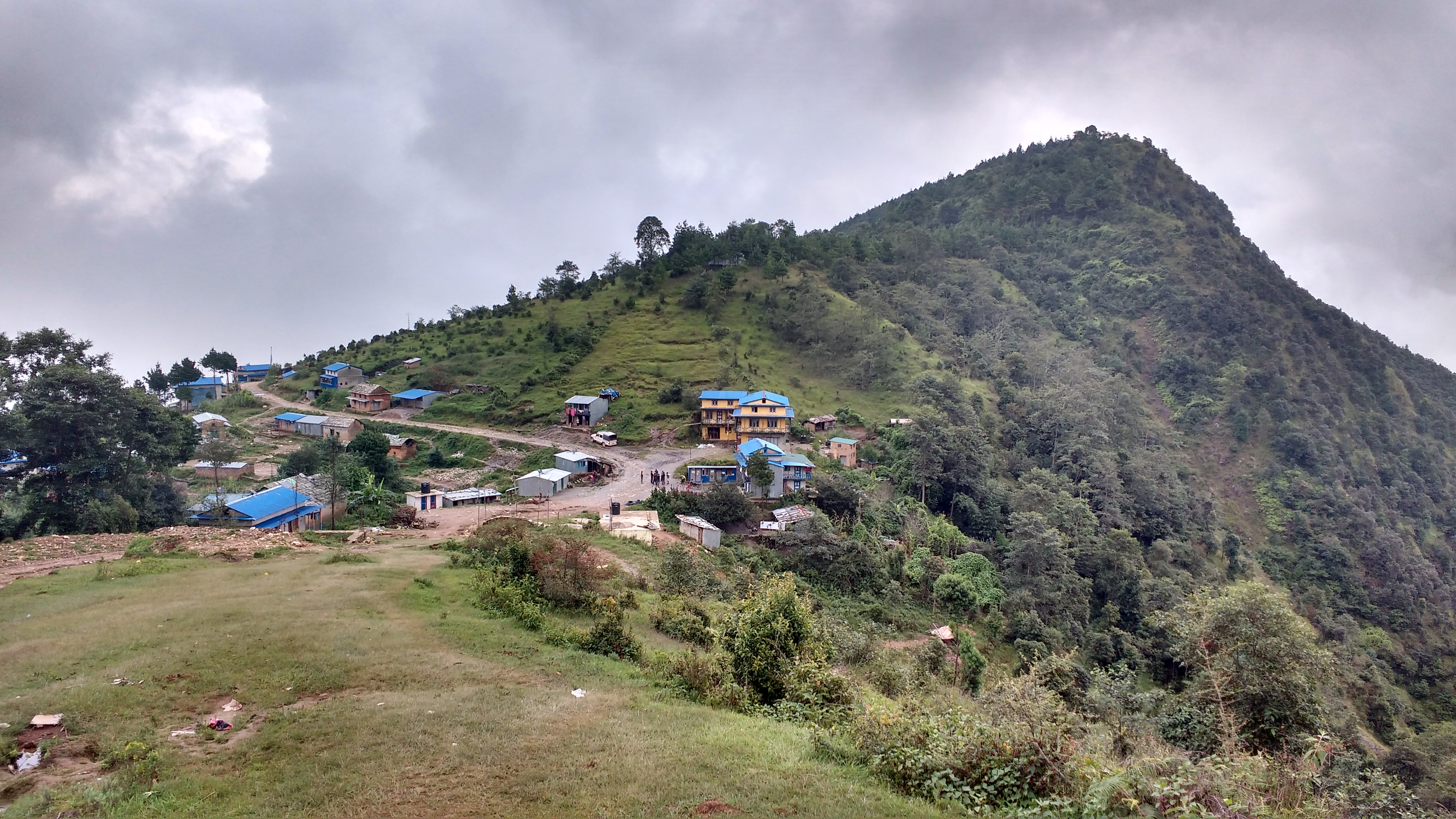
- Kosh Bhanjyang, Okhaldhunga

- Location of Okhaldhunga in dark yellow
- Country: Nepal
- Province: Koshi Province
- Admin HQ.: Siddhicharan Municipality

Government
  - Type: Coordination committee
  - Body: DCC, Okhaldhunga
  - Chief District Officer: Dil Kumar Tamang

Area
  - Total: 1,074 km^{2} (415 sq mi)

Population (2011)
  - Total: 147,984
  - Density: 137.8/km^{2} (356.9/sq mi)
- Time zone: UTC+05:45 (NPT)
- Main Language(s): Nepali language (official); Rai, Sunuwar language
- Website: ddcokhaldhunga.gov.np/en/

Okhaldhunga District (Nepali: ओखलढुङ्गा जिल्ला) is one of 14 districts of Koshi Province in eastern Nepal. The district, with the municipality of Okhaldhunga as its district headquarters, covers an area of 1,074.5 km^{2} (414.9 sq mi) and had a population of 156,702 in 2001 and 147,984 in 2011.

Okhaldhunga is the birthplace of Siddhicharan Shrestha. Shrestha, known as the Yug Kawi of Nepal (poet of the era), is a famous Nepali poet and is primarily known for his poem and song Mero Pyāro Okhalḍhungā (My dear Okhaldhunga).

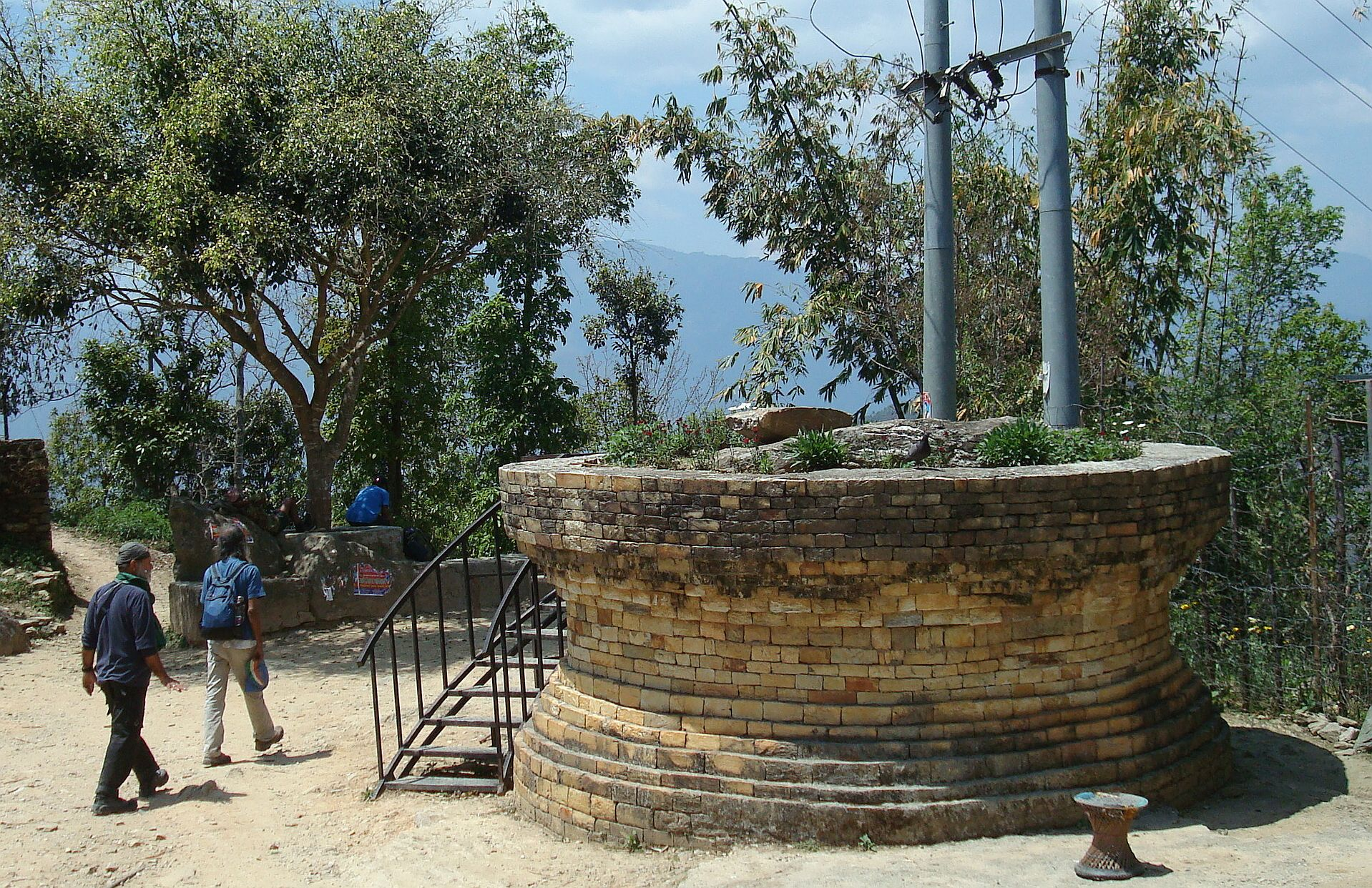
Okhaldunga name originated from this big old Mortar/Okhal in Nepali

== Geography and climate ==
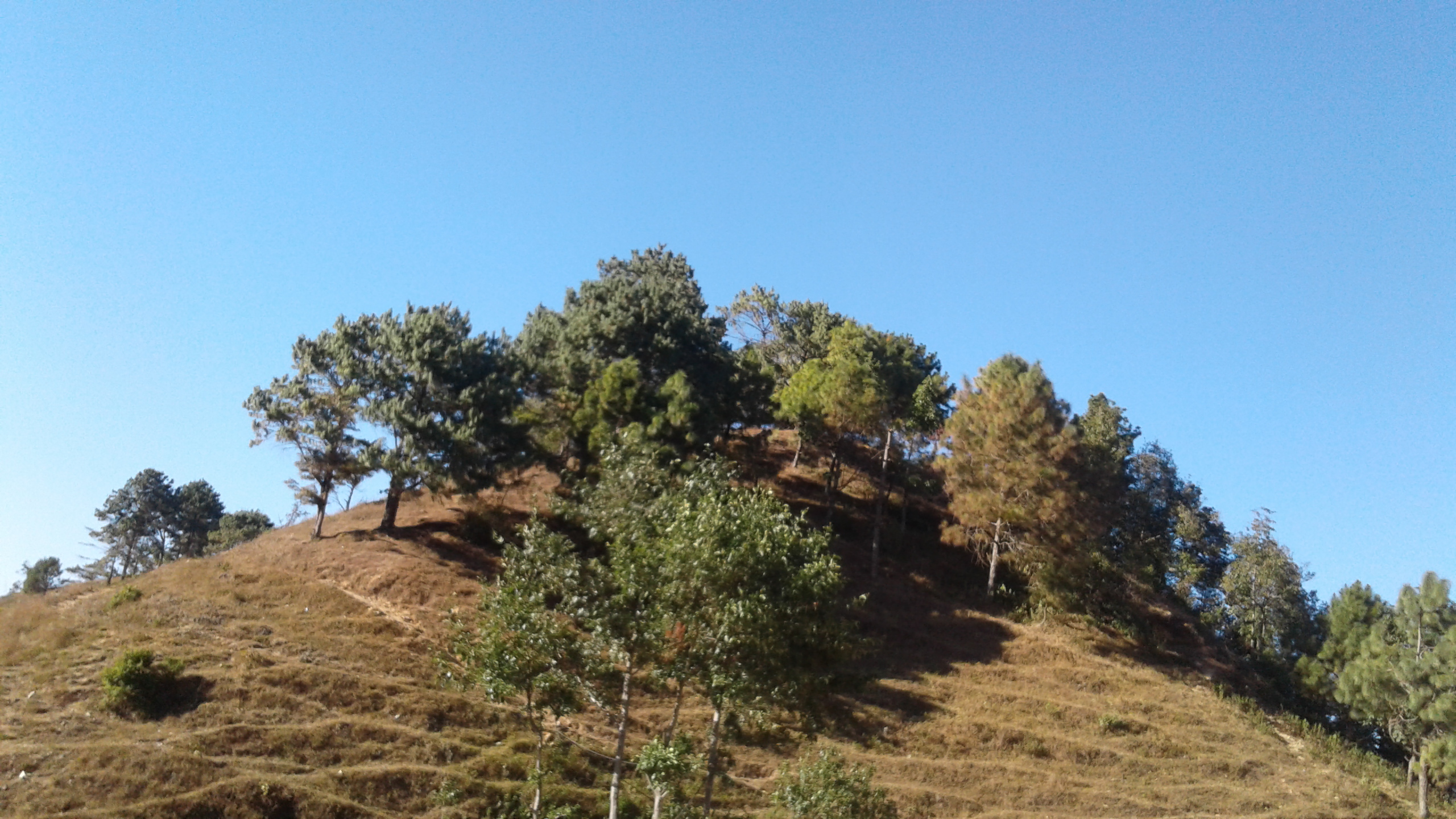
Okhaldhunga Bazaar entrance hill

Climate Zone	Elevation Range	% of Area
Upper Tropical	300 to 1,000 meters 1,000 to 3,300 ft.	22.2%
Subtropical	1,000 to 2,000 meters 3,300 to 6,600 ft.	51.1%
Temperate	2,000 to 3,000 meters 6,400 to 9,800 ft.	24.2%
Subalpine	3,000 to 4,000 meters 9,800 to 13,100 ft.	2.1%

== Demographics ==
Historical population
Year	Pop.	±% p.a.
1981	137,640	—
1991	139,457	+0.13%
2001	156,702	+1.17%
2011	147,984	−0.57%
2021	140,914	−0.49%

At the time of the 2021 Nepal census, Okhaldhunga District had a population of 140,914. It has a literacy rate of 73.9% and a sex ratio of 1050 females per 1000 males. 27,351 (19.41%) lived in municipalities.

Ethnicity/caste of Okhaldhunga (2021)
1. Rai (21.0%)
2. Chhetri (11.6%)
3. Magar (10.2%)
4. Tamang (9.94%)
5. Bahun (9.19%)
6. Sherpa (8.47%)
7. Newar (6.26%)
8. Kami (4.26%)
9. Sunuwar (3.68%)
10. Damai (3.39%)
11. Sarki (3.17%)
12. Other Hill Janjati (7.68%)
13. Others (1.16%)

Ethnicity/caste: 21.04% were Rai, 11.50% Chhetri, 10.48% Magar, 9.94% Tamang, 9.19% Hill Brahmin, 8.47% Sherpa, 6.26% Newar, 4.26% Kami, 3.68% Sunuwar, 3.39% Damai and 3.17% Sarki.

Religion in Okhaldunga District (2021)
Religion	Percent
Hinduism	64.95%
Buddhism	20.01%
Kirat Mundhum	13.46%
Christianity	1.52%
Other or not stated	0.06%

Religion: 64.95% were Hindu, 20.01% Buddhist, 13.46% Kirat, 1.52% Christian and 0.06% others.

Languages of Okhaldhunga district (2021)
1. Nepali (52.6%)
2. Tamang (10.2%)
3. Magar Dhut (9.70%)
4. Sherpa (8.36%)
5. Wambule (4.91%)
6. Bahing (4.74%)
7. Sunuwar (2.92%)
8. Newar (2.09%)
9. Jerung (1.74%)
10. Others (2.69%)

Mother tongue: Nepali was the majority language, spoken by 52.62% as their first language. Other languages were Tamang (10.23%), Magar Dhut (9.70%), Sherpa (8.36%), Wambule (4.91%), Bahing (4.74%), Sunuwar (2.92%), Newar (2.09%) and Jerung (1.74%). In 2011, 58.1% of the population spoke Nepali as their first language.

== Village development committees ==
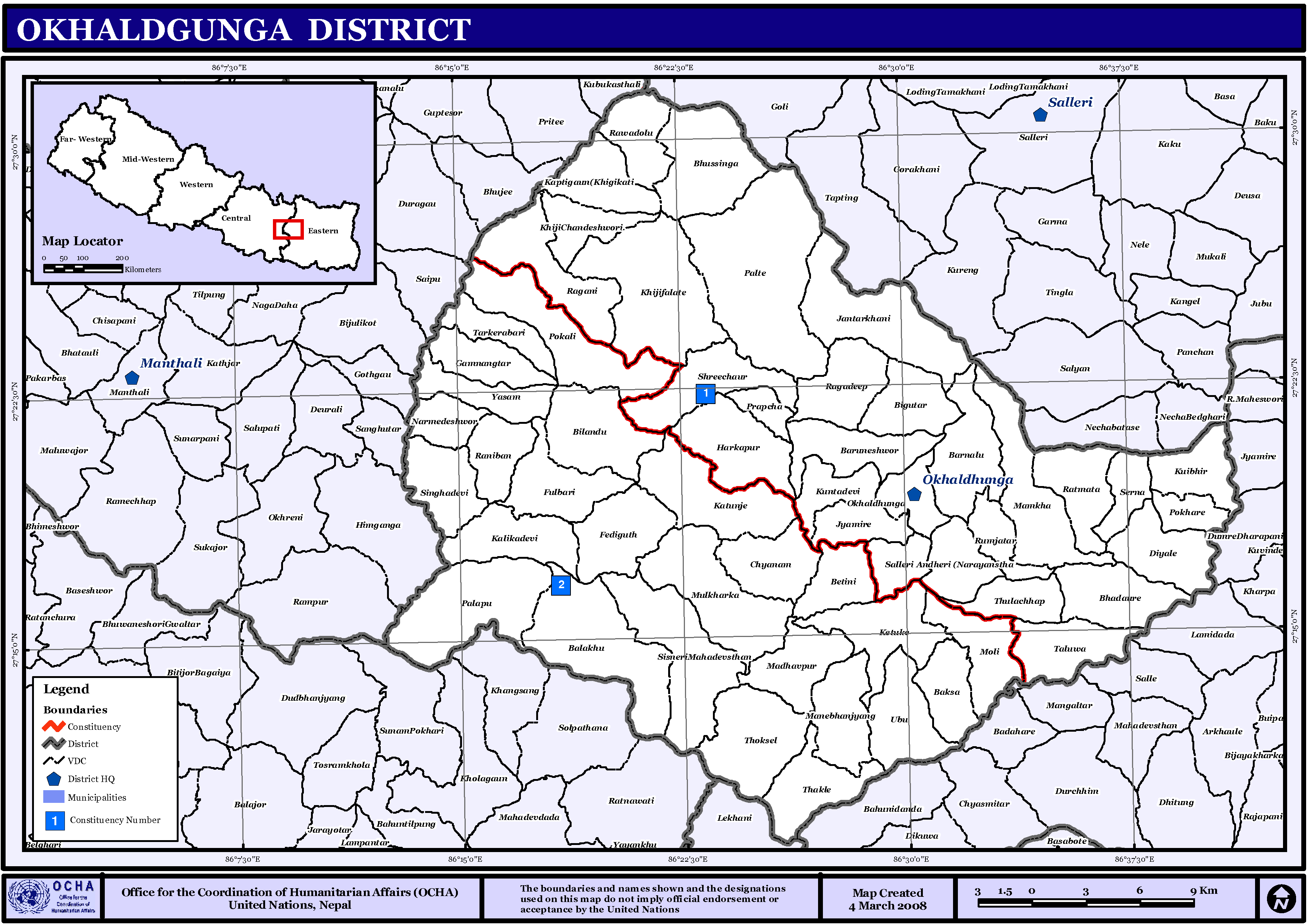
Map of the VDCs in Okhaldhunga District

The district contains the following VDCs from 2017:

Andheri Narayansthan, Baksa, Balakhu, Barnalu, Baruneshwor, Betinee, Bhadaure, Bhussinga, Bigutar, Bilandu, Chyanam, Diyale, Fediguth, Fulbari, Gamnangtar, Harkapur, Jantarkhani, Jyamire, Kalikadevi, Khijikati, Katunje, Ketuke, Khiji Chandeshwori, Khijifalate, Kuibhir, Kuntadevi, Madhavpur, Mamkha, Manebhanjyang, Moli, Mulkharka, Narmedeshwor, Okhaldhunga, Palapu, Patle, Pokali, Pokhare, Prapcha, Ragadip, Ragani, Raniban, Ratmate, Rawadolu, Rumjatar, Salleri, Serna, Shreechaur, Singhadevi, Sisneri, Taluwa, Tarkerabari, Thakle, Thoksela, Thulachhap, Ubu, Yasam

== Municipalities ==
- Siddhicharan Municipality
- Champadevi Rural Municipality
- Sunkoshi Rural Municipality
- Likhu Rural Municipality
- Chisankhugadhi Rural Municipality
- Molung Rural Municipality
- Khijidemba Rural Municipality
- Manebhanjyang Rural Municipality

== Tourist area ==
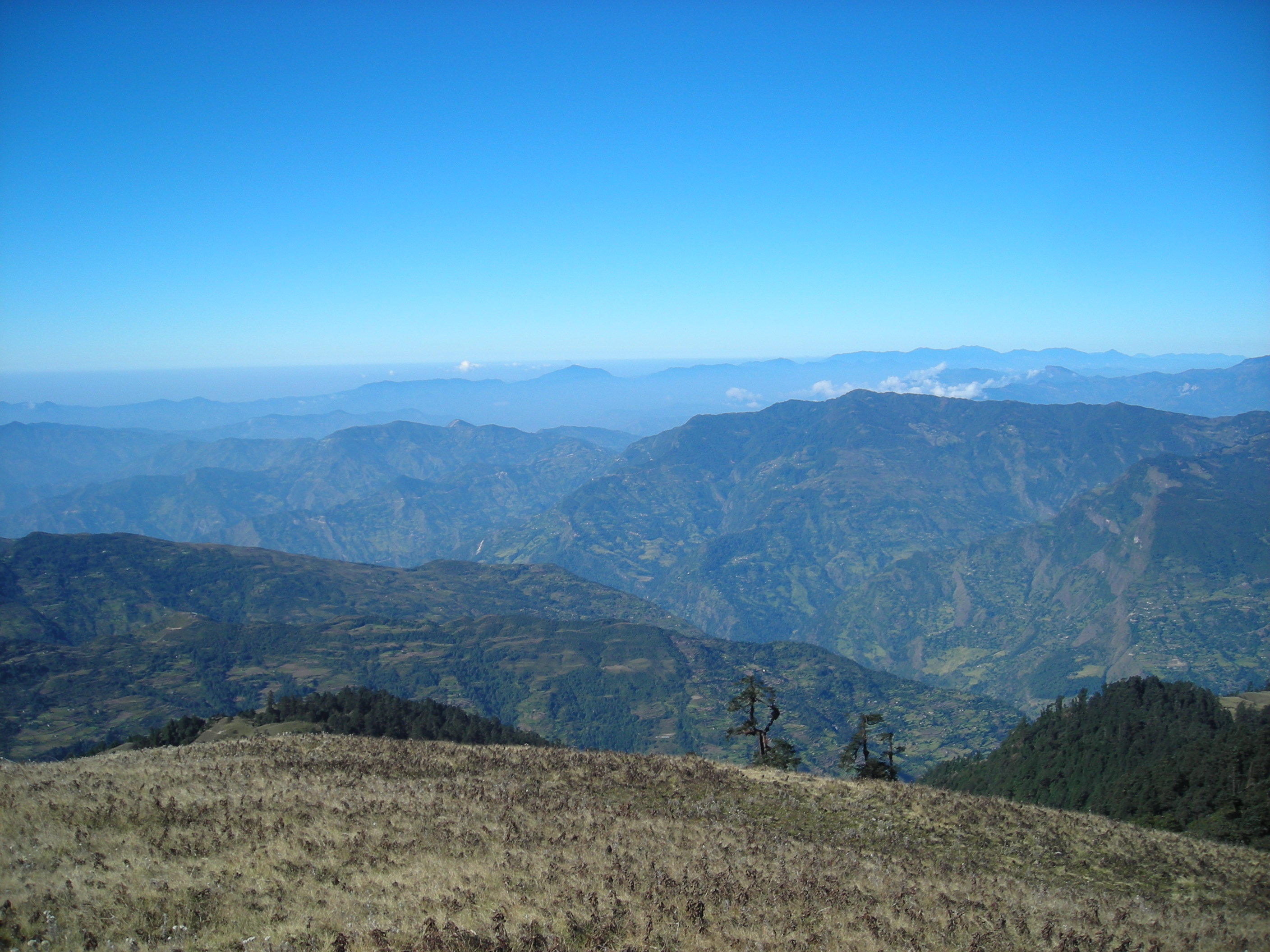
Khiji Tholedama

Tourists are attracted to the beauty of Khiji Okhaldhunga and Betinee Thuldhunga Okhaldhunga.

== See also ==
- Zones of Nepal
