= Sirsi Marikamba Temple =

Temple in Sirsi, Karnataka, India

- ಸಿರ್ಸಿ ಮಾರಿಕಾಂಬಾ ದೇವಸ್ಥಾನ
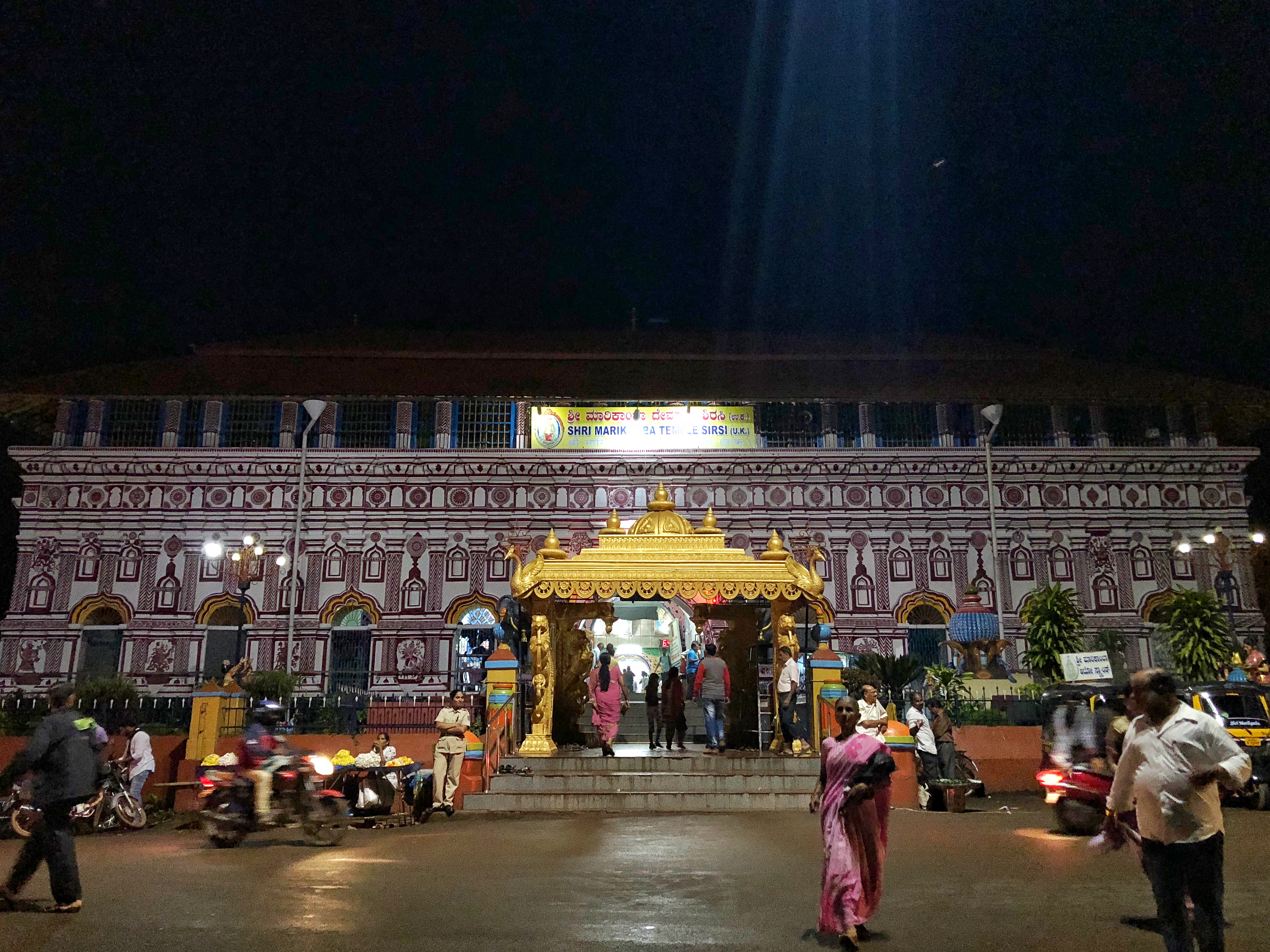
- Sirsi Marikamba Temple

- Location in Karnataka

Religion
- Affiliation: Hinduism
- Deity: Durga as Marikamba Devi

Location
- Location: Sirsi
- State: Karnataka
- Country: India
- Coordinates: 14.6119484°N 74.8395170°E

Architecture
- Style: Kavi art
- Founder: Villagers
- Established: 1688

Website
- marikambatemple.com

Sirsi Marikamba Devi
- Mother of Universe, Goddess of Power, Nourishment, Health, Motherhood, Rain and Harmony.
- Member of Tridevi Supreme Goddess in Shaktism
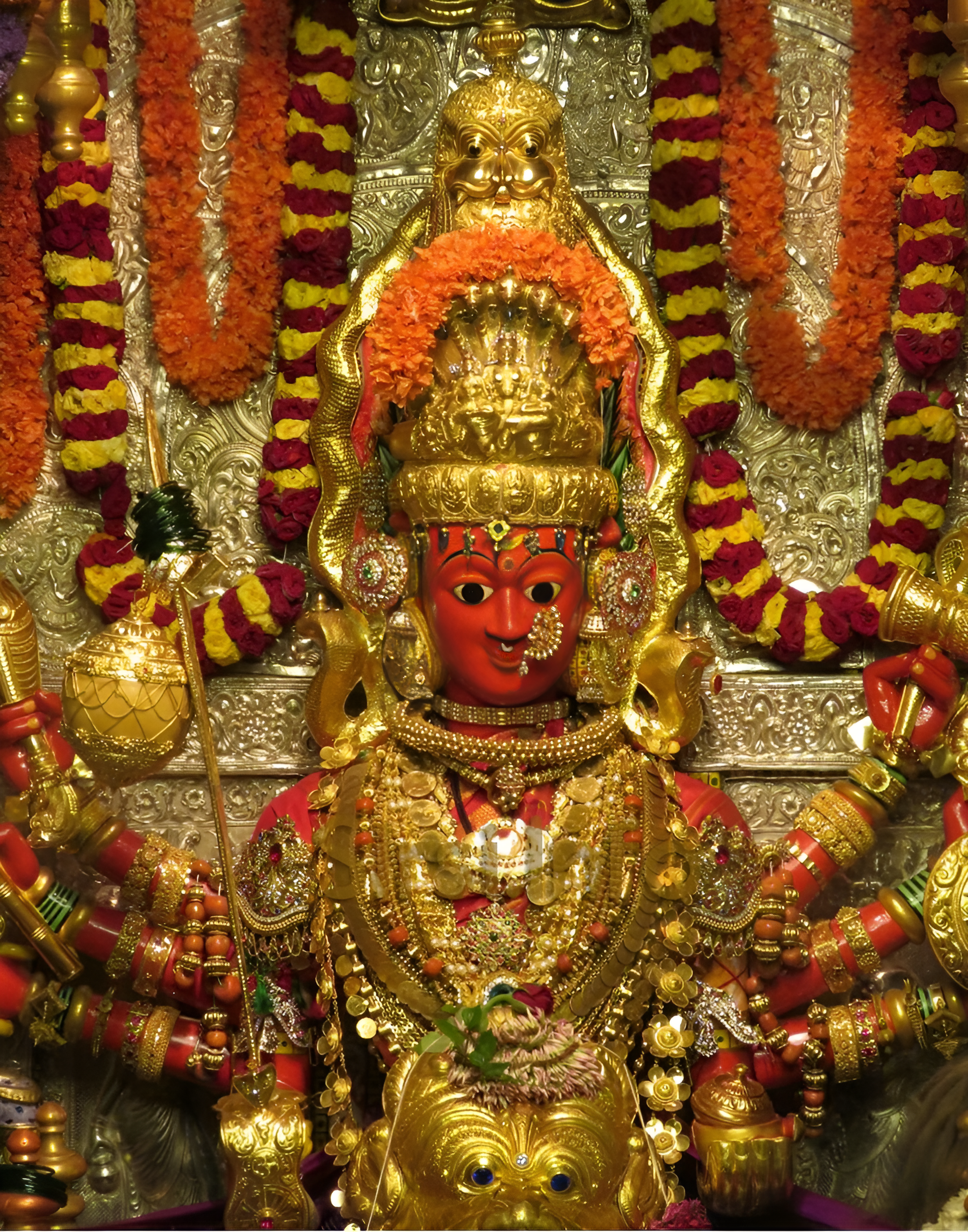
- Sirsi Marikamba Devi (Durga Devi )
- Other names: Sirsi amma Maari amma Durga Devi; Bhuvaneshwari; Mahishasura Mardini
- Kannada: ಸಿರ್ಸಿ ಮಾರಿಕಾಂಬಾ ದೇವಿ
- Affiliation: Parvati, Durga, Kali
- Abode: Sirsi
- Mantra: Om Sri Sirsi Marikambeyai Namha
- Weapons: Trishula; Sword; Gada; Damaru; Shankha; Shield; Scimitar; Kapala
- Day: Tuesday and Friday
- Color: Yellow (Turmeric); Red (Kunkuma)
- Mount: Tiger
- Texts: Folk, Mahabharata
- Region: Malenadu
- Ethnic group: Kannadigas
- Festivals: Sirsi Jathre; Sirsi Marikamba Jayanthi; Maha Shivratri; Holi; Ugadi; Gowri Habba; Navaratri; Vijayadashami; Durga Puja; Kannada Rajyotsava; Karthikotsava

Genealogy
- Born: Viratanagara (Hangal)
- Consort: Shiva

Equivalents
- Tamil: Mariyamman

Sirsi Fair ಸಿರ್ಸಿ ಜಾತ್ರೆ
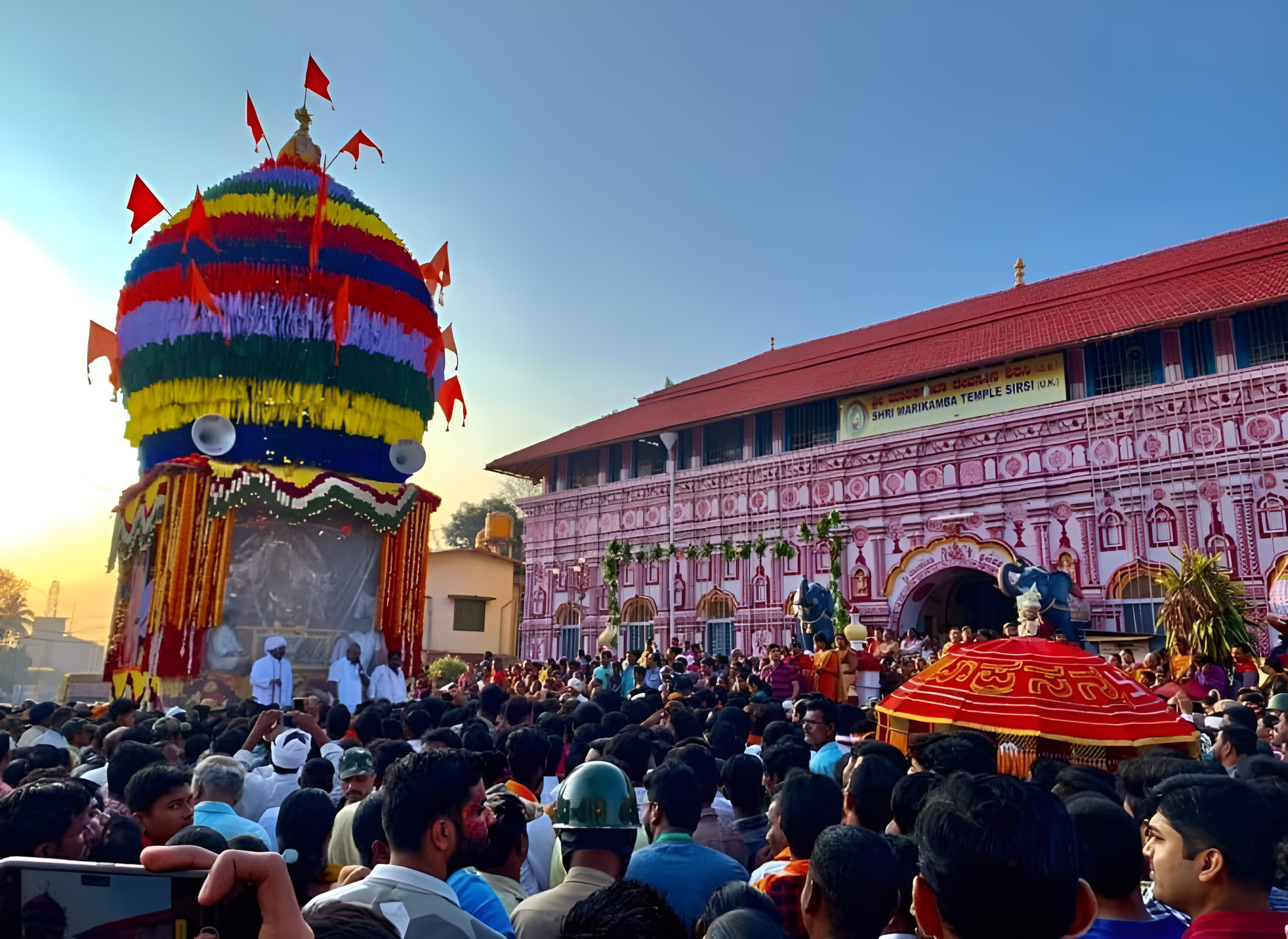
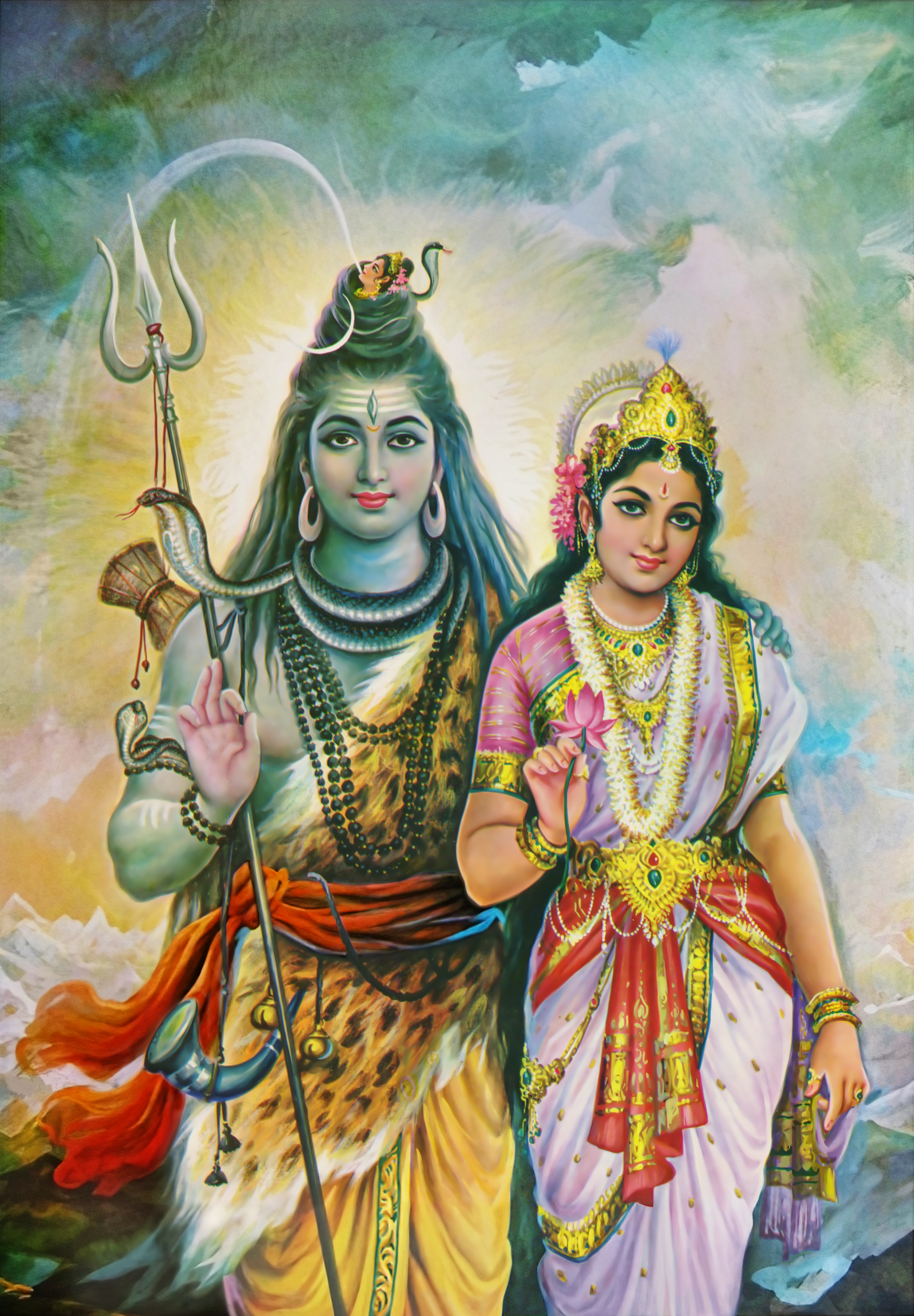
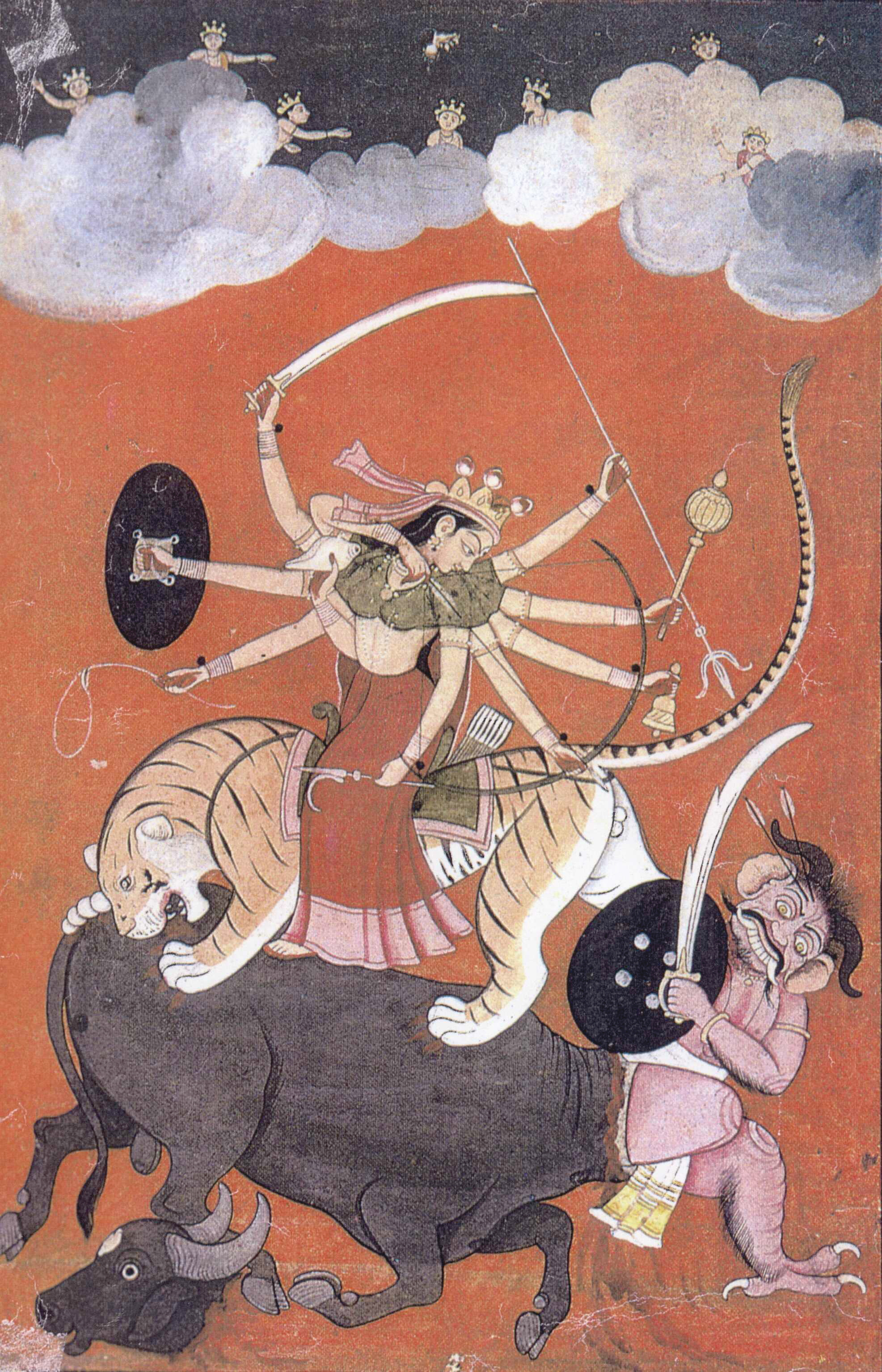
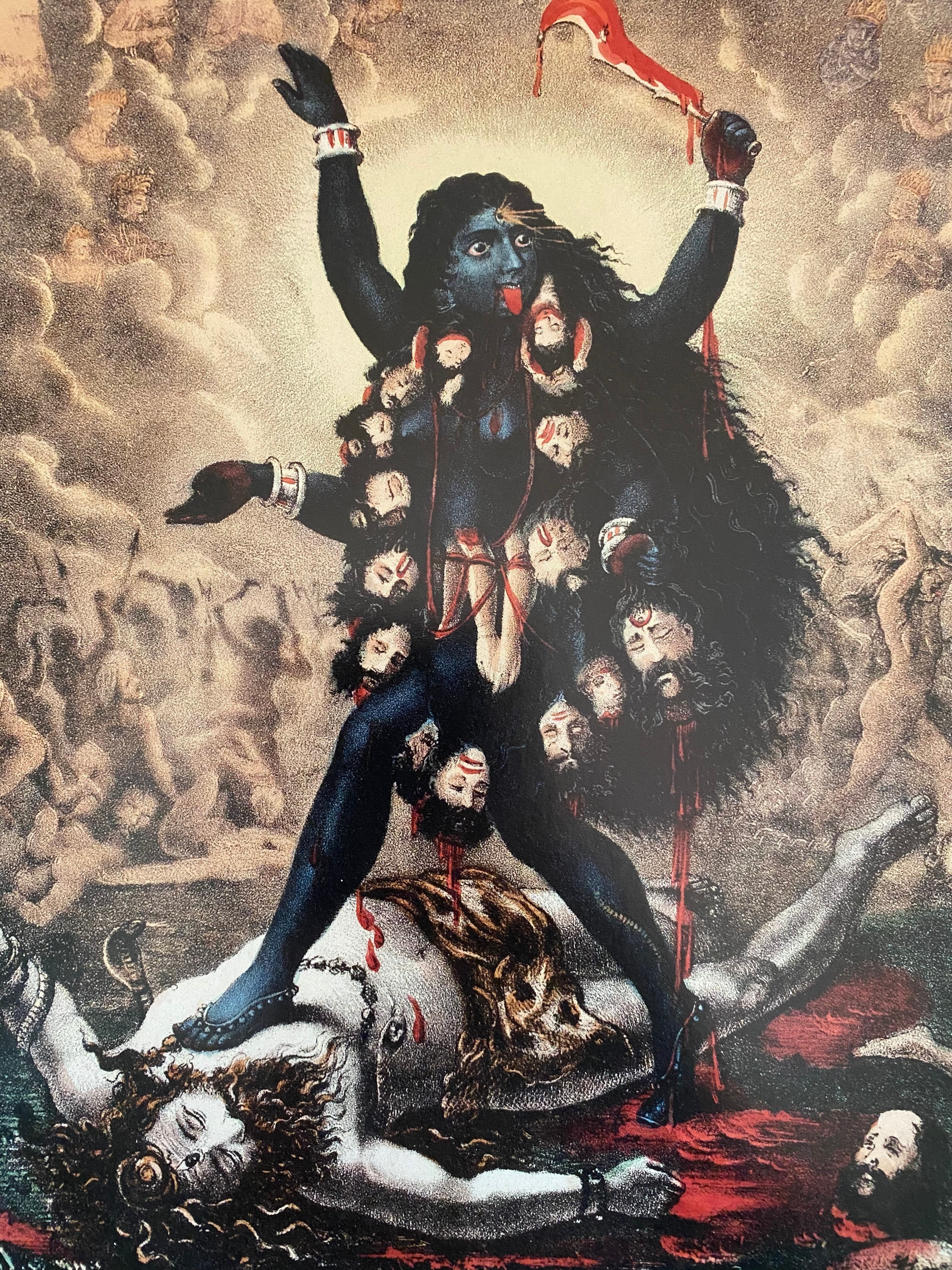
- Sirsi Marikambe Rathotsava (Sirsi Marikambe rushing towards Mahishamandala/Bidkibail to slay demon Mahishasura) (Day 1); Shiva-Sirsi Marikambe Marriage (Parvati avatar) (Day 2); Sirsi Marikambe slaying Mahishasura (Durga avatar) (Day 9); Fierce Sirsi Marikambe walk (Kali avatar)
- Status: Active
- Genre: Fair
- Begins: 24 February 2026
- Ends: 4 March 2026
- Frequency: Biennial
- Venue: Sirsi
- Years active: 338
- Inaugurated: 1688
- Founder: Villagers
- Previous event: 2024
- Next event: 2028
- Attendance: 25,00,000+
- Major events: Parvati avatar Day 1: Shiva-Sirsi Marikambe marriage Durga avatar Day 2: Sirsi Marikambe slay demon Mahishasura; Day 2-9 : Vijayotsava Kali avatar Day 9: Sirsi Marikambe fiercely walk towards outskirts of the city
- Organiser: Sirsi Marikamba Temple
- 2026
- South India's Biggest Fair

Sirsi Marikamba Temple is a Hindu temple dedicated to Marikamba Devi (Durga Devi), located in Sirsi, Karnataka, It is also known as Marigudi. It was built in 1688.

== Features ==
The temple's façade, a 19th-century addition, is painted blue. After one enters through the façade, there is courtyard in the middle, which has cloisters surrounding it. The cloisters are filled with images of deities from the Hindu epics. The changes made inside the temple have hidden any evidence of older structures. The sanctum sanctorum has the central image of a fierce form of the goddess Durga, multi-armed (eight shoulders), riding a tiger and killing a demon. It is believed that the 7-foot-tall (2.1 m) image was retrieved from a pond on the road to Hangal. The temple has very special paintings of murals in Kaavi art, an art form which was popular in the coastal Konkan region of Karnataka. In this art form, now extinct, the top plastered layer of the mural was first dyed with a red pigment, which when removed revealed a lower white layer of plaster over which the murals were created.

== Worship ==
The main priest at the temple belongs to the Vishvakarma (Vishvabrahmin) community.

When Mahatma Gandhi visited Sirsi in 1934 he refused to visit the temple, as animal sacrifice was a prevalent ancient practice at the temple; the sacrifice was in the form of offering of he-buffalo as a sacrifice to appease the goddess. A he-buffalo was specially bred for offering as a sacrifice to the deity during the biennial Rathayatra (chariot festival). Following Gandhi's protest, there was a successful movement in the town to abolish animal sacrifice spearheaded by Keshwain, chief trustee of the temple, in association with Vitthal Rao Hodike, a teacher and dedicated Gandhian of the town.

== Gallery ==
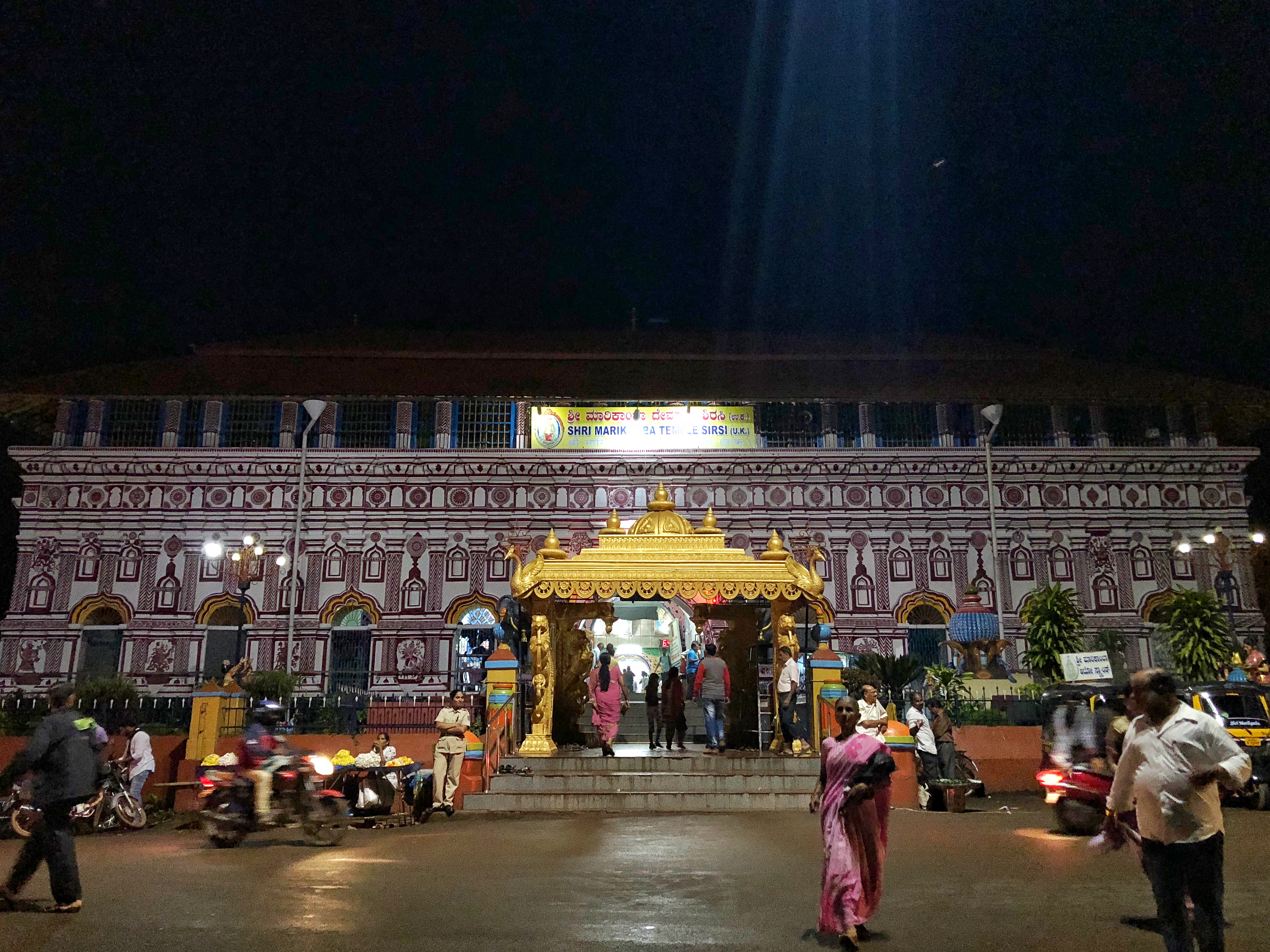
Temple front view

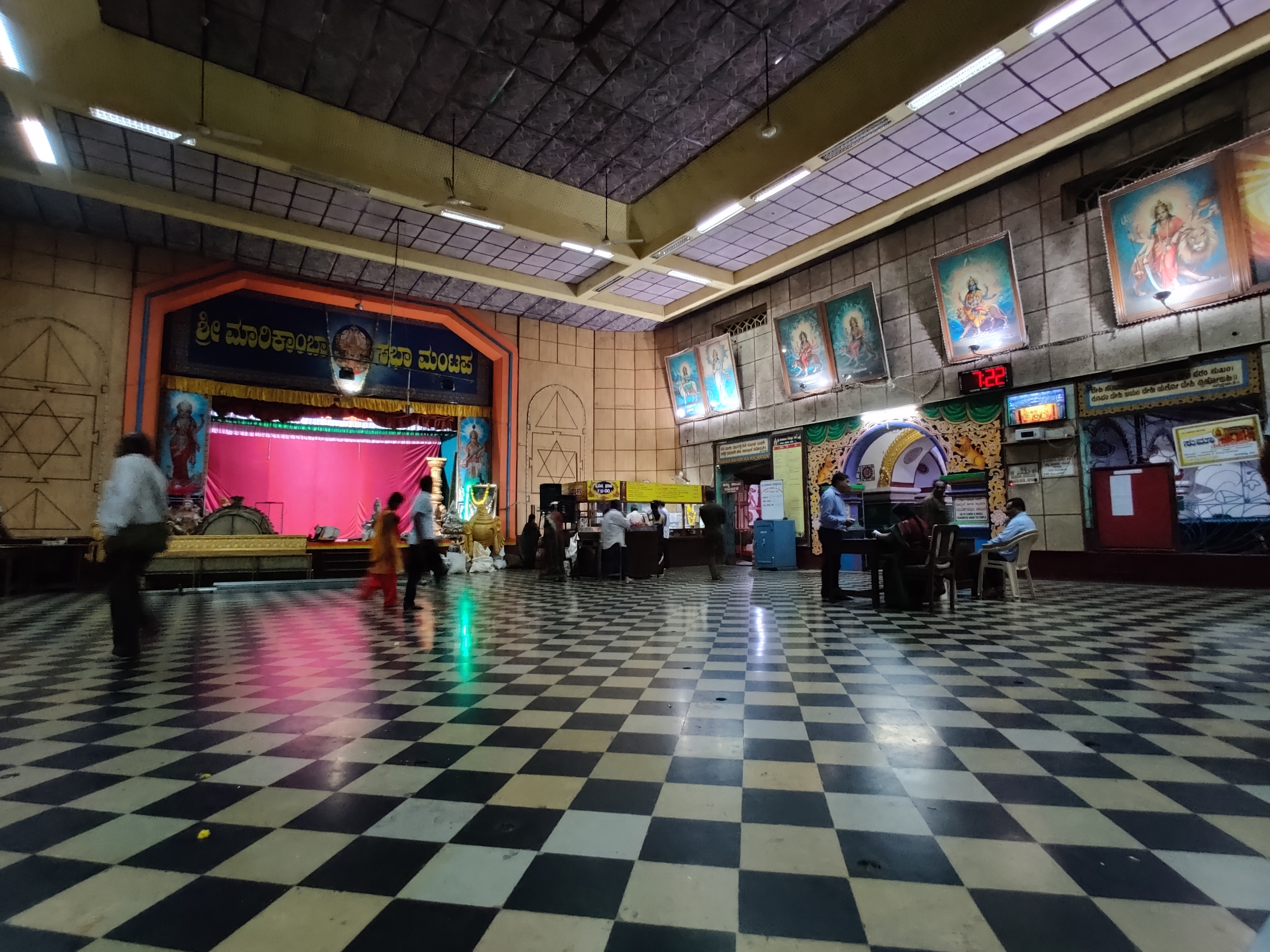
Temple hall

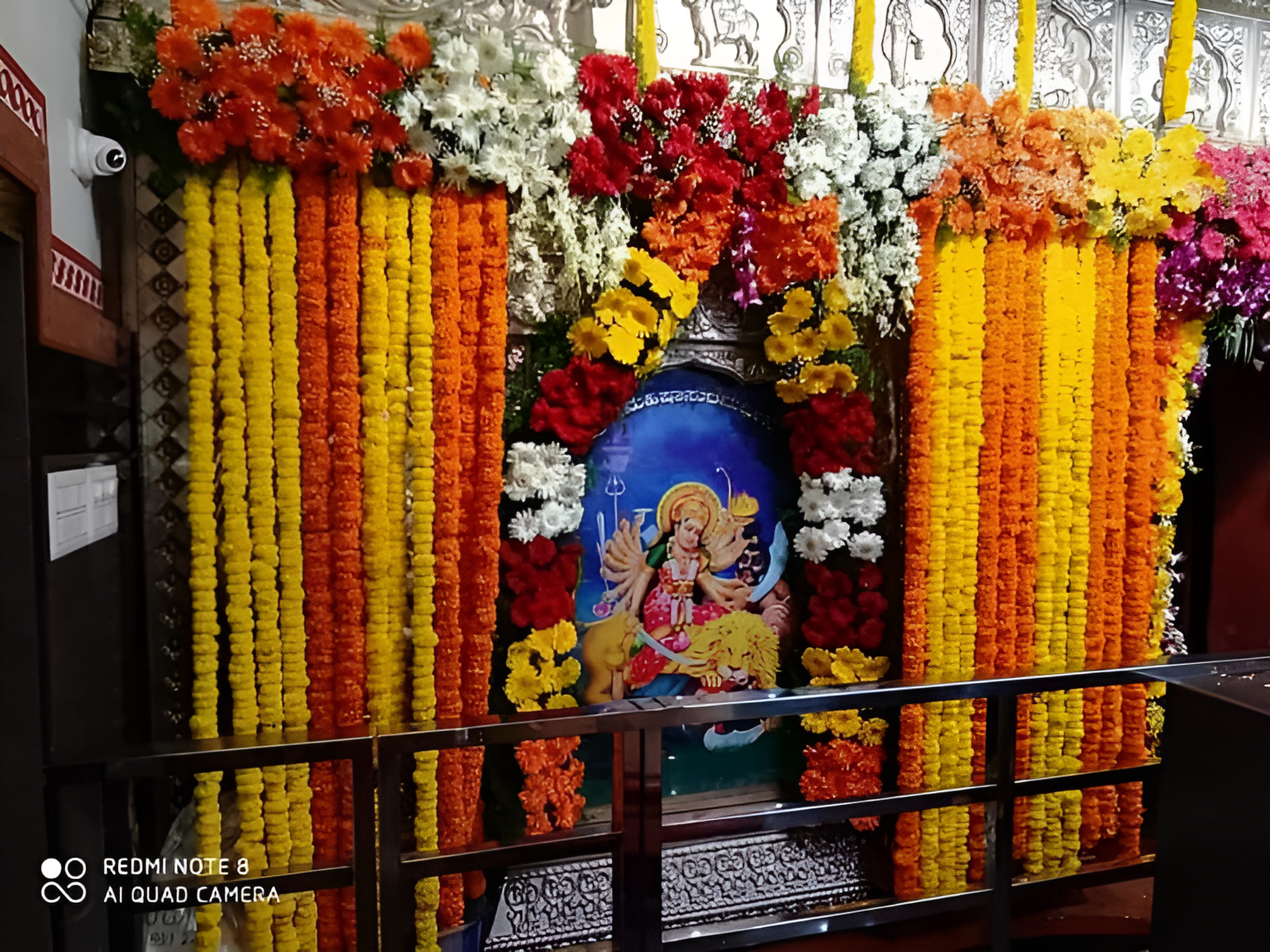
Mahishasura mardhini image inside temple

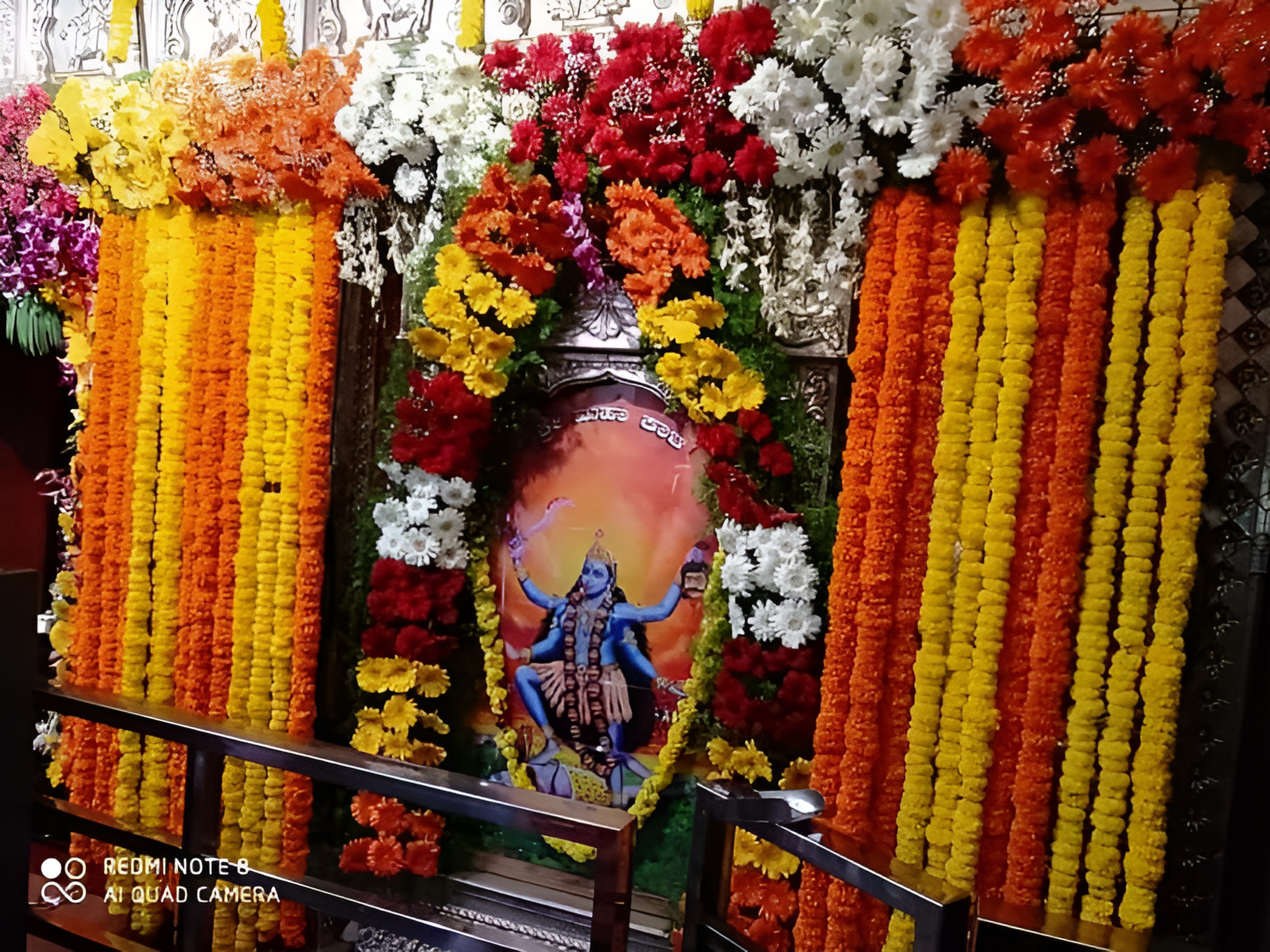
Kali image inside temple

== See also ==
- Chamundeshwari Temple, Mysore
- Mookambika Temple, Kollur
- Annapurneshwari Temple, Horanadu
- Yellamma Temple, Saundatti
