= Sous l'Emprise des esprits =

- Directed by: Eric Weymeersch
- Screenplay by: Antoon Van Overschelde
- Produced by: Africa-Films
- Cinematography: Roger de Vloo
- Release date: 1947
- Country: Belgium

Sous l'Emprise des esprits is a 1947 film.

== Synopsis ==
A polygamist tribe chief, Mutana, has seven wives, one Christian, one pagan, and the others unknown. After speaking with the witch doctor, the pagan wife poisons one of the Christian's wife's sons. Meanwhile, Mutana consults with the witch doctor who suggests he kill one of the Christian children to save his own child. However, he errs his target.
