= Lag-na =

Musical instrument

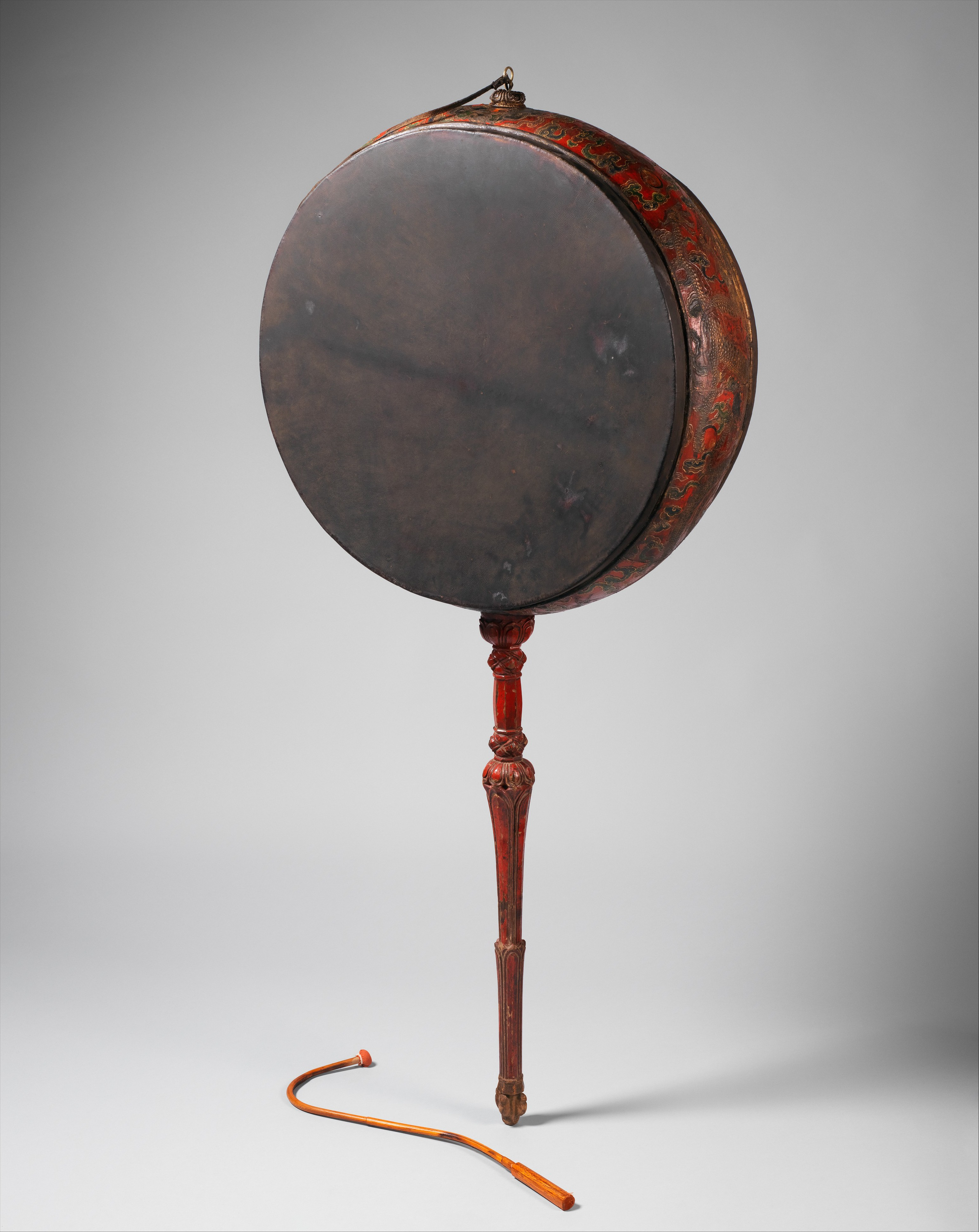
- Rnga or Lag-Rnga (exhibited at the MET)

Percussion instrument
- Other names: Na
- Classification: Frame drum
- Hornbostel–Sachs classification: 211.32 (Directly struck membranophone)

A lag-na, or na, is an ancient Tibetan frame drum. The drumhead has a minimum diameter of about one metre. Like the dhyāngro (the principal drum of the jhakri shamans of Nepal), the lag-na has a carved, wooden handle. One plays the na by striking its drumhead with a heavy percussion mallet.

== See also ==
- Damaru, a small, two-headed drum of Hindu and Tibetan Buddhist tradition
