= Witch doctor =

Type of healer in many traditional medicine systems

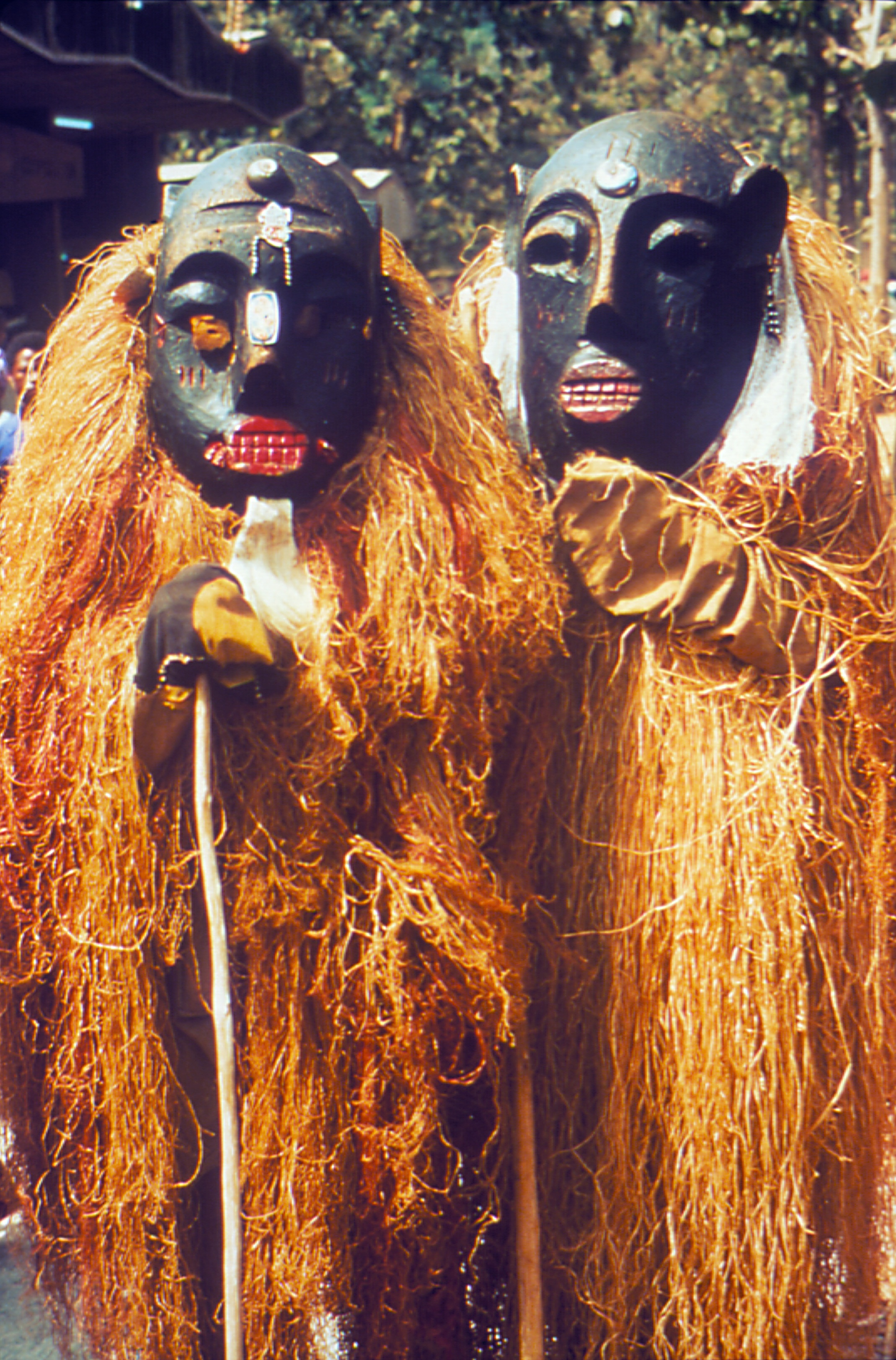
Two Lassa witch doctors in Nigeria

A witch doctor (also spelled witch-doctor), or witchcraft doctor, is a traditional practitioner, primarily in African indigenous societies, who employs divination, rituals, and herbal concoctions to identify supernatural causes of illness (such as witchcraft or malevolent spirits) and to effect cures through magical or spiritual interventions. The term is often misunderstood, and they could more accurately be called "anti-witch doctors". The term is now more commonly used to refer to healers, particularly in regions that use traditional healing rather than contemporary medicine. In many contexts, the term "witch doctor" may be used interchangeably with shamans or medicine men, as these practitioners employ ritual, divination, song, and dance to address spiritual, emotional, and social dimensions of health.

== Original meaning of the term ==
In its original meaning, witch doctors were not exactly witches themselves, but rather people who had remedies to protect others against witchcraft. Witchcraft-induced conditions were their area of expertise, as described in this 1858 news report from England:

Recourse was had by the girl's parents to a cunning man, named Burrell, residing at Copford, who has long borne the name of "The Wizard of the North:" but her case was of so peculiar a character as to baffle his skill to dissolve the spell, Application was next made to a witch doctor named Murrell, residing at Hadleigh, Essex, who undertook to effect a cure, giving a bottle of medication, for which he did not forget to charge 3s. 6d., and promising to pay a visit on Monday evening to the "old witch," Mrs. Mole, and put an end to her subtle arts... ...the news of the expected coming of the witch-doctor spread far and wide, and about eight o'clock there could not have been less than 200 people collected near the cottage of Mrs. Mole to witness the supernatural powers of the Hadleigh wizard.

== In Europe ==
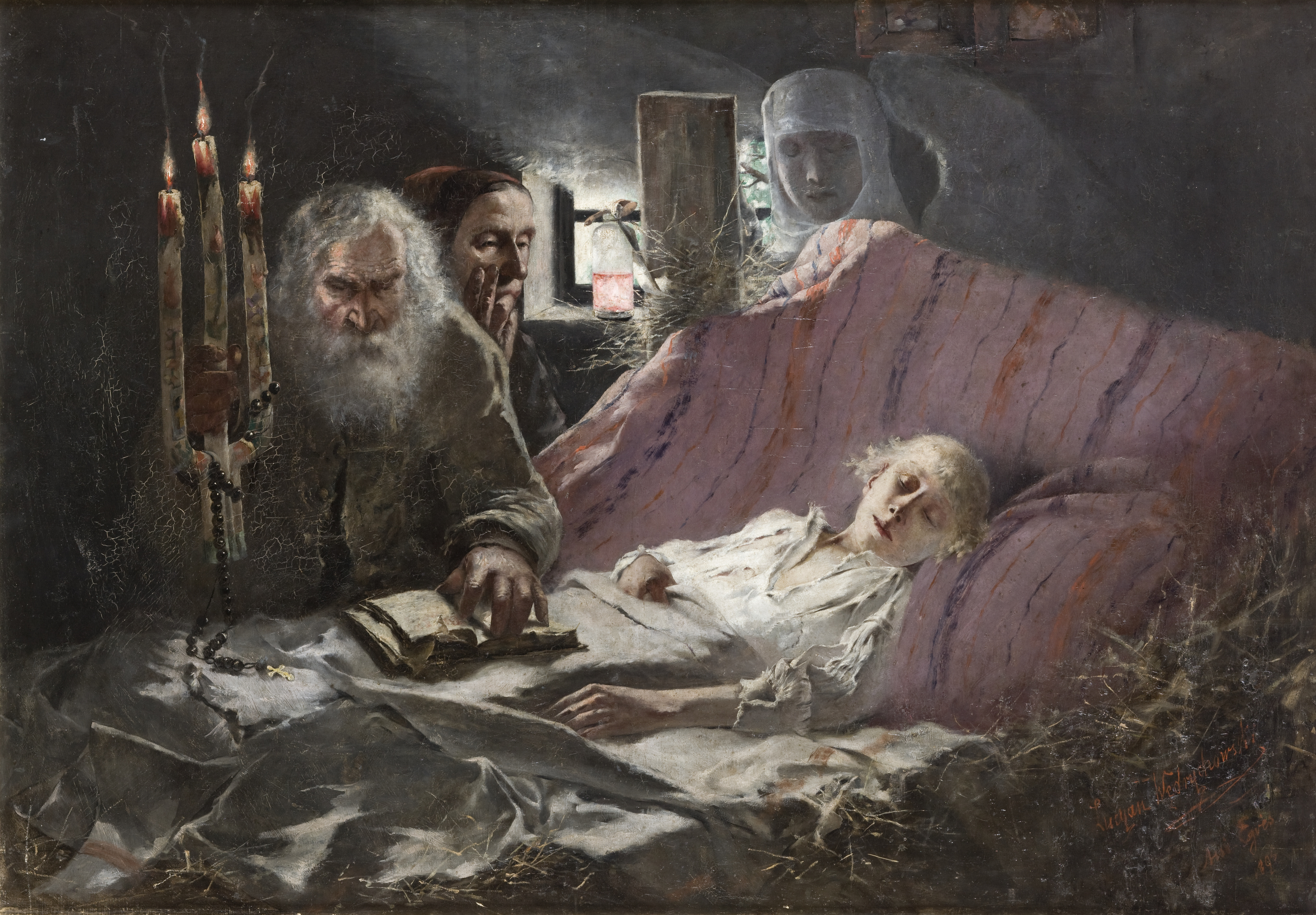
Znachor, Slavonic witch doctor, painting by Lucjan Wędrychowski from 1895.

The Oxford English Dictionary states that the first record of the use of this term was in 1718, in Francis Hutchinson's work An Historical Essay concerning Witchcraft, with Observations upon Matters of Fact; tending to Clear the Texts of the Sacred Scriptures, and Confute the Vulgar Errors about that Point. Hutchinson used the phrase in a chapter defending a prisoner who was charged with witchcraft, by asserting that the "Witch-Doctor" himself was the one using sorcery:

The said Dorothy Durent, having been with a Witch-Doctor, acknowledges upon Oath, that by his Advice she hang'd up her Child's Blanket in the Chimney, found a Toad in it at Night, had put it into the Fire, and held it there tho' it made a great and horrible Noise, and flash'd like Gunpowder, and went off like a Pistol, and then became invisible, and that by this the Prisoner was scorch'd and burn'd lamentably.

Charles Mackay's book, Extraordinary Popular Delusions and the Madness of Crowds, first published in 1841, attests to the practice of belief in witch doctors in England at the time.

In the north of England, the superstition lingers to an almost inconceivable extent. Lancashire abounds with witch-doctors, a set of quacks, who pretend to cure diseases inflicted by the devil. The practices of these worthies may be judged of by the following case, reported in the "Hertford Reformer," of the 23rd of June, 1838. The witch-doctor alluded to is better known by the name of the cunning man, and has a large practice in the counties of Lincoln and Nottingham. According to the writer in "The Reformer," the dupe, whose name is not mentioned, had been for about two years afflicted with a painful abscess and had been prescribed for without relief by more than one medical gentleman. He was urged by some of his friends, not only in his own village but in neighbouring ones, to consult the witch-doctor, as they were convinced he was under some evil influence. He agreed and sent his wife to the cunning man, who lived in New Saint Swithin's, in Lincoln. She was informed by this ignorant impostor that her husband's disorder was an infliction of the devil, occasioned by his next-door neighbours, who had made use of certain charms for that purpose. From the description he gave of the process, it appears to be the same as that employed by Dr. Fian and Gellie Duncan, to work woe upon King James. He stated that the neighbours, instigated by a witch, whom he pointed out, took some wax, and moulded it before the fire into the form of her husband, as near as they could represent him; they then pierced the image with pins on all sides – repeated the Lord's Prayer backwards, and offered prayers to the devil that he would fix his stings into the person whom that figure represented, in like manner as they pierced it with pins. To counteract the effects of this diabolical process, the witch-doctor prescribed a certain medicine, and a charm to be worn next to the body, on that part where the disease principally lay. The patient was to repeat the 109th and 119th Psalms every day, or the cure would not be effectual. The fee which he claimed for this advice was a guinea.

In European anthropological and cross-cultural scholarship, the terms witch doctor, shaman, and medicine man have often been used interchangeably to describe ritual specialists who perform healing or divination. notes that many hunter–gatherer societies have ritual practitioners who employ similar techniques to address illness or misfortune, even when known by different local names. European observers applied the label "witch doctor" to indigenous healers from Africa, Central America, and other regions, who frequently perform roles analogous to shamans, including ceremonial, divinatory, and medicinal practices within their communities.

== In Africa ==
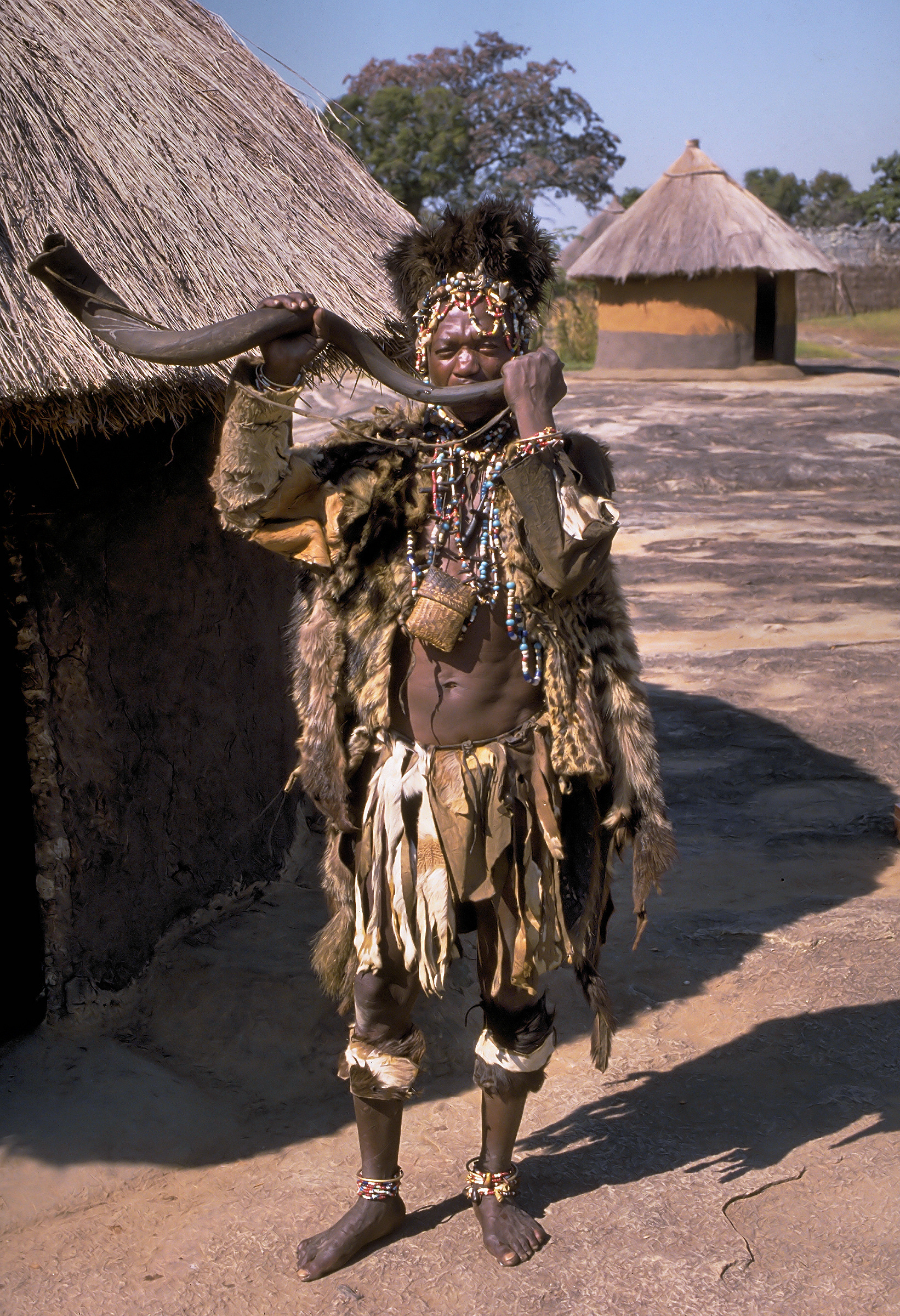
Shona traditional healer, or n'anga (Zimbabwe).

In southern Africa, traditional healers are known as sangomas. The Oxford English Dictionary states that the first use of the term "witch doctor" to refer to African shamans (i.e. medicine men) was in 1836 in a book by Robert Montgomery Martin.

BBC News reported, on March 12, 2015, that, "More than 200 witchdoctors and traditional healers have been arrested in Tanzania in a crackdown on the murder of albino people. The killings have been driven by the belief – advanced by some witchdoctors – that the body parts have properties that confer wealth and good luck. According to the Red Cross, witchdoctors are prepared to pay $75,000 (£57,000) for a complete set of albino body parts. Nearly 80 albino Tanzanians have been killed since 2000, the UN says. The latest victims include a one-year-old albino boy, killed in north-western Tanzania. The government banned witchdoctors in January 2015 as part of its efforts to prevent further attacks and kidnappings targeting people with albinism."

In southern Africa, some scholars describe Sangomas as shamanic ritual specialists who serve as intermediaries between the physical and spiritual worlds. Sangomas continue to play a central role in community health, spiritual life, and social cohesion. They diagnose and treat illnesses believed to be caused by spiritual imbalance, misfortune, or witchcraft. Their practices combine ritual, divination, and the use of medicinal plants, reflecting a holistic approach that integrates spiritual, symbolic, and practical knowledge. Healing is not limited to the physical body; it encompasses emotional, spiritual, and social well-being, reinforcing relationships within the community and with ancestral spirits.

Sangomas acquire their knowledge through years of apprenticeship under experienced healers. This training often begins when a trainee is chosen through spiritual signs, dreams, or lineage. Apprentices learn to identify and prepare medicinal plants, understand the spiritual significance of rituals, and master songs, dances, and symbolic actions used during healing ceremonies. Instruction in interpreting dreams, visions, and other spiritual signs equips the apprentice to diagnose and treat ailments while maintaining ethical and ritual propriety, and mentorship also emphasizes guidance on interacting with patients and the community, including respect, authority, and responsibility.

Ngoma healers employ a multidimensional approach in which song, dance, symbolic actions, and community participation work together to restore both individual well-being and social harmony. Rituals allow for the expression of personal distress, engagement with spirits, and emotional release, while medicines, offerings, and metaphors drawn from natural and cosmological themes help patients understand their illness within a broader cultural framework. Sangomas’ work extends beyond individual healing: they frequently lead communal ceremonies that strengthen collective identity and social bonds. These ceremonies may involve rites of passage, festivals, or seasonal rituals linked to agriculture, rainfall, or environmental cycles. Their work may include advising community leaders, mediating disputes, performing rituals for agricultural fertility, or offering protection against misfortune. Central to these practices is the engagement with ancestral spirits, who provide guidance in both personal and social matters. By facilitating relationships between humans, spirits, and the natural environment, Sangomas maintain the balance and harmony essential for the well-being of the community. Their knowledge, authority, and ongoing practice demonstrate how traditional healing systems continue to adapt and maintain relevance in contemporary African societies.

== In Central America ==
In Central America, spiritual healers, referred to as shamans, can also refer to witch doctors. Shamans are specialists who use altered states of consciousness to engage with unseen realities and provide services such as healing and divination. Healing performed by shamans integrates spiritual, psychological, and social dimensions. Rituals may involve song, dance, trance, communal participation, and, in some cases, psychoactive plants. Shamans act as custodians of specialized knowledge, interpreting dreams, spiritual signs, and personal experiences to diagnose ailments and guide treatment.

Ethnographic research among indigenous peoples, including the Mentawai, documents ceremonies in which shamans employ ritual, music, and symbolic action to restore balance to individuals and communities. Healing addresses physical symptoms as well as emotional, spiritual, and social well-being, and shamans function as intermediaries between the human and spiritual realms, maintaining cultural continuity and guiding communities in navigating personal and collective challenges. Apprenticeship is central to shamanic practice. Trainees learn to recognize spiritual signs, interpret dreams, perform rituals, and understand the effects of psychoactive plants. Shamans' knowledge is culturally embedded and socially sanctioned, giving them authority as both healers and ritual specialists. Their work often involves counseling, social mediation, and community guidance, highlighting the interconnection between physical health, mental health, and social harmony.

Shamans also use symbolic language, song, and dance to communicate with spirits and convey complex ideas about illness, misfortune, and personal distress. Rituals provide a structured space for communal participation, allowing the community to witness and support the healing process. In addition, shamans play a central role in cultural preservation: they transmit traditional knowledge, myths, and histories to apprentices and the wider community. By combining practical knowledge of medicinal plants with symbolic, spiritual, and psychological insights, shamans integrate multiple forms of knowledge in their healing practices, demonstrating a holistic approach in which health encompasses physical, emotional, spiritual, and social dimensions. Their work links individual well-being to the broader community, reflecting the integral role of spiritual healers in sustaining social, ecological, and cultural balance.

== In Nepal and Northeastern India ==
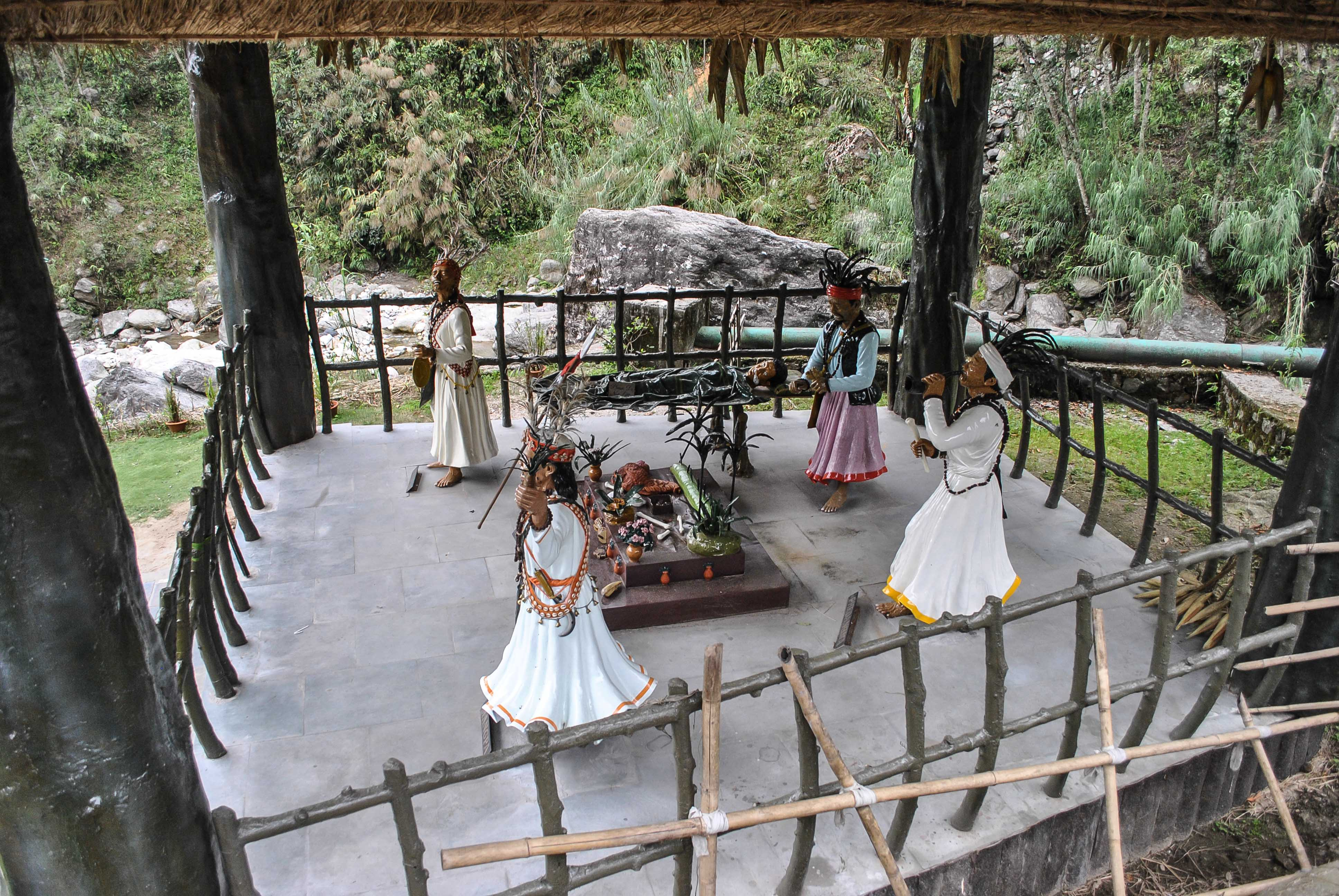
Statues of jhākri at Banjhakri Falls and Energy Park in Gangtok, Sikkim, India

Jhākri (Nepali: झाक्री) is the Nepali word for shaman. It is sometimes reserved specifically for practitioners of Nepali shamanism, such as that practiced among the Tamang people and the Magars; it is also used in the Indian states of Sikkim and West Bengal, which border Nepal.

Jhākri shamanism is practiced among numerous ethnic groups of Nepal and Northeast India, including the Limbu, Rai, Sunwar, Sherpa, Kami, Tamang, Gurung, Magars, Lepcha and Khas. Belief in spirits is prevalent, hence also the fear of spirit possession. Some vernacular words for jhākri are phedangbo in the Limbu language, maangpa or nakchyong in Khambu, and boongthing in Lepcha.

Jhākris perform rituals during weddings, funerals, and harvests. They diagnose and cure diseases. Their practices are influenced by Hinduism, Tibetan Buddhism, Mun, and Bön rites.

Even now the indigenous ethnic groups of Assam, Northeastern India (especially in the Mayong region as well other rural places) have shamanistic medicine men who treat diseases using sorcery as well as witchcraft and black magic for which the area was once renowned. Similar Shamans and Medicine Man are prevalent among the indigenous communities throughout the rural areas of NE India.

== See also ==
- Bomoh
- Curandero
- Dukun
- Kahuna
- Nganga
- Plastic shaman
- Prophetic medicine
- Quimbanda
