= Dhyāngro =

Musical instrument

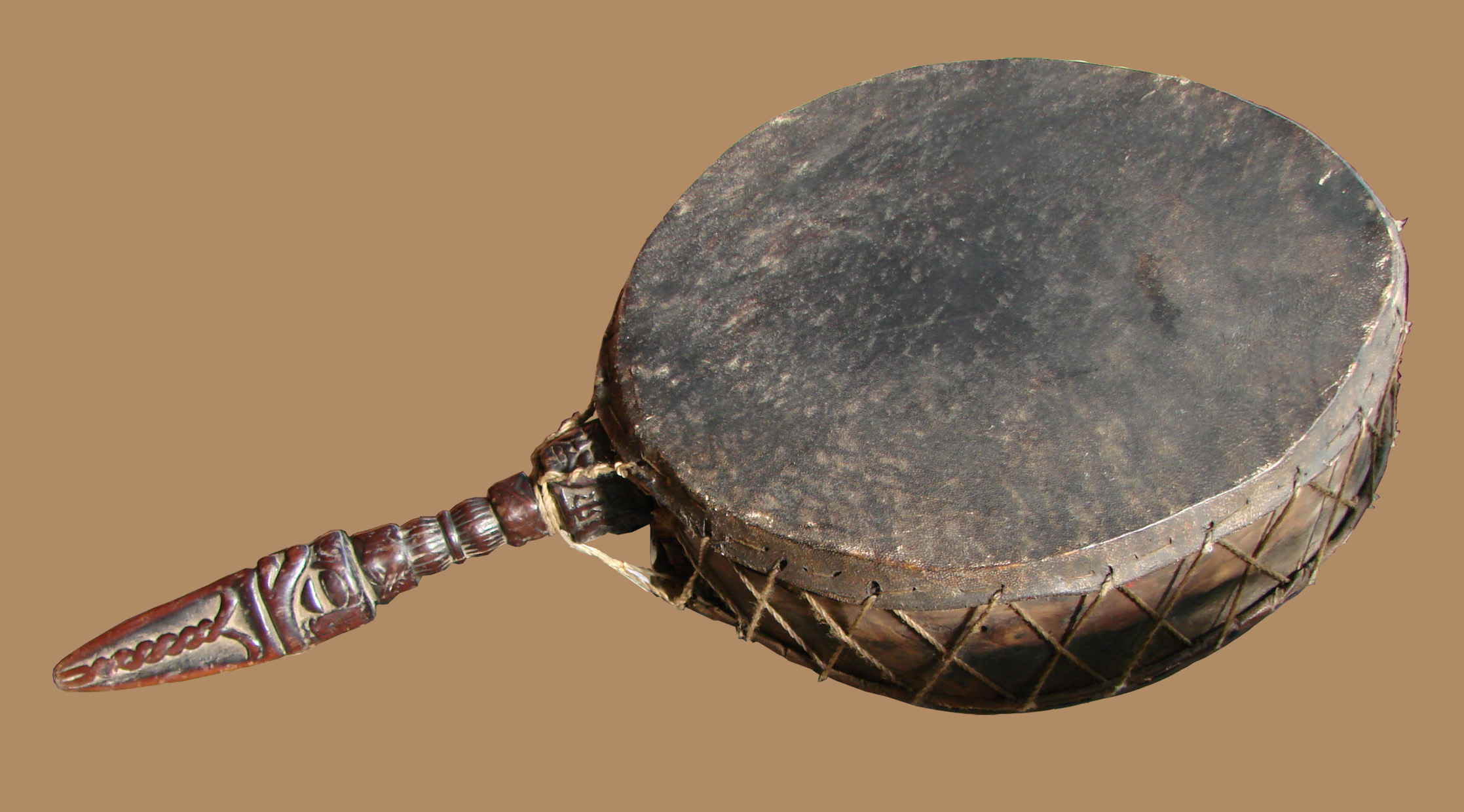

Percussion instrument
- Classification: Frame drum
- Hornbostel–Sachs classification: 211.32 (Directly struck membranophone)

The dhyāngro is a frame drum played by the jhakri (shamans) of Nepal and India—especially those of the Magars, the Kirati, and the Tamang—as well as by Tibetan Buddhist musicians.

== Fabrication ==
The dhyāngro may be either single- or double-headed. Double-headed drums are said to have a male side and a female side. The drumhead, which is made from animal skin, is struck with a curved beater fashioned from cane.

The frame may also be equipped with jingles. Like the na drum of Tibet, but unlike most frame drums, the dhyāngro usually has a handle. The carving in the wooden handle of a dhyāngro may be quite intricate; owing to Buddhist influence, the handles of some drums are fashioned into a kīla.

== Ceremonial use ==
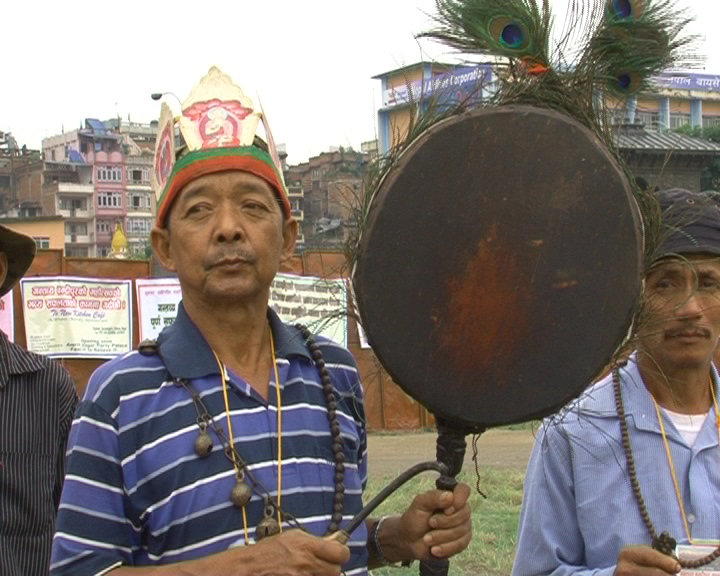
A Nepali jhakri holds up a dhyāngro with his left hand, and holds the beater in his right.

In Nepal, a jhakri (shaman) plays the dhyāngro during traditional shamanic ceremonies.

The drum is occasionally used in Tibetan Buddhist celebrations, as in an orchestra performing Buddhist music.

For example: in Malaysia, such a performance greeted the seventh Ling Rinpoche when he visited the Tadika Than Hsiang Farlim and Child Care Centre on Penang Island.

== See also ==
- Navneet Aditya Waiba
- Damaru
- Banjhakri and Banjhakrini
- List of Nepali musical instruments
- Music of Nepal
