= Silnyen =

Musical instrument

The silnyen (Tibetan: སིལ་སྙན།, Wylie: sil snyan), or flat bell, is a Tibetan percussion instrument in the form of a cymbal with a small or no central boss, played by striking by horizontal movement. The silnyen is unique to the Bön religion and is primarily used for the tantric meditative practice of Chöd, representing the feminine aspect when used alongside the Chöda.

== See also ==
- Rolmo
- Tibetan music
