= Damaru =

South Asian two-headed drum

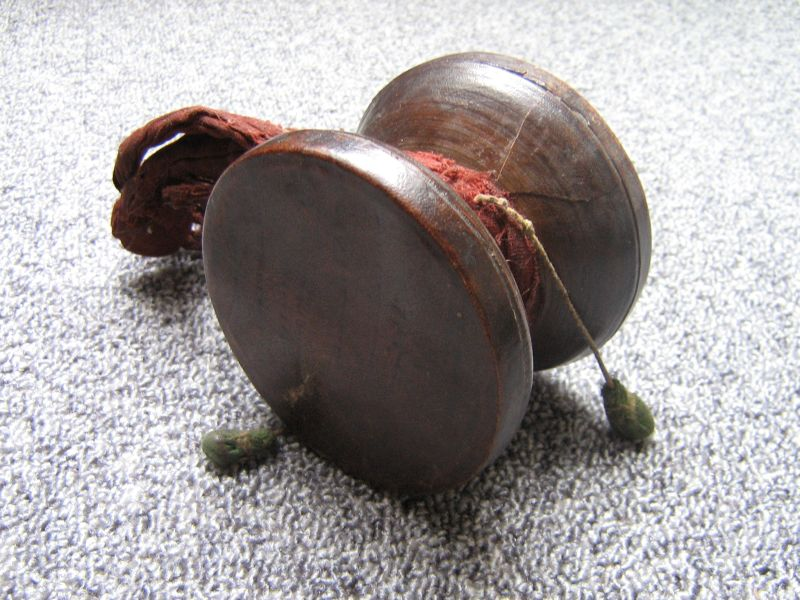
- A Tibetan damaru
- Hornbostel–Sachs classification: 212.241 (Membranophone. Individual hourglass-shaped rattle vi drums (under revised Hornbostel Sachs classifications))

A damaru (Sanskrit: डमरु, IAST: ḍamaru; Tibetan ཌ་མ་རུ་ or རྔ་ཆུང) is a small two-headed drum used in Hinduism and Tibetan Buddhism. In Hinduism, the damaru is known as the instrument of the Hindu deity Shiva, associated with Tantric traditions. It is said to be created by Shiva to produce spiritual sounds by which the whole universe has been created and regulated. In Tibetan Buddhism, the damaru is used as an instrument in meditation practices.

== Description ==
The damaru is typically made of wood, metal with leather damaru heads at both ends. The resonator is made of brass. Its height ranges from a few inches to a little over one foot. It is played single-handedly. The strikers are typically beads fastened to the ends of leather cords around the waist of the damaru. Knots in the leather can also be used as strikers; crocheted material is also common. As the player waves the drum using a twisting wrist motion, the strikers beat on the drumhead.

== In Hinduism ==
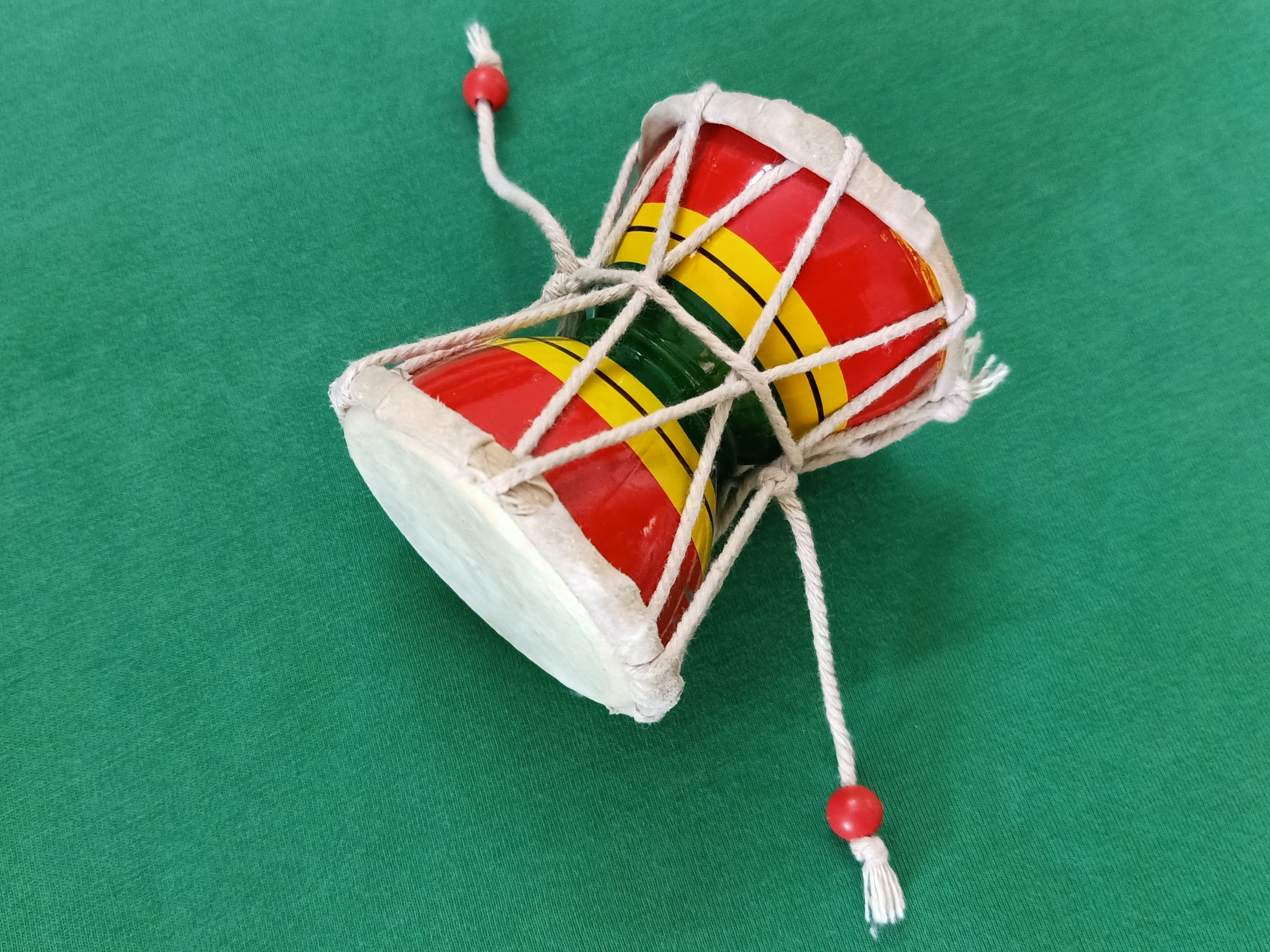
Damaru

The damaru is very common throughout the Indian subcontinent. It is associated with the Hindu deity Shiva. It is believed that Sanskrit language was recognized by the drumbeats of the damaru (see Shiva Sutra for the sounds), and his performance of the cosmic dance of tandava. The damaru is used by itinerant musicians of all stripes, due to its small portable size.

=== Damaru-coinage of Kosambi ===
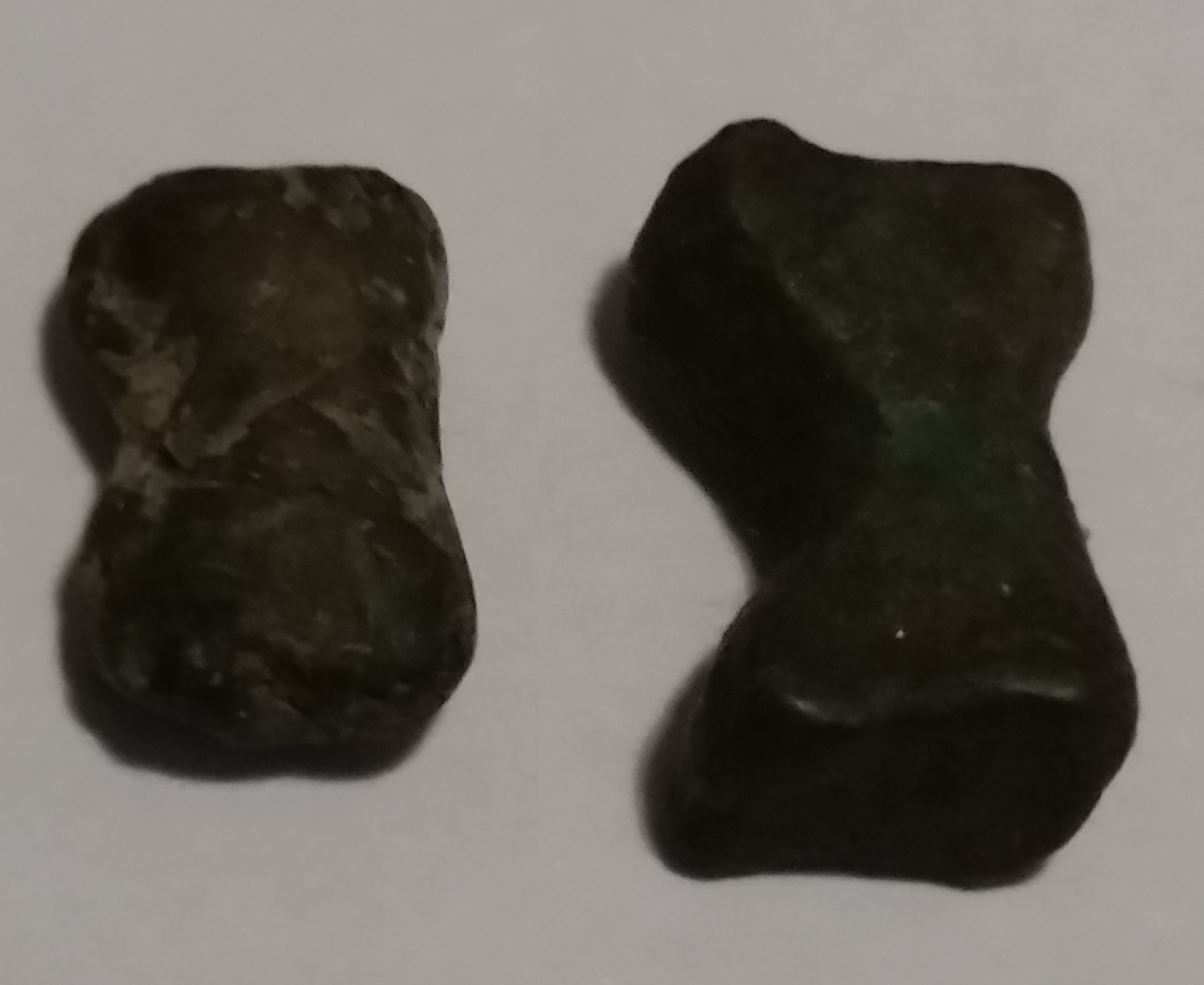
Two Damaru-shaped coins from the Gangetic Valley

In the post-Mauryan period a tribal society at Kosambi (modern Prayagraj district) made cast copper coinage with and without punchmarks. Their coinage resemble the damaru-drum. All such coinage has been attributed to the Kosambi. Many Indian museums, such as the National Museum, have these coins in their collections.

== In Tibetan Buddhism ==
In the Tibetan Buddhist tradition, the damaru is part of a collection of sacred implements and musical instrument was adopted from the tantric practices of ancient India. These reached the Himalayas from the 8th to 12th century, persisting in Tibet as the practice of Vajrayana flourished there, even as it vanished in the subcontinent of India.

=== Skull damaru ===
The skull (thöpa) damaru is made from a male and female skull bone or calvarium, cut well above the area of the ear, and joined at their apexes. Inside, male and female mantras are appropriately inscribed in gold. The skins are traditionally cured by burying them with copper and other mineral salts, and special herbal formulas for about two weeks. These are then stretched and applied to the two sides, giving the skins their familiar blue or green mottled appearance. A collar of simple brocade, or copper or silver, has a hand-hold, and is the site of attachment of the beaters, whose knit cover represents two eyeballs. The skulls are also carefully chosen for their attributes and source. After the Tibetan diaspora in 1960, they began to be manufactured in India and Nepal, with a continued degradation of quality. Today, India is no longer a source, and their creation and export from Nepal are banned because of the acquiring of human bone through illegal practices. One still does find occasionally those with painted skins and without the proper mantras or other characteristics.

The symbolism and energetic properties of the drums is extensive. These human skull damaru or chang te'u are used in a wide range of Vajrayana ritual, as a standard right hand accompaniment to the bell, held in the left hand. Usually used together as an accent or punctuation during various tantric practices, the drum can also keep time during entire passages. For the solo practitioner, it is an essential tool, while in larger assemblies, only the presiding Rinpoches and chant masters use them, in concert with the long horns (radung), short horns (gyaling), large cymbals (silnyen and rolmo) and large temple drums (lag-na).

=== Chöd drum ===
The Chöd drum (or chöda) is a specialized form of damaru. It is generally larger in circumference and has a more round shape than its smaller counterpart. The Chöd drum is used in the tantric practice of Chöd.

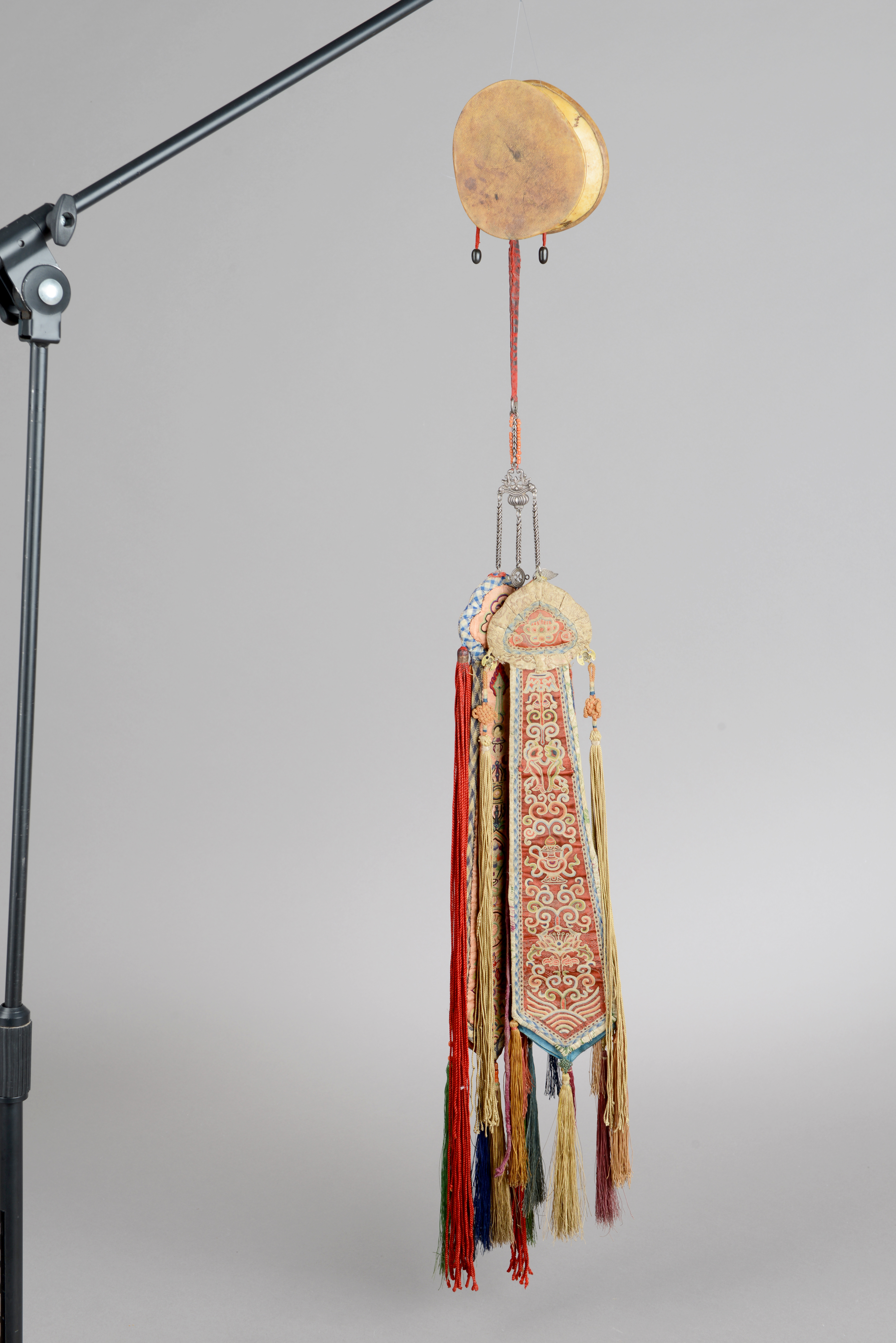
Drum damaru – the Asia and Pacific Museum in Warsaw

With no known antecedent, the chod is traditionally made of acacia wood (seng deng), though a variety of woods are acceptable, as long as the tree is not toxic and does not possess thorns or other negative attributes. Made as a one-piece, double-sided (two-headed) bell shape, size varies from 8 inches to 12 inches in diameter. Usually featuring only a thin veneer of varnish, so that the grain of the wood shows, they come from the common red (marpo), black (nakpo) or rare yellow (serpo) type of acacia, and are very occasionally painted with skulls, the eight charnel grounds, or other symbols. The waist or belt is traditionally made of leather, though often brocades are used. A set of mantras are traditionally painted on the interior of the drum prior to its skinning.

The pitch of the drum varies, and the tone may vary depending on conditions of dampness, temperature and so on. Played slowly, and methodically, the droning of the damaru accompanies the haunting melodies and chants of the chod ritual, which are accompaniments for the inner meditations and visualizations that are at the heart of this spiritual practice.

The above applies to the ideal manufacture of the damaru, and as still described in the definitive modern work, the "Mindroling Handbook of Vajrayana Implements". Those manufactured in India and Nepal are made of indeterminate and cheap woods, with painted skins, often no interior mantras, and altogether deviating from the many other essentials, as prescribed in technical literature such as the Mindroling Handbook. Such copies are now widespread and in use by Eastern monastics and Western students.

=== Chöpen ===
Damaru of all kinds are traditionally paired with a long sash or tail called a chöpen. The chöpen is attached to the end of the drum's handle so that it waves about while the drum is being played. They are most commonly made of brocade or silk using the colors of the tantric elements. On smaller damaru, the chöpen is usually found without adornment, but on chöd damaru, the tail will often feature several items which have been sewn onto the fabric. These adornments commonly include but are not limited to: a polished silver mirror or melong, a set of small bells, strips of tiger and/or leopard skin, one/more precious stones (i.e. dzi bead), and an unspecified amount of small brass trinkets.

== See also ==
- Dhadd – Musical instrument
- Dhyāngro – Musical instrument
- Kangling – Musical instrument
- Na – Musical instrument
- Udukai – Musical instrument
