= Banjhakri and Banjhakrini =

Shamanic deities of the Tamang people of Nepal

Creature information
- Grouping: Legendary creatures
- Similar entities: Yeti
- Family: Sun
- Folklore: Kirat

Origin
- Country: Nepal, Sikkim, Darjeeling, Kalimpong of India
- Habitat: Forest

Banjhākri and Banjhākrini are shamanic deities in the tradition of the Kirati people of Nepal and Sikkim, Darjeeling, and Kalimpong in India. They are a couple, and possibly different aspects of the same being. They are supernatural shamans of the forest. In the Nepali language, ban means "wilderness", jhākri means "shaman", and jhākrini means "shamaness". Banjhākrini is also known as Lemlema .

== Shamanic teachers ==
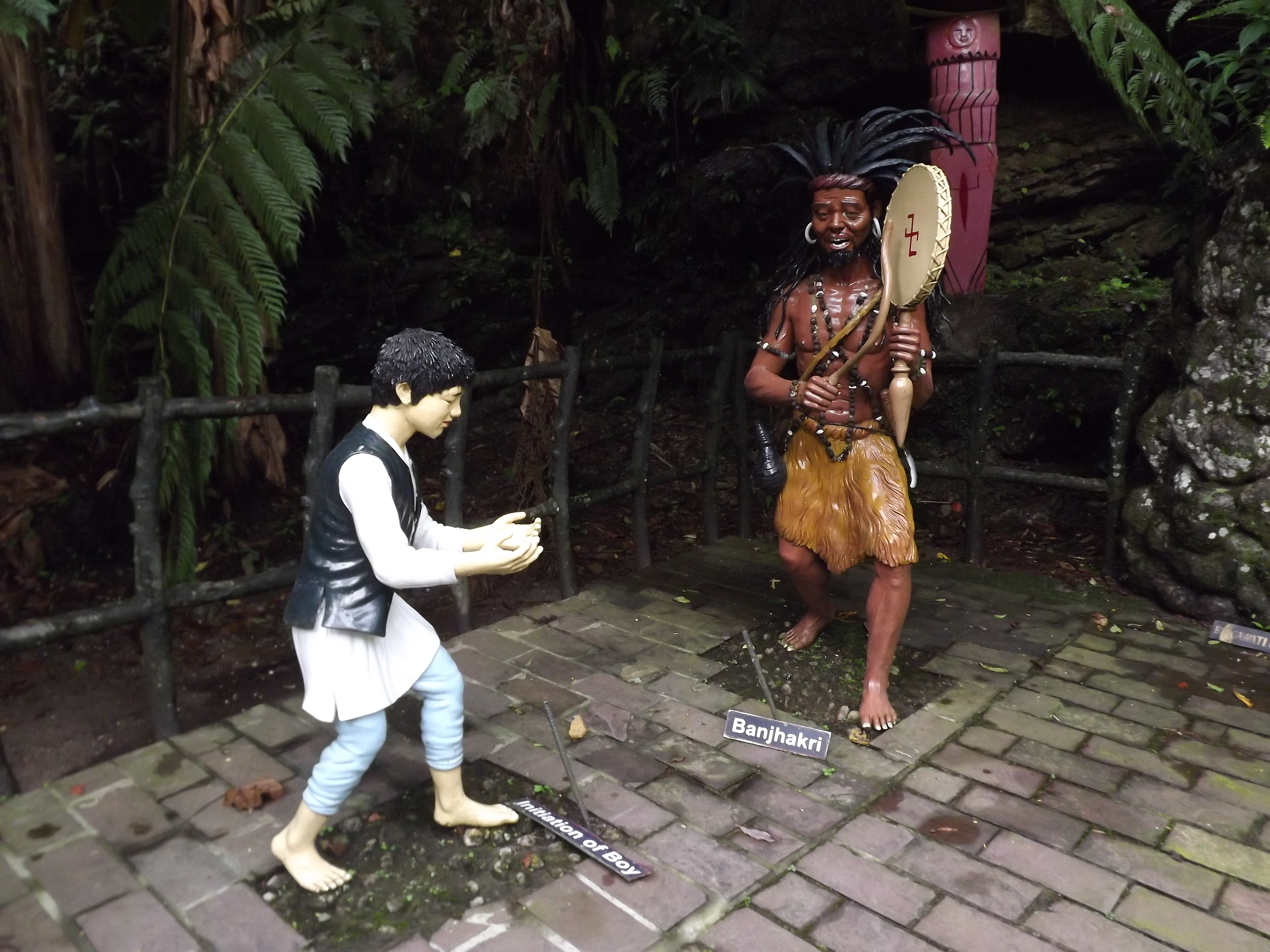
Banjhākri and his Disciple Statues at Banjhakri Falls and Energy Park in Gangtok, Sikkim, India

Banjhākri is a short, wild, simian trickster who is a descendant of the Sun. His ears are large and his feet point backward. Long, matted hair covers his entire body, except for his face and palms, and he plays a golden dhyāngro. The dhyangro is the frame drum played by Nepali jhākri.

Banjhākri finds human children who have the potential to be great shamans, and takes them back to his cave for training. There, the children are in danger of being eaten whole by Banjhākrini. Banjhākrini is both ursine and humanoid, with long hair on her head, long, pendulous breasts, and backward-pointing feet. She is usually described as bloodthirsty and brutal. She carries a symbolic golden sickle.

Although Banjhākri abducts boys (and, by some accounts, girls), he does not do so out of malice. He trains the children who pass Banjhākrini's initiation. When the children return home with their shamanic training, they can become more powerful than the shamans trained by people.

Like the yeti, Banjhākri and Banjhākrini can be seen in our world, and not just in the spirit world. However, only powerful shamans can see them. Although both Banjhākri and yeti are apelike, yeti are taller than humans, whereas Banjhākri is only about 1–1.5 metres (3–5 feet) tall.

One anthropologist has suggested that Banjhākri is a therianthrope: a humanoid who changes into a non-human animal form.

Some legends say that there are numerous ban-jhākri and ban-jhākrini. In any case, the shamans of Nepal regard the original Banjhākri as the founder of Nepali shamanism. Banjhākri is revered and celebrated as a teacher and as the god of the forest.

== See also ==
- Banjhakri Falls and Energy Park
- Chullachaki
- Churel
- List of hybrid creatures in mythology
- Shapeshifting
