= Banjhakri Falls and Energy Park =

Recreation centre and tourist attraction near Gangtok, Sikkim, India

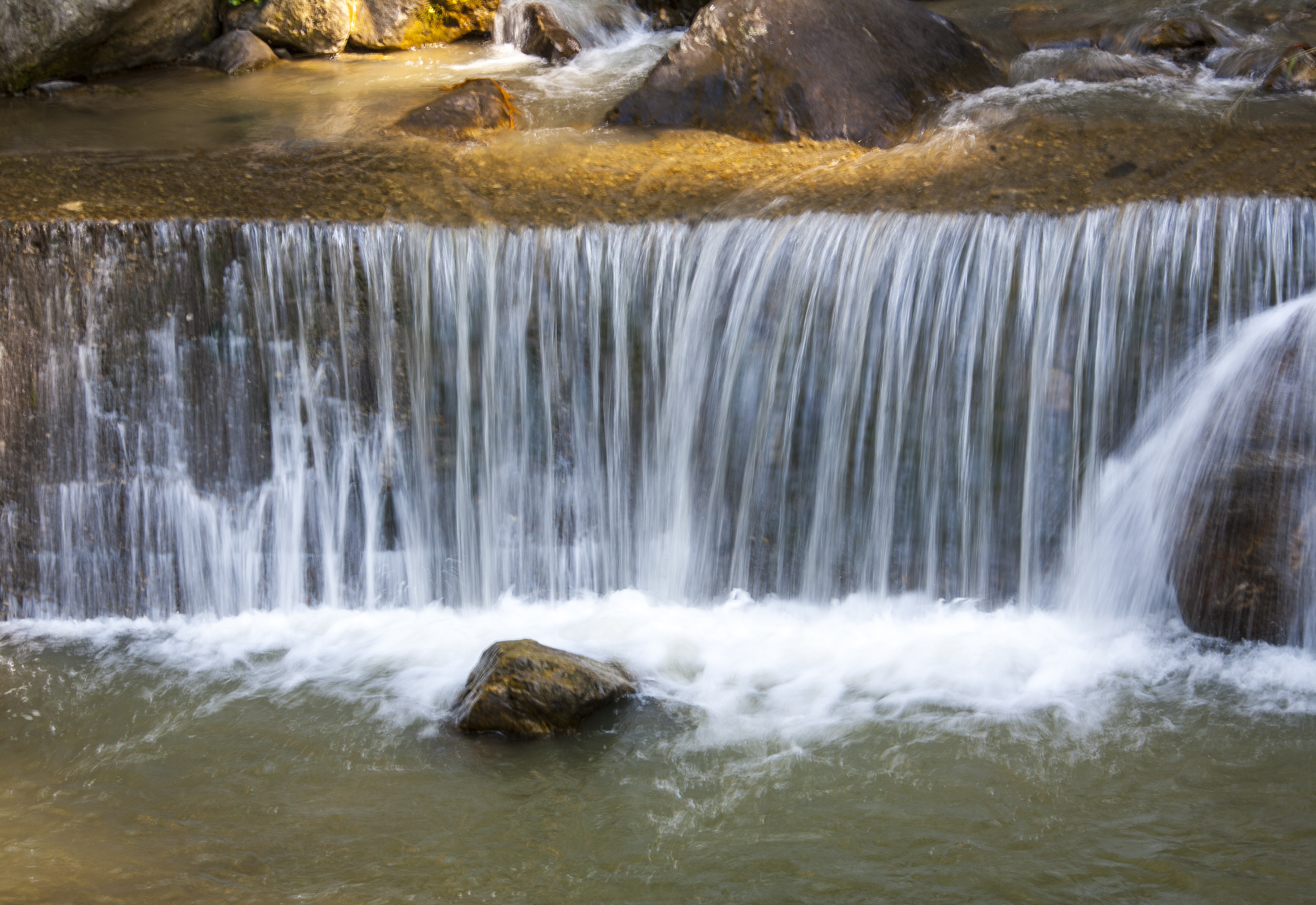
- Banjhakri Falls

- Location within Sikkim
- Location: Gangtok, Sikkim, India
- Coordinates: 27°21′03″N 88°36′13″E
- Total height: 100 ft (30 m)

The Banjhakri Falls and Energy Park is a recreation centre and tourist attraction near Gangtok, in the state of Sikkim, India. The park's statuary and other displays document the Ban Jhakri, or traditional shamanic healer who worships spirits living in caves around the falls. Ban means "forest", and jhākri means "healer".

The park is in a thickly forested part of Swastik, next to an army camp, about 7 kilometres (4.3 mi) from Gangtok on National Highway 31 to North Sikkim.

== Layout ==
Banjhakri Falls is a natural waterfall sourced from springs at higher elevation. The cascade is approximately 30 metres (98 ft) high. 2 acres (0.81 ha) of forestland were cleared and developed for the park. The theme park was conceived by Chief Minister of Sikkim Pawan Kumar Chamling, who had visited the falls during his visit to the Ranka Monastery on 28 September 2004. He intended to revive interest in the traditional shamanic beliefs of the people. Citizens were invited to suggest themes for the park. The park was consequently developed into an attraction that celebrated the shamanic traditions of the people of Sikkim.

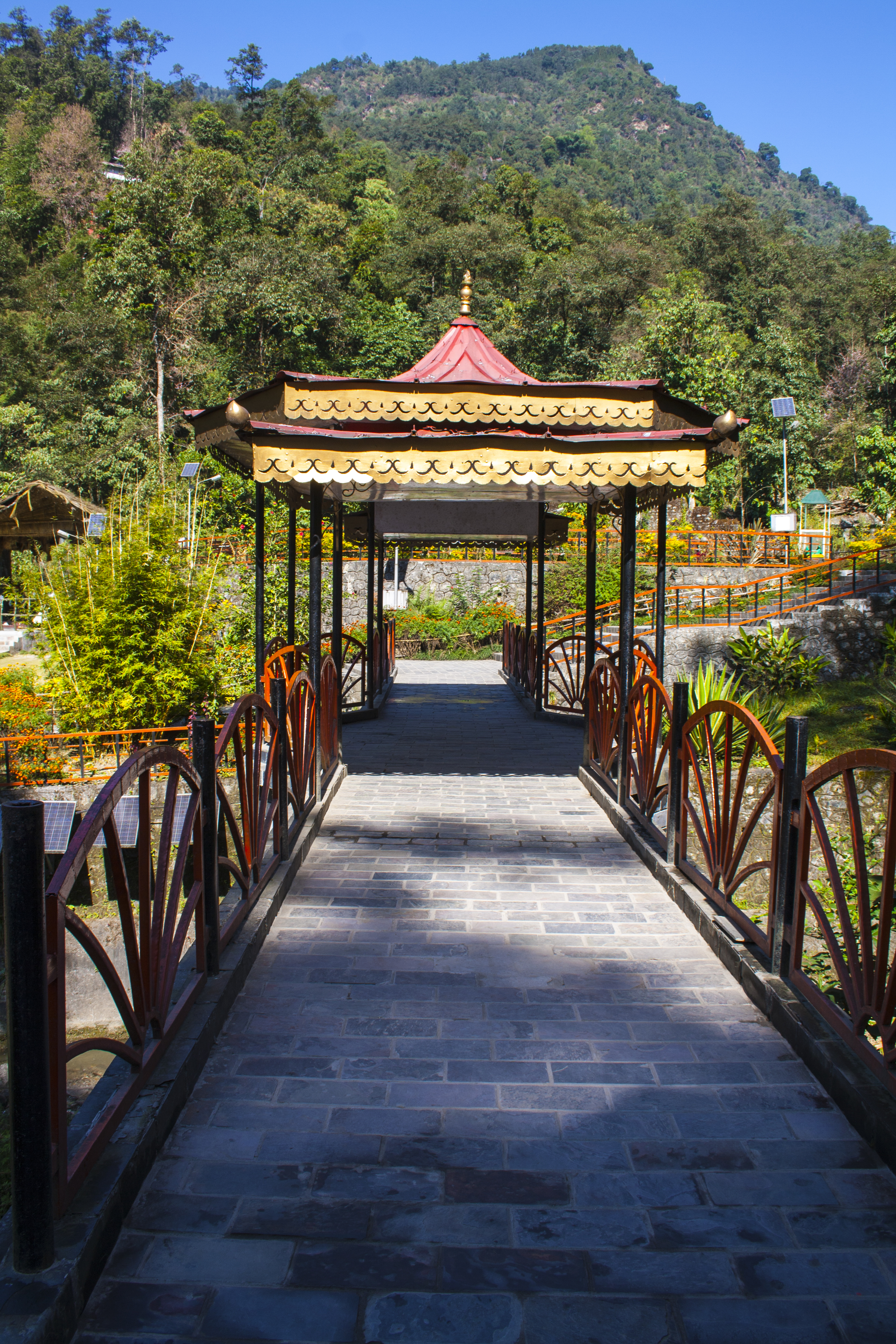
Park entrance
(November 2011)

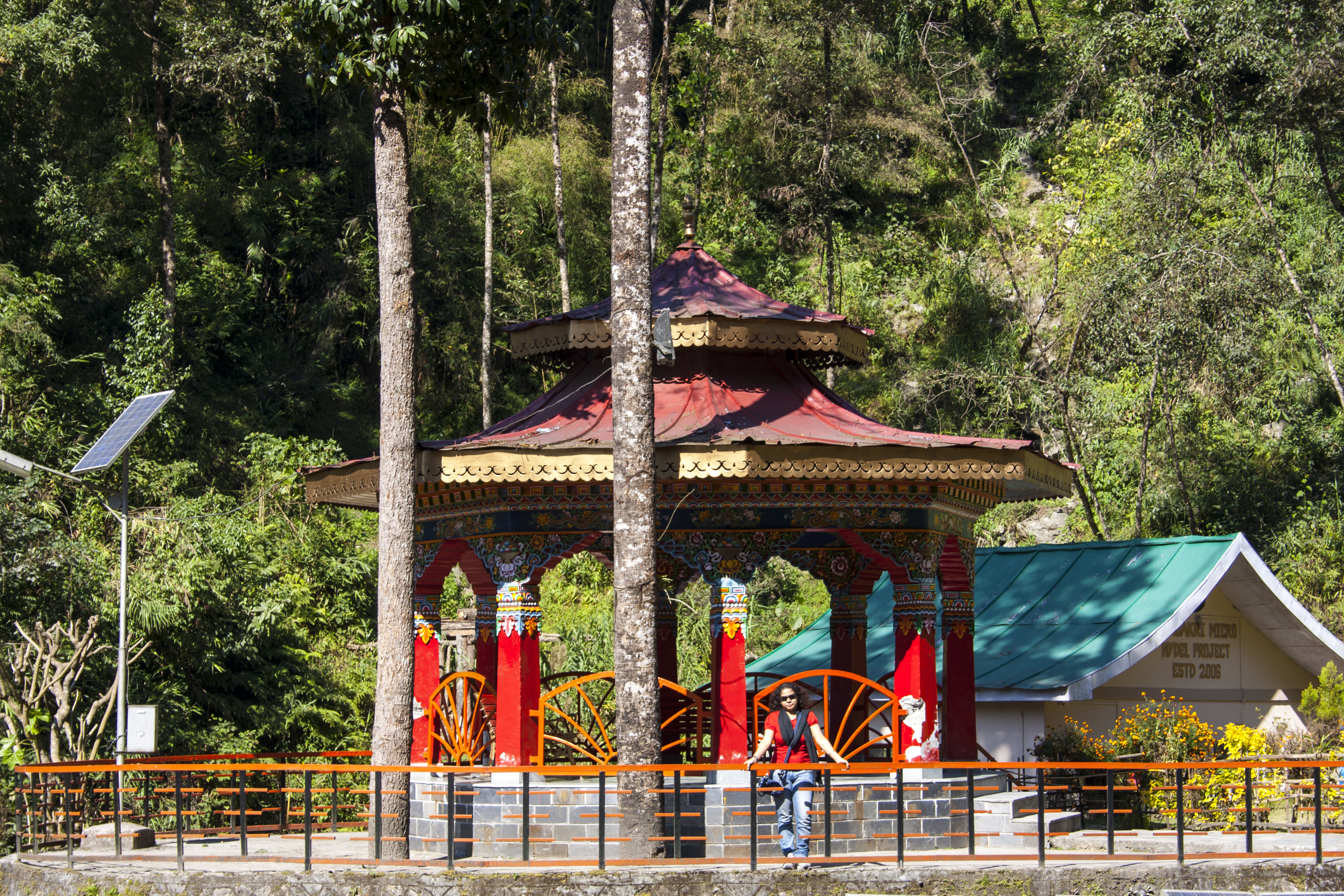
A gazebo in the park
(November 2011)

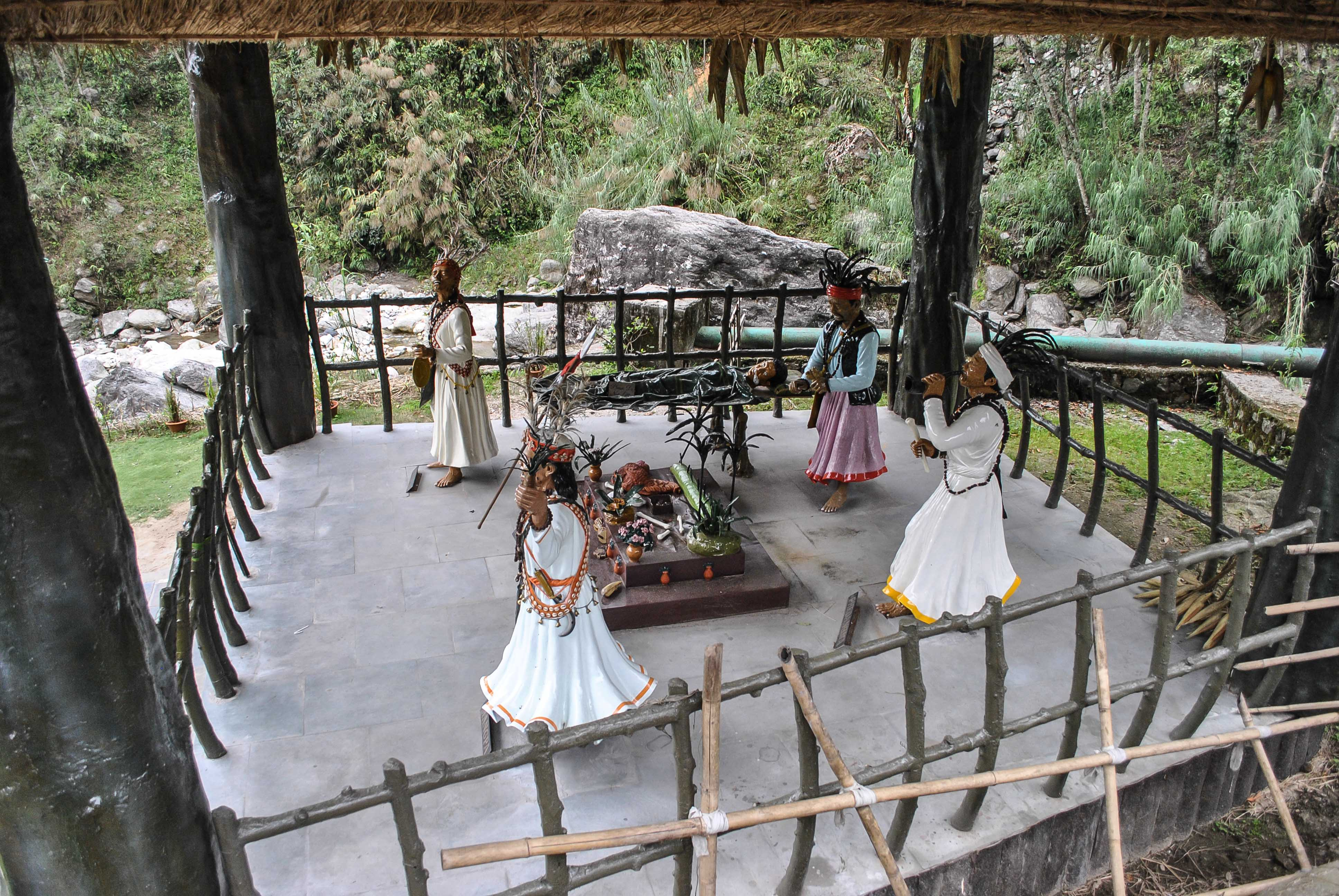
Statues of jhākri
(May 2010)

Among the park's attractions are an artificial lake with a dragon in the centre; gazebos; statues of jhākri; and statues of the ancestors of the Lyam Lymay, and Banjkari is Ancestors of Kirati people of Sikkim. Sculptures of Mangpa, jhākri, Bongthing, Phedangba, and Bijuwa are housed in thatched enclosures. Paved paths and footbridges wind through the landscaped garden, which is decorated with ornamental trees and flowers, such as ardesia, acer, poinsettia (Euphorbia pulcherrima), camellia, angelica, hydrangea, and tebuchinie.

Gazebos have been erected throughout the park. A museum hall curated by the Sikkim Rural Energy Development Agency (SREDA) has exhibits about renewable energy. The grounds also feature exhibits about topics in renewal energy, such as solar water heaters, solar-powered cars, energy drums, et al. The park is lit by solar-powered lamps.
