= Kaavi art =

Art created by Konkani people in India

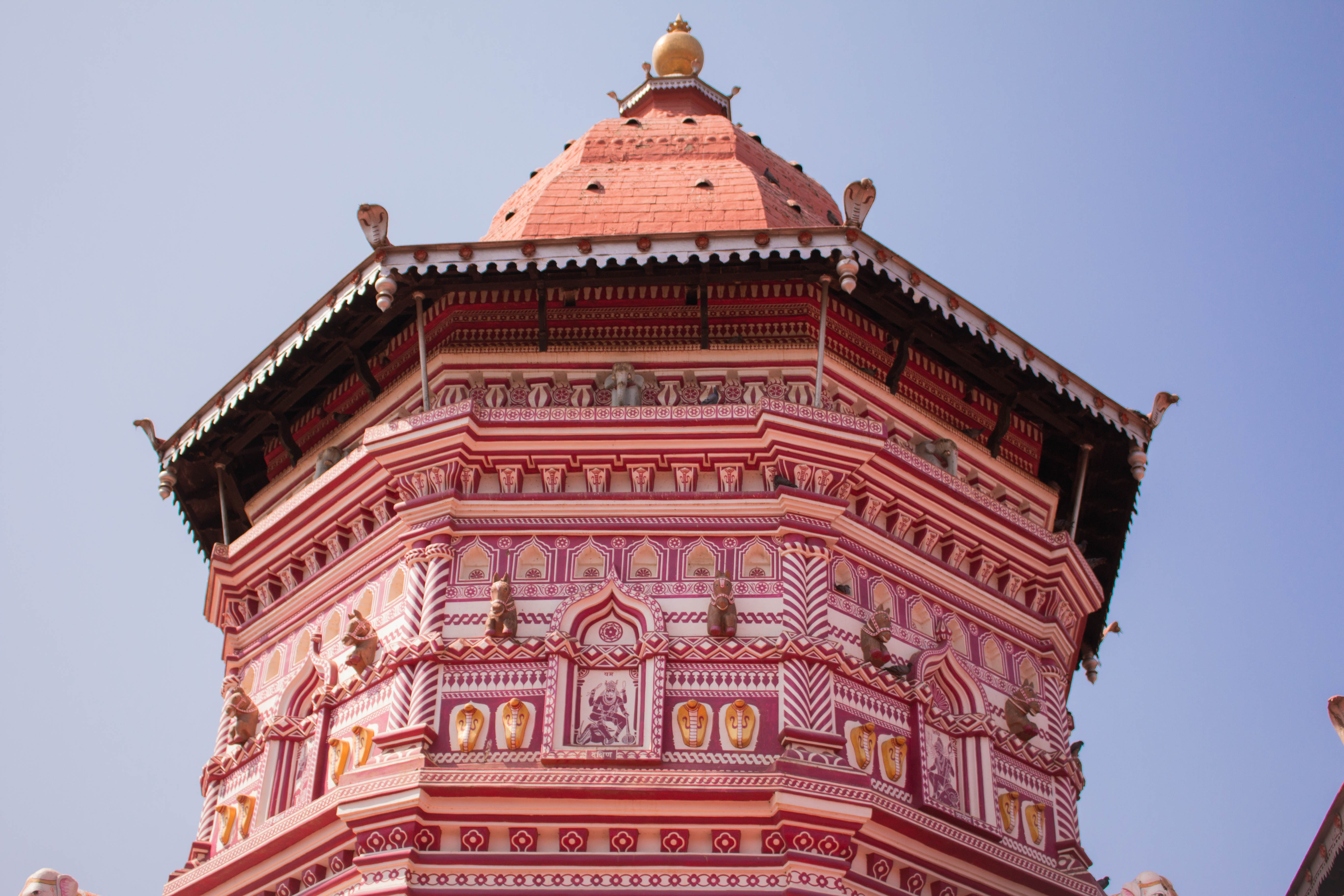
Kaavi murals at Lakshmi Narayan Mahamaya temple, Ankola Karnataka

Kaavi art is a traditional mural technique indigenous to the Konkan coast of India, especially in Goa, parts of coastal Maharashtra and Karnataka. It is distinguished by its use of a single reddish‑brown pigment, known locally as “kaav” (laterite red oxide), incised into a white lime‑plastered surface to create intricate motifs and murals in religious and secular buildings. Kaavi murals can also be seen in old houses, small shrines.

== Etymology ==
The term kaav in Konkani refers to the maroon‑red pigment derived from locally available laterite soil, while kalé means “art form.” Together, Kaavi Kalé denote the art of red‑oxide incised work on lime‑plastered walls.

== History ==
Kaavi art is believed to have originated around 400–600 years ago, possibly introduced by Saraswat communities migrating from the Saraswati plains to Goa. Its development was driven by the need for a durable decorative medium capable of withstanding the region’s high humidity and heavy monsoon rains, which made conventional painted murals prone to rapid deterioration.

== Technique ==
On the wet walls on which Kaavi pictures are to be etched, a buttery smooth mixture of lime and uramunji is smeared with a steel trowel. To cover larger areas, a wooden float is also employed. After an hour, engraving work commences. A well-trained Kaavi art mason can etch a small mural without any aids. For geometrical designs he employs rulers and compasses. Large and complicated motifs are first drawn on paper, perforated with pinholes and then traced on the wall by dusting the pinholes with dry lime. Kanthas or the steel bodkins of different sizes and dimensions are used for etching. The ridges, platforms and niches are decorated with rows of spirals, spades, semi-circles and curves. The V-shaped parallel bands are used for twin pseudo-pillars.

Artists first apply a white plaster made from shell‑lime, sand and jaggery to the architectural surface. Once this layer sets, a paste of finely ground laterite red oxide mixed with lime putty—known as the kaav layer—is spread to a butter‑like consistency and left to partially cure. While the kaav remains moist, designs are incised using steel bodkins (kanta), stencils, rulers and compasses, revealing the white plaster beneath and creating a striking two‑tone effect. The finished work is then cured by periodic misting and polishing with smooth river pebbles to enhance durability.

== Motifs and distribution ==
Common motifs include floral medallions, geometric patterns (circles, semi‑circles, hexagons), mythological figures and deities, as well as scenes from daily life. Kaavi art decorates temple interiors and exteriors, church walls, mosques, Jain basadis, small shrines and affluent residences. Notable examples survive in Pernem, Sattari, Canacona, Ponda and Morjim in Goa, as well as in Honavar and Kumta in Karnataka.

== Materials ==
The term Kaav (Devanagari:काव) in Konkani refers to Indian red pigment which is the only color used in this painting, is obtained from the laterite soil.

Artistically drawn and well executed, reddish brown murals against white sandblasted backgrounds are the specialties of Kaavi art. Snow white lime, obtained by burning seashells, and washed sand from river beds were mixed with jaggery and allowed to ferment for two weeks. The mixture is then hand-pounded to obtain a homogeneous substance, which hardens when applied to the walls.

== Decline and revival ==
By the late 20th century, Kaavi art had declined considerably, with traditional practitioners no longer actively practising the technique and many surviving murals lost through renovation, reconstruction and neglect. Research and documentation by art historian Dr. Krishnanand Kamat, who published studies on the art form, including Kaavi Kale (1993) and Kavi Art of Coastal Karnataka (1996), contributed to its early recognition and awareness. traditionalarchitecturejournal.com+1 A subsequent revival effort began in 2003 through the work of Dr. Janardhan Rao Havanje, an artist and researcher specialising in Kaavi art. Over more than two decades, Havanje has undertaken field research, documentation, restoration and awareness initiatives to sustain the traditional architectural craft. His decade-long research involved visits to more than 6,000 temples along India's western coast. He authored the research paper Kaavi Kalé: The Indigenous Architectural Ornamentation Technique of the Konkan Coast, India published in the Journal of Traditional Building, Architecture and Urbanism in 2020. The study examined the history, techniques, architectural applications and conservation methods of Kaavi art. traditionalarchitecturejournal.com His research has documented more than 800 sites across Karnataka, Goa and Maharashtra, identifying Kaavi work in temples, houses, churches, mosques, Jain shrines and commercial buildings. His investigations have also traced examples of the technique to 12th-century structures in Andhra Pradesh. Through restoration initiatives and training programmes, Havanje and a team of artists have undertaken conservation work at several heritage sites along the Konkan coast. His efforts have also included workshops, exhibitions and training intended to encourage the transmission of traditional techniques to younger generations. In 2016, heritage activist Heta Pandit and the Charles Correa Foundation initiated a documentation project covering 21 temples and four houses in Goa that retain Kaavi work. The project examined the architectural technique and its similarities to European sgraffito. Academic surveys, including those by Havanje and D'Souza, have further examined its materials, execution and conservation methods. Workshops, including those conducted at Goa's Museum of Christian Art, and initiatives to introduce Kaavi art into school curricula have also contributed to renewed interest in the tradition. Goa News - Times of India+1 Contemporary artists such as Janardhan Rao Havanje Sagar Naik Mule and Veena Srinivas, Ravi Gunaga have further popularised Kaavi art through public demonstrations and exhibitions. Kaavi works were showcased during events associated with the G20 in 2023 and at the UNESCO World Heritage Committee meeting in 2024, at Rashtrapati Bhavan, at Mangalore International Airport bringing wider national and international attention to the art form. Goa Travel News on Gomantak Times+1
