= Jhākri =

Shaman in Nepal and Northeast India

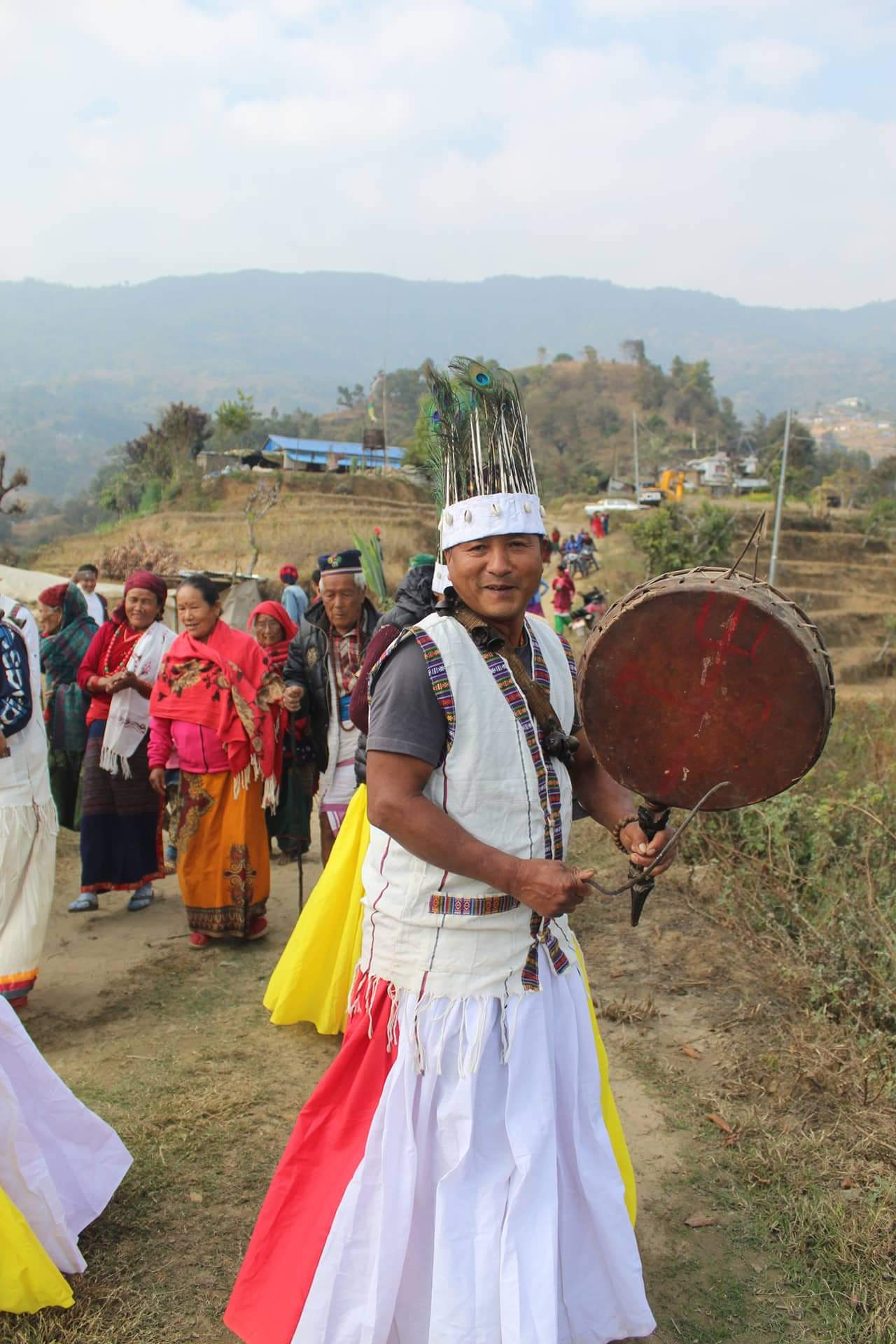
A Nepali jhākri with a dhyāngro, a traditional frame drum and dancing in their ritual song.

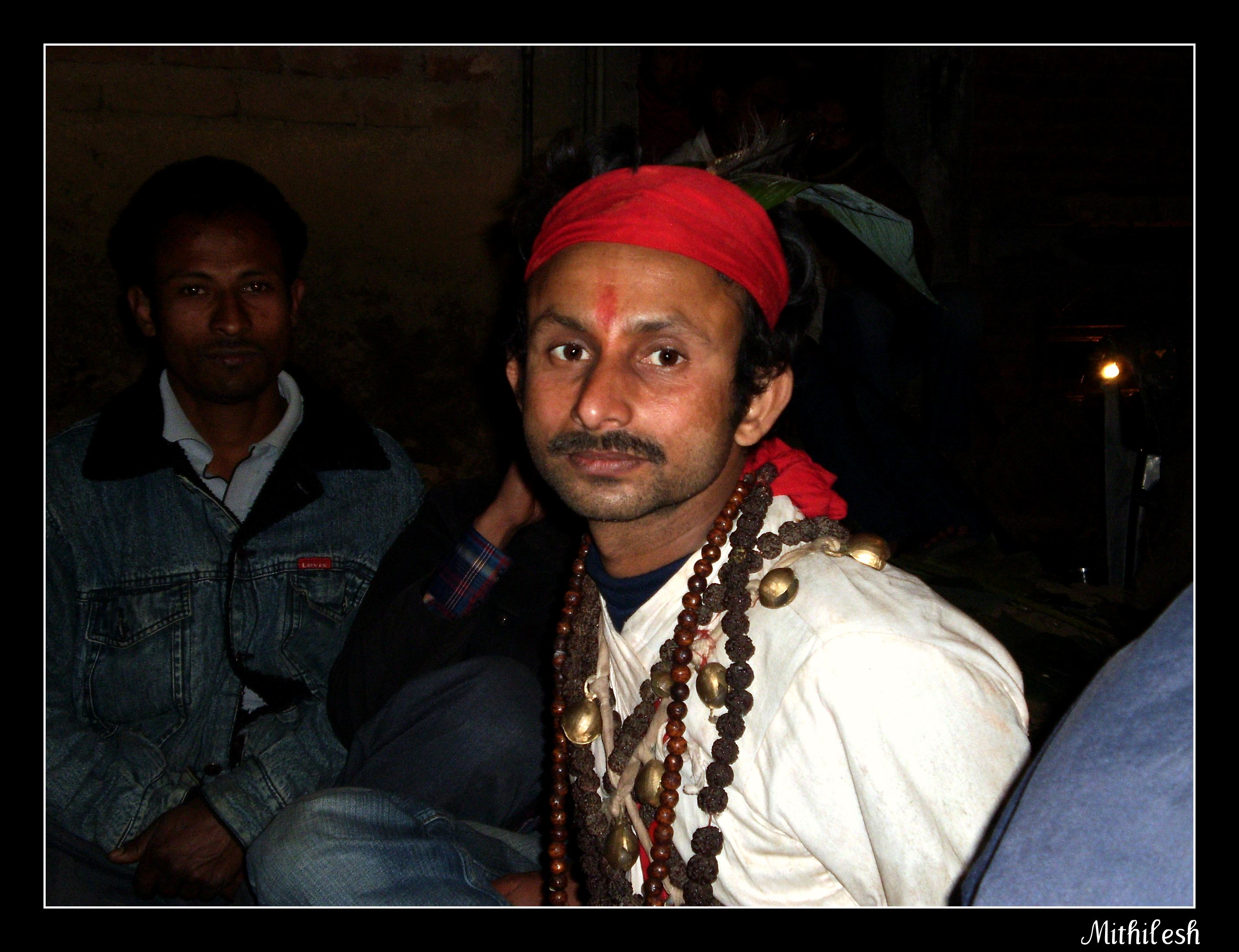
A jhākri in Kalimpong, West Bengal, India

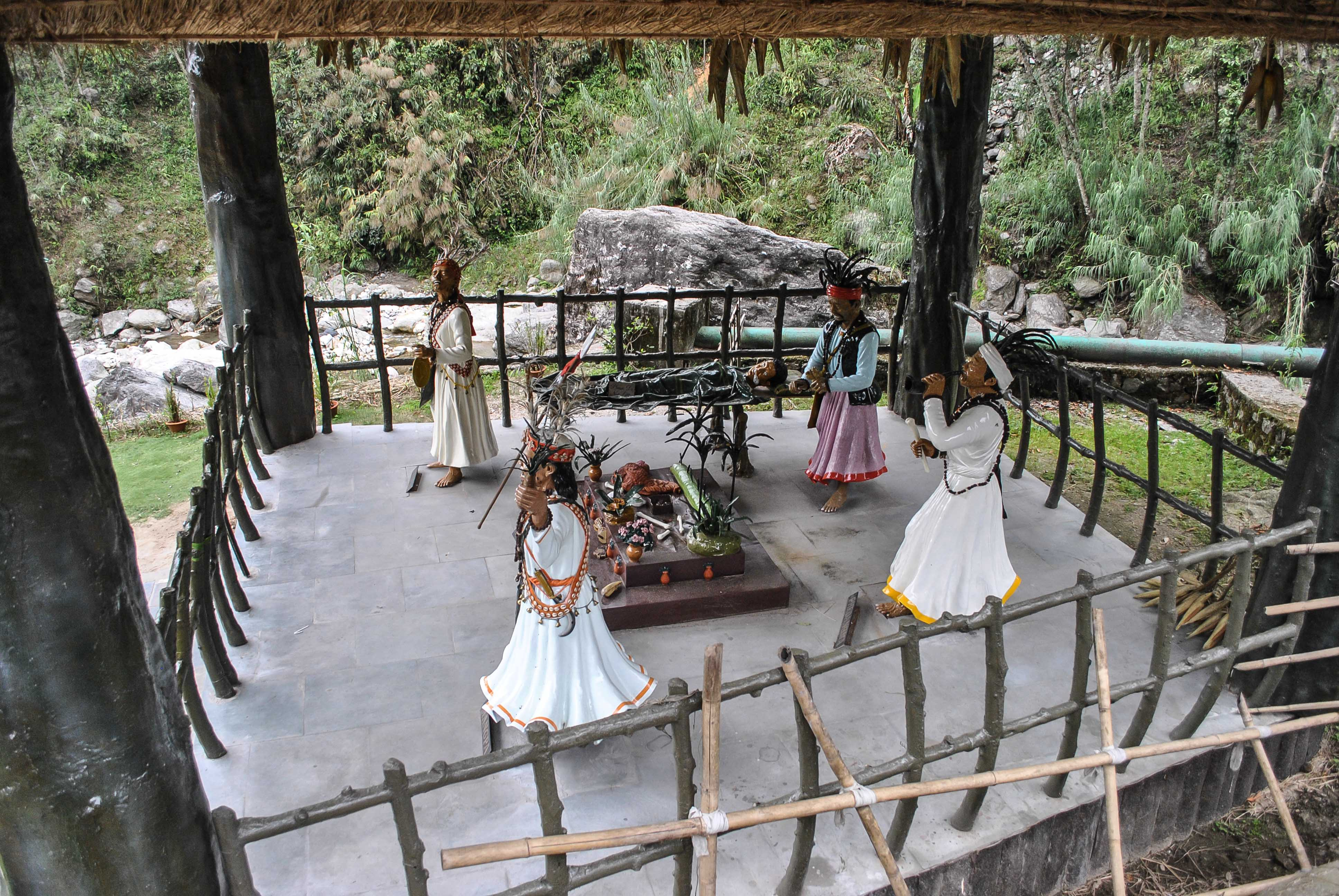
Statues of jhākri at Banjhakri Falls and Energy Park in Gangtok, Sikkim, India

Jhākri (Nepali: झाक्री) is the Nepali word for shaman or diviner. It is sometimes reserved specifically for practitioners of Nepali shamanism, such as that practiced among the Tamang people, Khas people, Gurung people and the Magars; it is also used in the Indian states of Sikkim and West Bengal, which border Nepal. The practice of using a Jhaakri as a channel or medium by a Hindu god or goddess to give solutions or answers to the questions of devotees is known as, "dhaamee (Nepali: धामी)" in Nepali.

Jhākri shamanism or dhaamee is practiced among numerous ethnic groups of Nepal and Northeast India, including the Limbu, Yakkha, Rai, Sunuwar, Sherpa, Tamang, Gurung, Magars, Lepcha and Khas. Belief in spirits is prevalent, hence also the fear of spirit possession. Some vernacular words form jhākri are phedangba in the Limbu language, Nakchhong, Mangpa/Bijuwa in Rai, and boongthing in Lepcha.

Jhākris perform rituals during weddings, funerals, and harvests. They diagnose and cure diseases. They are also known for performing a form of voluntary spirit possession, whereby they allow the supposed spirit of the dead to possess them for a brief time thereby allowing family members to communicate for a brief period of time. The practice is called "Chinta". Their practices are influenced by Tibetan Buddhism, Tantra, Mun, and Bön rites.

Mostly, Jhakri use pray items like dhyāngro, a traditional frame drum made up of animal leather banded in a hallow wood on both side, bells connected by rope. They use Mantra in Tibetan language or their own native language.

== See also ==
- Banjhakri and Banjhakrini, shaman deities of Nepal
- Banjhakri Falls and Energy Park, a tourist attraction in Northeast India, with statues of jhākri
