= Rolmo =

Musical instrument

The rolmo is a horizontal ritual cymbal used by Tibetan monks in Buddhist rites. It has a broad central boss and is struck vertically, in contrast to the Silnyen.

== See also ==
- Buddhist music
- Tibetan music
