= Kirat (disambiguation) =

The Kirat or Kirati people are indigenous ethnic groups of the Himalayas.

Kirat may also refer to:

- Kirat or Kiranti languages, the Sino-Tibetan languages of the Kirati
- Mahakiranti languages, a proposed Sino-Tibetan language branch
- Kirat Mundhum, the religion of the Kirati
- Kirat Autonomous State, an area of the Himalaya of ethnic Kirati people of Nepal in the eastern region
- Kirata, term in Sanskrit literature and Hindu mythology for various peoples who had territory in the mountains
- Kirata Kingdom, in Sanskrit literature and Hindu mythology refers to any kingdom of the Kirata people, who were dwellers mostly in the Himalayas
- Kirātārjunīya, epic poem in Sanskrit by Bhāravi
- Kirat (unit), 1/24 of a feddan, an Arabic unit of area
- Kirat Karo, the principle of honest living, a pillar of Sikhism

== People ==
- Bhatt Kirat, Sikh Brahmin bard in the court of Guru Arjan
- Kirat Babani (born 1922), Indian writer, journalist and progressive activist of Sindhi language and nation
- Kirat Bhattal (born 1985), Indian actress
- Kirat Singh (c. 1763–1835), the last Jat ruler of Gohad state in Madhya Pradesh, India (1803–1805)
