= Karun Thapa =

Nepali IT expert, film editor and 3D animator (born 1965)

- करुण थापा
- Karun Thapa
- Born: 1965/03/23; Beni, Myagdi district, Nepal
- Occupations: IT Professional, Film Editor, 3D Animator, Trainer, Lyricist, Consultant, Coach
- Years active: 1986–Present
- Spouse: Tsering Lama (Sareeta Thapa)
- Children: Purnima Thapa, Swikriti Thapa, Suhanee Thapa

Karun Thapa (Nepali: करुण थापा) born on 23 March 1965) is a Nepali IT expert, film editor, 3D animator, trainer, a well-known lyricist and Ghazal writer. Karun is known for his technological contribution to Nepali IT and media industry. He has contributed by introducing Devanagari fonts in computers, introducing AVID Digital Film Editing system in Nepal and introducing 3D animation in Nepal.

== Early life and education ==
Thapa was born in 1965 (BS 2022) in Beni to a Hindu family. Karun studied till class 3 in his village school called Dhaulagiri School. He stood first in Myagdi district in a scholarship exam, got scholarship and went to Budhanilkantha School in Kathmandu. After completing high school from Budhanilkantha School, Karun went to Amrit Science College (ASCOL) to complete his intermediate in science and graduation in Computer Science from Priyadarshini College.

== Career ==
Karun Thapa started his career a software developer and a computer trainer. He started making business software for hotels, banks, business companies, etc. and started a computer training institute in 1988.

Thapa was the first person to develop Nepali (Devanagari) font on Apple IIe and Apple Macintosh computers. UNESCO nominated Thapa to participate in the Asian Federation of Natural Language Processing (AIT, Bangkok) 1992 and the Asia Pacific Regional Seminar on Information Technology and Newspaper Publishing in Madras (from 11–14 April 1995) in recognition to the font development done by him. He also developed Limbu (Srijunga) Script and Rai (Wambule Script) in 1994. He is mentioned in the history section in a book called History, Culture and Customs of Sikkim (J. R. Subba). Thapa introduced 3D animation in Nepal and he is the first 3D animator in Nepal.

Karun Introduced AVID film editing and digital cinema in Nepal.

== Filmography ==
Year	Title	FILM EDITOR	LYRICIST	OTHER ROLES
1995	Ragat	Yes	No	Animator
1996	Shankar	Yes	No	Animator
1996	Rakshak	Yes	No	Animator
1996	Siundo	Yes	Yes	Animator
1996	Bihani	Yes	Yes	Animator
1997	Sagun	Yes	Yes	Animator
1999	Auntha Chhap	Yes	No	Animator
1999	Gaajal	Yes	No	Animator
1999	Anaath	Yes	Yes	Animator
1999	Laxman Rekha	No	Yes	Animator
1999	Aago	No	Yes	Animator
1999	Dulha Raja Dulahi Rani	No	Yes	Animator
2000	Malai Maaf Garideu	Yes	Yes	Animator
2000	Doman	Yes	Yes	Animator
2001	Siundo Ko Sindoor	Yes	Yes	Animator
2001	Afno Ghar Afnai Manchhe	Yes	Yes	Animator
2001	Mero Hajur	Yes	Yes	Animator
2001	Mamaghar	Yes	Yes	Animator
2001	Dulahi	No	Yes	
2001	Superstar	No	Yes	Animator
2001	Bhai Tika	Yes	No	Animator
2001	Kahin Milan Kahin Bichhod	Yes	No	Animator
2001	Ke Bho launa ni	Yes	No	Animator
2001	Dhukdhukee	No	No	Animator
2001	Kasto Saino	Yes	No	Animator
2002	Army	No	No	Animator, Actor
2002	Malati	Yes	No	Animator
2002	Mohani Lagla Hai	Yes	No	Animator
2004	Lakshya	Yes	No	Animator
2006	Alpa Biram	No	No	Technical Consultant

== Awards ==
=== Winner ===
Year	Awards	Category	Film/Album
1998	Geetanjali Cine Awards	Best Editor	Film Sagun
1998	Geetanjali Cine Awards	Best Lyricist	Film Sagun
2002	Dabur Nepal 1 Motion Picture Award	Best Lyricist	Film Bhannai Sakina
2003	Mann Dukhyo re Unko	Best Lyricist	ALBUM - Hits FM Nominated
2006	Image Awards - Nominated	Best Song	Film Kartavya

== Achievements ==
=== Honours ===
Year	Awards	Organization
2007	Award for Development of Film Editing Avid Technology in Nepal	Nepal Film Producers' Association
2009	Felicitation for introducing 3D Animation Technology	Nepal Academy of Fine Arts
2011	Honour for introducing 3D Animation and IT in Nepal	ICT Association of Nepal
2011	Honour for Introducing Digital Cinema and First Digital Editor in Nepal	CG Digital Film Awards
2014	Felicitation for Contribution to Ghazal Lyrics	International Nepali Ghazal Forum
2014	Felicitation developing Limbu Script (Srijunga)	Kirat Yakthung Chumlung
2014	Felicitation by the Prime Minister of Nepal in presence of the President of Nepal for serving CIAA in Audio Visual Medium	CIAA
2014	Letter of Honour for serving as a Film Editor for more than 20 years and introducing Digital Film in Nepal	Nepal Film Technician's Association
2016	Felicitation by the Hon. President of Nepal for serving a Jury for National Film Award provided by the Govt of Nepal	Nepal Film Development Board

== Served as Jury Member ==
=== Jury Member for the following ===
Year	Award Ceremony or Competition	Nominate/Award
2000	San Miguel Music Video Award	Best Music Video
2006	Crity Advertising Awards (organizer: Advertising Association of Nepal)	Best TVC - Best Art Direction
2007	Crity Advertising Awards (organize: Advertising Association of Nepal)	Best Jingle - Best Camera TVC
2008 2017	Crity Advertising Awards (organizer: Advertising Association of Nepal)	Best Edited - Best Animated TVC
2007	Jury Member, Best 2D/3D Animation	Pentasoft
2010	Jury Member, Best Animated Short Film Competition	Maya Academy
2011	Jury Member, Short Film Festival	Nepal Army (Audio Visual)
2012	Jury Member, Best Music Video Editing/Special Effects in Music Videos	Image Channel Tuborg Image Awards 2012
2013	Jury Member	International Nepali Ghazal Competition
2013	Jury Member, Best Music Video Editing	Image Channel Tuborg Image Awards 2013
2014	Anti-Corruption Video Competition	CIAA
2014	Jury Member, CG Kamana Film Awards	Kamana Publication
2014	NCELL App Camp - Mobile App Competition and National Speaker	NCELL App Camp
2015	Jury Member, 8th NEFTA Film Awards, Qatar	Nepal Film Technicians' Association
2015	Jury Member, Grand Finale Judge, Ncell App Camp	NCELL App Camp
2016	Jury Member, National Film Award, Nepal Government	Film Development Board Govt of Nepal
2016	Jury Member, CG Kamana Film Award 2073	Kamana Publications
2017	Jury Member, CG Kamana Film Award 2074	Kamana Publications
2017	Jury Member, 5th International Nepalese Artists Society (INAS) AWARD	INAS
2017	Jury Member, Nepal Motion Picture Association (NEMPA) AWARD	Nepal Motion Picture Association
2018	Jury Member, Film Artists' Association of Nepal (FAAN) AWARD 2074	Film Artists' Association of Nepal
2018	Jury Member, CG Kamana Film Award 2075	Kamana Publications
