= Rajkarnikar =

Caste in Kathmandu Valley, Nepal

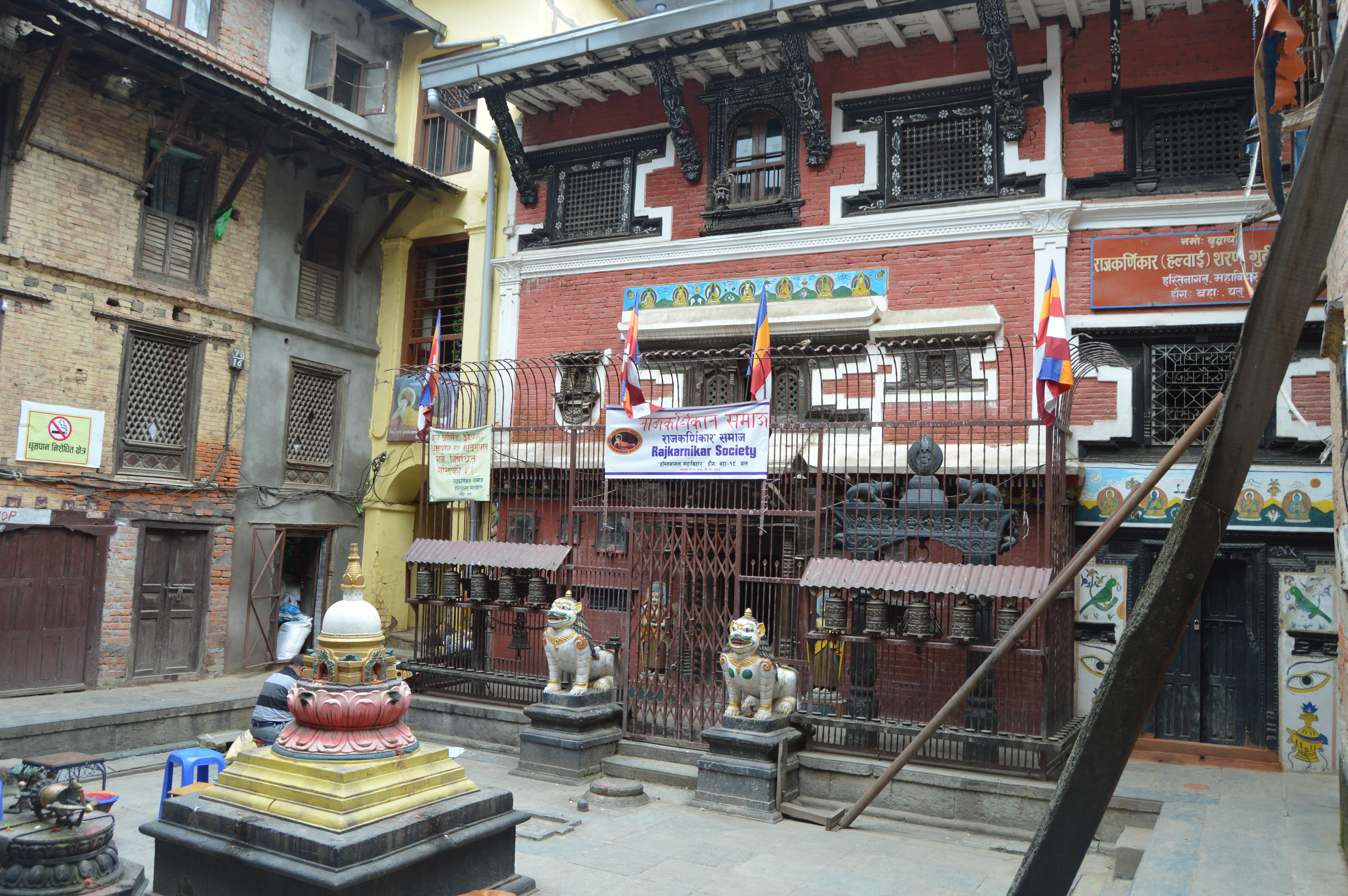
Rajkarnikar Agan Chhen at Hastinagal Mahavihar.

Rajkarnikar (Devanagari: राजकर्णिकार) are a newar clan of confectioners and sweet makers situated in Kathmandu Valley, in Nepal.

== Etymology ==
Rajkarnikars in Nepal are found mostly in Yen or Kathmandu Valley, over the regions of Kathmandu, Bhaktapur and Lalitpur (Patan in Nepali; Yala in Nepal Bhasa ). In 2011, their population was 83,000. Around 60,000 still reside in rural areas, and around 20,000 in urban areas. They speak Nepal Bhasa.

== Traditional Occupation ==
The Rajkarnikar community, by tradition, specializes in confectionery. They are entrusted with significant religious responsibilities, which include the preparation of traditional sweets such as various Maris, confections, and other sweet delicacies.

Every six years, the entire clan engages in the Samyak Mahadan festival in Yala through the preparation of confections for deities and devotees alike.

== Culture ==
Traditionally, in the caste system, they follow Newar Buddhism.

Their culture, traditions, religions, beliefs and rooted to Asia, Tibet , and Nepal.

The worshiping of Kumari, Taleju Bhawani, Ganesh, Harati Ajima, Aakash bhairav, and Bhin Dyo is one of major worshipping for Halwai people.

'They also believe in worshipping ancestors and believe in continued existence of life. They celebrate festivals, such as Yenya Puni, Yomari Punhi, Janbahadyah Salegu, Pahanchaare and perform pilgrimage during the month of Gunlaa.

== Social status ==
In their capacity as community food providers, they are also tasked with the preparation of confectionery and baked goods. These items are produced for all festive occasions and celebrations, including weddings and births.

== See also ==
- Nepal Mandal
- Newar Caste System
- Caste System in Nepal
- Yenya
- Akash Bhairava
- Yalamaber
