= Yele Sambat =

Lunar calendar

Yelam Sambat (Devanagari: येलम संबत् ) is the lunar calendar used by the Kirat community of Nepal. The Yelam Sambat calendar is named after the first Kirat king Yalambar. It is called Yele Dong by the Rai, Yele Thoche by the Sunuwar, Yele Naamsam by the Yakkhas, and Yele Tangbe by the Limbus.

It is said that this calendar started when the Kirat king Yalambar defeated the Gopal dynasty in the Kathmandu Valley. The Yele Sambat calendar begins on 15 January. This new year day is also celebrated as Maghe Sankranti in Nepal when people eat sweet potato and various kinds of yams and sel roti.

On 15 November 2009, Subas Chandra Nemwang, Chairperson of the Constituent Assembly (CA) stressed the need for the Government of Nepal to recognize Kirant Yele Sambat and ensure that it would be included in the constitution as annex. On 15 January 2010, the Government of Nepal stated that it would formally recognise Yele Sambat.

== History ==
According to Gopal Vamsawali, 32 Kirat kings ruled the Kathmandu valley for 1963 years and 8 months. The Kirat rule ended and the Licchavi rule was started by Jaya Varma in Saka Sambat 107.78 years of time period is added to convert Saka Sambat into AD, i.e., Saka Sambat 107 + 78 years = 185 AD. The Kirat kings ruled for 1963 years and 8 months. Deducting 185 from 1963 years and 8 months = 1779.8 BC, which is the starting ruling year of the first Kirat king Yalambar. In 2018, adding 1779.8 BC and 2017 AD, the Yele Sambat year comes out to be 3797 years and 8 months.

== See also ==
- Kirati people
- List of Kirati kings
