= Khuwalung =

Sacred rock in Province No. 1 of Nepal

- खुवालुङ (Nepali)
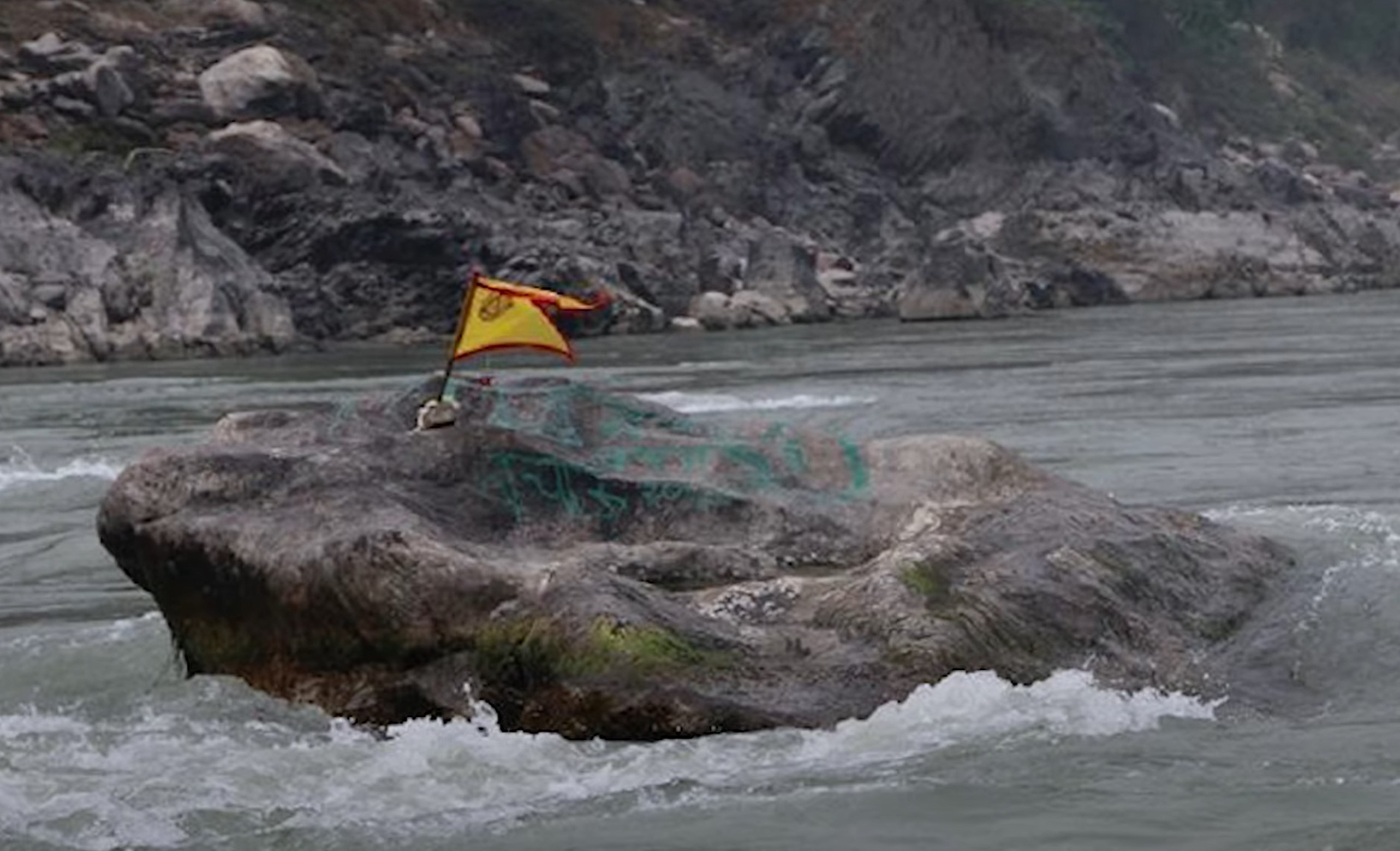
- Khuwalung rock in the Saptakoshi river, with the Kirat flag

- Location within Koshi Province Location within Nepal
- 26°54′35.74″N 87°9′43.275″E
- Type: Cultural, religious
- Location: Koshi Province, Nepal
- Nearest city: Belaka Municipality

Khuwalung (Nepali: खुवालुङ) is a rock in the Saptakoshi river of Nepal sacred to the Kirati people. The rock lies at the confluence of Dudh Koshi, Arun, and Tamor rivers, near the Belaka municipality of Udayapur district. It is considered as one of the holiest site of the Kirati people. The name of the rock is uttered in the beginning and ending of every Kirat religious ritual.

== Etymology ==
The exact meaning of the name of the rock is not known. However, according to the speculations of various cultural experts, the name of the rock may translate to 'a rock above water', 'a rock in the way', 'a rock in the border', or 'a plate like rock'.

== Geography ==
The rock is located at the confluence of Dudh Koshi, Arun and Tamur rivers. The confluence of three rivers is known as Triveni in Nepali and is often considered a holy spot in Kirati as well as other Dharmic religions. The spot also forms the border of Bhojpur, Dhankuta and Udayapur districts of Koshi Province of Nepal.

== Mythology ==
The rock is sacred to various communities of the Kirat culture such as Rai, Limbu, Yakkha, Lohorung, etc. The rock is mentioned in Mundhum, the holy scripture of Kirat people and described the origin of the Kirat people. Kirati people revere natural entities such as rivers, lakes, streams, mountains, and hills.

According to oral traditions, the ancestors of Kirati people are said to enter the eastern Nepal from present–day China, many years ago. However, they did not enter from the northern region of Nepal and instead enter present–day India first following the Brahmaputra River and reached their present homeland in present–day Koshi Province of Nepal through southern region of Nepal. They are said to follow the Saptakoshi river. On their way, they reached at Khuwalung. According to Mundhum, the region north of Khuwalung was considered a holy land. People who had committed sin or were impure could not cross the spot. Khuwalung only permitted pure people to go further north. An impure person could pass only after they offered the blood of an animal and purified their body and mind and asked for the way.

In Mundhum, there is a story of three brothers explaining the origin of major ethnic groups Mukubung was the eldest, Harkabung the middle and Riblabung the youngest were three brothers. The three brothers reached the Khuwalug rock and the path to the north was closed. Mukubung sacrificed a red-vented bulbul and offered its blood to the rock and passed through the rock. He migrated to the northern most part and Bhotiya people are said to be descended from him. Harkabung cut the pinky finger of a little girl, who was with him, and offered the blood and passed through the rock. He moved to the middle hilly region and Kirati people are said to be descended from him. His sons further migrated to various places of eastern Nepal and formed the various clans of Rai ethnic group. Riblabung, however could not offer anything to the rock and went south. He is considered the ancestor of the Tharu people of eastern Nepal.

According to Mundhum, the rock is said to have disappear inside the Koshi river after the sinful activities increased in the holy land. The Kirati people considered the rock as the mythical Khuwalung rock and revere the rock as a religious site.

== Controversy ==
On 20 February 2021 (8 Falgun 2077 BS), the-then prime minister KP Sharma Oli announced starting water jet route along the Koshi river, in a speech in Biratnagar. In that speech, Oli announced that a stone in Saptakoshi needed to be broken down using a crane, to facilitate the way. It was later found that the rock Oli had mentioned was Khuwalung rock. After the speech, the Kirat community and locals started a phased protest. Various protest were also conducted near the rock. Prominent litterateur Rajan Mukarung formed a committee named 'Khuwalug Sarokar Samiti' in Kathmandu and conducted protest through the committee.

== In arts and literature ==
On 26 February 2019, singer Janam Thulung released a song titled Khuwalung Khula. The song presented the story of the rock. The song was written by Khuksang Khambu and was sung and composed by Janam Thulung.

Cultural anthropologist Bhagiraj Chamling compiled a book titled Khuwalung: Ek Dhunga, Ek Badapatra. The book was published in March 2022. The book contains the mythology of Khuwalung in various Rai languages.

In July 2022, a play titled Khuwalung: Dhunga ko Bato was performed in the Mandala Theatre in Kathmandu. The play was written by Rajan Mukarung and directed by Kiran Chamling Rai. It was performed for a month from 22 July 2022 to 14 August 2022. The play depicted the origin story of Kirati people, their customs and traditions, and the importance of the rock in Kirati religion.

== See also ==
- List of individual rocks
