= Birupakshya =

Form of Lord Shiva

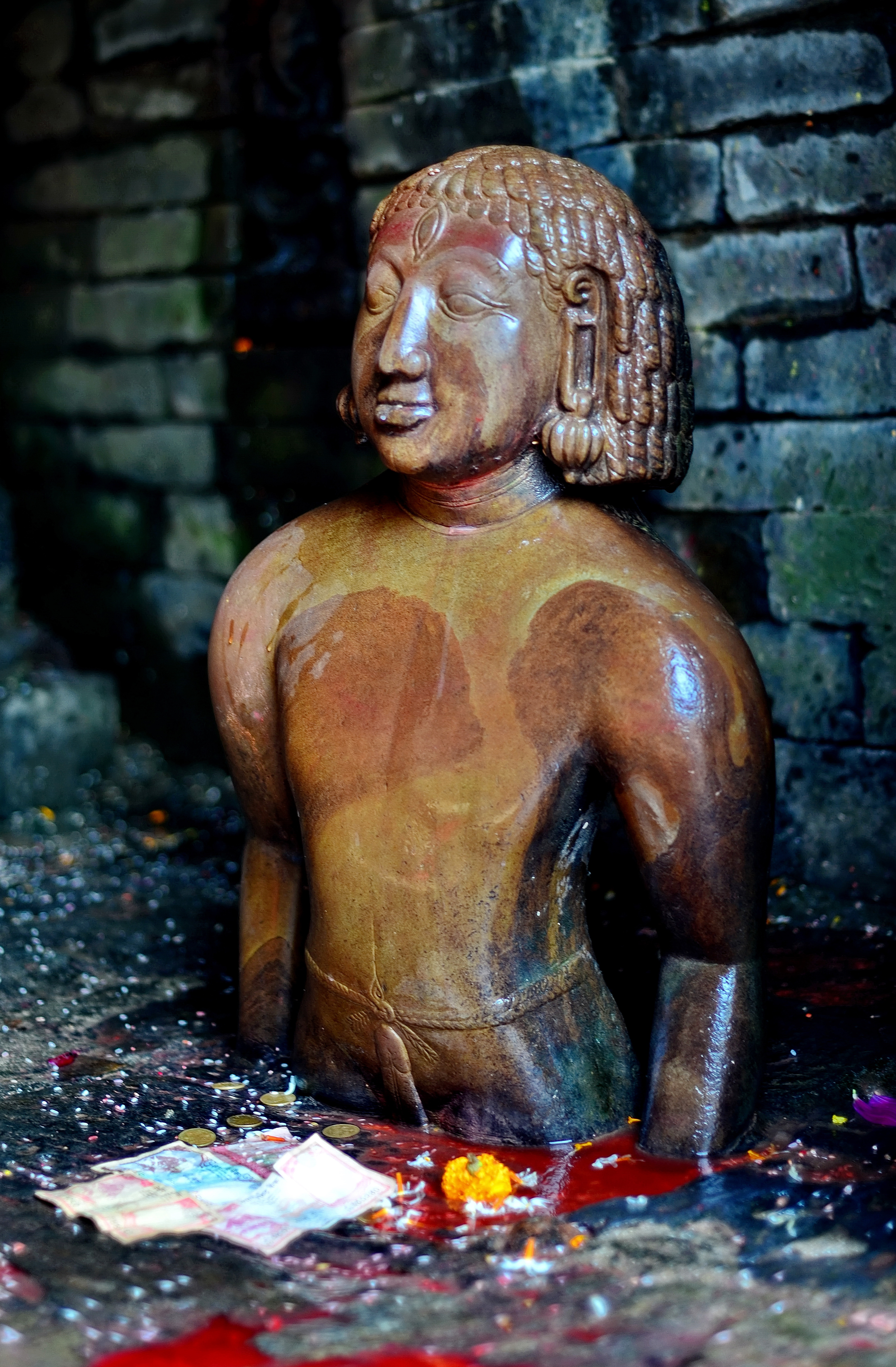
Birupakshya's statue near the Pashupati Aryaghat in 2021

Birupakshya is the holy god of Kirat people located in Kathmandu erected by Kirati kings of ancient Nepal, believed to be an ancestor. Kirat people are diverse and therefore their beliefs and deities vary. Birupakshya is also worshipped in South India as Virupaksha.

An icon of Virupaksha is located in the east of Pashupatinath Temple in the right bank of Bagmati river. Half of the body of Virupaksha lies inside ground and another half above. The statue is believed to be emerging out slowly. It is believed that the world will be destroyed when the whole statue emerges. Virupaksha is also called kali because his full emergence will end the Kali Yuga.

== Mythology ==
There are various legendary stories related to Virupaksha originating from Puranas and Mahapuranas. [3] According to one legend, Virupaksha is a god of the Kirat people, and the statue was established by the Kirati people of ancient Nepal. His statue is believed to be buried due to the earthquake in this version. [3] In another story, Virupaksha is believed to be the chief of Nāgas, the gatekeepers of lord Shiva. [3]
