= List of Kirati kings =

The page is a list of Kirati kings who ruled in Nepal from c. 800 BCE to c. 300 CE.

== List of Kirat Kings ==
According to a chronicle of Bansawali William Kirk Patrick and Daniel Wright, The Kirat kings were:

No.	Name	Dates	Reign Length	Succession	Notes
1	Yellung Hang or Yalambar	c. 800 BCE	13 years	–	Defeated Bhuban Singh in the battle.; Made Matatirtha his capital.; His kingdom covered the region between the Teesta River and the Trishuli River.; Mentioned in the Mahabharata.
2	Pari Hang or Pabi			Son of Yalambar.	
3	Skandhar Hang or Skhandhara			Son of Pabi.	
4	Balamba Hang			Son of Skandhara.	
5	Hriti Hang			Son of Balamba.	
6	Humati Hang			Son of Hriti.	
7	Jitedasti Hang			Son of Humati.	The Buddha visited Nepal during his reign.
8	Galinja Hang or Gali			Son of Jitedasti.	
9	Oysgja Hang or Pushka			Son of Gali.	
10	Suyarma Hang			Son of Pushka.	
11	Papa Hang or Parba			Son of Suyarma.	
12	Bunka Hang			Son of Parba.	
13	Swawnanda Hang			Son of Bunka.	
14	Sthunko Hang	c. 250 BCE		Son of Swananda.	Emperor Ashoka of the Maurya Empire visited the Kathmandu Valley during his reign.; The Emperor's daughter Charumati also visited with him.; A marriage was arranged between Charmuti and a Nepalese prince named Devapala.
15	Jinghri Hang or Gighri			Son of Sthunko.	
16	Nane Hang			Son of Gighri.	
17	Luka Hang or Luk			Son of Nane.	
18	Thor Hang			Son of Luk.	
19	Thoko Han			Son of Thor.	
20	Verma Hang or Barma			Son of Thoko.	
21	Guja Hang			Son of Barma.	
22	Pushkar Hang or Pushka			Son of Guja.	
23	Keshu Hang or Kesu			Son of Pushka.	
24	Suja Hang or Suga			Son of Kesu.	
25	Sansa Han			Son of Suga.	
26	Gunam Hang			Son of Sansa.	
27	Khimbu Hang			Son of Gunam.	
28	Paruka Hang or Patuka			Son of Khimbu.	Fled to Sankhamul due to repeated invasions by the Soma dynasty.
29	Gasti Hang			Son of Patuka.	Defeated by Nimisha of the Soma dynasty.

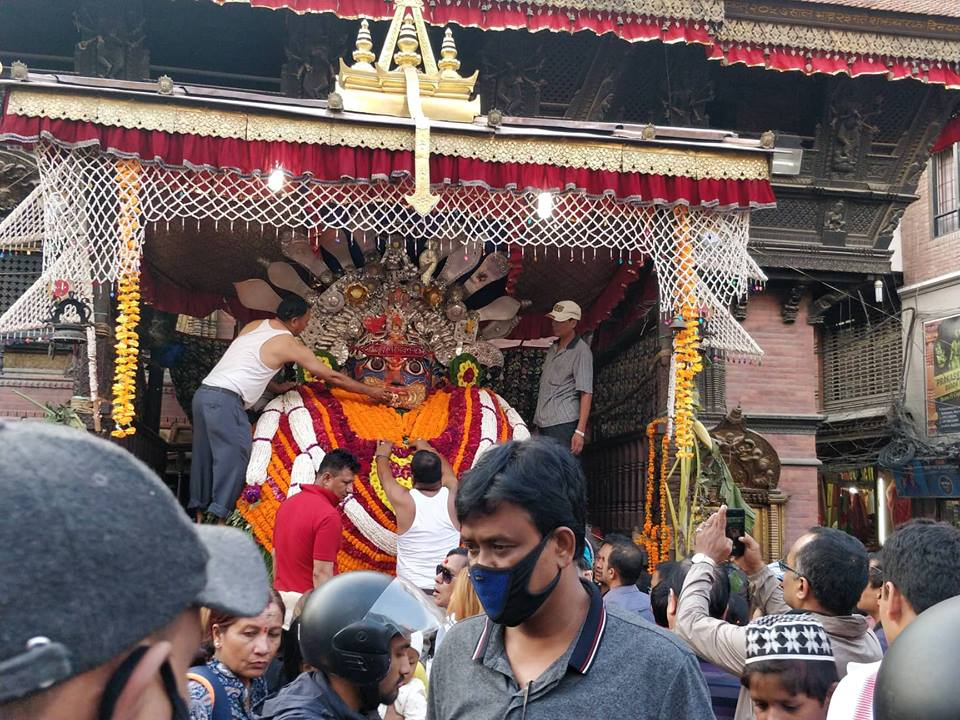
Sattal Akash Bhairava (Yalembar) at Indra Chowk

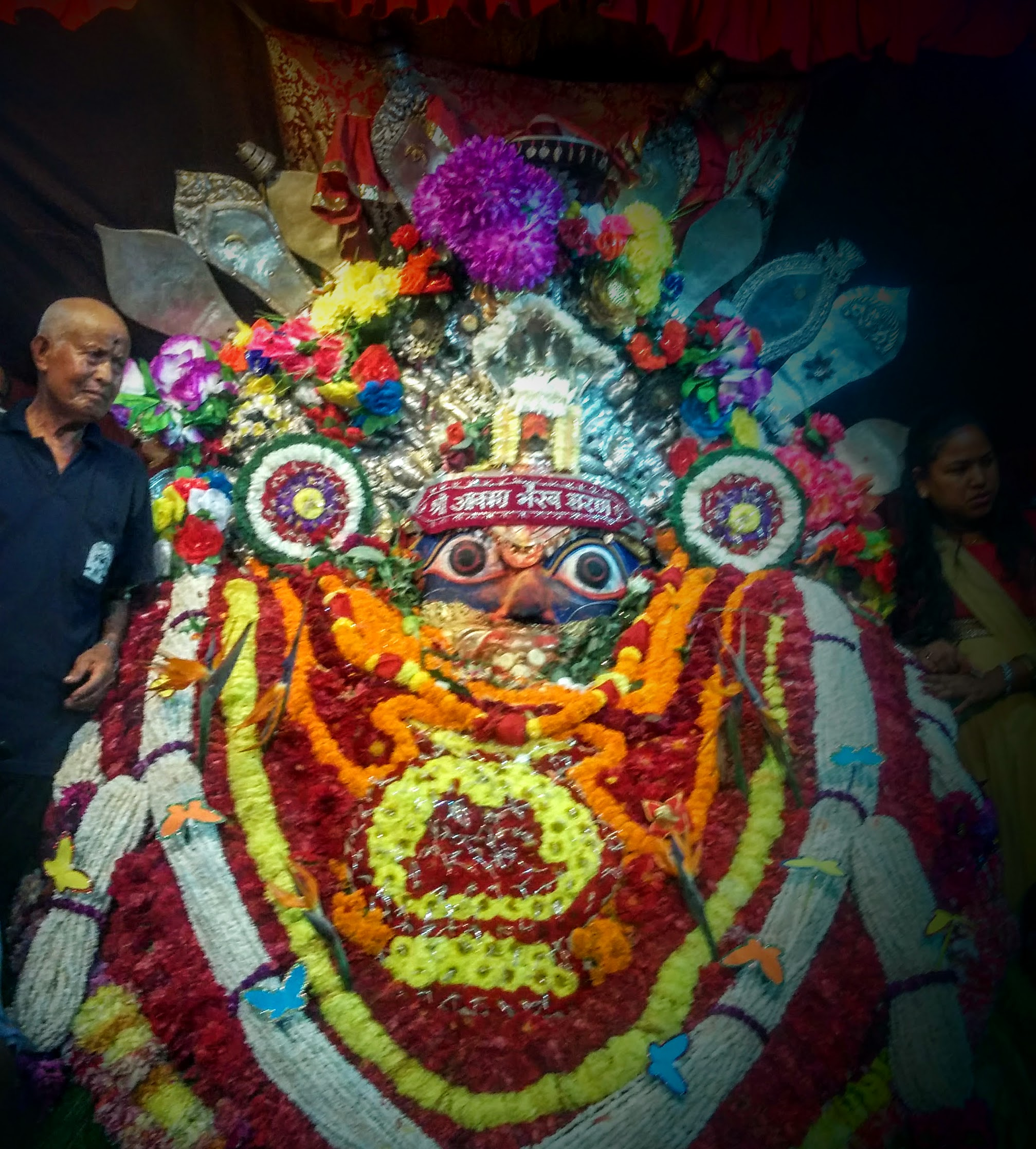
Mask of Akash Bhairava (Yalembar) at Indra Chowk
