= Rajan Mukarung =

Nepalese writer

- राजन मुकारुङ
- Born: 24 February 1978 (age 48); Bhojpur, Nepal
- Education: B.A. in Sociology and History (2000)
- Alma mater: Tribhuvan University
- Occupation: Writer
- Years active: 2000-present
- Notable work: Winner of Madan Puraskar 2012 with Damini Bhir
- Spouse: Pragati Mukarung
- Children: 2

Rajan Mukarung (राजन मुकारुङ; born 24 February 1978) is a writer and novelist of Nepali literature. His novel Damini Bhir was awarded with Madan Puraskar for the year 2012. He is one of the initiators of the movement called Srijanshil Arajakta (Creative Anarchy) along with Upendra Subba and Hangyug Agyat.

== Notable works ==
=== Published books ===
- Seto Aarohan (1999)
- Prarambha Prakshepan (2001)
- Jikirko Gaddi (2002)
- Kirat Sanskar (2004)
- Mithak Maya (2005)
- Hetchhakuppa (2008)
- Damini Bhir (2012)
- Ferindo Saundarya (2015)
- Hata Jane Aghillo Rat (2019)

=== Edited works ===
- Gorkha Sainik Aawaj Monthly (1999–2002)
- Japanko Chakkar (1999)
- Bais Janghar Tarepachhi (2000)
- Nipsung (2001)
- Gorkhali Weekly (2002)
- Birseka Anuharharu (2002)
- Sahitya Samanwaya Bi-monthly (2001–2006)
- Ridum Mundhum (2005)
- Kirati Mission Monthly (2006–2007)
- Annapurna Swarna Jayanti-Smarika (2006)
- Kirat Rai Yayokhha - Smarika (2009)

=== Plays ===
- Khuwalung: Dhunga ko Bato (2022, about Khuwalung)

== Awards and felicitations ==
- Kirat Rai Sahitya Samman - 2001
- Madanswori Memorial Award - 2008
- International Kirat Sahitya Samman - 2008
- Madan Puraskar - 2012
- Pahichan Puraskar - 2016
