= Akash Bhairav =

One of the different forms of Bhairava

Aakash Bhairav
- Sky
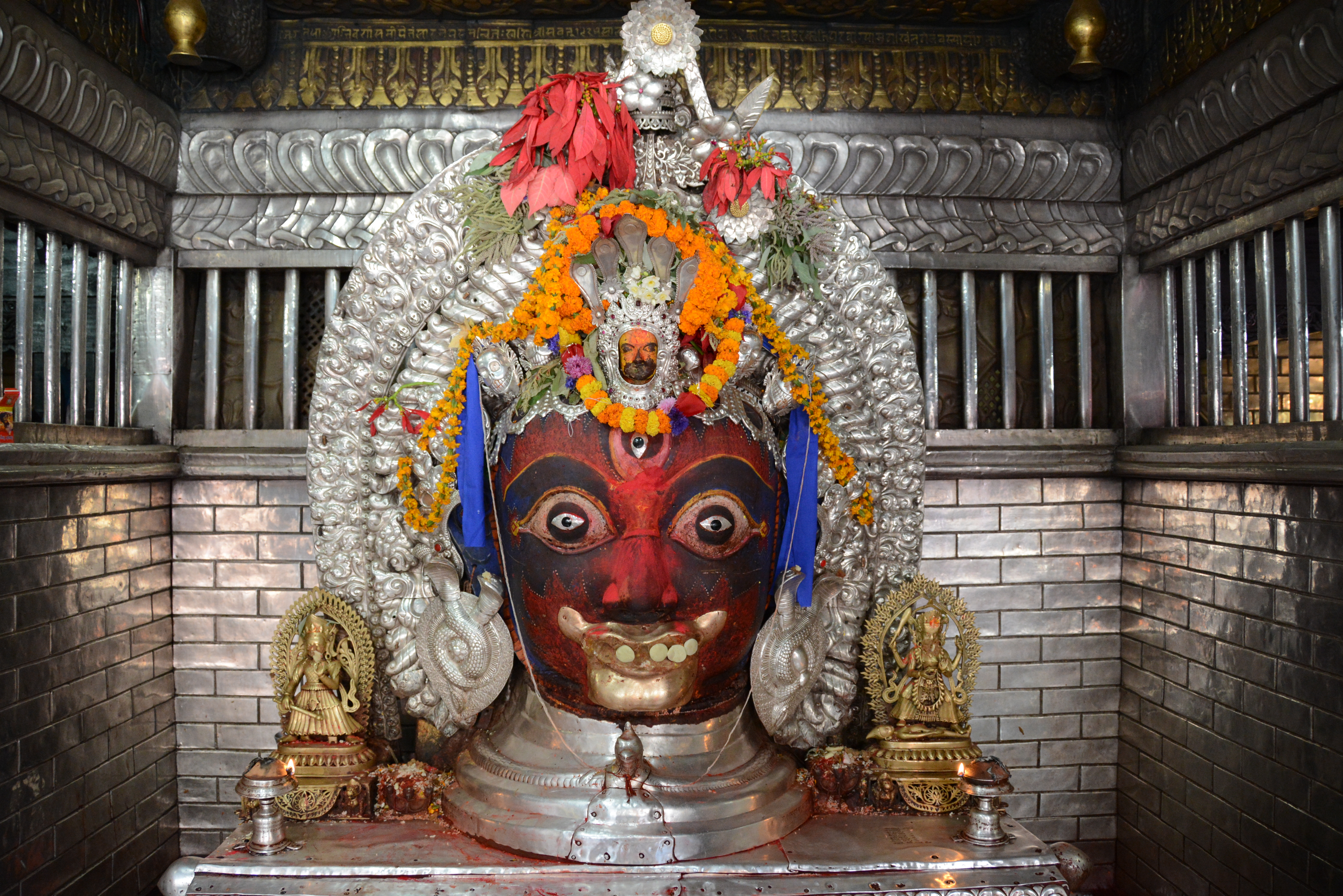
- Akash Bhairab, Indra Chowk, Kathmandu
- Venerated in: Nepal (Kathmandu)
- Affiliation: Hinduism Buddhism Kiratism
- Gender: Male
- Temples: Aakash Bhairav, Indra Chowk
- Festivals: Yenya

Equivalents
- Historical: Yalamber

Akash Bhairav (Nepali: आकाश भैरव) or Aaju (Newar: आजु) is one of the different forms of Bhairava.

The temple of Akash Bhairav is said to have been a palace of the king of Nepal, Kirati King Yalambar, around 3100–3500 years ago. The surrounding of Akash Bhairav is known as Yen to symbolize Ne of Nepal. Ne means Midland in Kirati language. The head of the Aakash Bhairav was dug up several hundred years ago in Kathmandu. It is taken out once a year on the occasion of Yenya Festival and blessed by the Kumari, the living goddess who lives in the nearby Basantapur. This ceremony is held in the month of August/September. During the ceremony, large numbers of worshippers come to visit this temple. They offer Peda (sweets made from milk), flowers, money and several others things. We could have witnessed the late dynasty exchanging the swords with that of Akash Bhairav, most recently by the previous king Gyanendra of Nepal and late King Birendra of Nepal before him. In reality, they had made the offering and shown deep respect towards the historic icon.

== Other names ==
He is also known as King Yalambar in Nepal, and Āaju meaning First King in Nepal Bhasa.

== History of the Deity ==
The Akash Bhairab is said to be the king Yalambar himself. Legend has it that Yalambar was the first king to establish this nation and even extended towards Tista in east and Trishuli in the west. He is believed to have gained the powers through tantric worshipping.

Aakash Bhairav has often been depicted in Buddhist iconography by a large blue head with a fierce face, huge silver eyes and a crown of skulls and serpents. The deity head resides on a silver throne that is carried by lions, accompanied by Bhimsen (Bhima) and Bhadrakali on either side. The idol face is understood to represent the mask that King Yalamber wore on his way to the Kurukshetra. The Indrachok idol is somewhat milder in demeanor than many of the Buddhist idols.

Lord Aakash Bhairav, the 'god of the sky', is also regarded by Nepalese as a progenitor of the Maharjan caste, especially the peasant groups. Pictured on Aakash Bhairav's head is an image that the Buddhists identify as Buddha, and the Hindus identify as Brahma, thus making the idol of Yalamber/Aakash Bhairav worshipped by all.

== Worship ==
The traditional Akash Bhairav Puja is accompanied by Upasana and Anusthan. Sacred water, sandalwood, flowers, fruits, incense, and naibedya are some of the offerings for this ceremony. Legend has it that worship of the Bhairav is usually a mark of safety and strength. In the Nepali imagination, the Akash Bhairav symbolizes protection and goodwill for the nation and its people.

Religion, nation, people, belief, faith and traditional thanksgiving are all interwoven in this manifestation of Bhairav worship. The Akash Bhairav is also believed to be the Jeevan-Tatwa. Culturalism is seen in Bhairav worship and the temple itself. It stands as a grand testament to a cultural personification of Upasamhar. For eight days during the Indra Jatra, celebrations in the temple consist of adorning the temple and the deity. This is followed by the Tantrik Puja, the Sagun Puja, and the Kal Puja. The worshipper and the deity are held together in a uniquely 'reciprocal' dynamic.

In September 2007, Nepal's state-run airline confirmed that it had sacrificed two goats to appease Akash Bhairab, whose symbol is seen on the company's planes, following technical problems with one of its aircraft.

== Gallery ==
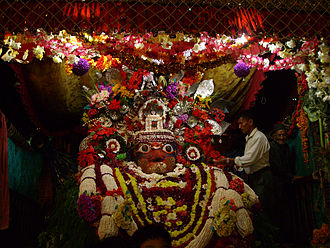
Aakash bhairav during Indra Jatra

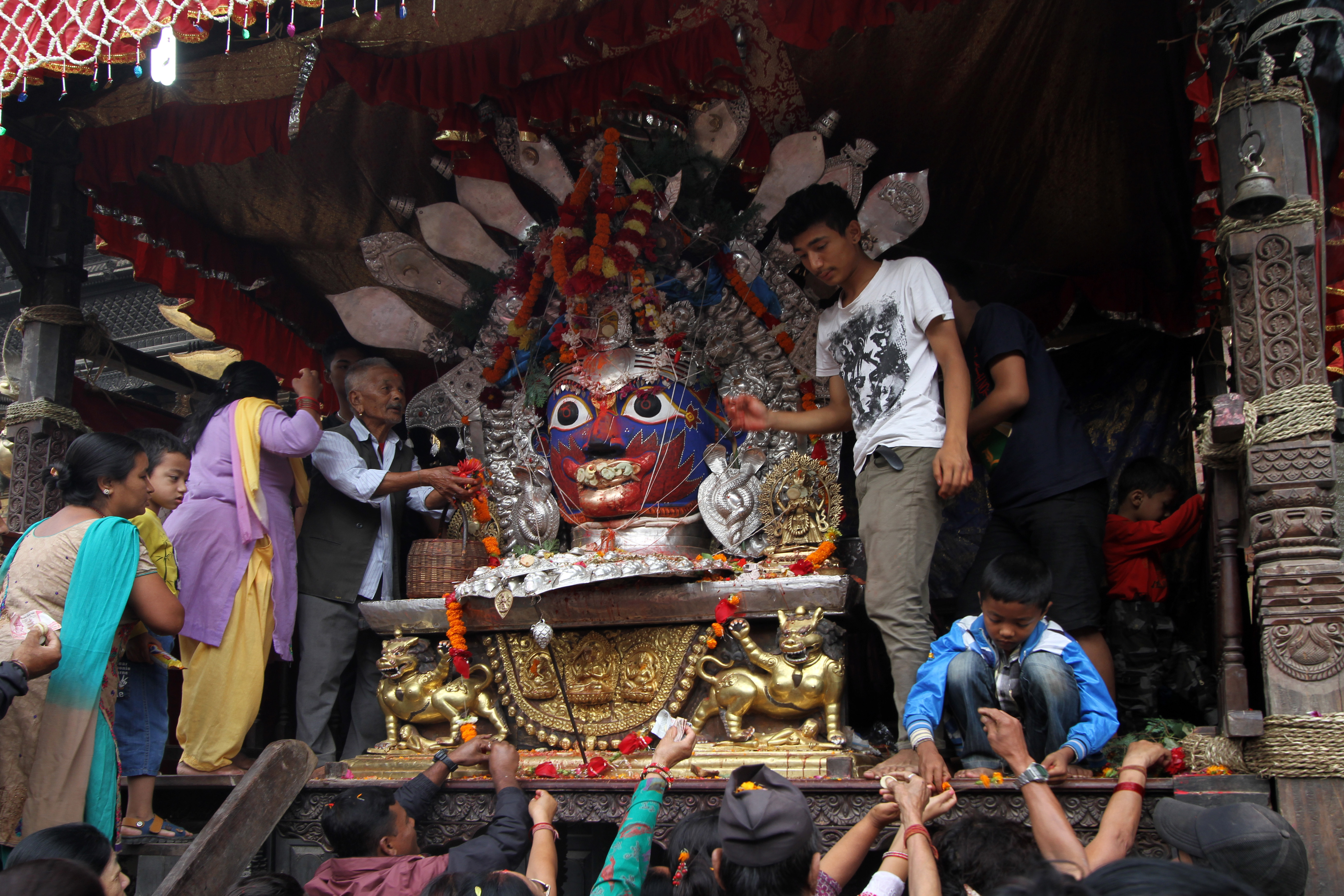
Preparing Akash Bhairav for Indra Jatra

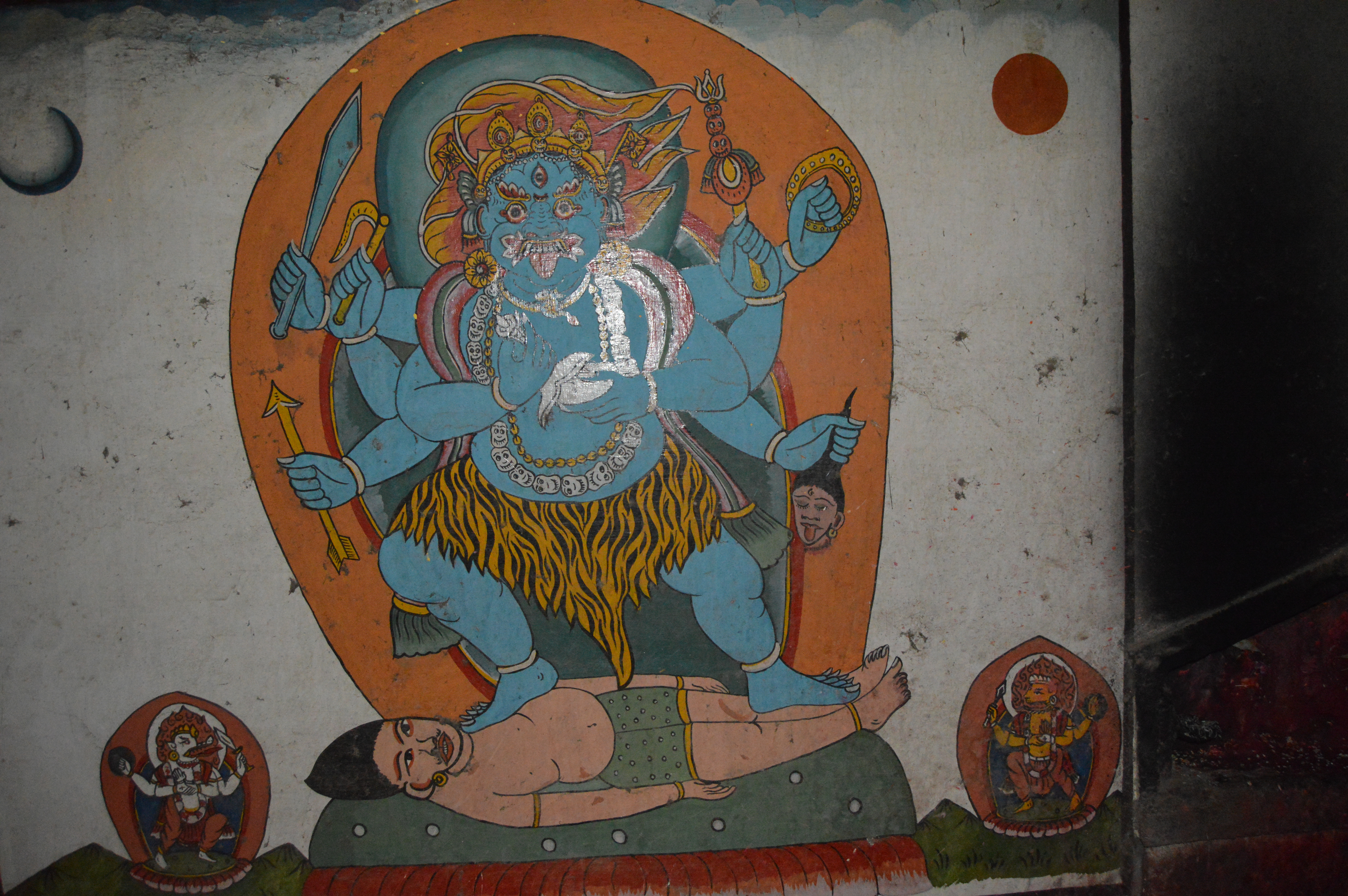
Bhairav Picture inside Aakash Bhairav Temple

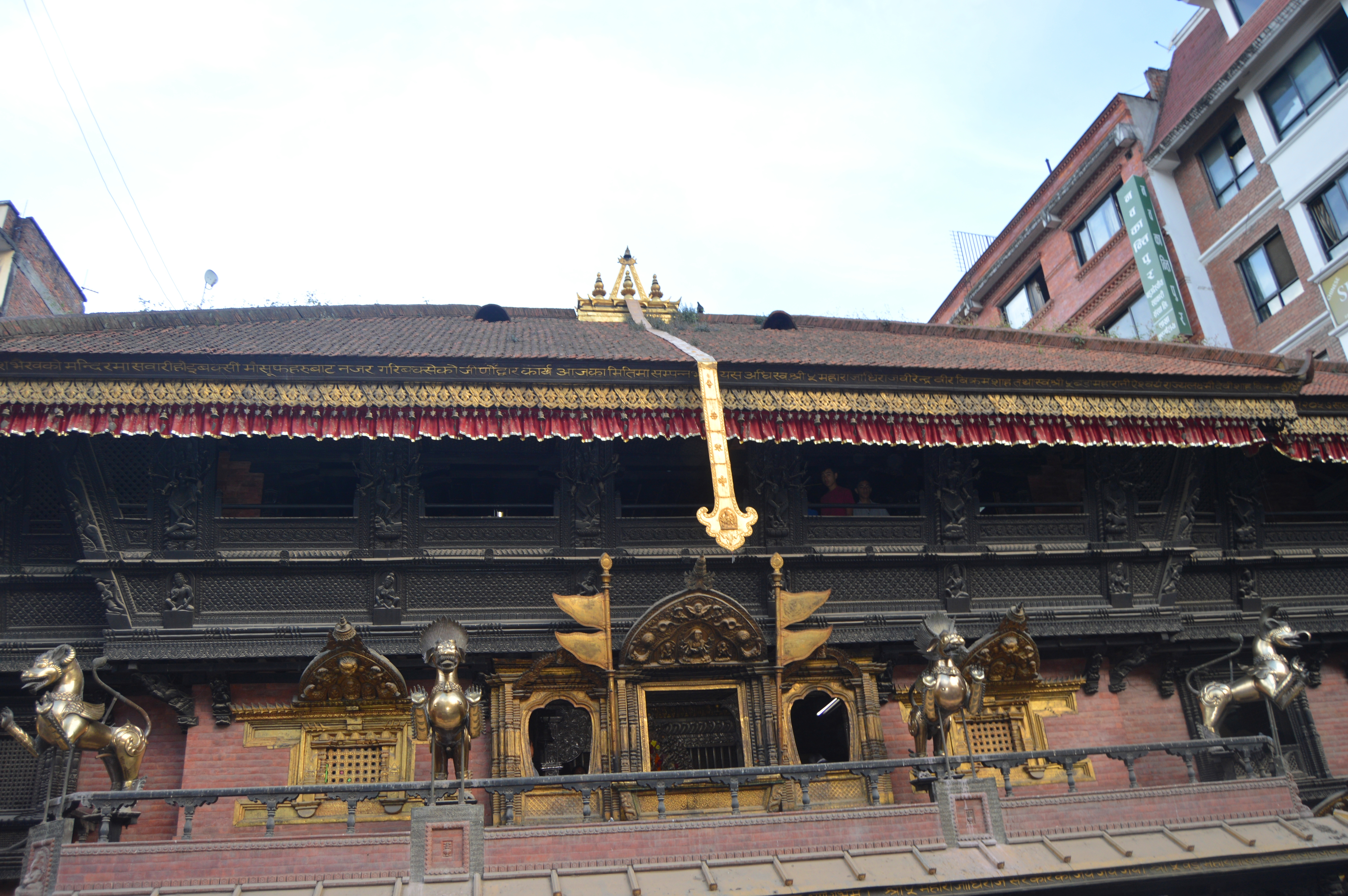
Akash Bhairav Temple
