= Srijanshil Arajakta =

Nepali literary movement

Srijanshil Arajakta (Nepali: सृजनशिल अराजकता, lit. 'creative anarchy') is a literary movement in Nepal described by the Kathmandu Post as "urg[ing] the inclusion of ethnic identities within mainstream Nepali literature." Novelist Rajan Mukarung and poets Upendra Subba and Hangyug Agyat started the movement in 1997.

== Principles ==
The principles of Srijanshil Arajakta are as follows;

- Plurality in thoughts
- Multicultural writings
- Ethnic consciousness
- Poetic freedom
- Creative decision

== See also ==
- Ralpha
- Tesro Aayam
