= Paruhang and Sumnima =

Paruhang and Sumnima (Bantawa: पारुहाङ सुम्निमा) are the supreme deities in the indigenous spiritual tradition of the Kirat people. Paruhang represents the sky, universe, and celestial powers, symbolizing cosmic order, creation, rain, and divine protection. Sumnima represents the Earth, nature, and fertility, embodying motherhood, agriculture, forests, rivers, and the nurturing force of life. Together, Paruhang and Sumnima symbolize the sacred union of Heaven and Earth, expressing harmony, balance, and the interconnectedness of the natural and spiritual worlds in the Kirat Rai Mundhum tradition.
