= Damini Bhir =

Book by Rajan Mukarung

Damini Bhir (दमिनी भीर)
- Author: Rajan Mukarung
- Original title: दमिनी भीर
- Language: Nepali
- Subject: Social transformation
- Genre: Novel
- Published: 2012
- Publisher: Phoenix Books
- Publication place: Nepal
- Pages: 290
- Awards: Madan Puraskar 2069 BS
- ISBN: 9937867215

Damini Bhir (Nepali: दमिनी भीर) is a Nepali novel written by Rajan Mukarung which won the Madan Puraskar in 2069 BS. The novel depicts the circumstances, psychology and practices of Nepali society during transitional phase in unique and very practical manner, while also bringing voices of the marginalized into play.
