= Maghe Sankranti =

Annual Nepali festival

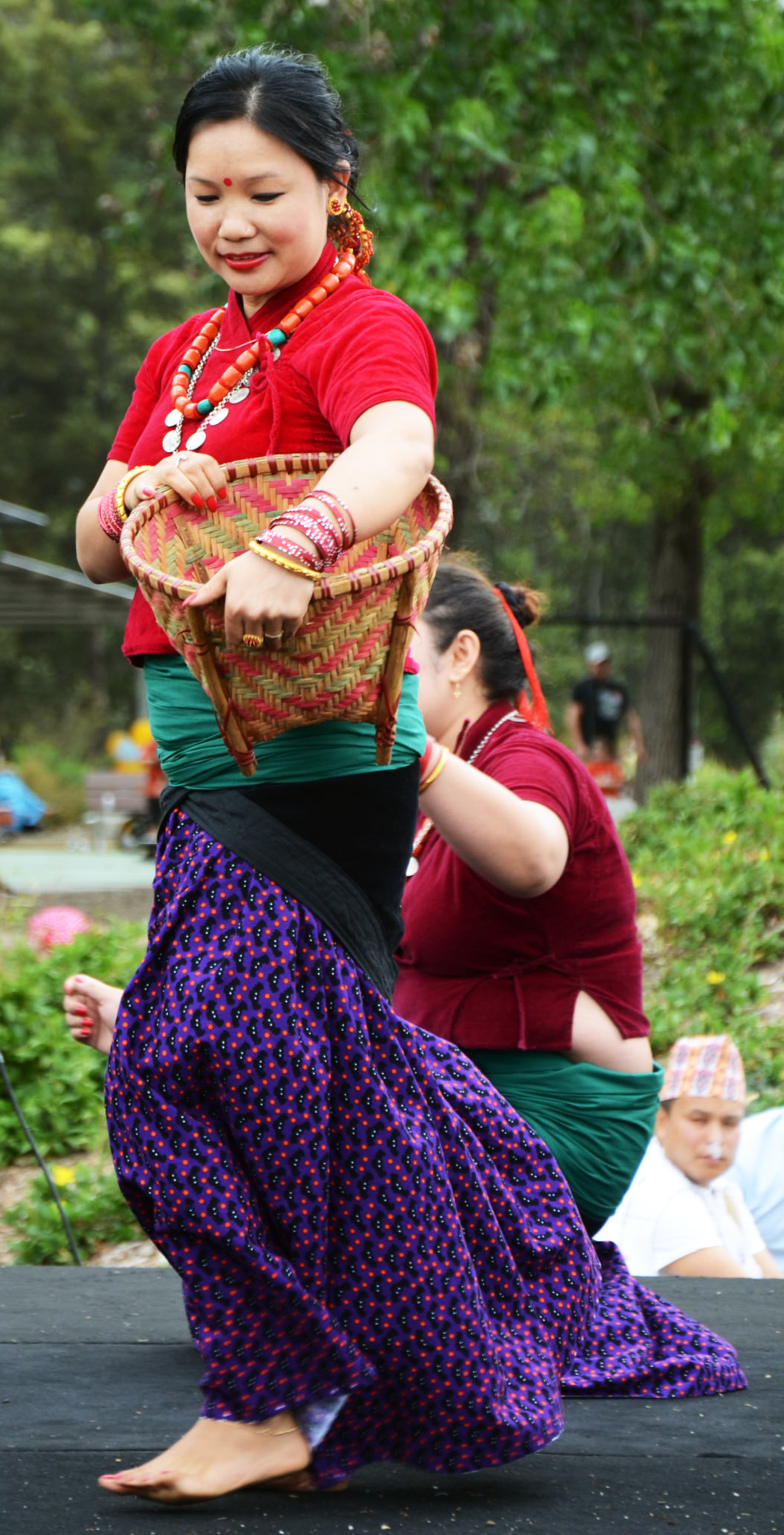
- Basket dance at Maghe Sankranti
- Observed by: Traditionally by Nepali Hindus (presently also by Buddhist, Kirat)
- Type: Religious, cultural
- Significance: marks the end of the winter solstice and the beginning of warmer and longer days
- Celebrations: Gathering, feast
- Date: Usually 14 January
- Frequency: Annual
- Related to: Makar Sankranti

Maghe Sankranti (Nepali: माघे सङ्क्रान्ति, Maithili: माघि, Nepal Bhasa: घ्यःचाकु संल्हु) is a Nepali festival observed on the first day of Magh in the Vikram Sambat (B.S) or Yele calendar, marking the end of the winter solstice and the month of Poush. The Tharu people celebrate this day as the beginning of their new year. It is also regarded as a major government-declared annual festival of the Magar community. Maghe Sankranti shares similarities with solstice festivals in various other religious traditions.

Observant Hindus take ritual baths during this festival. These include Janakpurdham, Sankhamul on the Bagmati River near Patan, in the Gandaki/Narayani river basin at Triveni, Devghat near Chitwan Valley and Ridi on the Kaligandaki River, and in the Koshi River basin at Dolalghat on the Sunkoshi River. Festive foods like Chaku, Ghee, and Sweet potatoes are distributed. Nieces and nephews usually go to Mama Ghar to receive tika, blessings, and dakshina (monetary gifts).

== Date and significance ==
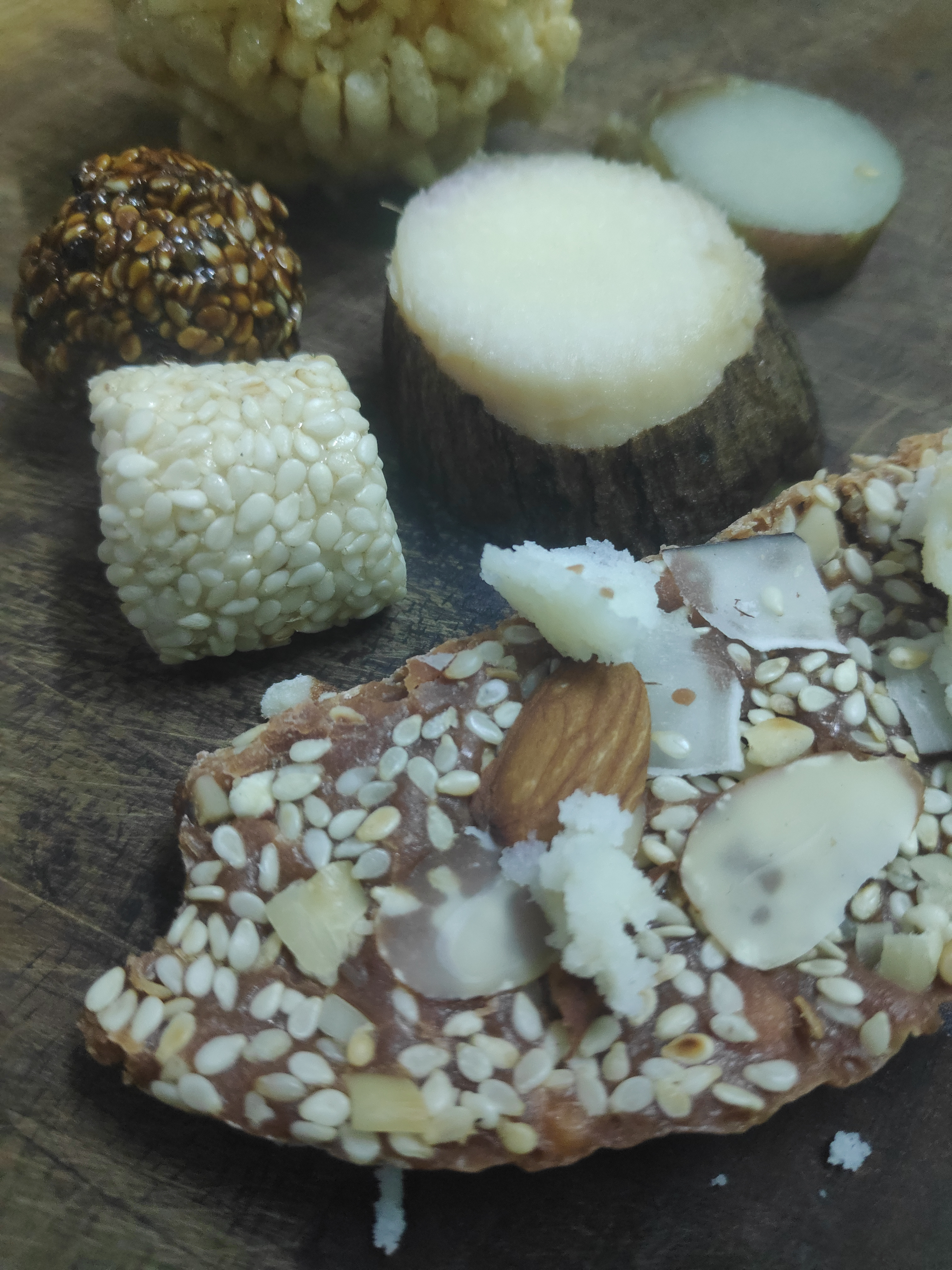
Maghe Sankranti Food

Generally Maghe Sankranti falls on 14 January, and also called Makar Sankranti or Maghi in the Indian subcontinent. Maghe Sankranti is a major harvest festival celebrated in Nepal. Sankranti marks the transition of the Sun from one zodiac sign to another, and when the Sun enters Capricorn (Makara), it is called Makara Sankranti. This occasion is called Makara Sankranti in the Pahari context. It is one of the few Nepalese festivals celebrated by the Madhesi, Magar, and Tharu people communities on a fixed date, i.e., 14 January because this solar festival, honoring the deity Surya, follows the solar cycle of the Bikrami calendar, unlike other festivals that follow lunar cycle.

Maghe Sankranti is regarded as marking the beginning of an auspicious phase in Nepalese culture. It is cited as the 'holy phase of transition'. It marks the end of an inauspicious phase which according to the Hindu calendar begins around mid-December. It is believed that any auspicious and sacred ritual can be sanctified in any Nepali family, from this day onwards. Scientifically, this day marks the beginning of warmer and longer days compared to the nights. In other words, Sankranti marks the end of the winter season and the beginning of a new harvest or spring season.

Across the country, Maghe Sankranti is observed with great fanfares. However, it is celebrated under different names and with distinct rituals in various parts of the country. In the states of northern and western Nepal, the festival is celebrated as Makar Sankranti with special zeal and fervour. The importance of this day is highlighted in ancient epics such as the Mahabharata. So, apart from socio-geographical importance, Maghe Sankranti holds historical and religious significance. As a festival dedicated to the Sun God, who symbolizes divinity and wisdom, it holds profound significance.

== Makar Sankranti and the Winter Solstice ==
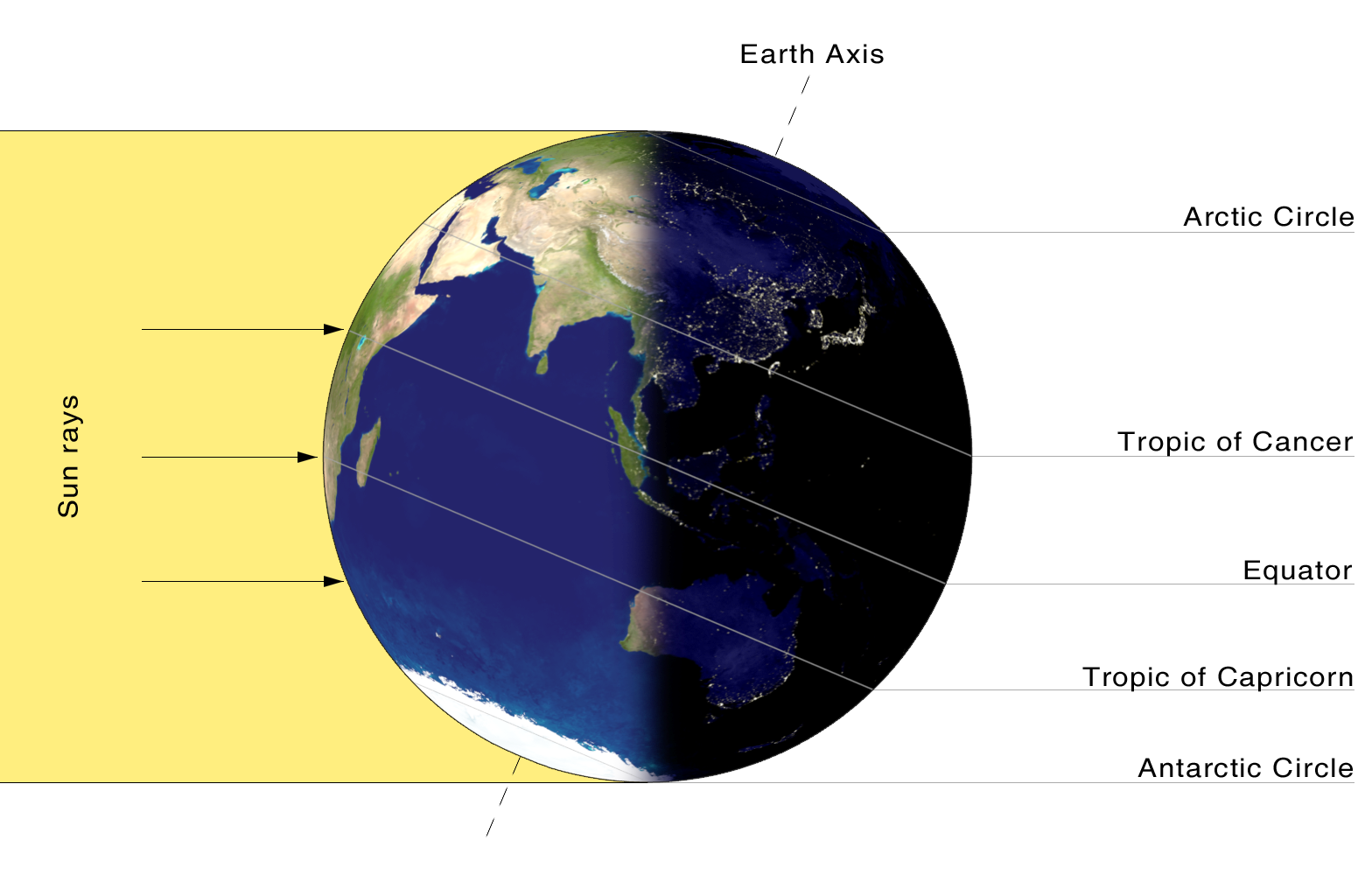
Winter Solstice

Many Nepalese associate this festival with the Winter Solstice, and believe that the sun ends its southward journey (Sanskrit: Dakshinayana) at the Tropic of Capricorn, and starts moving northward (Sanskrit: Uttarayana) towards the Tropic of Cancer, in the month of Poush on this day in mid-January.

Although there is no direct solar observance of the Winter Solstice in Nepali tradition, the Vaikuntha Ekadashi festival, based on the lunar calendar, falls closest. Additionally, the Sun begins its northward journey the day after the winter solstice, as daylight increases. Thus, Makar Sankranti marks the celebration of the day after the Winter Solstice.

Scientifically, in the Northern Hemisphere, the winter solstice occurs between 21 and 22 December. Daylight begins to increase on 22 December and on this day, the Sun will begin its northward journey which marks Uttarayaan. The date of winter solstice changes gradually due to the Axial precession of the Earth, coming earlier by approximately 1 day in every 70 years. Thus, if Maghe Sankranti once marked the day after the actual Winter Solstice, this would mean that a mid-January date would align with around 300 CE, the peak of Hellenic mathematics and astronomy, which influenced northern India.

== See also ==
- Vaikuntha Chaturdashi
- Makar Sankranti
