= Kirat Rai Yayokkha =

Social organization of the Kirat Rai

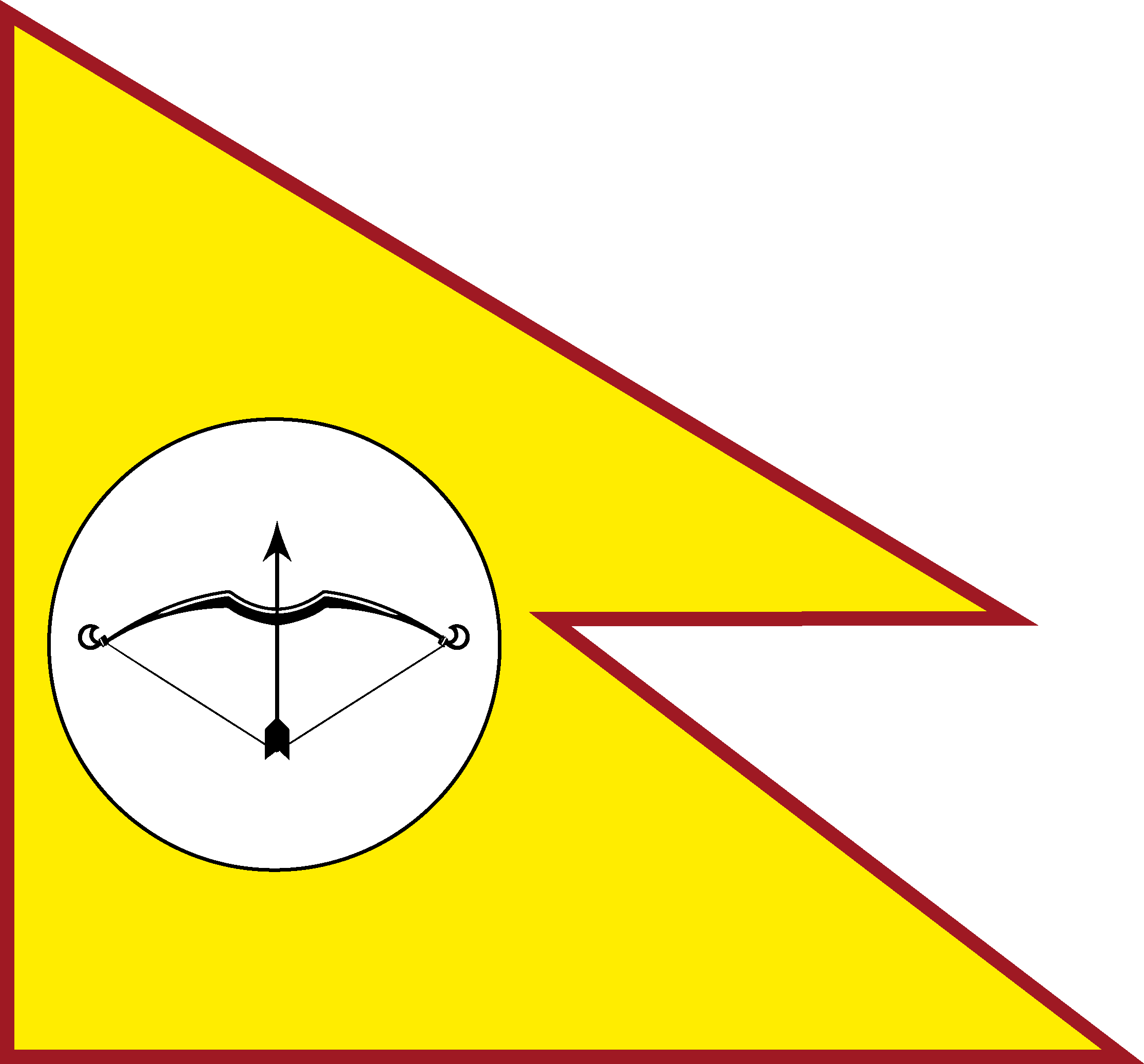
Kirat Rai Yayokkha
- किरात राई यायोक्खा
- The Emblem of Kirat Rai Yayokkha
- Founded: 1990 (2047 B.S)
- Type: Non-governmental organization, Non-profit organization
- Purpose: Kirat Rai Community
- Location: Koteshwor, Nepal
- Region served: Worldwide
- President: Mr.Youbraj Rai(since from 13 October 2026)
- General Secretary: Manju Sotang Rai(since from 13 October 2026)
- Website: http://kryuk.org/, https://kiratrai.org/

Kirat Rai Yayokkha (Nepali: किरात राई यायोक्खा) is a social organization of the Rai people, an indigenous ethnic group in Nepal that established in 1990 (2047 B.S.) The word "Kirat" describes the ancient tribes of Nepal, while "Rai" is the name of one of the Kirat ethnic groups. Rai are the native or indigenous people of east Nepal.

The mission of Kirat Rai Yayokkha is to maintain social integrity and acquire equality and justice by protecting, preserving and promoting distinct social and cultural identity and linguistic diversity of Kirat Rai. Kirat Rai Yayokkha is a non-profit, non-political and non-governmental organization.

Branches also exist in other countries. The United Kirat Rai Organization of America was formed in 2007. The Bhutanese Kirat Rai Organization of America, Inc. was formed in 2014. There is also a UK branch.

== See also ==
- Kirat
- Rai people
