= Hangyug Agyat =

Nepalese poet

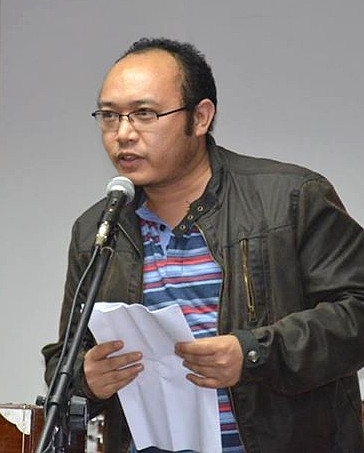
- Agyat reciting his poem
- Born: December 16, 1978 (age 47); Ilam, Nepal
- Occupations: Poet, Writer

Hangyug Agyat (Nepali: हाङयुग अज्ञात) is a poet and writer. He is one of the initiators of the Srijanshil Arajakta (Creative Anarchy) movement, along with Rajan Mukarung and Upendra Subba.

== About his life and career ==
Poet Hangyug Agyat was born in Ilam city, eastern district of Nepal. He started his writing career as literary columnist in Ruprekha Weekly, Kathmandu, in 1997.

With an urge to write with the contemporary time and the situation he started a literary campaign called 'Contemporary Writing'.

Around this time, he met Rajan Mukarung and Upendra Subba. They jointly started a new literary movement called Srijanshil Arajakta (meaning creative anarchy).

They didn't find their life in the contemporary Nepalese Literature. Therefore, in 1997 they made the following 5 conditions with an urge to write their own life in the contemporary Nepalese literature. The principles of "Srijanshil Arajakta" are as follows;

- Plurality in thoughts
- Multicultural writings
- Ethnic consciousness
- Poetic freedom
- Creative decision

He has been residing in Hong Kong since 2004. He has introduced Chauchau Sahitya prastavna(meaning instant literature) as a proposal in the urge to write the life of Nepalese people in Hong Kong in 2014.

Hong Kong Nepalese Federation has awarded him with ' Nepali Puraskar 2007' for his contribution to the Nepalese literature in Hong Kong.

He is also a founder member of Critic Society.

Hangyug agyat returned Nepal in 2019. He went to his home town Ilam (Western Nepal) and established 'Ilam Sahitya samaj'. In his home town he organized 'Ilam sahitya mahotsab' where recognized writers from Nepal participated.

He has been awarded 'best lyricist 2019' by Geetkar sangh Nepal for 'Aama' song by Benuka Rai & composed by Dinesh Subba.

== Published books ==
He has published 6 books till the date

- Rangin Aaviskar (2000) anthology of poems
- Dhunga Mudako man (2001)
- Karang ko Hirasat (2003,2014 2nd Edition)
- Kakapik (2004)
- Hong Kong (2014)
- Adha Raat Ko Tangsing (2015)

His 3rd book Karang ko Hirasat is the most celebrated book in Nepalese poetry.

== See also ==
- List of Nepalese poets
