= Mundhum =

Religious scripture of Kirat Mundhum

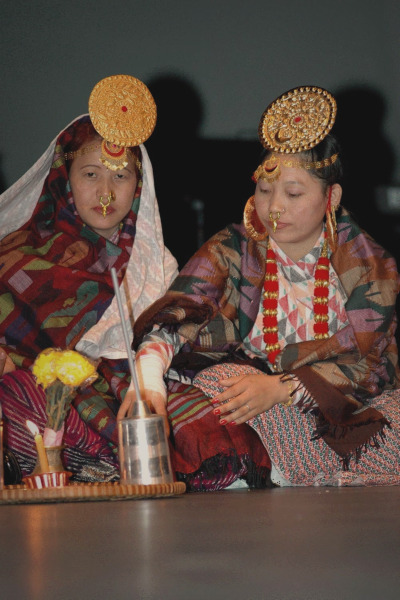
Limbu women with traditional drink Tongba

The Mundhum (also known as Peylan) is the ancient religious scripture and folk literature of Kirat Mundhum, the indigenous religion of the Kirat Yakthung limbu peoples. It is an ancient, indigenous religion of Nepal. Mundhum means "the power of great strength" in the Limbu language. The Mundhum covers many aspects of the yakthung (Limbu) culture, customs and traditions that were followed since before the rise of the Vedic civilisation in the Indian subcontinent.

The Mundhum is organised into two parts: Thungsap and Peysap. The Mundhum extends beyond religion, serving as a guide for culture, ritual and social values. The Mundhum is written in ancient Limbu and versions vary among the various Limbu tribes, serving as each tribe's distinctive culture and framing their social identity and unity in relation to other tribes and peoples.

== Thungsap Mundhum ==
The Thungsap Mundhum was collected, preserved and passed on by word of mouth and folklore until the art of writing was introduced. It was an epic composed and recited in the form of songs by Sambas, religious poets and bards. The Yakthung priests in the beginning were called the Sambas where sam means song and ba means the one (male) who knows the sam.

== Peysap Mundhum ==
The Peysap Mundhum is a written book about religion. It is divided into four parts: the Soksok Mundhum, Yehang Mundhum, Samjik Mundhum and Sap Mundhum. The Soksok Mundhum contains the stories of creation of the universe, the beginning of humankind, the cause and effect of sin, the creation of evil spirits such as the evil spirits of envy, jealousy and anger, and the cause and effect of death in childhood.

The Yehang Mundhum contains the story of the first leader of humankind who made laws for the sake of improvement of human beings from the stage of animal life to the enlightened life and ways to control them by giving philosophy on spiritualism. In this book, the leader has made rules for marriage, arbitration, purification and religion. The story of destruction of human beings by a deluge and the cause of existence of many languages among the Limbu people, the social customs of seasonal worship to the worship of God, the rules of purification on child birth and death are mentioned in the Lepmuhang Mundhum.

The Mundhum is a spiritual, rhythmic and shamanic form of scripture. Mundhum rituals and teachings are only used and performed by a very special Limbu religious master or shamanic guru of Limbu. Mundhum is written in very ancient native language and tones. To study Mundhum, one must study a native language such as Limbu, Yakkha, Bantawa or Sunuwar. Topics in the Mundhum include the origin of earth, air, water, fire and life, medicine, God, all ritual birth, marriage, death.

== See also ==
- Religion in Nepal
- Demographics of Nepal
- Kirat Mundhum
