= Nepal Motion Picture Association =

Nepal Motion Picture Association is an association that promotes Nepali language films.
