= Yuma Sammang =

Ancestor goddess of the Limbu community of Nepal

Yuma Sammang is the goddess of the Limbu community of Nepal. The deity Yuma Sammang (literally: "Mother Earth" or "Grandmother"), also known as Ningwaphuma, is widely revered and regularly worshiped among Yakthungs (Limbus). Yakthungs generally regard Yuma as a maternal figure. The Yuma Samyo or Yuma religion was very popular during the Yet Hang and Thibong Yakthung (Ten Yakthung) ages.

The Yakthung community is predominantly an oral culture. The body of its oral tradition is called Mundhum. Mundhum is a collection of diverse oral narratives addressing topics such as the creation of the universe, human beings, animals, and plants along with many other elements. The Yakthung culture includes Mundhum performers, such as Phedangma, Yeba, Yema, Shamba, Samma, and Tutu-Tumyahangs.

Despite Western cultural colonization and the influence of Hinduism, Buddhism, and Christianity, Yakthungs have preserved their culture via their Mundhums. However, many Yakthungs participating in mainstream politics, bureaucracy, and academic institutions have shown a tendency to ignore their Yakthung customary practices, Mundhums, language, and religion — Yuma Samyo. New Yakthung generations have been campaigning for the restoration of their culture, language, identity, Mundhum, and religion since 2018.
