= Kirat Yakthung Chumlung =

- किरात याक्थुङ चुम्लुङ
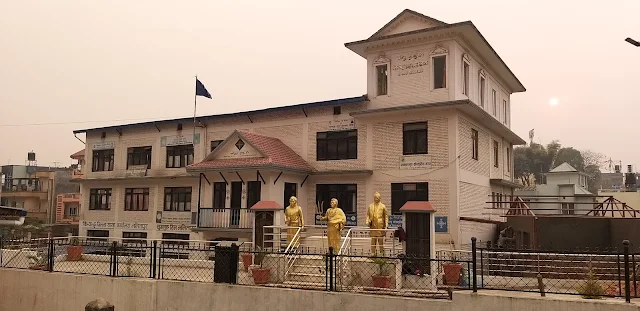
- Kirat Yakthung Chumlung Headquarter in Lalitpur Nepal
- Formation: 1989
- Headquarters: Tikhe Dewal, Lalitpur, Nepal
- Chairman: Mr.Prem Yokten Limbu
- General Secretary: NA
- Website: www.chumlung.org.np

Kirat Yakthung Chumlung (Nepali: किरात याक्थुङ चुम्लुङ) (1989) is a social organization of the Limbu indigenous ethnic group of Nepal.

== See also ==
- Kirat
