= Kirat Region =

The Kirat Region is an area in the eastern Himalayas stretching from eastern Nepal, Sikkim and the hills in Darjeeling, Arunachal Pradesh, Assam, Meghalaya, Manipur, Tripura, Mizoram and Nagaland to western Myanmar; this region is inhabited by Kirati peoples including Rai, Yakkha and Limbu people.

== See also ==
- Sunuwar people
