= Kirati peoples =

Indigenous ethnic groups of the Himalayas

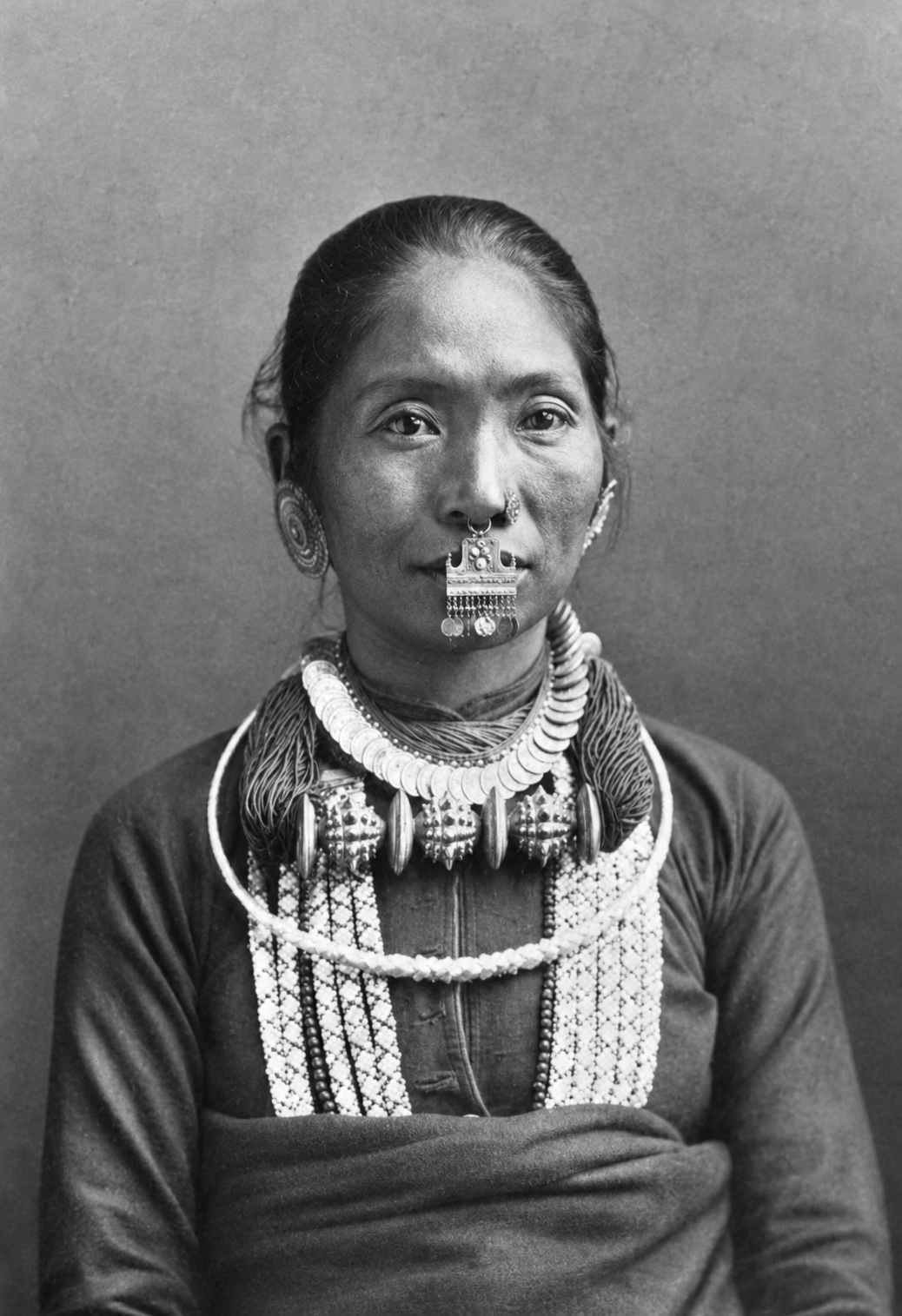
- Kirati tribe women in Sikkim 19th century

Total population
- c. 1.2 million+

Regions with significant populations
- Nepal: 1,200,000 (2021)
- India: NA
- Bhutan: NA

Languages
- Kiranti languages

Religion
- Dominant •96.3% Kiratism or Animism; Minority : •3.7% Hinduism, Christianity, Buddhism(2021)

The Kirati people (also Kirat, Kirant or Kiranti) are Tibeto-Burman ethnolinguistic groups living in the Himalayas, mostly the Eastern Himalaya extending eastward from Nepal to North East India (predominantly in the Indian state of Sikkim and the northern hilly regions of West Bengal, that is, Darjeeling and Kalimpong districts).

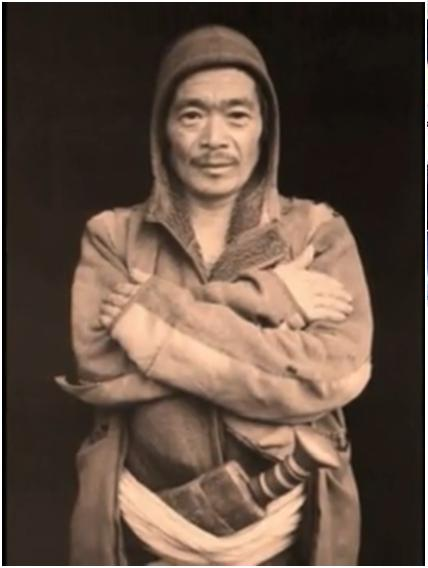
Kirati tribesman from Himalayas

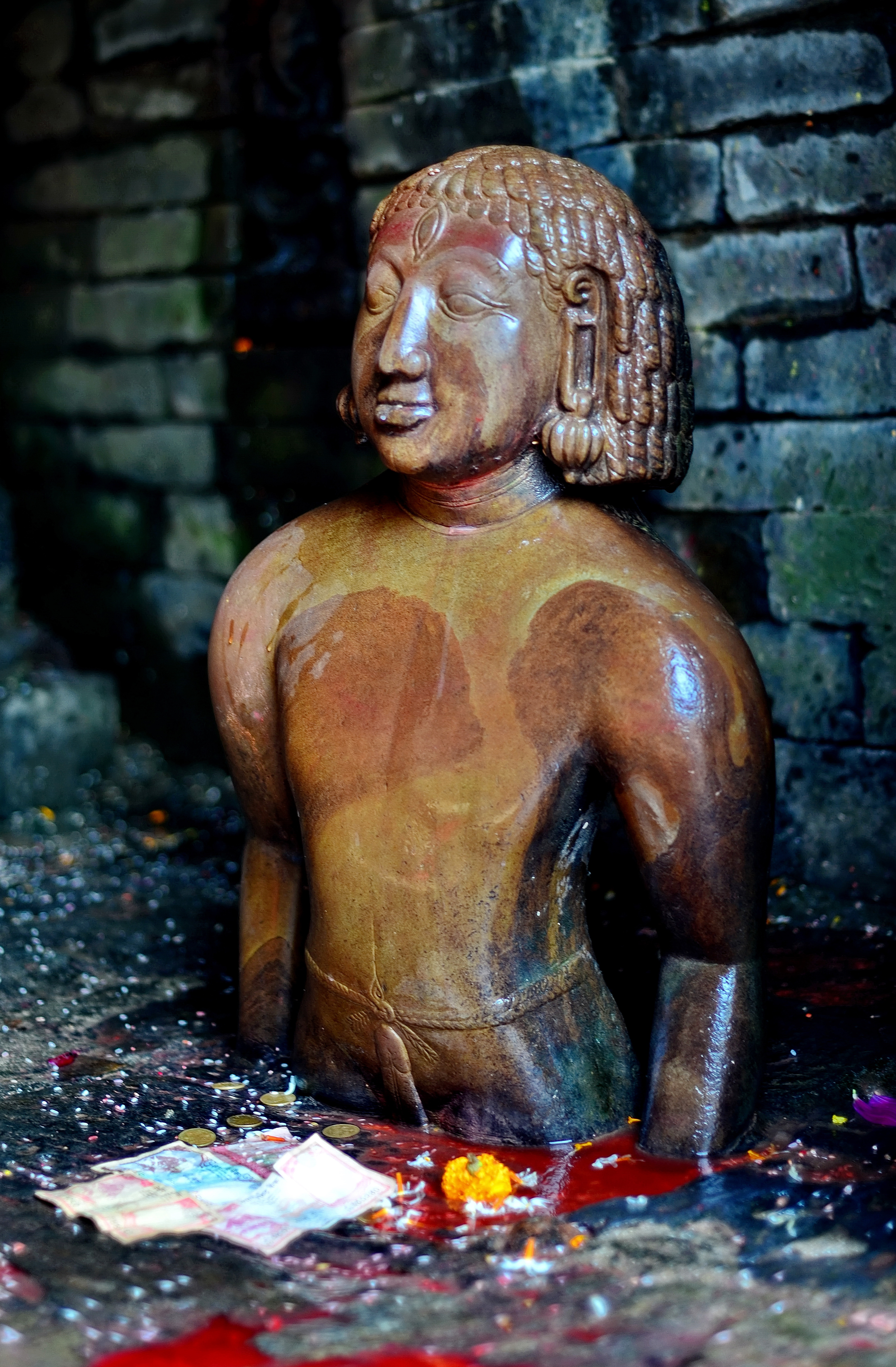
Statue of the Kirati god Birupakshya in Pashupati Aryaghat, Kathmandu, Nepal.

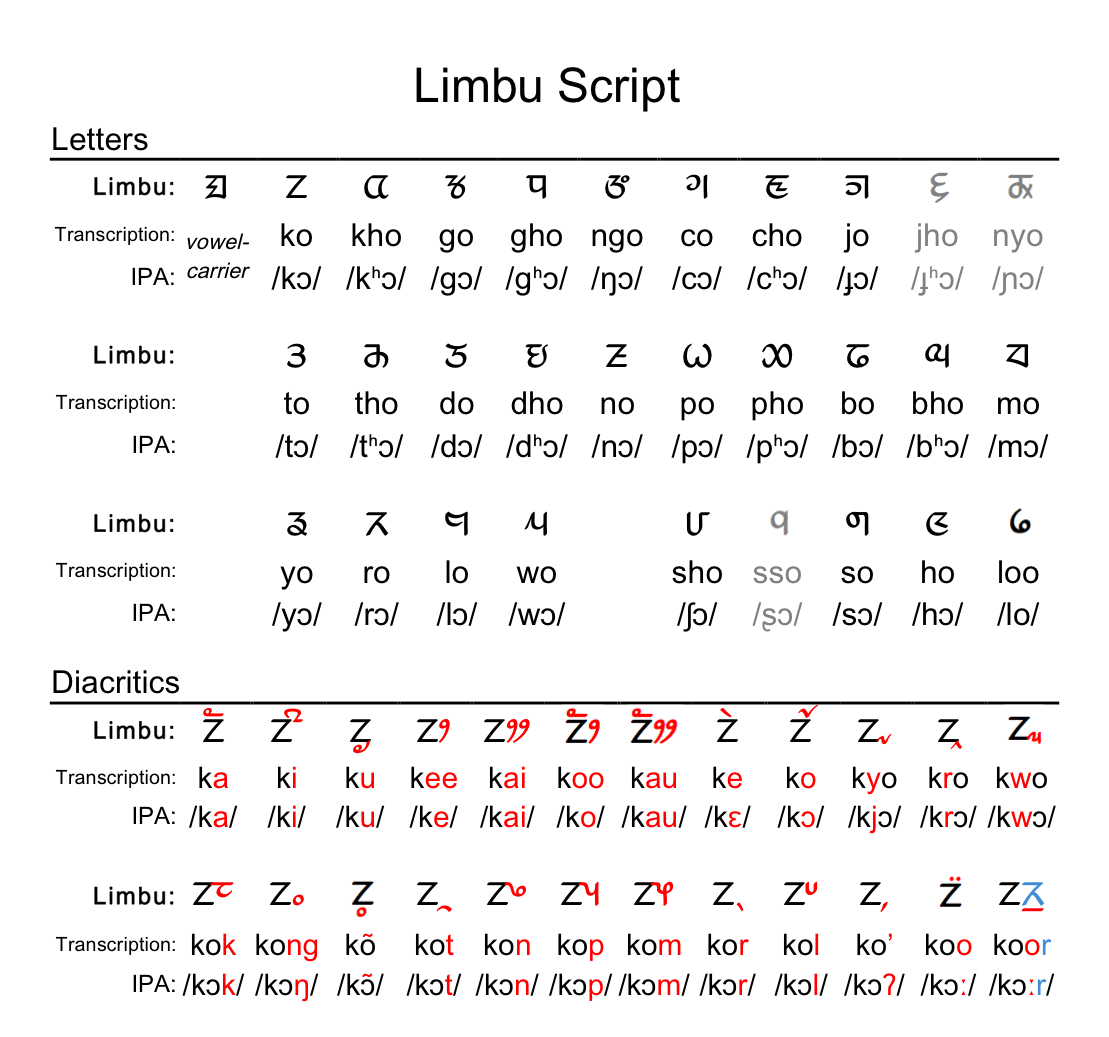
The Sirijanga script. Gray letters are obsolete.

== Modern ethnic groups ==
The Kirati Population in Nepal number approximately one million (around five percent of the Nepalese population) and speak languages belonging to Tibeto-Burman. Kirant culture is clearly different from the Tibetan and Indo-Nepalese ones, although it has been influenced by them through long term contacts. According to census of 2011, the population of the Kirat peoples, are as following:

The Kirati ethnic groups according to 2011 Nepal Census
Group	Languages	Inhabited area
Rai also Called Jemme,Jimdar and Khambu	Kirati languages and Nepali	Province No. 1 and Makawanpur District of Province No. 3 in Nepal, Sikkim, Darjeeling, Kalimpong, Dooars of West Bengal, other Northeastern Indian States, southwestern Bhutan, northern Bangladesh
Limbu Subba	Limbu language and Nepali	Province No. 1 of Nepal, Limbuwan, Sikkim, Darjeeling, Kalimpong, Dooars of West Bengal, other Northeastern Indian States, southwestern Bhutan
Sunuwar Mukhiya	Sunuwar language and Nepali	Province No. 2 of Nepal, Ramechhap, Dolakha, Sindhuli, Okhaldhunga Sholukhumbu, and other parts of eastern Nepal, Sikkim, Darjeeling and, Kalimpong in West Bengal
Yakkha Dewan also known as jime	Yakkha language and Nepali	Province No. 1 of Nepal, Sankhuwasabha, Dhankuta and other parts of eastern Nepal, Sikkim, Darjeeling and Kalimpong in West Bengal

In academic literature, the earliest recorded groups of the Kirati are today divided into five groups — the Yakkha, Limbu, Rai and Sunuwar. When the Shah kings conquered, they established the headman and as local rulers and were given the title Yakkha as Dewan, Khambu as Rai, Limbu as Subba, Sunuwar as Mukhiya.

The Kirat groups that today identify themselves using the nomenclature 'Kirat' include the Khambu (Rai), Limbu (Subba), Sunuwar (Mukhia), Yakkha (Dewan). The tripartition of the Kirat region in Eastern Nepal documented by Hodgson, divided into three region are Wallo Kirat (Near Kirat Khumbu/Khombu/Khimbu), Majh Kirat (Central Kirat/ Khambuwan ) and Pallo Kirat (Far Kirat/ Limbuwan). The region Wallo Kirat, Majh Kirat were predominant by Khambu Kirat and Pallo Kirat were preponderance by Limbu Kirat as known as Limbuwan. The Yakkha, Khambu Rai, Subba Limbu, and Sunuwar are different from one another and yet they all sit under one umbrella in many respects.

The Kirati people and Kiranti languages between the rivers Likhu and Arun, including some small groups east of the Arun, are usually referred to as the Kirat people, which is a geographic grouping rather than a genetic grouping. The Sunuwars inhabit the region westward of River Sun Koshi.

== Kirati origins of Newar society ==
The Kirat were among the earliest inhabitants of the Kathmandu Valley and a large percentage of Newar caste groups such as the Jyapu, Gathu, Sayami and many others are believed to have descended from them. Modern Newar caste groups display mixed racial traits with a predominance of East Asian features following centuries of racial mixing between migrants from the Indian plains and elsewhere with the original population. The putative continuity of Newar society from the mythical Kirat King Yalambar (Aakash Bhairav) and the pre-Licchavi population has been discussed by many historians and anthropologists. The language of the Newars, Nepal bhasa, a Tibeto-Burman language, is classified as a Kirati language. Similarly, the over 200 non-Sanskritic place names found in the Sanskrit inscriptions of the Licchavi period of the first millennium C.E. are acknowledged to belong to the proto-Newar language; modern variants of many of these words are still used by the Newars today to refer to geographical locations in and around Kathmandu valley. Although the 14th century text Gopalarajavamsavali states that at that time, the descendants of the Kirata clan that ruled Nepal before the Licchavis resided in the region of the Tamarkoshi river, a number of Newar caste and sub-caste groups and clans also claim descent from the erstwhile Kirat royal lineage.

Even though most modern Newars are either Hindu or Buddhist or a mixture of the two as a result of at least two millennia of Sanskritization and practice a complicated, ritualistic religious life, vestigal non-Sanskritic elements can be seen in some of their practices that have similarities with the cultures of other Mongoloid groups in the north-east region of India. Sudarshan Tiwari of Institute of Engineering, Tribhuvan University, in his essay "The Temples of the Kirata Nepal" argues that the Newar temple technology based on brick and timber usage and the rectangular temple design used for 'Tantric' Aju and Ajima deities are pre-Licchavi in origin and reflect Newar religious values and geometrical aesthetics from the Kirati period.

== Religion ==
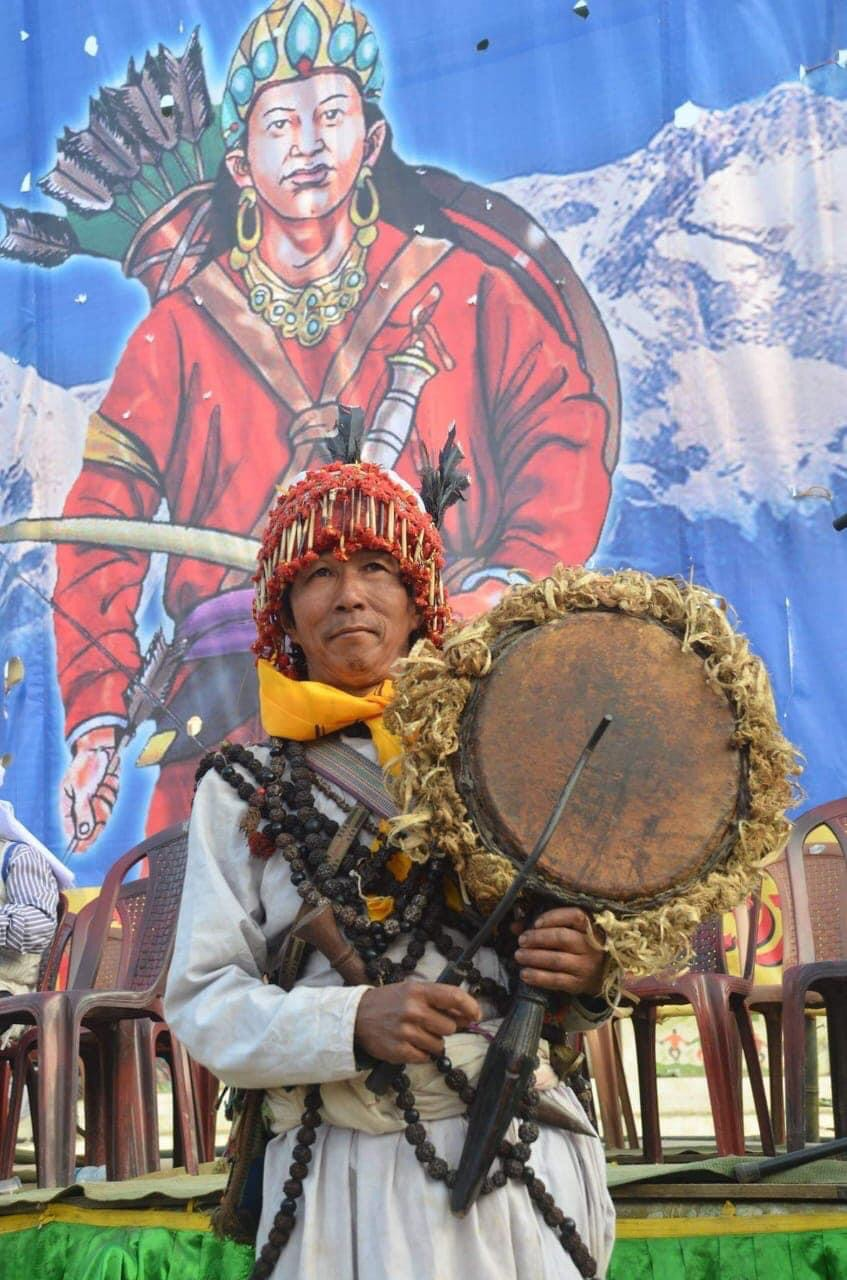
Mangpa Priest of Rai Community Yaledong festival 2014 in Mela ground Kalimpong

The Himalayan Kirat people practice Kirat Mundhum, calling it "Kirat religion". In early Kirat society, Mundhum was the only law of state.

Major ethnic/caste groups following Kirat Religion in Nepal 2011 Census.

The Limbu ancestor Yuma Sammang and god of war Theba Sammang are the second most important deities. The Limbus festivals are Chasok Tangnam (Harvest Festival and worship of Yuma), Yokwa (Worship of Ancestors), Limbu New Year's Day (Maghey Sankranti), Ke Lang, Limbu Cultural Day, Sirijanga Birthday Anniversary. Kirat Rai worship (Sumnima/Paruhang) are their cultural and religious practices..

== Brigade of Gurkhas ==
The British had recruited Gurkhas ethnicity-wise; five regiments were composed of Kirati tribes: Yakkha, Limbu, Rai, Sunuwar. The 7th Gurkha Rifles was raised in 1902 and recruited Rai, Limbu, Yakkha, and Sunuwar from Eastern Nepal. The 10th Gurkha Rifles and the regiment maintained its assigned recruiting areas in the Kirat tribal areas of eastern Nepal as part of a broad reorganisation on 13 September 1901. 11 Gorkha Rifles composed entirely of Kirati non-optees for the British Gorkhas.

== See also ==
- List of Kirati kings
- Kirata, Sanskrit term for various ancient and mythical Himalayan peoples
- Khuwalung, a rock in Koshi river sacred to Kirati people
- Kirata Kingdom, mythological kingdom mentioned in the Mahabharata
- Banjhakri and Banjhakrini, legendary Kirati figures
- Kirateshwar Mahadev Temple
- Kirat Autonomous State
- Rai people or the Khambu
- Limbu people or the Yakthung
- Kirat Rai Yayokkha, an organization of the Rai people
- Kirat Yakthung Chumlung, an organization of the Limbu people
