= Soma dynasty =

Ruling dynasty of Nepal

Soma dynasty (Nepali: सोम वंश; c. 205 – c. 305) was a Hindu dynasty that ruled the present-day Kathmandu Valley, in central Nepal.

== History ==
It was founded by Nimistakar Barma (sometimes referred to as Nimish I) in 205 CE, after the fall of the Kirata Kingdom. In 305, the dynasty was succeeded by the Licchavi dynasty.
