= Yalambar =

Warrior and First Kirat King of Nepal

Yalamber
- यलम्बर
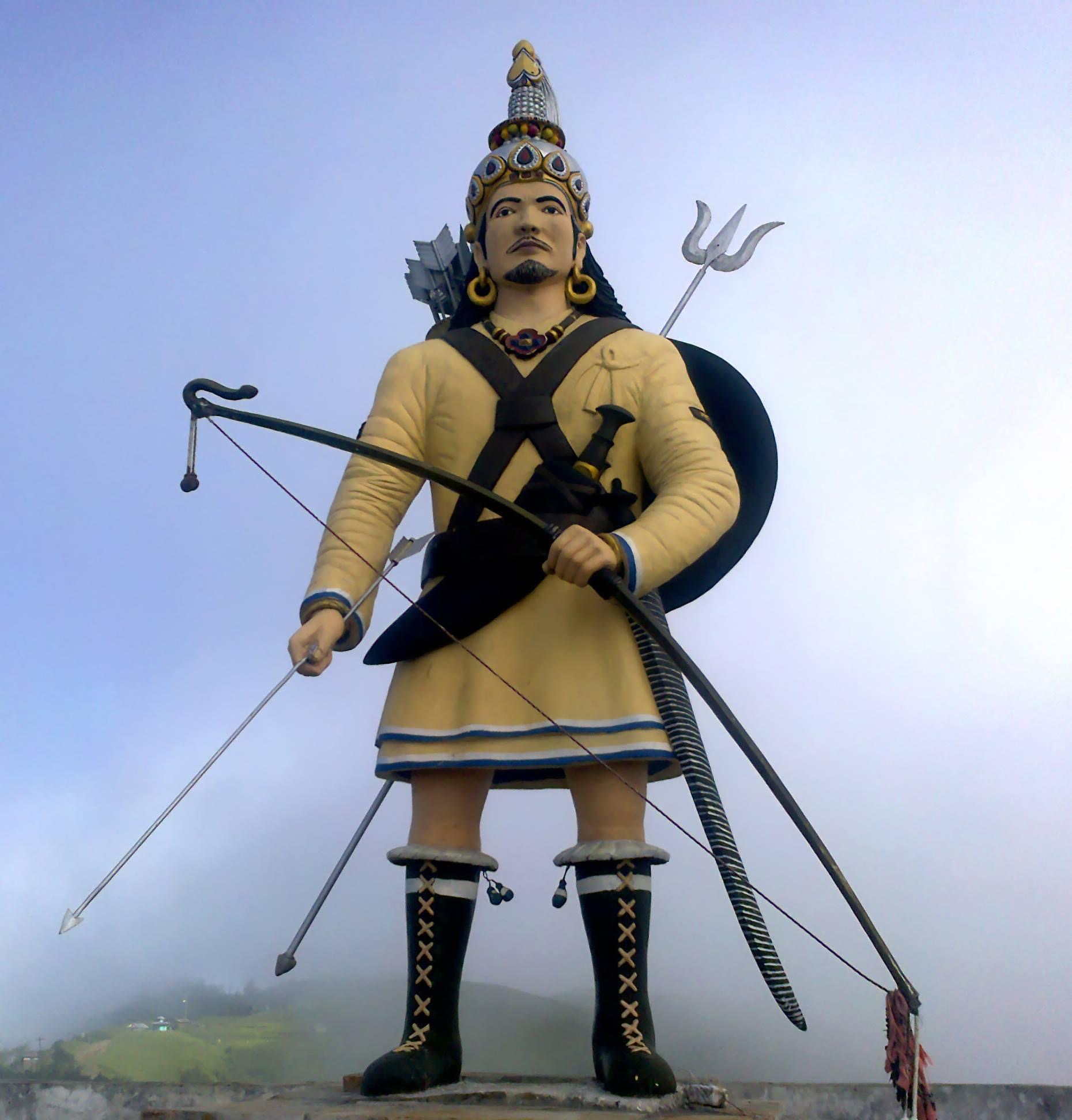
- Statue of king yalamber at Sankhuwasabha District
- Known for: First Kirat King of Nepal
- Predecessor: Bhuwan Singh (Last King of Mahispal dynasty)
- Successor: Palamba

Yalamber or Yalung, Yalambar, Yalamwar, Yalamver (Nepali: यलम्बर) was a warrior and first king of the Kirata kingdom in Nepal, which he established in 800 B.C. His capital was Yalakhom, present day Kathmandu Valley (Thankot) after conquering Central Nepal and his kingdom extended from river Trishuli in the west to river Teesta in the east of Bhutan. Brian Houghton Hodgson elaborated more on the origins.

The epic Mahabharata mentions the Kiratas as a tribe living in Himawat Khanda like the Pulindas and Chinas, Hunas, Pahlavas, Sakas, Yavanas, Savaras, Paundras, Kanchis, Dravidas, Sinhalas and Keralas. All these tribes were described as Mlechha tribes. The Kamvojas, Gandharas, Kiratas and Barbaras were also mentioned together as northern tribes. The Yavanas, the Kiratas, the Gandharvas, the Chinas, the Savaras, the Barbaras, the Sakas, the Tusharas, the Kankas, the Pathavas, the Andhras, the Madrakas, the Paundras, the Pulindas, the Ramathas, the Kamvojas were mentioned together as tribes beyond the kingdoms of Aryavarta.

In Nepal, Kirati king Yalambar, is believed to be the Barbarik of the Mahabharata, son of Ghatotkach and grandest son of Bheem. Barbarik had the dubious honor of being slain in the battle of the Mahabharata, in which gods and mortals fought alongside each other. Legend credits him with meeting Indra, the lord of heaven, who ventured into the Valley in human guise. It is said that during the battle of Mahabharata, Barbarik went to witness the battle with a vow to take the side of the losing party. Lord Krishna, knowing the vow of Barbarik and his strength of three arrows, thought that the war would end with only one survival and that is Barbarik himself by killing warriors of both sides. So, by a clever stroke of diplomacy, Lord Krishna cut off Barbarik's head. So, in his honor Indrajatra is celebrated and his head is worshipped as the god Akash Bhairav. Barbarik is also known as Khatushyam and Baliyadev in Rajasthan and Gujarat respectively.

His dynasty was succeeded by Licchavi (kingdom). His successors ruled Kathmandu valley for about 31 generations which lasted nearly 1225 years.

== See also ==
- Kirati people
- List of Kirati kings
