= Pashupati Aryaghat =

- Nepali: पशुपति को आर्य घाट
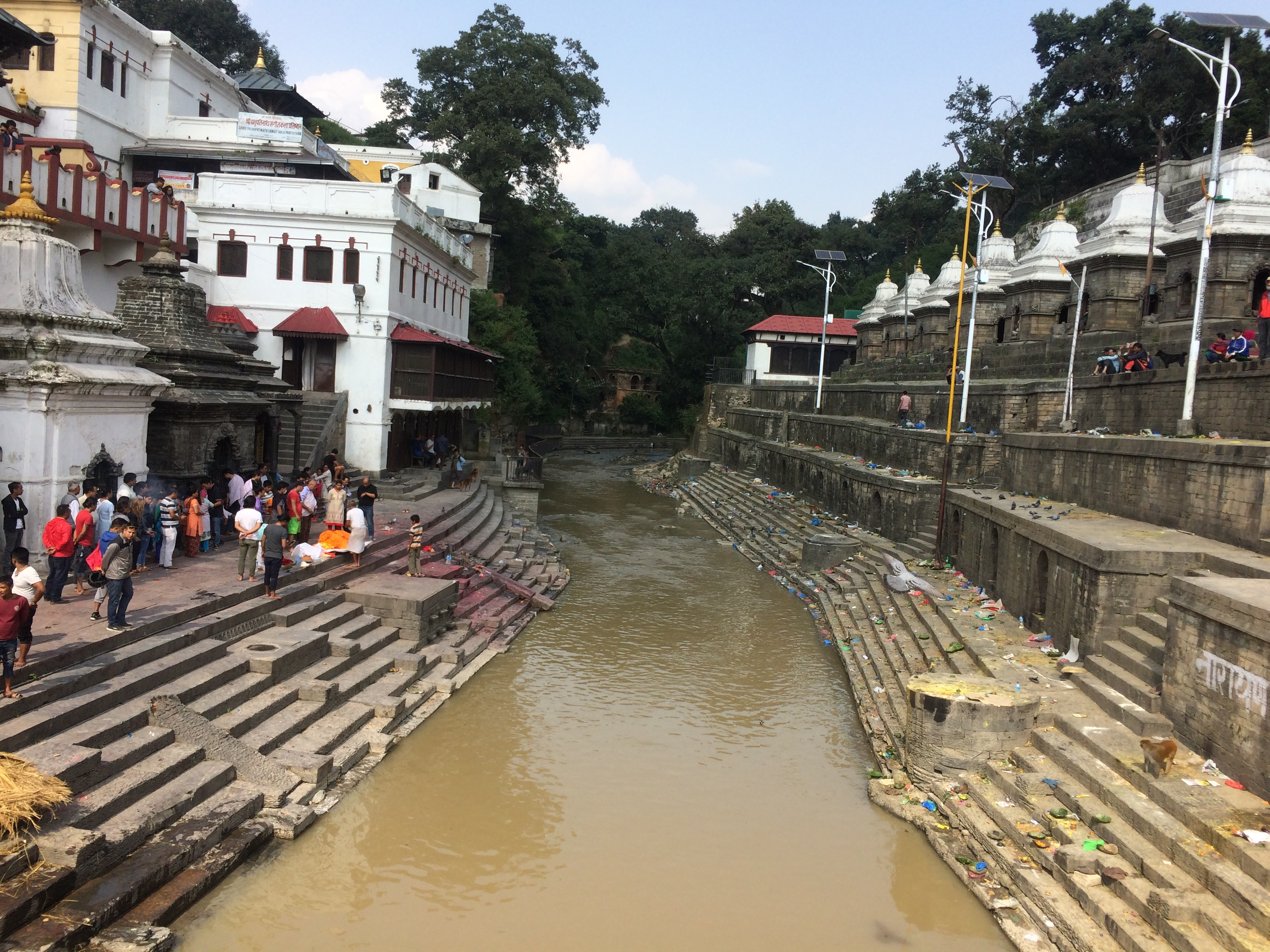

- Location within Bagmati Province Location within Nepal

Religion
- Affiliation: Hinduism
- District: Kathmandu District
- Province: Bagmati Province

Location
- Country: Nepal
- Interactive map of Pashupati Aryaghat
- Coordinates: 27.710292079805274°N 85.34909817233675°E

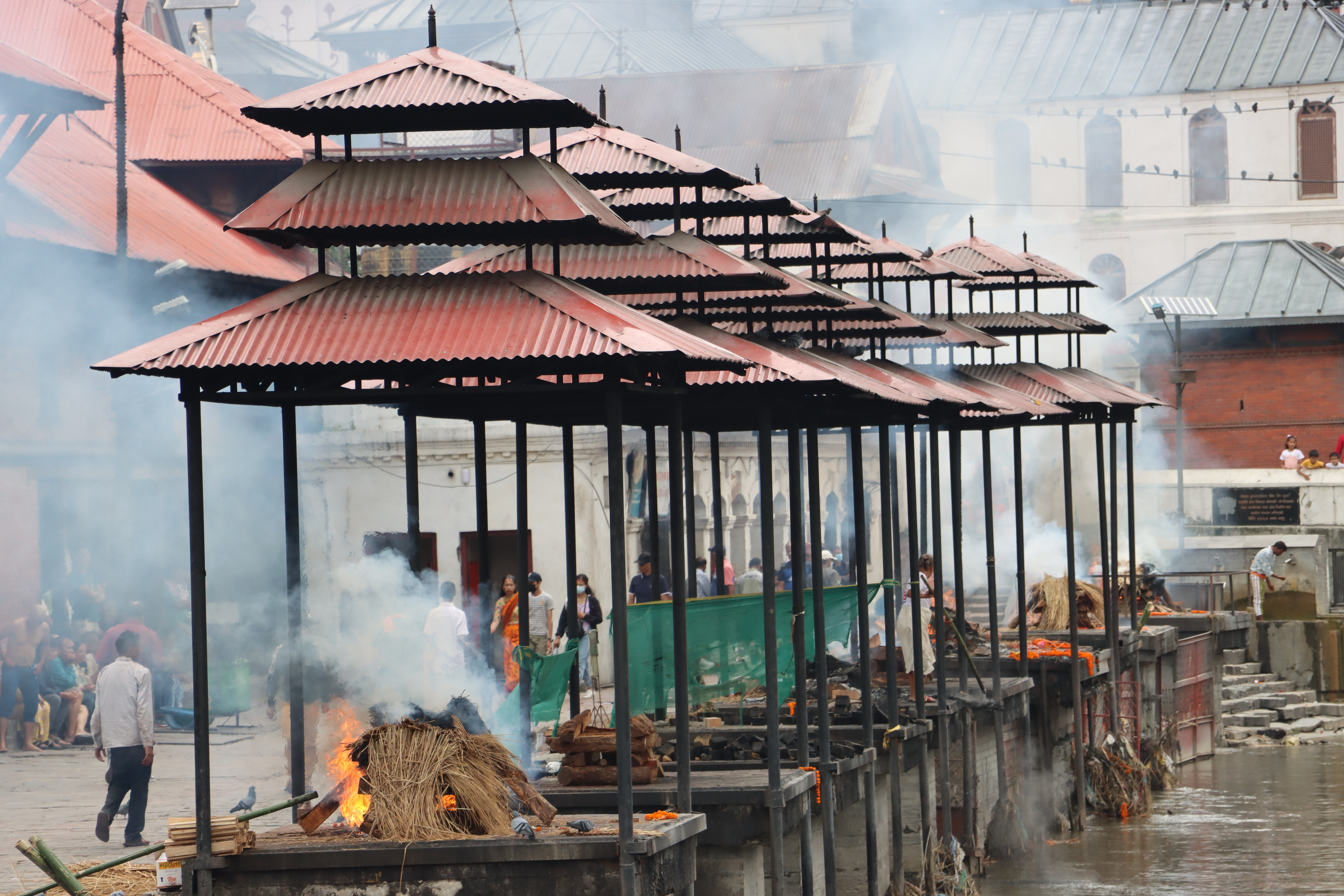
PC : Shuraj Thapaliya

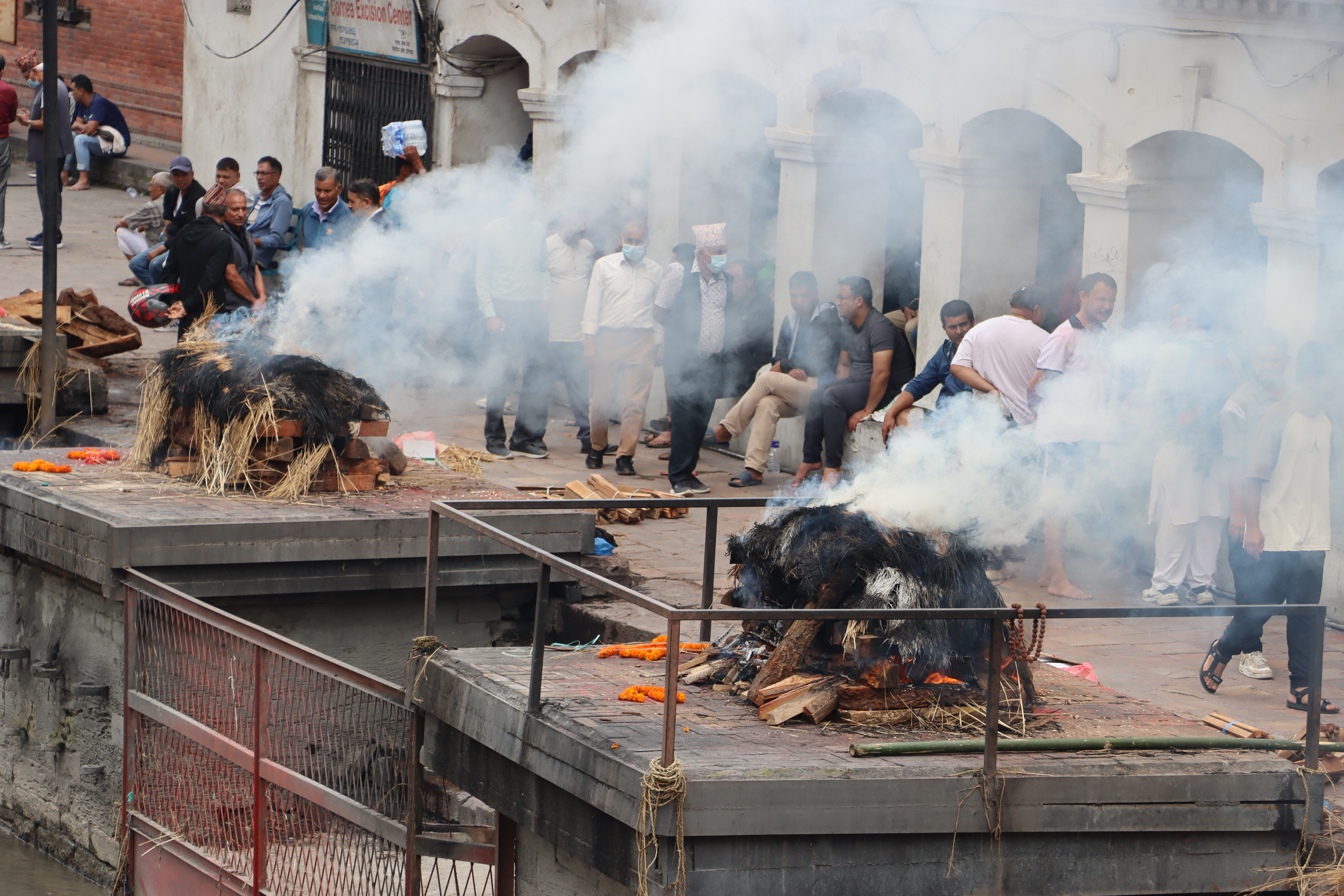
PC : Shuraj Thapaliya

Pashupati Aryaghat is a ghat located near Pashupatinath Temple, Kathmandu, Nepal. It is one of the most famous ghats in Nepal, notably used for open-air cremations, and also the site of an electronic crematorium.
