= Tamakoshi Rural Municipality =

Tamakoshi तामाकोशी गाउँपालिका
- Rural Municipality
- Location Tamakoshi (Nepal)
- Coordinates: 27.55°N 86.10°E
- Country: Nepal
- Province: Bagmati
- District: Dolakha
- Wards: 7
- Established: 10 March 2017

Government
  - Type: Rural Council
  - Chairperson: Mr. Prona Pratap K.C
  - Vice-chairperson: Mrs. Urmila Khadka (KC)

Area
  - Total: 153.06 km^{2} (59.10 sq mi)

Population (2011)
  - Total: 18,849
  - Density: 123.15/km^{2} (318.95/sq mi)
- Time zone: UTC+5:45 (Nepal Standard Time)
- Headquarter: Japhe
- Website: tamakoshimun.gov.np

Tamakoshi is a rural municipality located within the Dolakha District of the Bagmati Province of Nepal. The municipality spans 153.06 square kilometres (59.10 sq mi) of area, with a total population of 18,849 according to a 2011 Nepal census.

On March 10, 2017, the Government of Nepal restructured the local level bodies into 753 new local level structures. The previous Bhirkot, Jhule, Japhe, Malu, Sahare, Chyama and Hawa VDCs were merged to form Tamakoshi. Tamakoshi is divided into 7 wards, with Japhe declared the administrative center of the rural municipality.

== Demographics ==
At the time of the 2011 Nepal census, Tamakoshi Rural Municipality had a population of 18,849. Of these, 87.4% spoke Nepali, 5.3% Sunwar, 4.2% Tamang, 1.4% Sherpa, 0.9% Majhi, 0.2% Maithili, 0.2% Newar and 0.2% other languages as their first language.

In terms of ethnicity/caste, 43.2% were Chhetri, 19.0% Hill Brahmin, 6.6% Sarki, 6.0% Kami, 5.5% Sunuwar, 4.7% Newar, 4.4% Tamang, 3.0% Damai/Dholi, 2.3% Damai/Dholi, 1.4% Majhi, 1.4% Sherpa, 1.2% Sanyasi/Dasnami, 0.8% Magar, 0.2% Gurung, 0.1% Rai, 0.1% Thami and 0.3% others.

In terms of religion, 91.5% were Hindu, 5.5% Buddhist, 2.8% Christian and 0.1% others.

In terms of literacy, 66.6% could read and write, 3.6% could only read and 29.9% could neither read nor write.
