= Shailung Rural Municipality =

Shailung शैलुङ गाउँपालिका Sailung Bhanjyang
- Rural Municipality
- Location Shailung (Nepal)
- Coordinates: 27.63°N 85.98°E
- Country: Nepal
- Province: Bagmati
- District: Dolakha
- Wards: 8
- Established: 10 March 2017

Government
  - Type: Rural Council
  - Chairperson: Mr. Bharat Prasad Dulal
  - Vice-chairperson: Mrs. Lalmaya Yonjan (Ghising)

Area
  - Total: 96.30 km^{2} (37.18 sq mi)

Population (2011)
  - Total: 20,098
  - Density: 208.7/km^{2} (540.5/sq mi)
- Time zone: UTC+5:45 (Nepal Standard Time)
- Headquarter: Katakuti
- Website: shailungmun.gov.np

Shailung is a rural municipality located within the Dolakha District of the Bagmati Province of Nepal. The municipality spans 96.30 square kilometres (37.18 sq mi) of area, with a total population of 20,098 according to a 2011 Nepal census.

On March 10, 2017, the Government of Nepal restructured the local level bodies into 753 new local level structures. The previous Dudhpokhari, Bhusapheda, Magapauwa, Katakuti, Phasku and Shailungeshwar VDCs were merged to form Shailung. Shailung is divided into 8 wards, with Katakuti declared the administrative center of the rural municipality.

== Demographics ==
At the time of the 2011 Nepal census, Shailung Rural Municipality had a population of 19,698. Of these, 68.8% spoke Nepali, 30.6% Tamang, 0.1% Maithili, 0.1% Newar, 0.1% Sherpa and 0.2% other languages as their first language.

In terms of ethnicity/caste, 34.4% were Chhetri, 31.0% Tamang, 19.3% Newar, 5.0% Kami, 2.9% Hill Brahmin, 2.7% Magar, 1.6% Gharti/Bhujel, 1.5% Damai/Dholi, 0.7% Gurung, 0.2% Sanyasi/Dasnami, 0.2% Thami, 0.1% Badi, 0.1% Ghale, 0.1% Sarki, 0.1% Sherpa and 0.2% others.

In terms of religion, 65.6% were Hindu, 32.4% Buddhist, 1.9% Christian and 0.1% others.

In terms of literacy, 59.9% could read and write, 2.1% could only read and 38.0% could neither read nor write.
