= Baiteshwor Rural Municipality =

Baiteshwor वै,तेश्वर गाउँपालिका
- Rural Municipality
- Location Baiteshwor (Nepal)
- Coordinates: 27.64°N 86.15°E
- Country: Nepal
- Province: Bagmati
- District: Dolakha
- Wards: 8
- Established: 10 March 2017

Government
  - Type: Rural Council
  - Chairperson: Mr. Chhabi Lama
  - Vice-chairperson: Mrs. Kalpana Upreti

Area
  - Total: 80.41 km^{2} (31.05 sq mi)

Population (2011)
  - Total: 19,876
  - Density: 247.2/km^{2} (640.2/sq mi)
- Time zone: UTC+5:45 (Nepal Standard Time)
- Headquarter: Pandu, Namdu
- Website: baiteshwormun.gov.np

Baiteshwor is a rural municipality located within the Dolakha District of the Bagmati Province of Nepal. The municipality spans 80.41 square kilometres (31.05 sq mi) of area, with a total population of 19,876 according to a 2011 Nepal census.

On March 10, 2017, the Government of Nepal restructured the local level bodies into 753 new local level structures. The previous Gairimudi, Mirge, Kabhre, Namdu and Chhetrapa VDCs were merged to form Baiteshwor. Baiteshwor is divided into 8 wards, with Kabhre declared the administrative center of the rural municipality.

== Demographics ==
At the time of the 2011 Nepal census, Baiteshwor Rural Municipality had a population of 19,876. Of these, 71.3% spoke Nepali, 20.8% Tamang, 3.7% Newar, 2.1% Jirel, 1.4% Sherpa, 0.1% Magar, 0.1% Maithili, 0.1% Rai and 0.2% other languages as their first la|nguage.

In terms of ethnicity/caste, 30.1% were Chhetri, 21.1% Tamang, 17.2% Hill Brahmin, 9.2% Newar, 5.2% Sarki, 4.1% Damai/Dholi, 3.8% Kami, 2.6% Sanyasi/Dasnami, 2.3% Jirel, 1.4% Gharti/Bhujel, 1.4% Sherpa, 0.6% Thami, 0.4% Magar, 0.1% Badi, 0.1% Rai and 0.4% others.

In terms of religion, 73.9% were Hindu, 22.2% Buddhist, 2.2% Prakriti, 1.5% Christian and 0.2% others.

In terms of literacy, 63.0% could read and write, 3.5% could only read and 33.5% could neither read nor write.
