= Aqui Thami =

Thangmi artist and community organiser

Aqui Thami is a Thami artist, graphic designer and community organiser from Darjeeling, India. Her practice spans installation, drawing, printmaking, publishing, performance poster-making, zine creation, photography, publishing and socially engaged art.

She is the founder of Sister Library, a feminist community library and publishing initiative based in Mumbai, and a co-founder of Bombay Underground and Dharavi Art Room.

In 2023, she received the Hublot Design Prize in recognition of the social impact of her work.

== Early life and education ==
aqui Thami was born in Darjeeling, India, and belongs to the Thami people, an Indigenous community of the eastern Himalayas. She studied at the Tata Institute of Social Sciences.

== Career ==
aqui Thami works across installation, printmaking, artist books, publishing and participatory projects. Her work addresses themes including Indigenous identity, feminism, migration, labour and ecology.

She founded Sister Library, a feminist community library and publishing initiative based in Mumbai.

She is also a co-founder of Bombay Underground, an artist collective focused on independent publishing, and helped establish the Bombay Zine Fest.

Between 2018 and 2019, Thami was a V&A Research Institute (VARI) Offsite Artist in Residence at the Victoria and Albert Museum in London.

== Awards ==
- Hublot Design Prize (2023)
- Inlaks Fine Art Award (2018)
- Prince Claus Fund Next Generation Art Prize (2019)

== See also ==
- Social practice (art)
