= Bigu Rural Municipality =

Bigu बिगु
- Gaupalika
- Location in Nepal
- Coordinates: 27.84°N 86.06°E
- Country: Nepal
- Province: Bagmati Province
- District: Dolakha District

Population (1991)
  - Total: 1,736
- Time zone: UTC+5:45 (Nepal Time)
- Website: https://bigumun.gov.np/

Bigu is a former village development committee that is now a ward-7 rural municipality in Dolakha District in Bagmati Province of northeastern Nepal. At the 1991 Nepal census, Bigu had a population of 1,736 people living in 361 individual households.

The epicenter of the May 2015 Nepal earthquake was located in Bigu.

== Demographics ==
At the time of the 2011 Nepal census, Bigu Rural Municipality had a population of 18,592. Of these, 42.6% spoke Nepali, 28.8% Tamang, 18.5% Thangmi, 8.0% Sherpa, 1.3% Magar, 0.2% Maithili, 0.2% Newar, 0.1% Bhojpuri, 0.1% Gurung and 0.1% other languages as their first language.

In terms of ethnicity/caste, 29.1% were Tamang, 21.7% Chhetri, 19.0% Thami, 8.1% Sherpa, 5.8% Newar, 4.7% Kami, 3.0% Magar, 2.7% Hill Brahmin, 1.9% Damai/Dholi, 1.4% Gharti/Bhujel, 0.9% Sarki, 0.7% Gurung, 0.4% Thakuri, 0.1% Hajjam/Thakur, 0.1% Koiri/Kushwaha, 0.1% Sunuwar and 0.3% others.

In terms of religion, 42.5% were Hindu, 39.0% Buddhist, 17.4% Prakriti, 0.9% Christian and 0.1% others.

In terms of literacy, 58.3% could read and write, 3.1% could only read and 38.5% could neither read nor write.
