= Tamakoshi =

Tamakoshi may refer to:

- Hiroyuki Tamakoshi, a Japanese manga artist
- Tamakoshi, a rural municipality in Nepal
- Tamakoshi River, a river in Nepal
