= Pikey Peak =

Mountain in Nepal

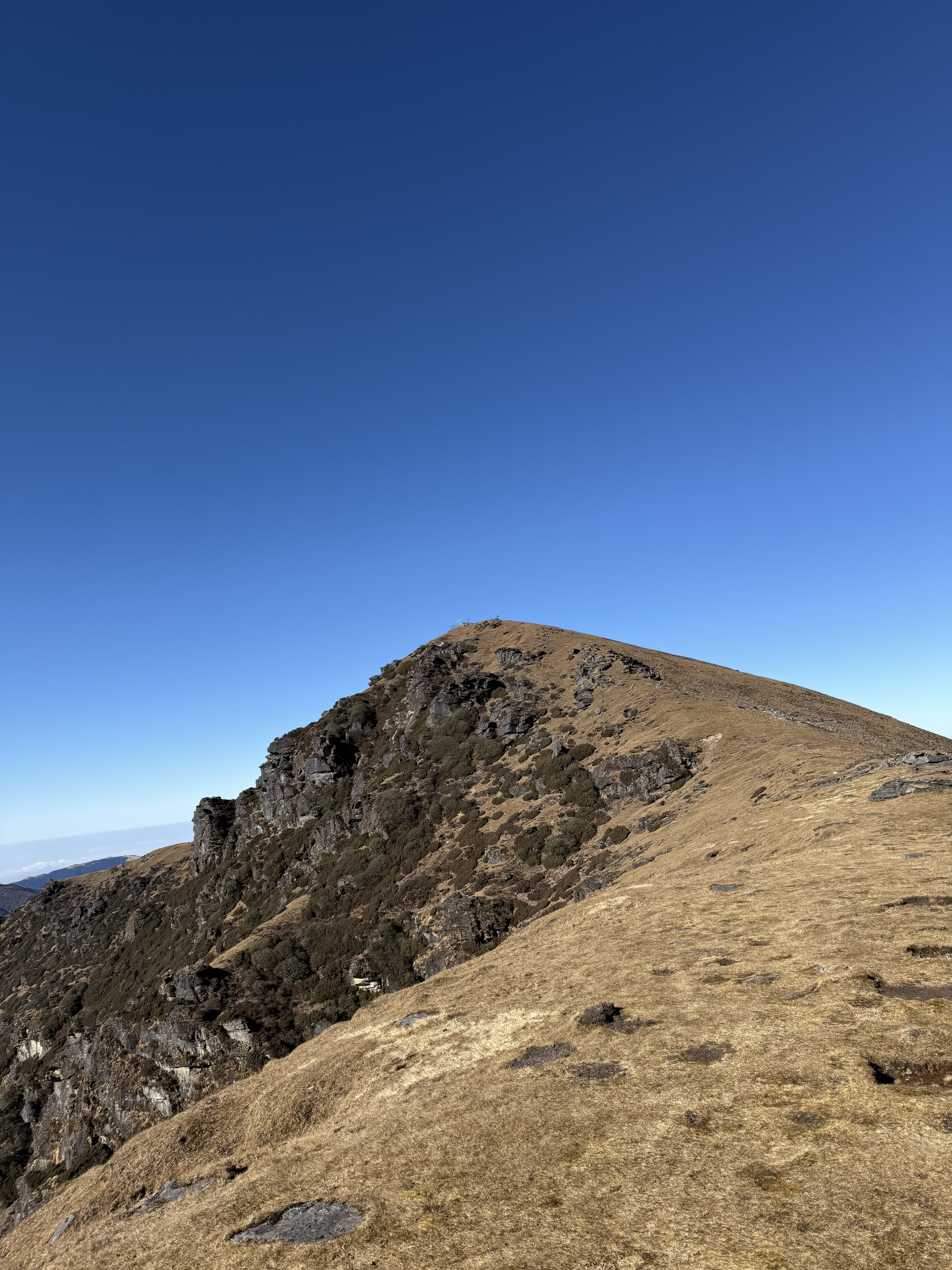
- Summit of Pikey Peak seen from the west

Highest point
- Elevation: 4,065 m (13,337 ft)
- Coordinates: 27°31′57.1″N 86°28′21.9″E

Geography

Pikey Peak is a 4,065 metres (13,337 ft) high mountain in the Solukhumbu District of Nepal. A clear day on the summit provides a view of multiple 8,000 m peaks, including what is said to have been Edmund Hillary's favorite view of Everest.

Trekkers may approach Pikey from the south beginning in Dhap and passing through Jhapre. An approach from the west may commence at either Jiri or Shivalaya, passing through Deurali, Tallo Bandhar, and Goli Gumba along the way.
