= Sureti =

Coordinates: 27°43′N 86°11′E

Sureti सुरेटी
- Village development committee
- Interactive map of Sureti
- Country: Nepal
- Zone: Janakpur Zone
- District: Dolakha District

Population (1991)
  - Total: 2,844
- Time zone: UTC+5:45 (Nepal Time)

Sureti is a village development committee in Dolakha District in the Janakpur Zone of north-eastern Nepal. At the time of the 1991 Nepal census it had a population of 2,844 people living in 600 individual households.
