= Khare, Nepal =

Khare, Nepal खरे
- Village development committee
- Location in Nepal
- Coordinates: 27.83°N 86.30°E
- Country: Nepal
- Zone: Janakpur Zone
- District: Dolakha District

Population (1991)
  - Total: 1,887
- Time zone: UTC+5:45 (Nepal Time)

Khare is a village development committee in Dolakha District in the Janakpur Zone of north-eastern Nepal. The village has 19 Wards, which are the functional unit of the village development committee. At the time of the 1991 Nepal census it had a population of 1,887 people living in 387 individual households.
