= Bocha, Nepal =

Boch, Nepal बोच
- Village development committee
- Location in Nepal
- Coordinates: 27.71°N 85.99°E
- Country: Nepal
- Zone: Janakpur Zone
- District: Dolakha District

Population (1991)
  - Total: 2,945
- Time zone: UTC+5:45 (Nepal Time)

Boch बोच (formerly Village Development Committee), Nepal is a Ward of Bhimeshwor Municipality in Dolakha District in the Janakpur Zone of north-eastern Nepal. At the time of the 1991 Nepal census it had a population of 2,945 people living in 638 individual households.
