= Khupachagu =

Khupachagu खुपाचागु
- Village development committee
- Interactive map of Khupachagu
- Country: Nepal
- Zone: Janakpur Zone
- District: Dolakha District

Population (1991)
  - Total: 1,479
- Time zone: UTC+5:45 (Nepal Time)

Khupachagu is a village development committee in Dolakha District in the Janakpur Zone of north-eastern Nepal. At the time of the 1991 Nepal census it had a population of 1,479 people living in 310 individual households.
