= Jiri =

Jiri जिरी
- municipality
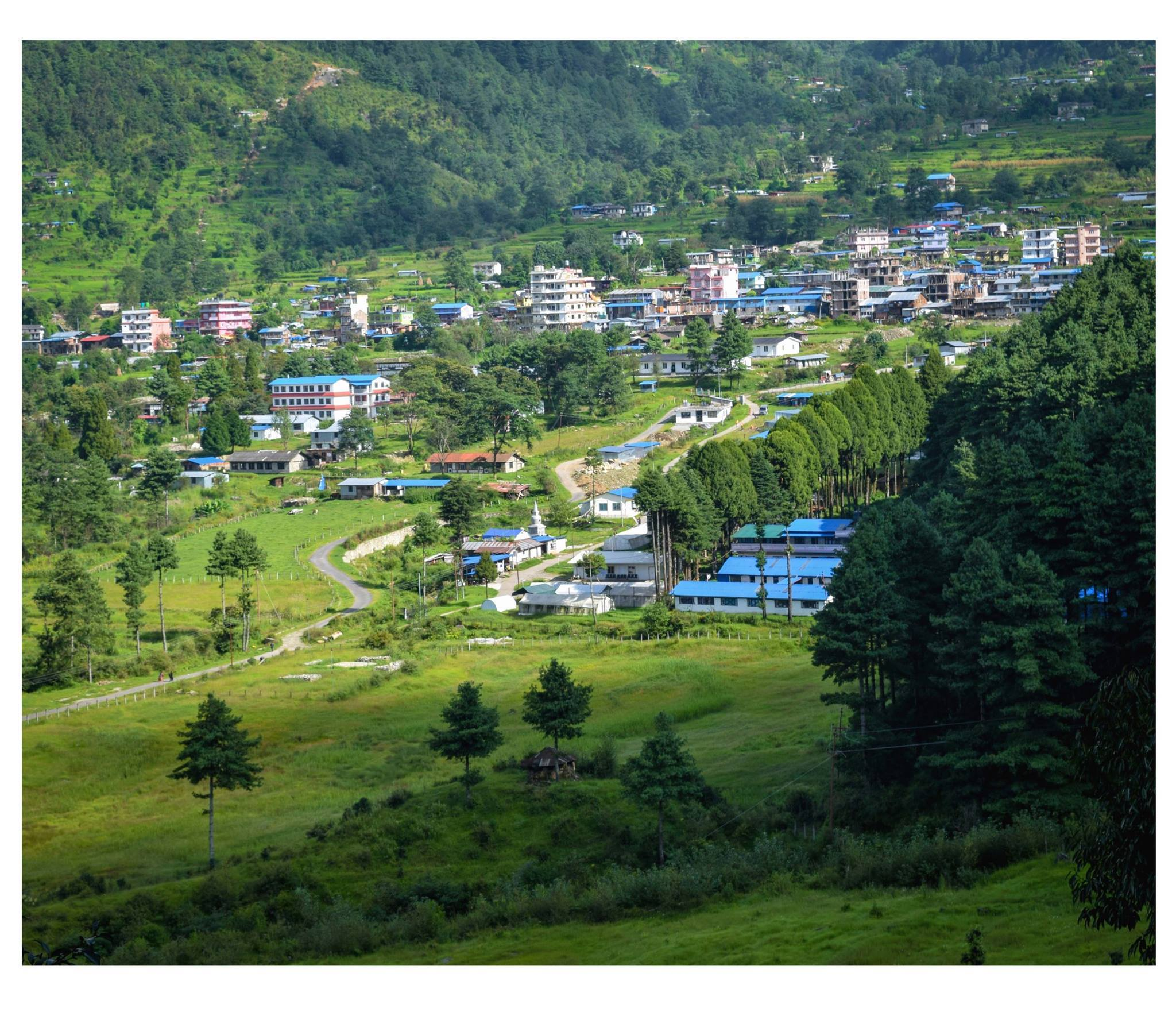
- Jiri
- Nickname: Switzerland of Nepal
- Interactive map of Jiri
- Location in Nepal
- Coordinates: 27°38′N 86°14′E
- Country: Nepal
- Province: Bagmati
- District: Dolakha
- No of wards: 9

Government
  - Mayor: Mitra Bahadur Jirel
  - Deputy Mayor: Krishnamaya Budhathoki

Area
  - Total: 211.27 km^{2} (81.57 sq mi)

Population (2021)
  - Total: 16,109
  - Density: 76.248/km^{2} (197.48/sq mi)
- Time zone: UTC+5:45 (NST)
- Website: www.jirimun.gov.np

Jiri (Nepali: जिरी) is a municipality in Dolakha District in the Bagmati Province of central Nepal. At the time of the 2011 Nepal census it had a population of 13,938 people. Jiri, which lies about 190 kilometers from Kathmandu, is the main gateway to the Everest region. Almost all the Everest expeditions, including the one led by famous climber John Hunt, and including Edmund Hillary, had passed through Jiri. A company of the Nepal Army is stationed in town and visitors' equipment and backpacks might be searched. There are a number of lodges available along either side of the main road, mainly in Jiri Bazaar.

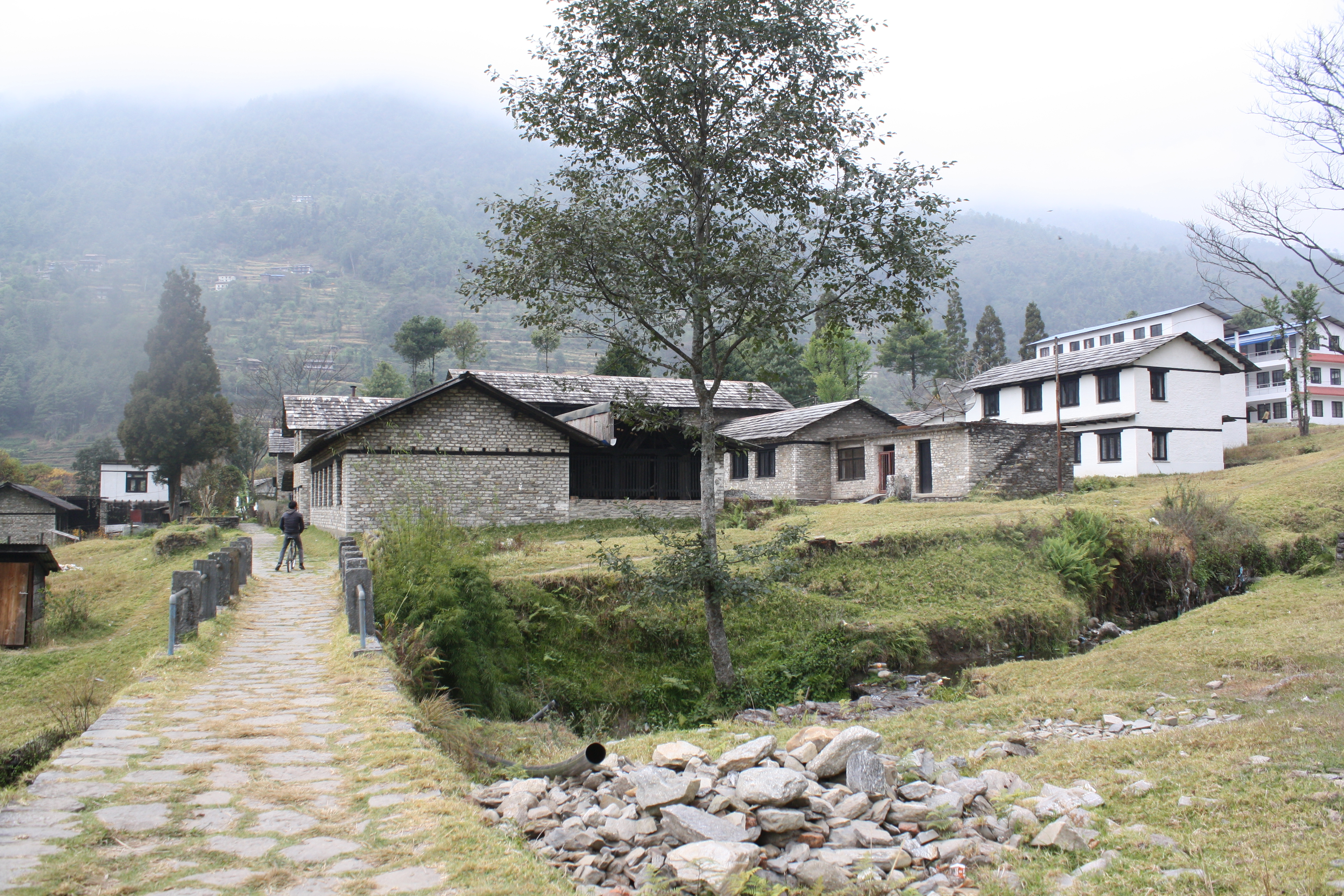
Building Architecture of Jiri

There are two government high schools, namely Jiri Higher Secondary School at Hatanda and Dhungeshwori Secondary School at Jiri Bazaar. One private boarding school called JEM Academy, two community schools, namely Martyrs Memorial School and Saraswoti Community School. There is a technical school called Jiri Technical School which provides technical education regarding agriculture, construction, and health.

Jiri was set up as an agricultural development center by the Swiss Government Aid in 1938.

As the closest road head, Jiri is the trailhead for many treks into the Mount Everest region. The trek to Lukla takes seven or eight days. Few people begin a trek from Jiri, and only 5% of all trekkers who attempt the difficult trek to the Everest Base Camp start at Jiri. The other 95% choose to fly into the small airstrip at Lukla, thus cutting off a week of difficult but beautiful trekking.

Although the trailhead from Jiri to Sagarmatha National Park is referred to as the "classic route to Everest", the original trailhead began at Kathmandu. All early Everest expeditions—including the one led by John Hunt that put Tenzing Norgay and Edmund Hillary on the summit—passed through Jiri. So Jiri is also called the "Gateway to Mt. Everest".

It is proud to shout that Jiri is the land of ethnic people called the Jirels. They love themselves, called Jiriba. In the Jirel language Zi means bright or life, Ri means mountain or hill, and Ba means people. Thus, Jiriba means people from the bright or life mountain. The Jirel mountain climber, Lal Bahadur Jirel, who scaled Everest two times, come from this place.

Besides, Jiri is one of the best tourist destinations in Nepal. Jiri is known for the natural beauty often called the Switzerland (Zurich) of Nepal. It is also a place of pilgrims where there are Holy Shrines like Jireswory Rambule Losa Monastery, Yarlung Monastery, etcThere are many parks. Gurans Park, Buddha Park, Tony Heigan Park, Hillary Park, Stone Park etc., are some of the best Natural Parks. Jiri is also famous for tall peaks lol me Pangchhyomu, Hanumante, Cherdung, etc. Panch Pkhari is another destination close by. to Jiri. Municipality is rich in cultural heritage, where numerous castes live in harmony and brotherhood. Probably the tallest statue of Guru Rimpochhe is about to be completed.

== Demographics ==
At the time of the 2011 Nepal census, Jiri Municipality had a population of 15,837. Of these, 43.9% spoke Nepali, 21.4% Jirel, 16.8% Sherpa, 10.6% Tamang, 4.6% Sunwar, 1.7% Newar, 0.4% Maithili, 0.1% Gurung, 0.1% Magar, 0.1% Rai, 0.1% Tharu, and 0.2% other languages as their first language.

In terms of ethnicity/caste, 28.1% were Chhetri, 21.7% Jirel, 18.0% Sherpa, 11.3% Tamang, 4.9% Newar, 4.8% Sunuwar, 4.0% Kami, 2.6% Damai/Dholi, 2.4% Hill Brahmin, 0.5% Gharti/Bhujel, 0.3% Gurung, 0.3% Rai, 0.3% Sanyasi/Dasnami, 0.1% Magar, 0.1% Teli, 0.1% Tharu, 0.1% Yadav and 0.4% others.

In terms of religion, 47.3% were Hindu, 29.0% Buddhist, 20.0% Prakriti, and 3.6% Christian.

In terms of literacy, 61.5% could read and write, 2.4% could only read, and 36.0% could neither read nor write.

== Climate ==
Climate data for Jiri, elevation 1,877 m (6,158 ft), (1991–2020 normals, extremes 1966–2018)
Month	Jan	Feb	Mar	Apr	May	Jun	Jul	Aug	Sep	Oct	Nov	Dec	Year
Record high °C (°F)	23.5 (74.3)	24.5 (76.1)	26.8 (80.2)	28.6 (83.5)	28.9 (84.0)	29.2 (84.6)	28.5 (83.3)	27.5 (81.5)	29.0 (84.2)	26.5 (79.7)	25.0 (77.0)	22.0 (71.6)	29.2 (84.6)
Mean daily maximum °C (°F)	14.4 (57.9)	16.5 (61.7)	19.7 (67.5)	22.4 (72.3)	23.6 (74.5)	24.5 (76.1)	24.2 (75.6)	24.3 (75.7)	23.7 (74.7)	21.8 (71.2)	18.5 (65.3)	15.2 (59.4)	20.5 (68.9)
Daily mean °C (°F)	6.4 (43.5)	8.6 (47.5)	11.7 (53.1)	14.7 (58.5)	17.4 (63.3)	20.1 (68.2)	20.7 (69.3)	20.6 (69.1)	19.5 (67.1)	15.6 (60.1)	11.1 (52.0)	7.6 (45.7)	14.5 (58.1)
Mean daily minimum °C (°F)	−1.7 (28.9)	0.7 (33.3)	3.6 (38.5)	7.0 (44.6)	11.2 (52.2)	15.6 (60.1)	17.2 (63.0)	16.9 (62.4)	15.3 (59.5)	9.4 (48.9)	3.6 (38.5)	−0.4 (31.3)	8.2 (46.8)
Record low °C (°F)	−7.5 (18.5)	−6.4 (20.5)	−3.5 (25.7)	−1.8 (28.8)	0.0 (32.0)	7.5 (45.5)	10.4 (50.7)	9.0 (48.2)	7.6 (45.7)	0.8 (33.4)	−4.5 (23.9)	−7.0 (19.4)	−7.5 (18.5)
Average precipitation mm (inches)	17.3 (0.68)	26.3 (1.04)	47.6 (1.87)	100.5 (3.96)	180.4 (7.10)	379.3 (14.93)	637.4 (25.09)	645.3 (25.41)	349.5 (13.76)	73.7 (2.90)	10.6 (0.42)	7.2 (0.28)	2,475.1 (97.44)
Source: Department of Hydrology and Meteorology

== Attractions ==
=== Cherdung ===
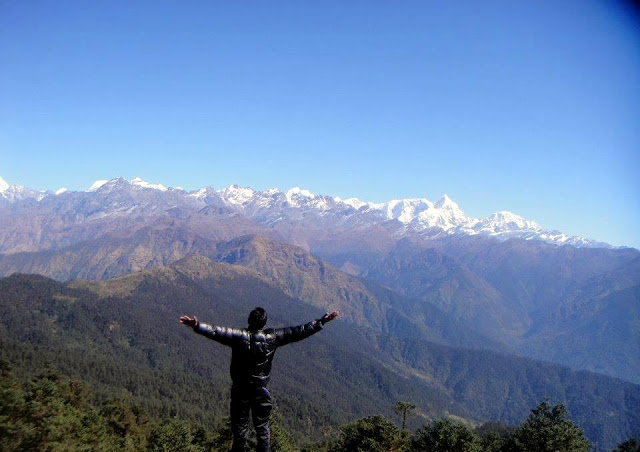
View of the Himalayas from top of Cherdung

Cherdung Danda is at an altitude of 3200m above sea level and takes 6 hours of hiking from Jiri's Linkan Bazar to reach there.

=== Kalo Bhir ===
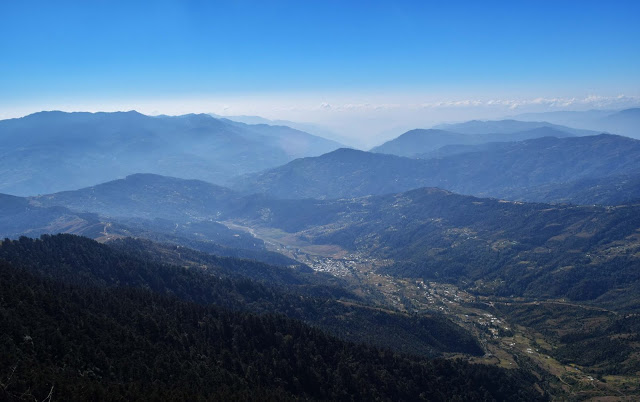
View from the top of Kalo Bhir

Kalo Bhir is located on the way to Cherdung. From Kalo Bhir, three major towns, Charikot, Dolakha, and Jiri can be seen in a single sight. It is a massive piece of rock, standing on the top of a cliff, one can hardly stand on the top due to its steep landscape and powerful wind. It is 4 4-hour walk up hill from Jiri, Linkan Bazar.

=== Ramite Danda ===
Formerly, this hill was known as Rang-rang cliff or Bhir. Later teenagers loved to call it Ramite Danda. But now the statue of Tony Began is newly erected, and this place is named Tony Began Park. It is an hour uphill walk to the northeast from Linkan Bazar. There is a shelter for visitors. Drinking water supply is provided. This place is also known for cookouts.

=== Jiri Fish Pond ===
Jiri's heart, Linkan Bazaar is one of the biggest towns in Dolakha district. Shops on both sides of road is not just what you see in Linkan, but you can also visit Jiri Technical School, Boudha Stupa and statue of Rimporche, Jiri Hospital and so on.

== Gallery ==
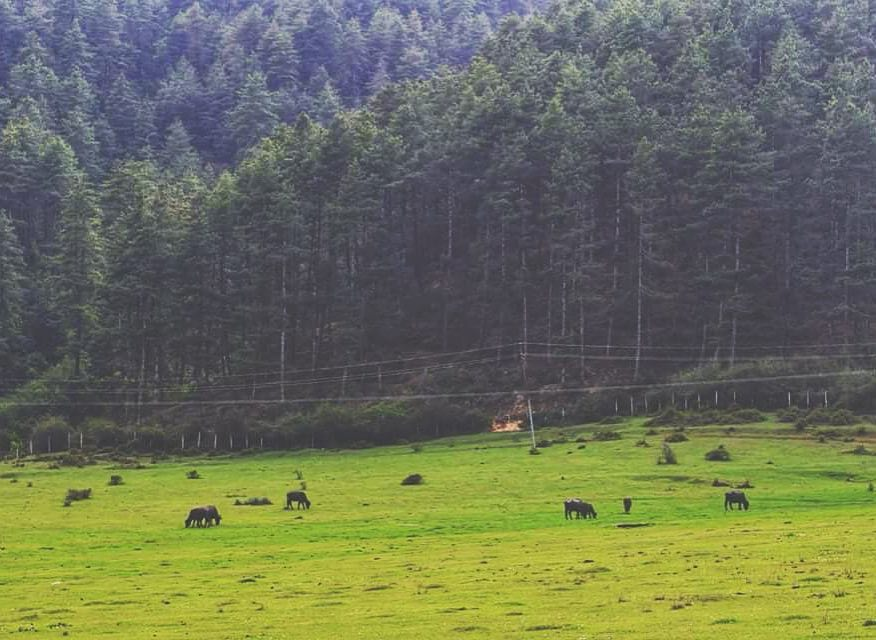
Jiri, Nepal 2019

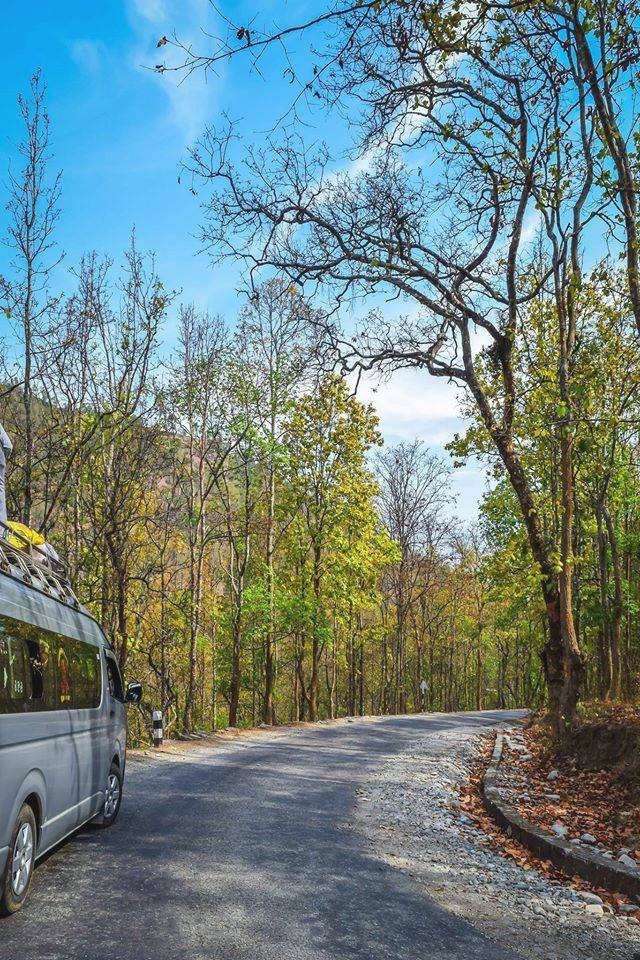
Road to Jiri in Dolakha District

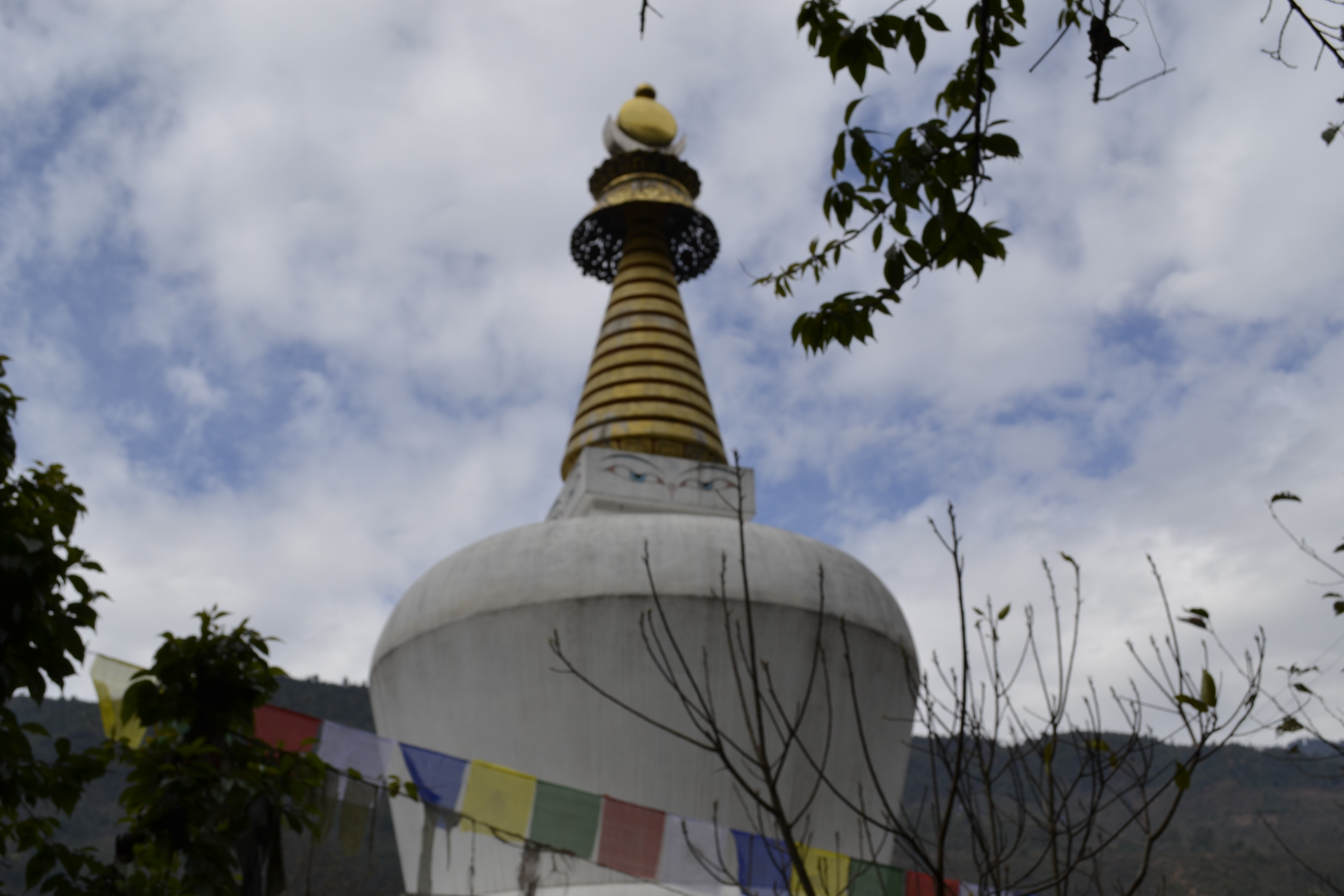
Stupa in jiri

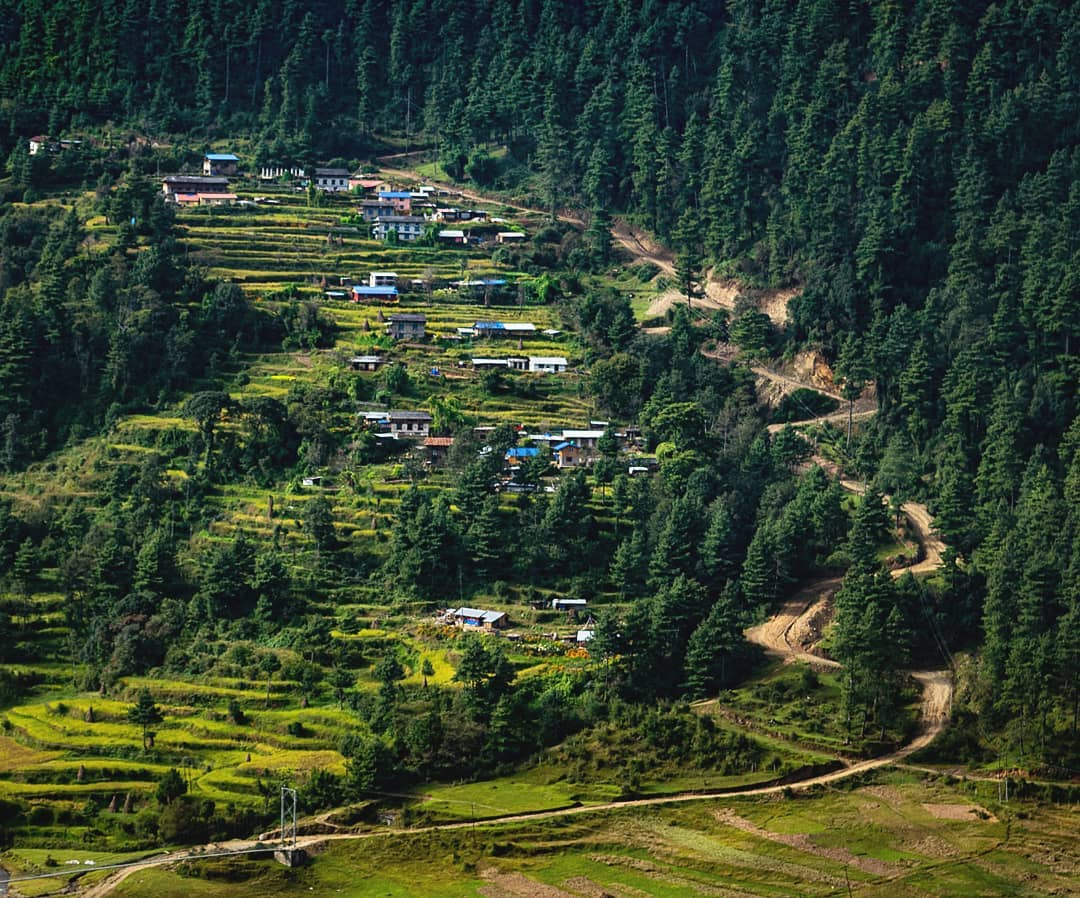
Jirel Village

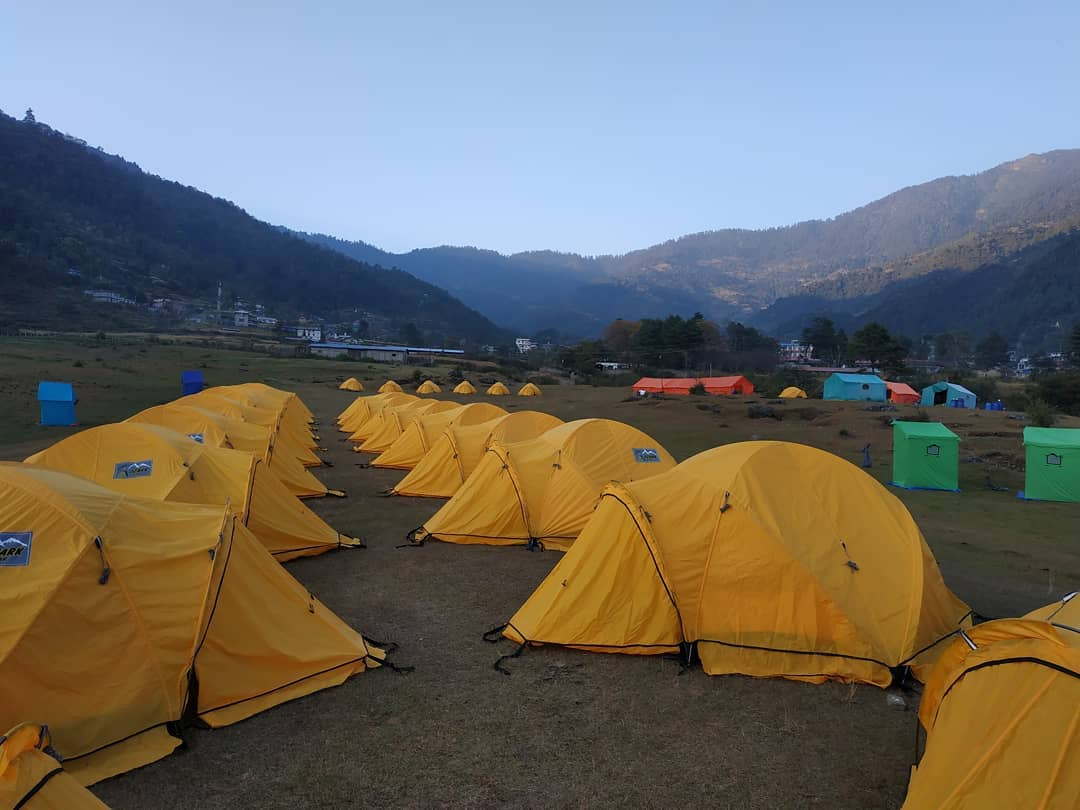
Camping for the participants of Everest Trail Marathon 2018

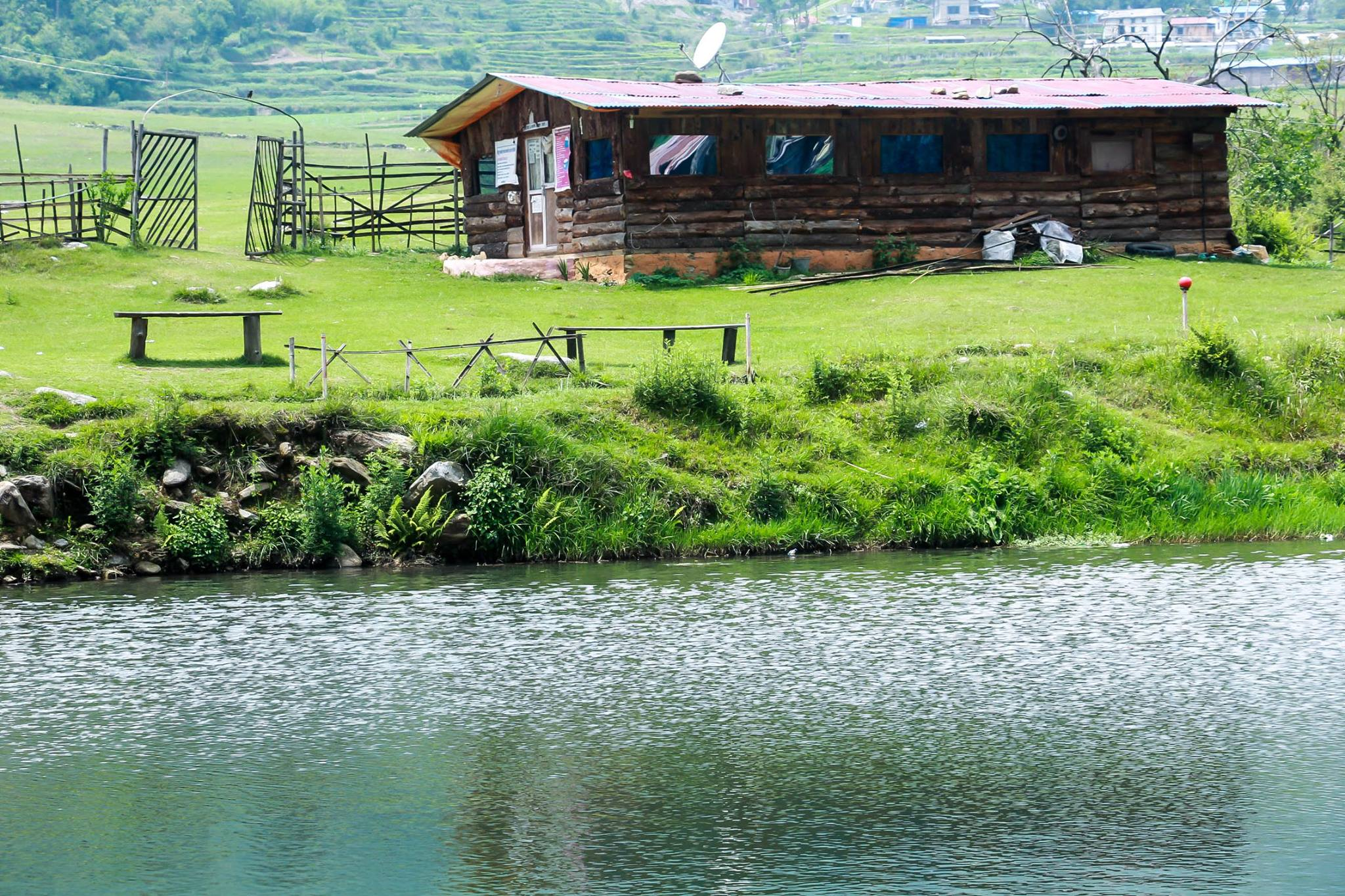
Fish Farm in Jiri

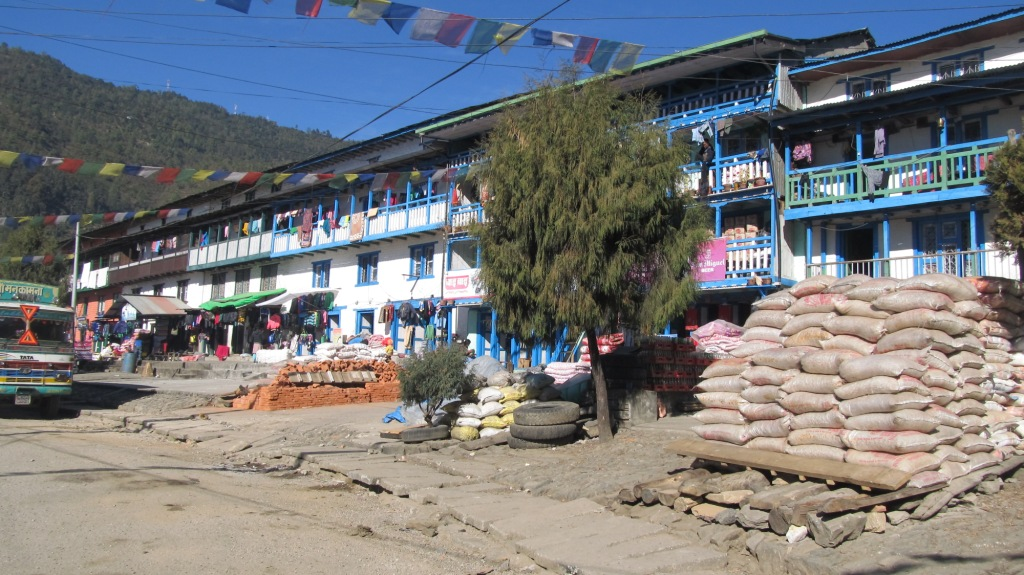
Jiri village

== See also ==
- List of cities in Nepal
