= Lakuri Danda =

Lakuri Danda लाँकुरीडाँडा
- Village development committee
- Location in Nepal
- Coordinates: 27.42°N 85.57°E
- Country: Nepal
- Zone: Janakpur Zone
- District: Dolakha District

Population (1991)
  - Total: 3,456
- Time zone: UTC+5:45 (Nepal Time)

Lakuri Danda is a village development committee in Dolakha District in the Bagmati Zone of north-eastern Nepal. At the time of the 1991 Nepal census it had a population of 3,456 people living in 689 individual households.
