= Alampu =

Place in Nepal

Alampu आलाम्पु
- Village development committee
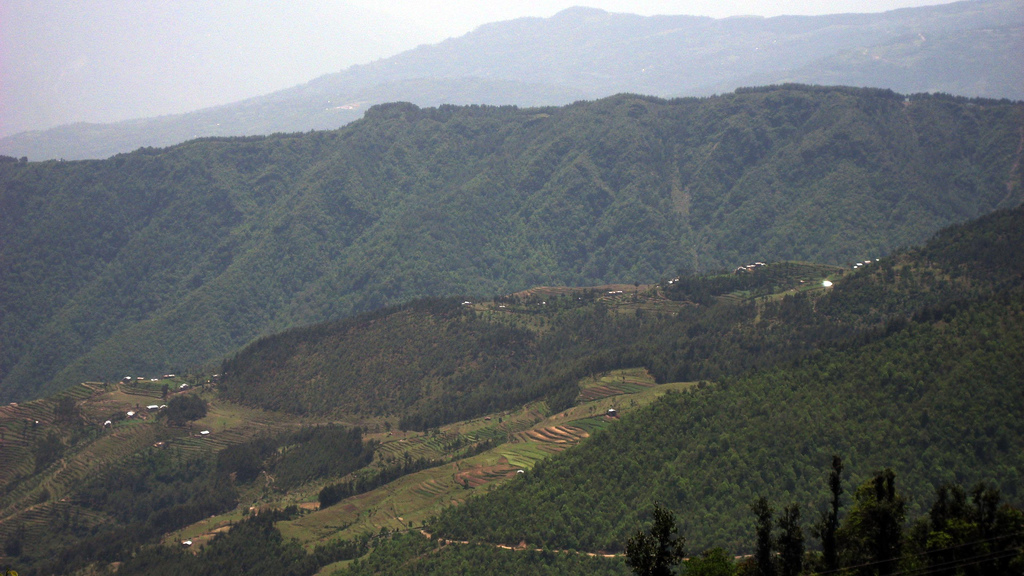
- alampu village

- Location in Nepal
- Coordinates: 27.77°N 86.12°E
- Country: Nepal
- Zone: Janakpur Zone
- District: Dolakha District

Population (1991)
  - Total: 3,392
- Time zone: UTC+5:45 (Nepal Time)

Alampu (Nepali: आलाम्पु) is a village development committee in Dolakha District in the Janakpur Zone of north-eastern Nepal. At the time of the 1991 Nepal census it had a population of 3,392 people living in 739 individual households.
