= Dolakha District =

Coordinates: 27°40′N 86°2′E

Dolakha District दोलखा
- District
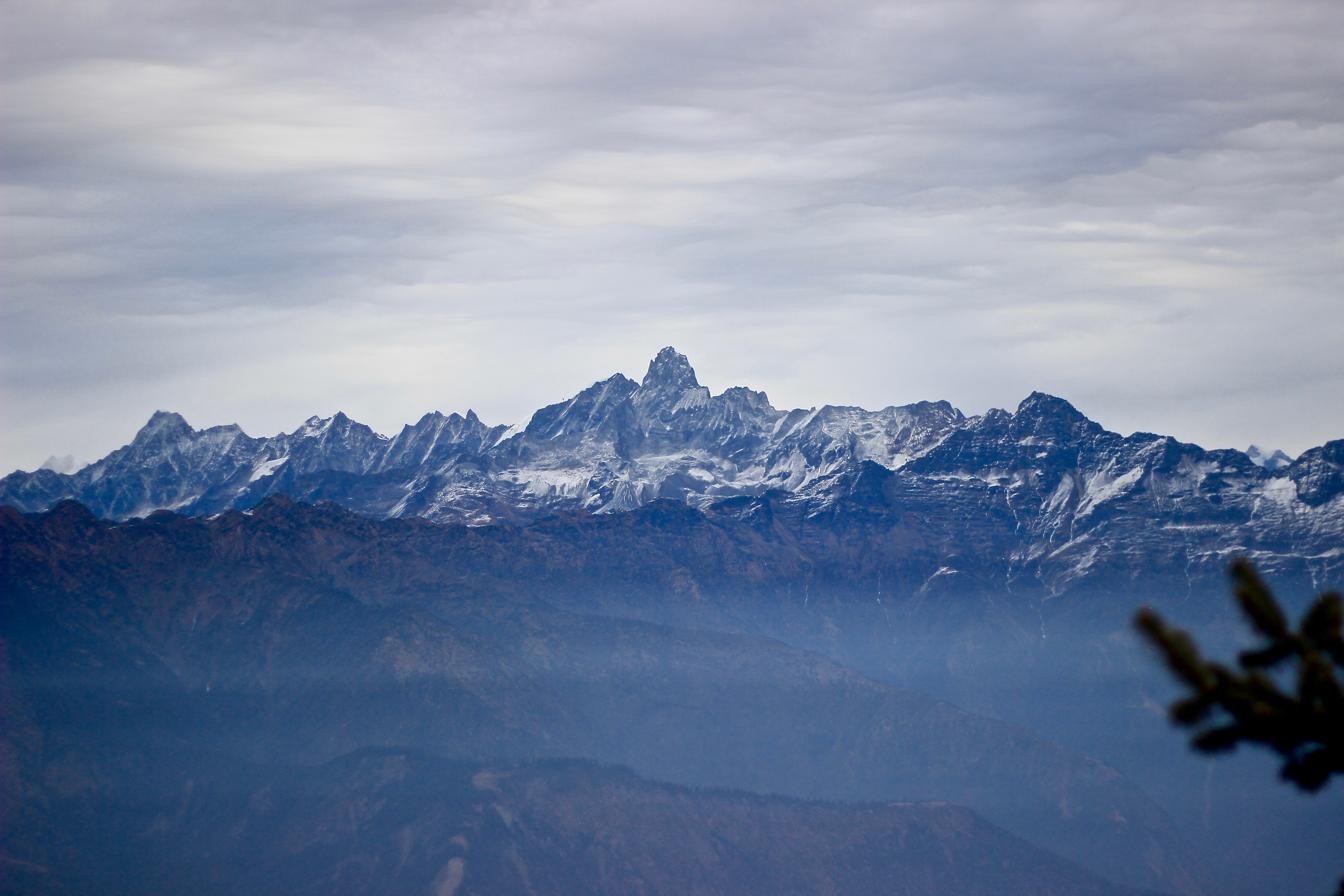
- Mount Chhobo Bamare

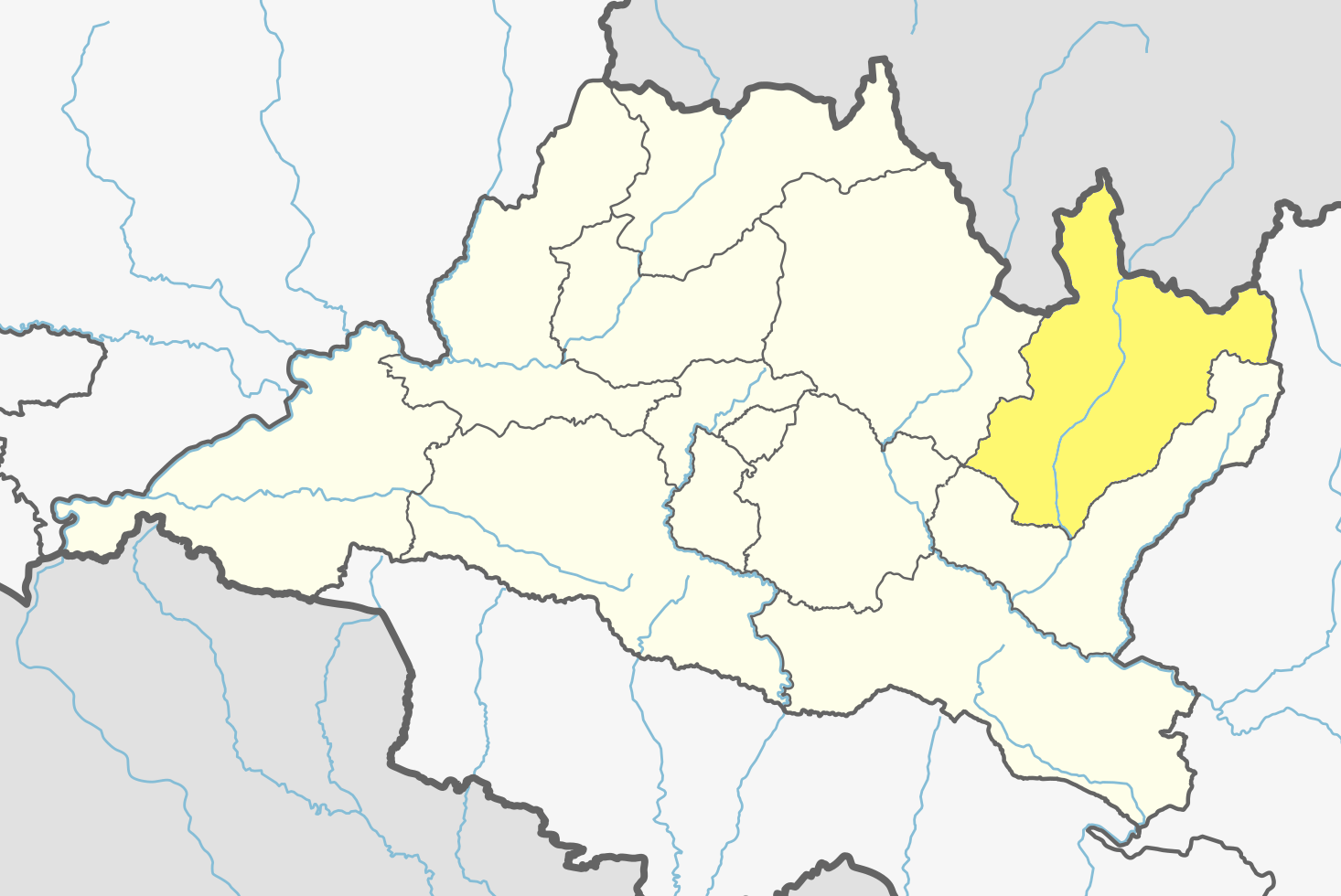
- Location of district in Bagmati Province
- Country: Nepal
- Province: Bagmati Province
- Admin HQ.: Charikot (Bhimeshwar and namdu

Government
  - Type: Coordination committee
  - Body: DCC, Dolakha

Area
  - Total: 2,191 km^{2} (846 sq mi)

Population (2011)
  - Total: 186,557
  - Density: 85.15/km^{2} (220.5/sq mi)
- Time zone: UTC+05:45 (NPT)
- Postal Codes: 1457
- Main Language(s): Dolkhali Nepal Bhasa
- Website: www.ddcdolakha.gov.np

Dolakha, often known as Dolkha or Dholkha (Nepal Bhasa:दोलखा जिल्ला)), a part of Bagmati Province, is one of the seventy-seven districts of Nepal. The district, with Charikot as its district headquarters, covers an area of 2,191 km^{2} (846 sq mi) and had a population of 204,229 in 2001 and 186,557 in 2011. The Dolkha postal code begins from 45500 and the main headquarters is in Dolkha. The administrative center of this district consists of 11 post offices. It is a district with a strong religious affiliation and is popularly known amongst most Nepalese for the temple of Dolakha Bhimeshawor.

The name Dolkha arose from Newar Community. In the classical Nepal Bhasa language "Dol" or "Dwāl" means Thousand, and "Khā" means houses which means "The place that has a thousand houses"..

== Bhimeshwar Temple ==
The Bhimeshwar temple is located in Dolakha Bazar of Bhimeshwar. The main statue of this temple is God Bhim. Bhimsen, Bhimeshwar, or Bhim of Dolakha is noted as one of the most popular throughout the country. He was the second prince of Panch Pandav and was notably worshipped by the traders or merchandisers as their god. In Dolakha, the roofless temple constitutes the idol of Bhimsen, which is triangular and made of rough stone. The idol in the temple is said to resemble three different gods: Bhimeshwar in the morning, Mahadeva during the day and the Narayana in the evening.

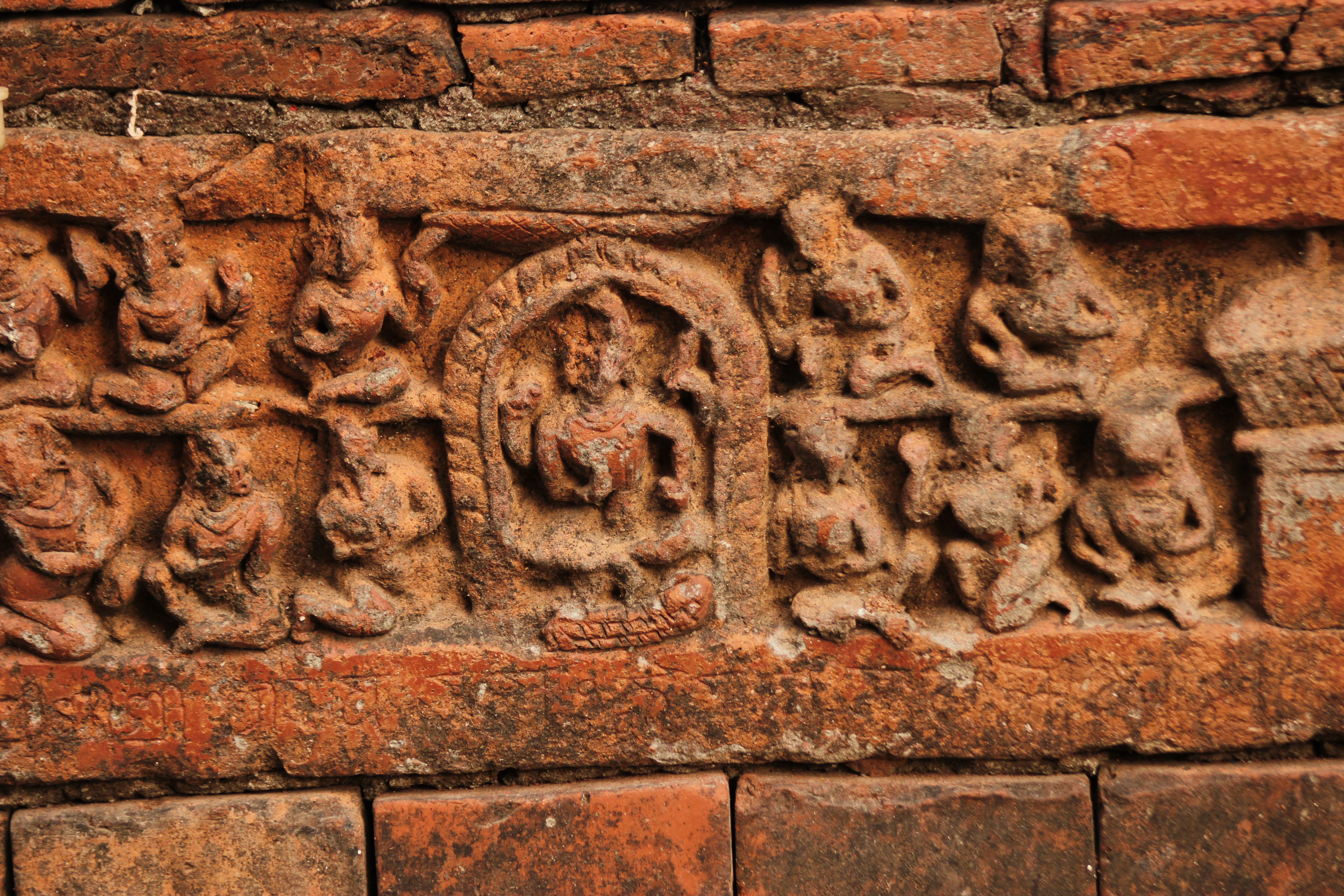
Terracotta Art

Local legend has it that ages ago, 12 porters coming from elsewhere stopped at this spot and made three stone stoves to cook rice. After a few minutes, it was noticed that one side of the rice grains was cooked but the other side was raw. When the Porter flipped the cooked side up, the cooked rice became raw again when it came in contact with the triangular-shaped black-stone. One of the porters became very angry and stabbed the stone with "Paneu" (laddle), which cut the stone and out of the cut flowed blood coated with milk. Later they realized that the stone was God Bhim. Worshippers started pouring in to pray to God Bhim. There are many faith-challenging incidents about the Bhimsen of Dolakha. The miraculous things of Bhimsen statue of Dolakha include sweating fluid like drops of warm water. People believe that if any bad incident is happening or going to happen soon in the country then Bhimsen himself tries to protect his people by warning them through sweating etc.

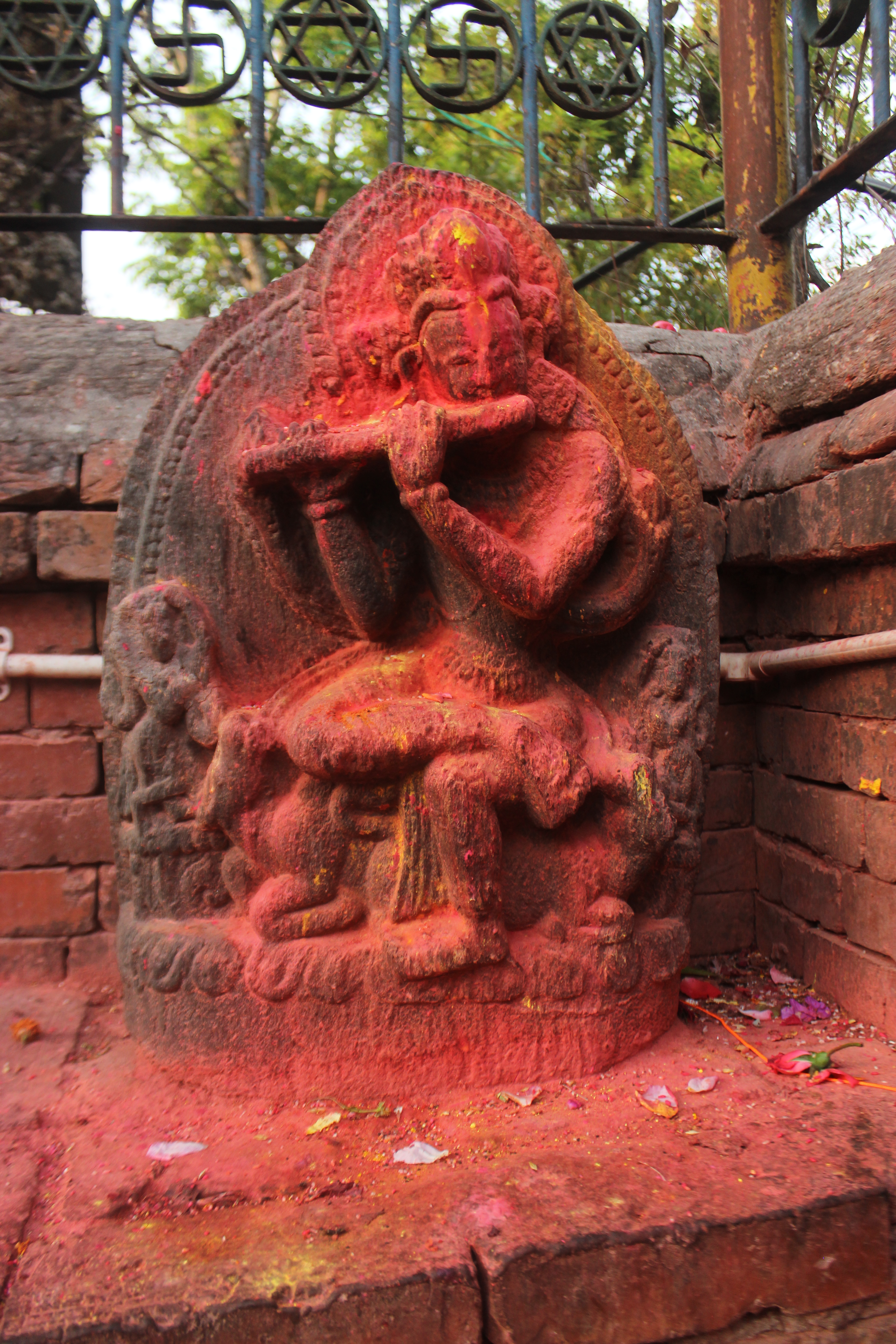
Shree Krishna

From the point of view of Shree Bhimeshwar Shivapuran, there was a kingdom of Bhima that was blessed by God Brahma at the side of a mountain peak. The people, who lived in the Bhima's kingdom had to live very sorrowful lives from the Bhima and so they prayed to god Shiva to save their lives. Then God Shiva came from Gaurishanker and killed the king Bhima. According to history after Bhima's death, the statue of God at that spot was named -Bhimeshwar (भिमेश्वर).

Dolakha is also home to another holy temple - Kalinchowk Bhagawati. It is situated in high mountains at an altitude of about 3842m and the pilgrims are known to walk a long and dangerous route via the mountains to the temple. But, in 2018 the government started a new cable car service for the comfort of the pilgrims. The temple is believed to have strong spiritual power and is known to fulfil the prayers of the pilgrims.

== Geography and climate ==
Climate Zone	Elevation Range	% of Area
Upper Tropical	300 to 1,000 meters 1,000 to 3,300 ft.	1.9%
Subtropical	1,000 to 2,000 meters 3,300 to 6,600 ft.	26.2%
Temperate	2,000 to 3,000 meters 6,400 to 9,800 ft.	28.5%
Subalpine	3,000 to 4,000 meters 9,800 to 13,100 ft.	16.6%
Alpine	4,000 to 5,000 meters 13,100 to 16,400 ft.	9.4%
Nival	above 5,000 meters	17.4%

== Demographics ==
Historical population
Census year	Pop.	±% p.a.
1981	150,576	—
1991	173,236	+1.41%
2001	204,229	+1.66%
2011	186,557	−0.90%
2021	172,726	−0.77%
Source: Citypopulation

At the time of the 2021 Nepal census, Dolakha District had a population of 172,767. 6.89% of the population is under 5 years of age. It has a literacy rate of 72.31% and a sex ratio of 1064 females per 1000 males. 50,821 (29.42%) lived in municipalities.

Castes/ethnic groups in Dolakha District (2021)
1. Chhetri (31.2%)
2. Tamang (17.6%)
3. Thami (10.5%)
4. Newar (9.11%)
5. Bahun (7.54%)
6. Sherpa (5.49%)
7. Kami (4.19%)
8. Jirel (2.60%)
9. Sarki (2.20%)
10. Damai (2.15%)
11. Magar (1.73%)
12. Bhujel (1.40%)
13. Sunuwar (1.12%)
14. Other Khas non-Dalit (1.31%)
15. Other Hill Janjati (1.16%)
16. Others (0.65%)

Ethnicity wise: Khas people were the largest group, making up nearly 49% of the population. Hill Janjatis were the second-largest group, making up 42% of the population. Tamangs were the largest Hill Janjati group, while the Thami were the second-largest group.

Languages of Dolakha district (2021)
1. Nepali (62.2%)
2. Tamang (16.6%)
3. Thami (9.04%)
4. Sherpa (4.89%)
5. Jirel (2.41%)
6. Nepal Bhasha (2.27%)
7. Sunuwar (1.03%)
8. Others (1.56%)

As their first language, 62.20% of the population spoke Nepali, 16.60% Tamang, 9.04% Thami, 4.89% Sherpa, 2.41% Jirel, 2.27% Newari and 1.03% Sunuwar as their first language. In 2011, 65.2% of the population spoke Nepali as their first language.

Religion in Dolakha District (2021)
Religion	Percent
Hinduism	66.47%
Buddhism	26.00%
Kirat Mundhum	5.39%
Christianity	2.05%
Other or not stated	0.09%

Religion: 66.47% were Hindu, 26.00% Buddhist, 5.39% Kirati, 2.05% Christian and 0.09% others.

== Administration ==
The district consists of 9 Municipalities, out of which two are urban municipalities and seven are rural municipalities. These are as follows:

- Bhimeswor Municipality
- Jiri Municipality
- Kalinchok Rural Municipality
- Melung Rural Municipality
- Bigu Rural Municipality
- Gaurishankar Rural Municipality
- Baiteshwor Rural Municipality
- Sailung Rural Municipality
- Tamakoshi Rural Municipality

=== Former Municipalities and Village Development Committees (VDCs) ===
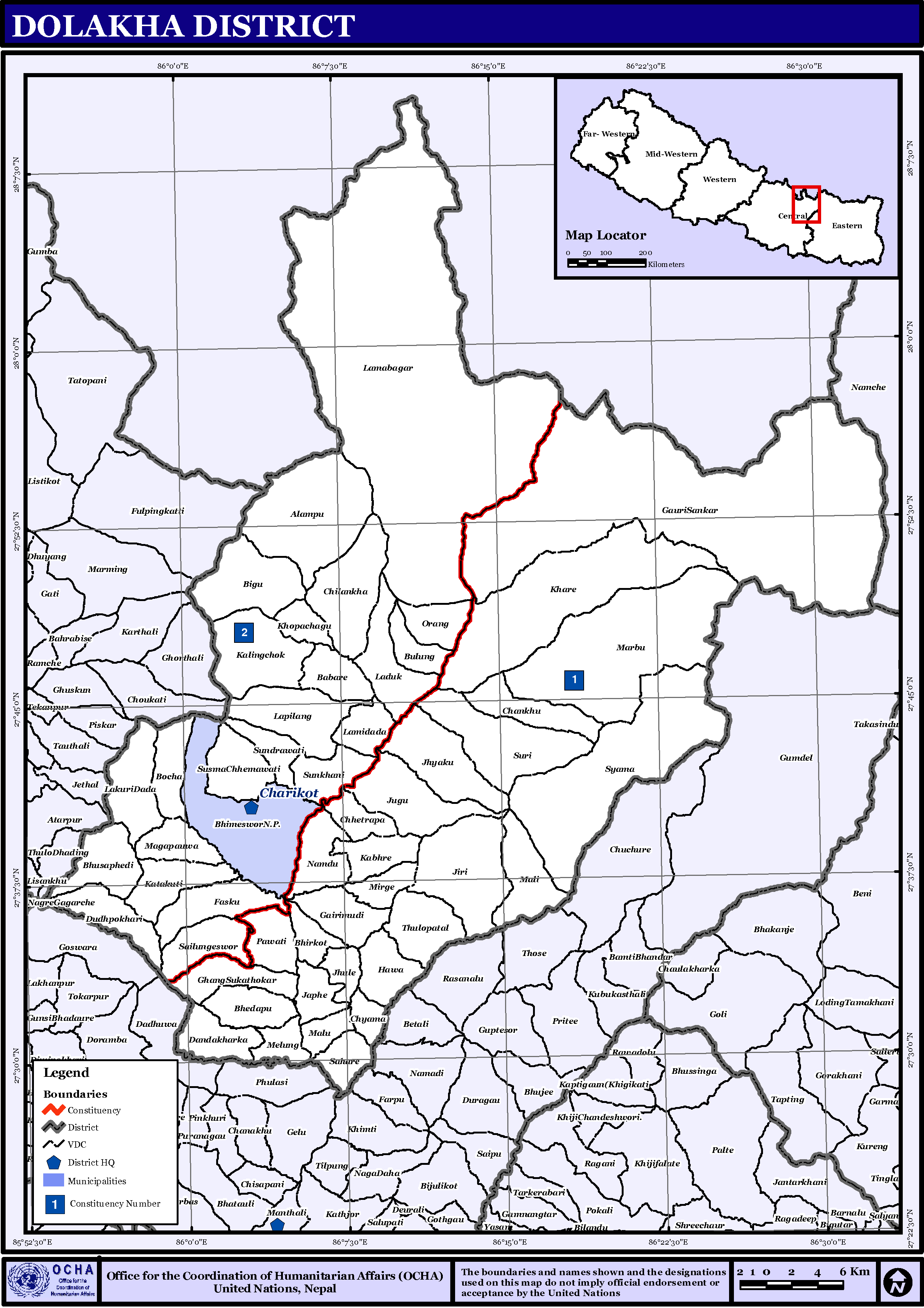
Map of the VDCs in Dolakha District

Prior to the restructuring of the district, Dolakha consisted of the following municipalities and Village development committees:

- Alampu
- Babare
- Bhedapu
- Bhimeshwar Municipality
- Bhirkot
- Bhusapheda
- Bigu
- Bocha
- Bulung
- Chankhu
- Chhetrapa
- Chilankha
- Chyama
- Dadhpokhari
- Dandakharka
- Dolakha Town
- Gairimudi
- Gauri Sankar
- Ghang Sukathokar
- Hawa
- Japhe
- Jhule
- Jhyaku
- Jiri Municipality
- Jugu
- Kabhre
- Kalinchok
- Katakuti
- Khare
- Khupachagu
- Laduk
- Lakuri Danda
- Lamabagar
- Lamidanda
- Lapilang
- Magapauwa
- Makaibari
- Mali, now Jiri Mun.
- Malu
- Marbu
- Mati
- Melung
- Mirge
- Namdu
- Orang
- Pawati
- Phasku
- Sahare
- Shailungeshwar
- Sunakhani
- Sundrawati
- Suri
- Susma Chhemawati
- Syama
- Thulopatal, now Jiri Mun.

== Gallery ==
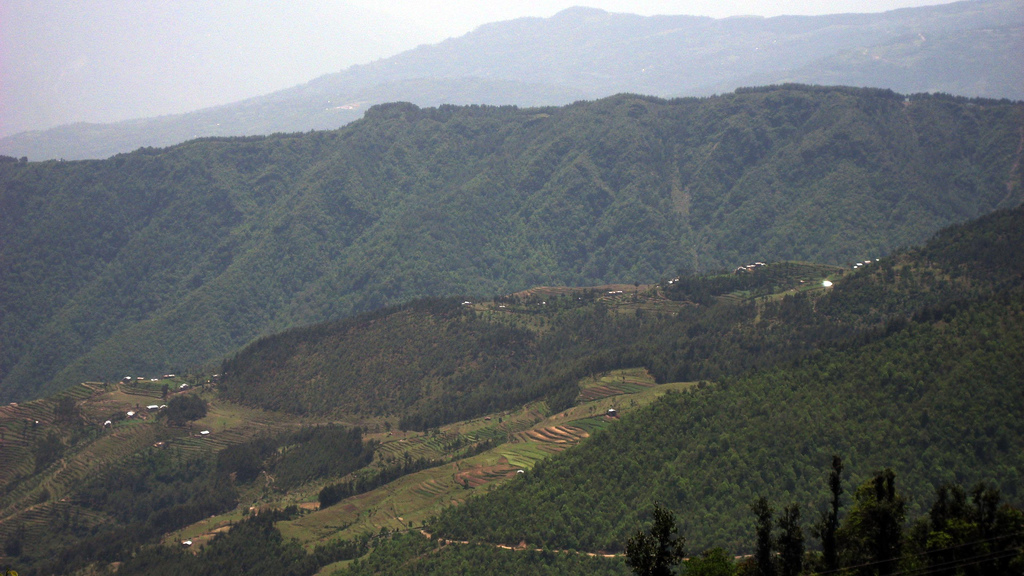
Near Charikot

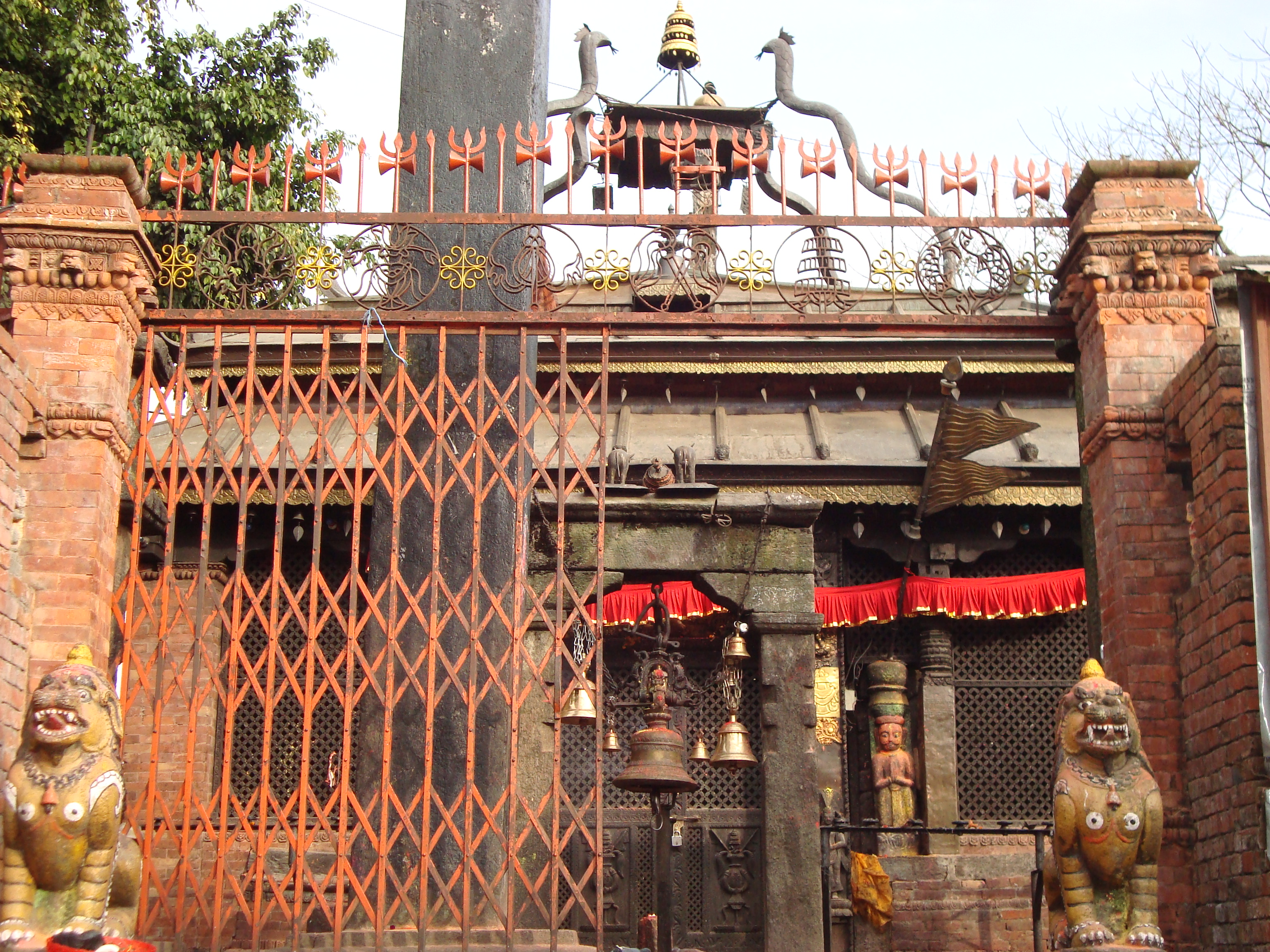
Dolakha Bhimsen Temple

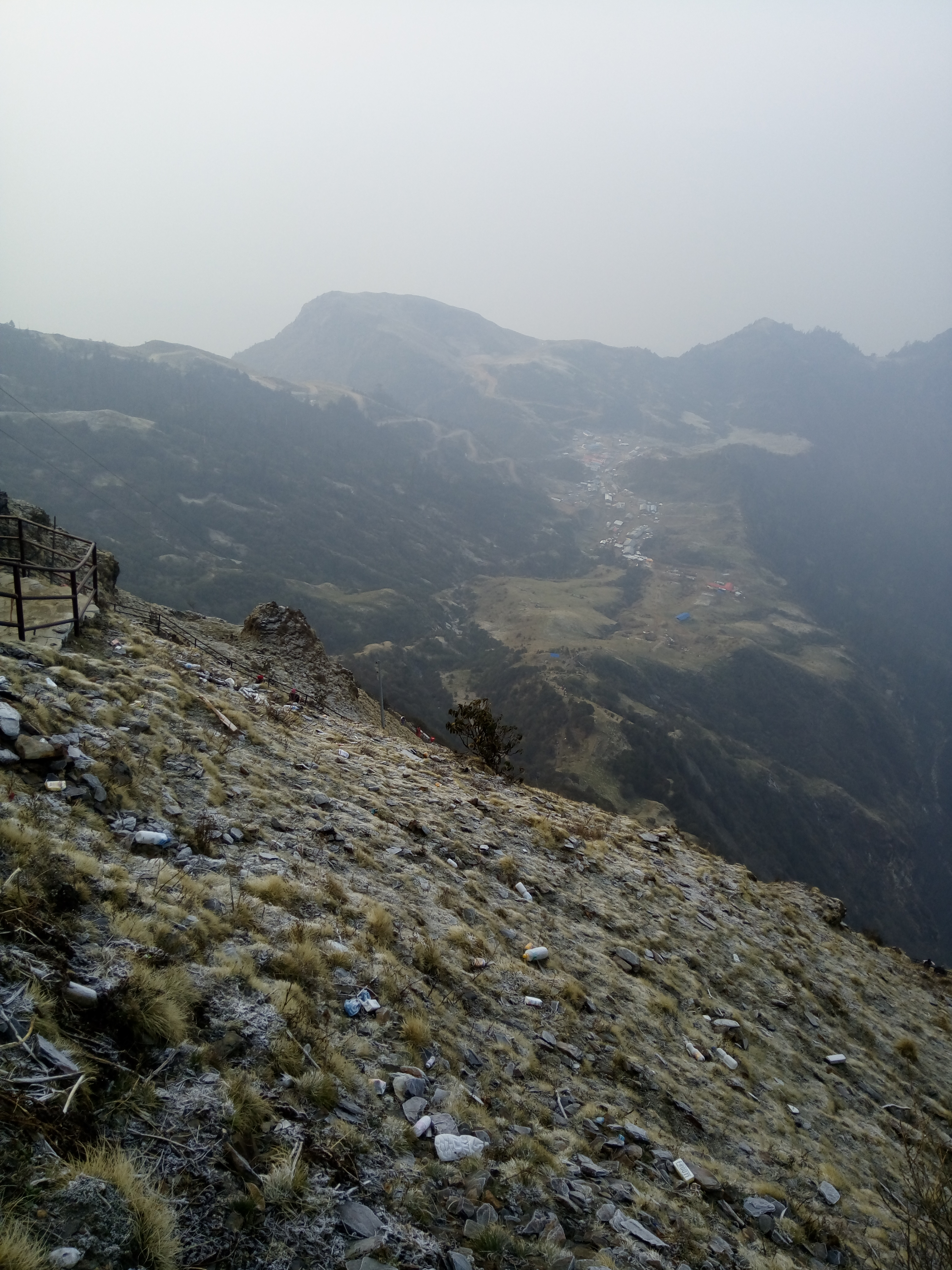
Kalinchowk

Jiri

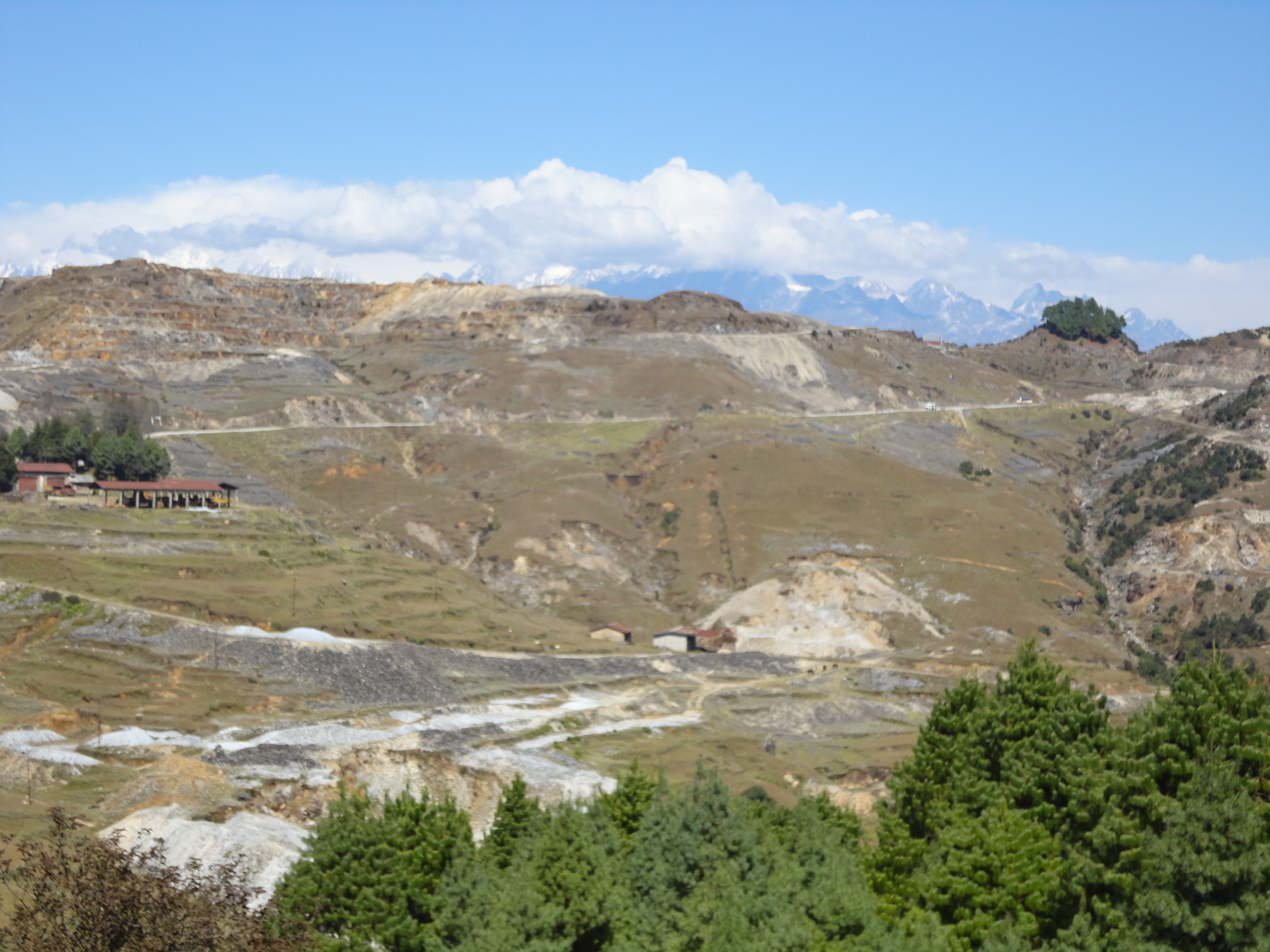
Khari dhunga Dolakha Nepal

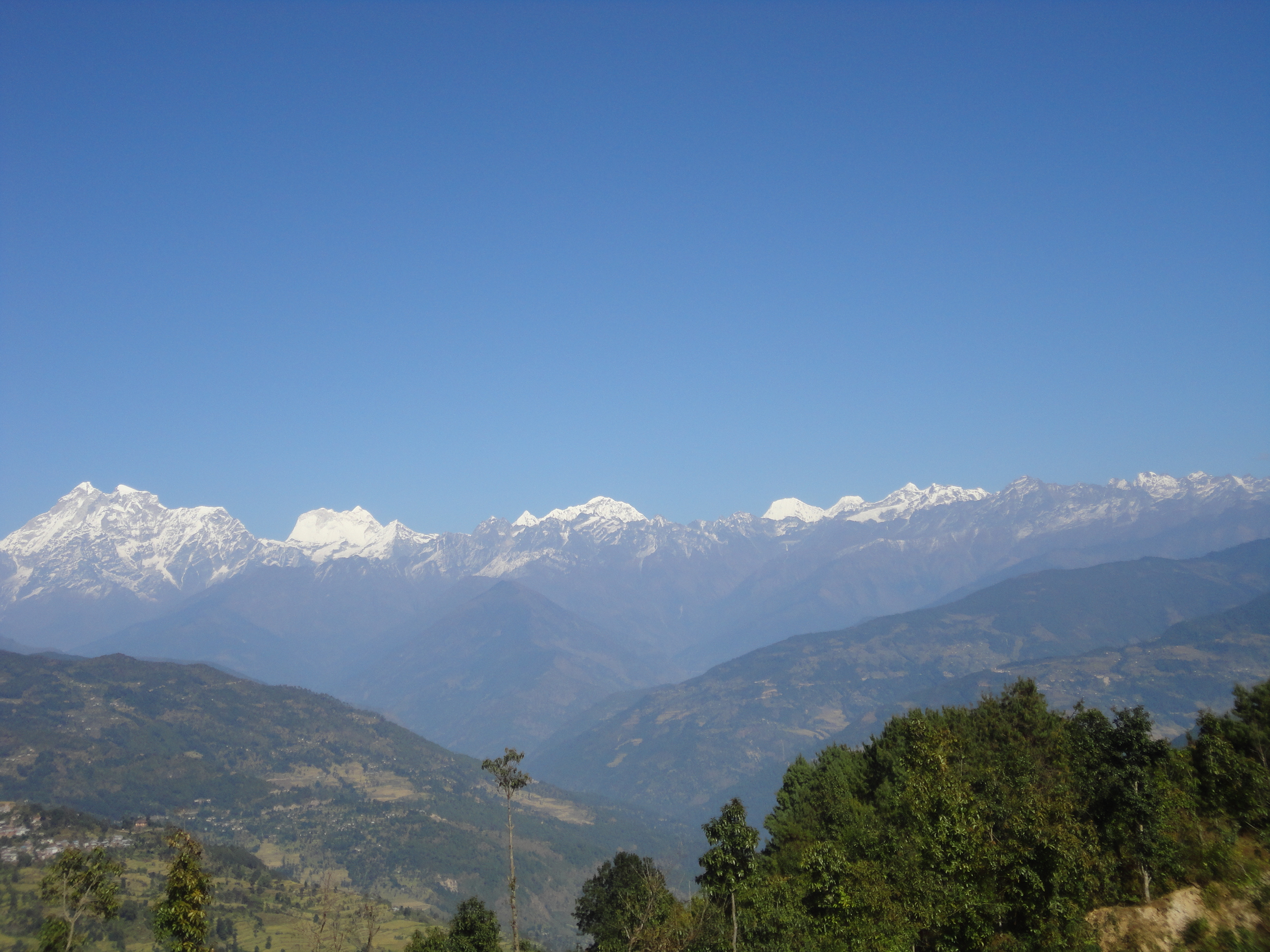
Himalayan range GAURISHANKAR

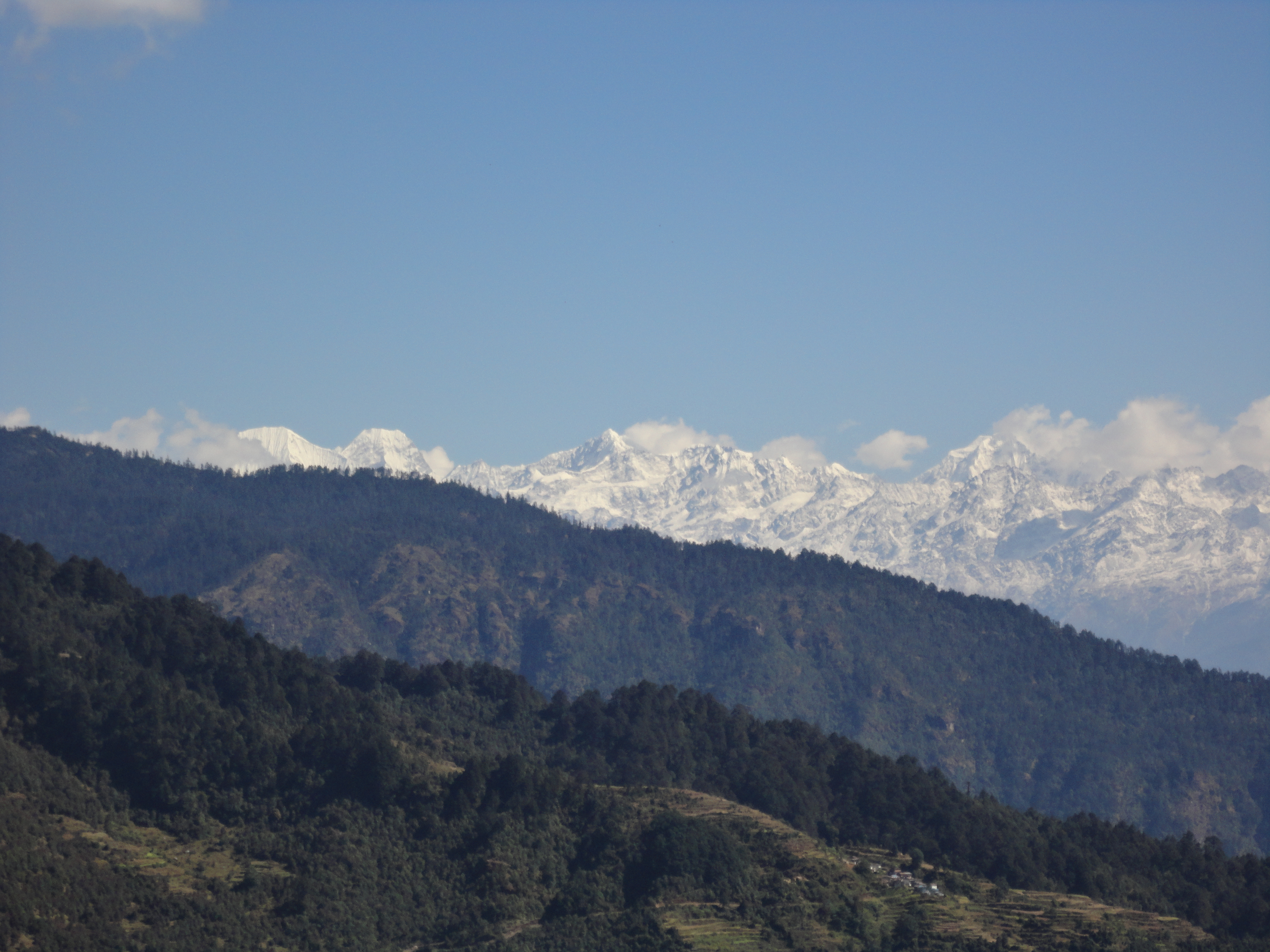
View

== See also ==
- Zones of Nepal
- Dolakha Newar Language
- Thangmi language
- Informative page about Dolakha
