= Orang, Nepal =

Orang, Nepal ओराङ
- Village development committee
- Location in Nepal
- Coordinates: 27.81°N 86.20°E
- Country: Nepal
- Zone: Janakpur Zone
- District: Dolakha District

Population (1991)
  - Total: 1,771
- Time zone: UTC+5:45 (Nepal Time)

Orang, Nepal is a village development committee in Dolakha District in the Janakpur Zone of north-eastern Nepal. At the time of the 1991 Nepal census it had a population of 1,771 people living in 378 individual households.

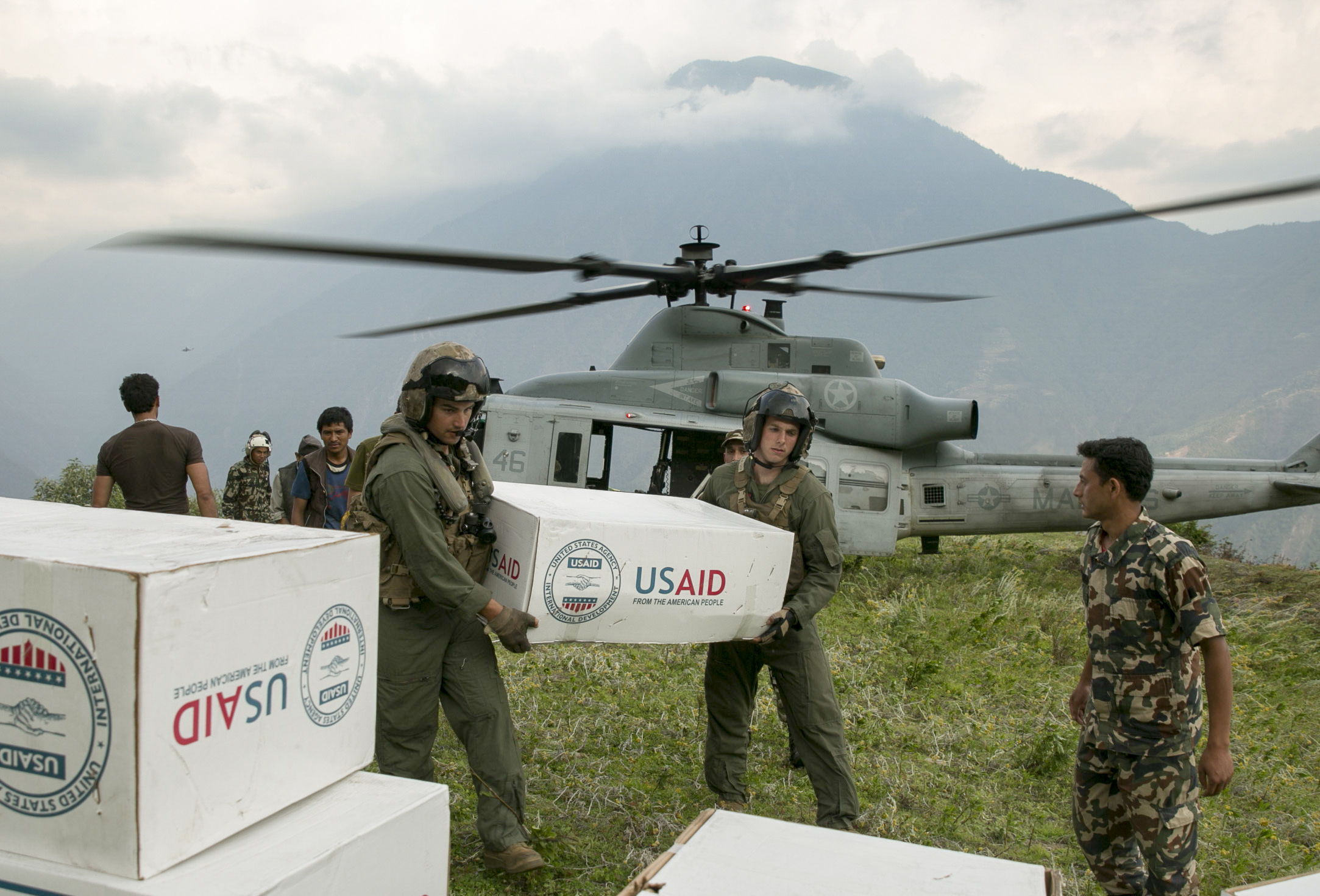
Relief efforts in Orang after the May 2015 Nepal earthquake (Operation Sahayogi Haat)
