= Mati, Nepal =

Coordinates: 27°39′N 86°03′E

Mati, Nepal माटी
- Village development committee
- Interactive map of Mati, Nepal
- Country: Nepal
- Zone: Janakpur Zone
- District: Dolakha District

Population (1991)
  - Total: 4,264
- Time zone: UTC+5:45 (Nepal Time)

Mati, Nepal is a village in Bhimeshwor municipality, Dolakha District in the Janakpur Zone of north-eastern Nepal. At the time of the 1991 Nepal census it had a population of 4,264 people living in 886 individual households. Currently Basu Shrestha is the ward chief of this village.
