= Bhusapheda =

Coordinates: 27°39′N 85°56′E

Bhusapheda भुसाफेदा
- Village development committee
- Interactive map of Bhusapheda
- Country: Nepal
- Zone: Janakpur Zone
- District: Dolakha District

Population (1991)
  - Total: 2,024
- Time zone: UTC+5:45 (Nepal Time)

Bhusapheda is a village development committee in Dolakha District in the Janakpur Zone of north-eastern Nepal. At the time of the 1991 Nepal census it had a population of 2,024 people living in 450 individual households.
