= Phasku =

Phasku फस्कु
- Village development committee
- Location in Nepal
- Coordinates: 27.62°N 86.04°E
- Country: Nepal
- Zone: Janakpur Zone
- District: Dolakha District

Population (1991)
  - Total: 4,580
- Time zone: UTC+5:45 (Nepal Time)

Phasku is a village development committee in Dolakha District in the Janakpur Zone of north-eastern Nepal. At the time of the 1991 Nepal census it had a population of 4,580 people living in 953 individual households.
