= Malu, Nepal =

Malu, Nepal मालु
- Location in Nepal
- Coordinates: 27.52°N 86.10°E
- Country: Nepal
- Province: Bagmati Province
- District: Dolakha District

Population (1991)
  - Total: 2,439
- Time zone: UTC+5:45 (Nepal Time)

Malu, Nepal is a 4th ward of Tamakoshi Rural Municipalities in Dolakha District in the Bagmati Province of north-eastern Nepal. At the time of the 1991 Nepal census it had a population of 2,439 people living in 497 individual households.
