= Dudhpokhari, Dolakha =

Dudhpokhari दूधपोखरी
- Village development committee
- Interactive map of Dudhpokhari
- Coordinates: 27.6024°N 85.9381°E
- Country: Nepal
- Zone: Janakpur Zone
- District: Dolakha District

Population (1991)
  - Total: 2,572
- Time zone: UTC+5:45 (Nepal Time)

Dudhpokhari is a village development committee in Dolakha District in the Janakpur Zone of north-eastern Nepal. At the time of the 1991 Nepal census it had a population of 2,572 people living in 473 individual households.
