= Kabhre, Dolakha =

Kabre काब्रे
- Village development committee
- Location in Nepal
- Coordinates: 27.64°N 86.15°E
- Country: Nepal
- Zone: Janakpur Zone
- District: Dolakha District

Population (1991)
  - Total: 4,235
- Time zone: UTC+5:45 (Nepal Time)

Kabre, Janakpur is a village development committee in Dolakha District in the Janakpur Zone of north-eastern Nepal. At the time of the 1991 Nepal census it had a population of 4,235 people living in 894 individual households.
