= Mirge =

Mirge मिर्गे
- Village development committee
- Location in Nepal
- Coordinates: 27.62°N 86.15°E
- Country: Nepal
- Zone: Janakpur Zone
- District: Dolakha District

Population (1991)
  - Total: 3,216
- Time zone: UTC+5:45 (Nepal Time)

Mirge is a village development committee in Dolakha District in the Janakpur Zone of north-eastern Nepal. At the time of the 1991 Nepal census it had a population of 3,216 people living in 693 individual households. Now it is ward no 3 of Baiteshwar rural municipality.
