= Jhule =

Jhule झुले
- Village development committee
- Location in Nepal
- Coordinates: 27.56°N 86.12°E
- Country: Nepal
- Zone: Janakpur Zone
- District: Dolakha District

Population (1991)
  - Total: 2,491
- Time zone: UTC+5:45 (Nepal Time)

Jhule is a village development committee in Dolakha District in the Janakpur Zone of north-eastern Nepal. At the time of the 1991 Nepal census it had a population of 2,491 people living in 489 individual households.
