= Jirel language =

Tibetic language

Jirel
- जिरीबे केचा, Iriwe Kecha, སྤྱི་རི་བེ ཀེ་ཅ་, ziribe Ketsha
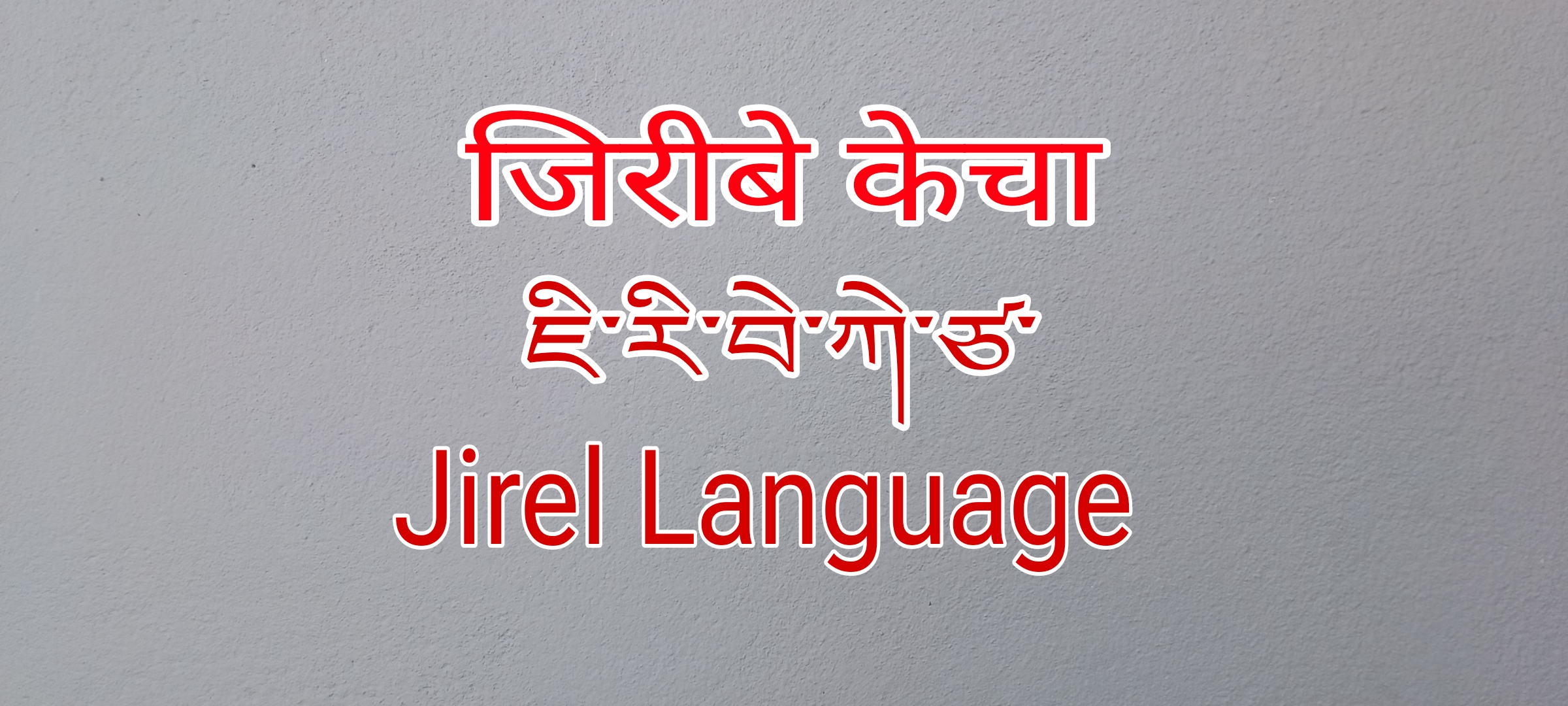
- 'Jirel' in Devanagari and Tibetan scripts
- Native to: Nepal, India
- Region: Nepal, Sikkim
- Ethnicity: Jirel
- Native speakers: 140,000 (2011 & 2021 census)
- Language family: Sino-Tibetan: Tibeto-Burman; Tibeto-Kanauri (?); Bodish; Tibetic; Southern Tibetic; Jirel
- Writing system: Tibetan, Devanagari

Official status
- Official language in: Nepal; India: Sikkim

Language codes
- ISO 639-3: jul
- Glottolog: jire1238
- ELP: Jirel
- Linguasphere: 70-AAA-ba

Jirel is a Southern Tibetic language of Nepal. It is spoken in Jiri, in Tshetrapa village, Jungu village, and Cheppu village of Dolakha District and Sindhupalchok and different parts of Nepal.

== Phonology ==
=== Consonants ===
			Bilabial	Alveolar		Palatal	Velar	Glottal
			Bilabial	plain	sibilant		Velar	Glottal
Nasal			m	n		ɲ	ŋ	
Plosive/ Affricate	voiceless	plain	p	t	t͡s	t͡ʃ	k	
Plosive/ Affricate	voiceless	prenasalized	ᵐp	ⁿt	ⁿt͡s	ⁿt͡ʃ	ᵑk	
Plosive/ Affricate	voiced	plain	b	d	d͡z	d͡ʒ	ɡ	
Plosive/ Affricate	voiced	prenasalized	ᵐb	ⁿd	ⁿd͡z	ⁿd͡ʒ	ᵑɡ	
Fricative	voiceless				s	ʃ		h
Fricative	voiced				z	ʒ		
Tap				ɾ				
Lateral				l				
Approximant			w			j		

=== Vowels ===
	Front	Central	Back
Close	i		u
Mid	e		o
Open		ä	

== Writing system ==
Jirel Uchen, which is also called Sambhota Script, is their script or calligraphy. This can be found at religious monuments like Ngasas (Chautara), chortens, and monasteries. Jirel Lamas use this script. The script is shown below:

ཀ ka [ká]	ཁ kha [kʰá]	ག ga [ɡà/kʰːà]	ང nga [ŋà]
ཅ ca [tɕá]	ཆ cha [tɕʰá]	ཇ ja [dʑà/tɕʰːà]	ཉ nya [ɲà]
ཏ ta [tá]	ཐ tha [tʰá]	ད da [dà/tʰːà]	ན na [nà]
པ pa [pá]	ཕ pha [pʰá]	བ ba [bà/pʰːà]	མ ma [mà]
ཙ tsa [tsá]	ཚ tsha [tsʰá]	ཛ dza [dzà/tsʰːà]	ཝ wa [wà]
ཞ zha [ʑà]	ཟ za [zà]	འ 'a [ʔà]	ཡ ya [jà]
ར ra [rà]	ལ la [là]	ཤ sha [ɕá]	ས sa [sá]
ཧ ha [há]	ཨ a [ʔá]		

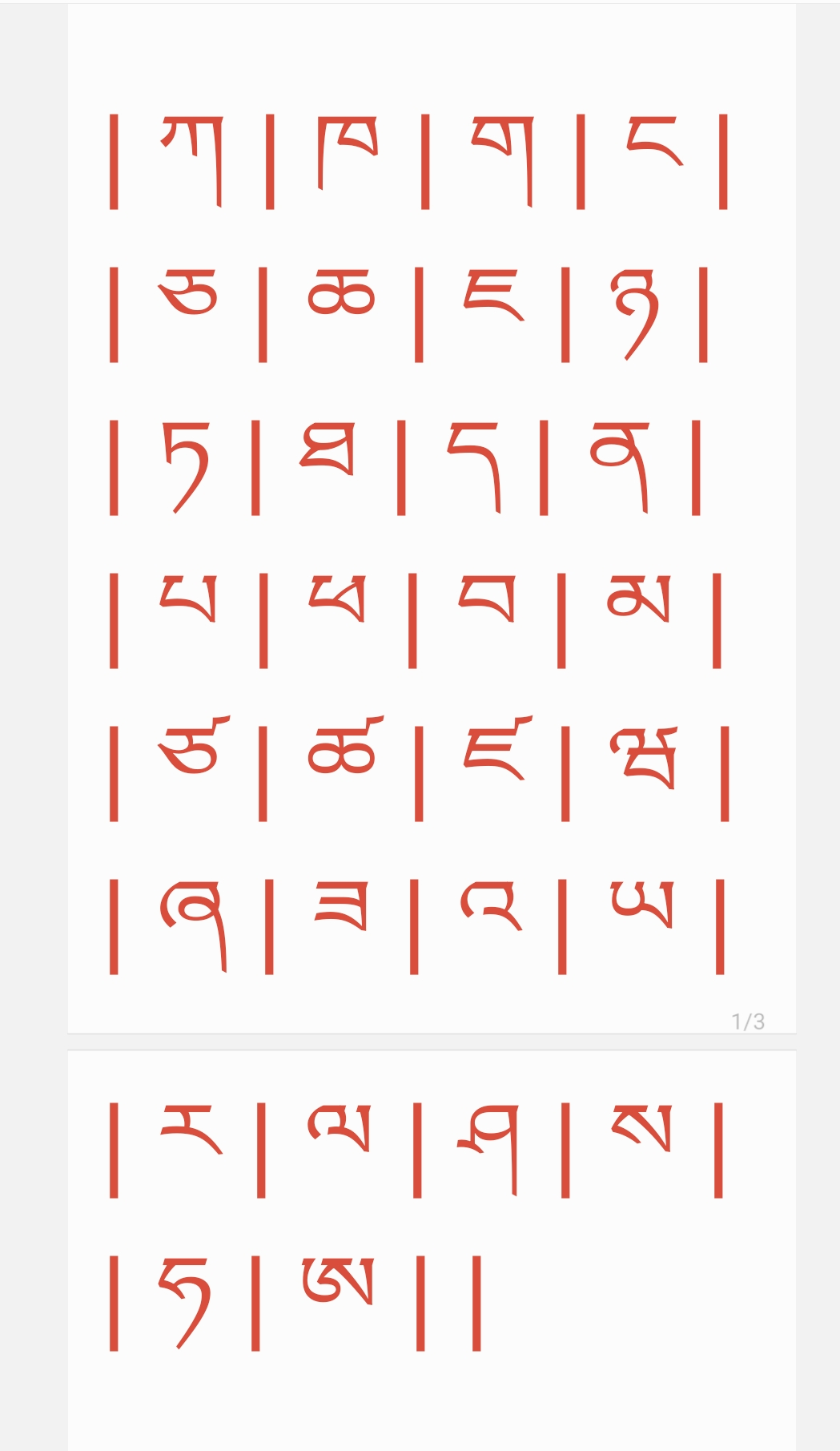
Jiriba Uchen

The similarity of Jirel language that with the language used in Buddhist holy books is another powerful evidence to claim and believe that they are of Tibetan origin. It is believed that more than 80 percent of Jirel diction goes with Tibetan language where only 35–40 percent of diction is found to be close to other Tibetan origin tribes.Their language is similar to Dolpos, people in Mugu, Hyalmus, Sherpas, Syubas, Lhomis.
