= Bhirkot, Dolakha =

Bhirkot, Dolakha भीर्कोट
- Village development committee
- Location in Nepal
- Coordinates: 27.59°N 86.10°E
- Country: Nepal
- Zone: Janakpur Zone
- District: Dolakha District

Population (1991)
  - Total: 2,208
- Time zone: UTC+5:45 (Nepal Time)

Bhirkot is a village development committee in Dolakha District in the Janakpur Zone of north-eastern Nepal. At the time of the 1991 Nepal census it had a population of 2,208 people living in 470 individual households.
