= Shailungeshwar =

Shailungeshwar शैलुङ्गेश्वर
- Village development committee
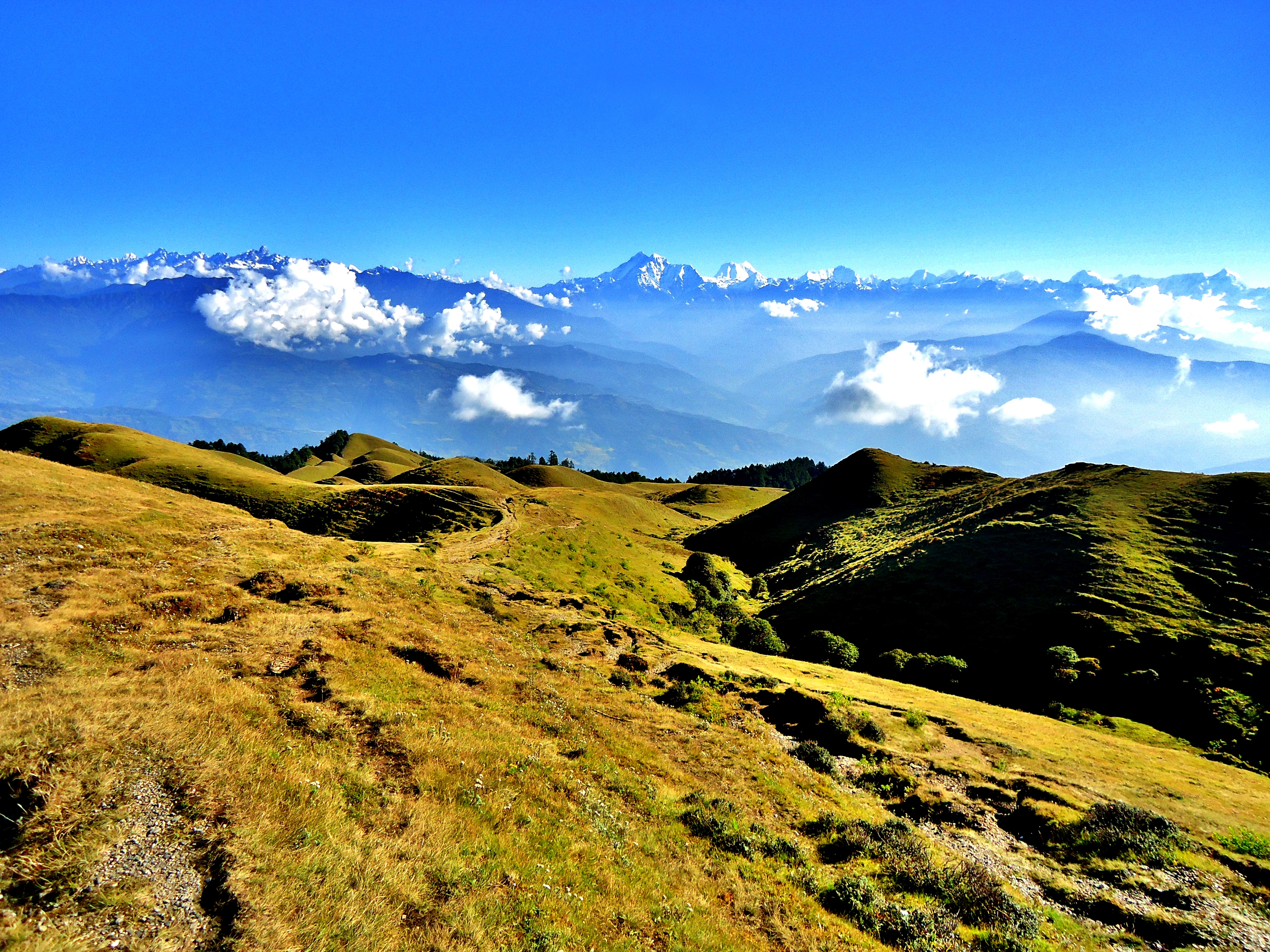

- Location in Nepal
- Coordinates: 27.58°N 86.02°E
- Country: Nepal
- Zone: Janakpur Zone
- District: Dolakha District

Population (1991)
  - Total: 3,632
- Time zone: UTC+5:45 (Nepal Time)

Shailungeshwar is a village development committee in Dolakha District in the Janakpur Zone of north-eastern Nepal. At the time of the 1991 Nepal census it had a population of 3,637 people living in 736 individual households.
