= Magapauwa =

Magapauwa मागपौवा
- Village development committee
- Location in Nepal
- Coordinates: 27.66°N 85.99°E
- Country: Nepal
- Zone: Janakpur Zone
- District: Dolakha District

Population (1991)
  - Total: 3,099
- Time zone: UTC+5:45 (Nepal Time)

Magapauwa is a Ward of Shailung Rural Municipality in Dolakha District in the Janakpur Zone of north-eastern Nepal. At the time of the 1991 Nepal census it had a population of 3,099 people living in 638 individual households.
