= Hawa, Nepal =

Hawa हवा
- Village development committee
- Location in Nepal
- Coordinates: 27.57°N 86.16°E
- Country: Nepal
- Zone: Janakpur Zone
- District: Dolakha District

Population (1991)
  - Total: 1,833
- Time zone: UTC+5:45 (Nepal Time)

Hawa is a village development committee in Dolakha District in the Janakpur Zone of north-eastern Nepal. At the time of the 1991 Nepal census it had a population of 1,833 people living in 372 individual households.
