= Namdu =

Namdu नाम्दु
- Village development committee
- Nickname: It was also called Nam Bindu. Nam Bindu means lack of water. There was lack of water in the area in history. Sherpa people used to say Namdu instead of Nam Bindu.
- Location in Nepal
- Coordinates: 27.64°N 86.11°E
- Country: Nepal
- Zone: Janakpur Zone
- District: Dolakha District

Population (2011)
  - Total: 250,000
- Time zone: UTC+5:45 (Nepal Time)

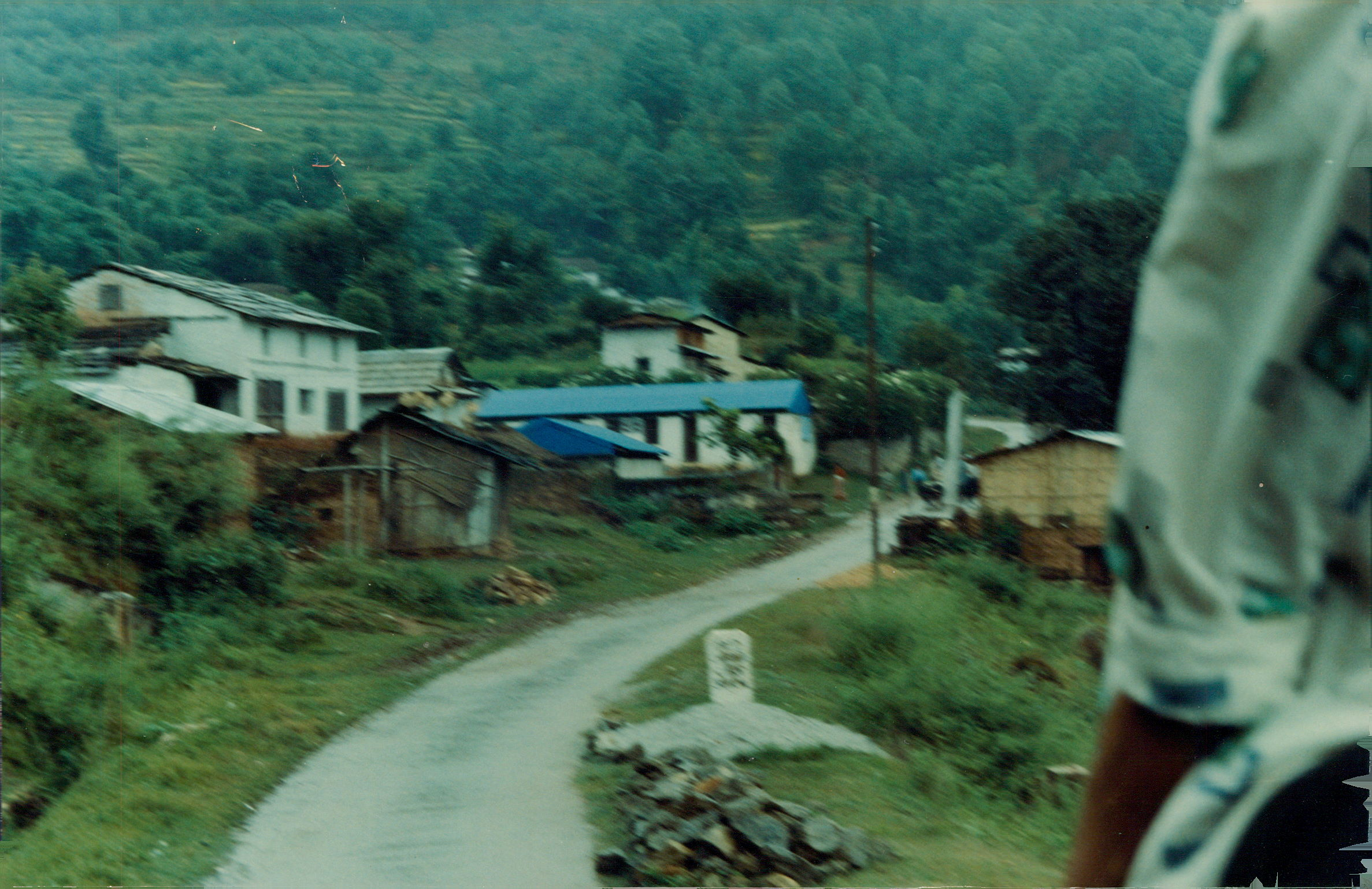
This is an Old Photo of Namdu Village

Namdu is a village development committee in Dolakha District in the Janakpur Zone of north-eastern Nepal. At the time of the 1991 Nepal census it had a population of 4,938 people living in 1,062 individual households.
