= Jirel people =

Indigenous people of Nepal

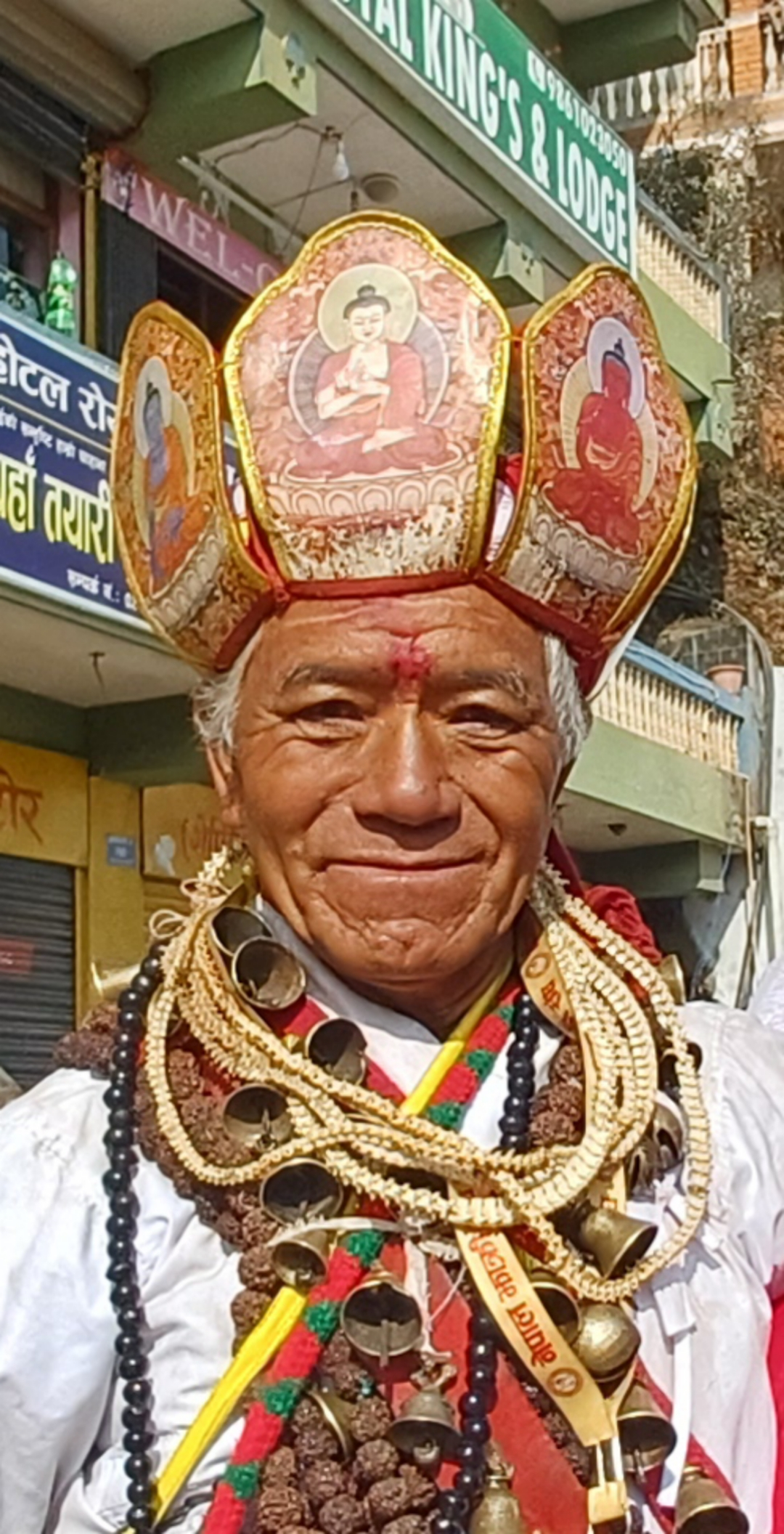
- Phon Jirel priest

Regions with significant populations
- Nepal; India; Bhutan; China (Tibet Autonomous Region)

Languages
- Jirel language

Religion
- Hinduism, Buddhism and minorities of Bön, Christianity, Animism, Jainism, Kiratism, Muslim

The Jirel (Nepali: जिरेल जाति) are one of the 59 indigenous peoples in Nepal. They call themselves Jiriba, which means "people from the mountain of life."

The Jirel were under the Kirat dynasty but eventually departed from them. Some Jirel routinely traveled to Tibet for work in ancient times, eventually leading to them adopting Buddhist culture. The name of the mountain Gaurishankar in Jiriba or Jirel is "Tsheri/ziri". In Jirel language "Zi/Tshe" means life or light and "Ri" means mountain. Jiriba means "the People from the life mountain". They are the original inhabitants of vast Jiri and its adjoining villages in Dolkha district, the central region of Nepal. They have their own distinct language, culture, customs, rituals and lifestyles. They historically practiced phonbo or "bonpo". They are now mostly Buddhist but many of the Jirel adhere to other religions, like Christianity, Islam and Hinduism.

They were historically practitioners of Phon or "Bon" which also known in Tibetan as "Bonpo". Their indigenous shamanistic religious beliefs are centered on practitioners called Phonbo, "Shamans" who are believed to have a direct relationship with the supernatural world. Their main occupation is agriculture and animal husbandry. In recent years they have also been involved in business, government, and teaching jobs. Many of the Jirel are in the British Gurkha Army, Indian Army, Nepalese Army, and the police. They are primarily settled in Dolakha, Sindhupalchowk Chitwan, and Ilam districts, next to Likhu, Khimti, the Jiri and Jiri Shikri rivers. Jirels have linguistic and ethnic semblance mostly with the tribes of Central Tibet (Lhasa), also with Sherpas, Dolpos, Hyalmus, Syubas, Lhomis, Bhotes in Nepal. Jirels have their own mother tongue which is called Jirpa Kecha, and belongs to the Tibetan language family.
