= Thami =

Indigenous tribe of Nepal

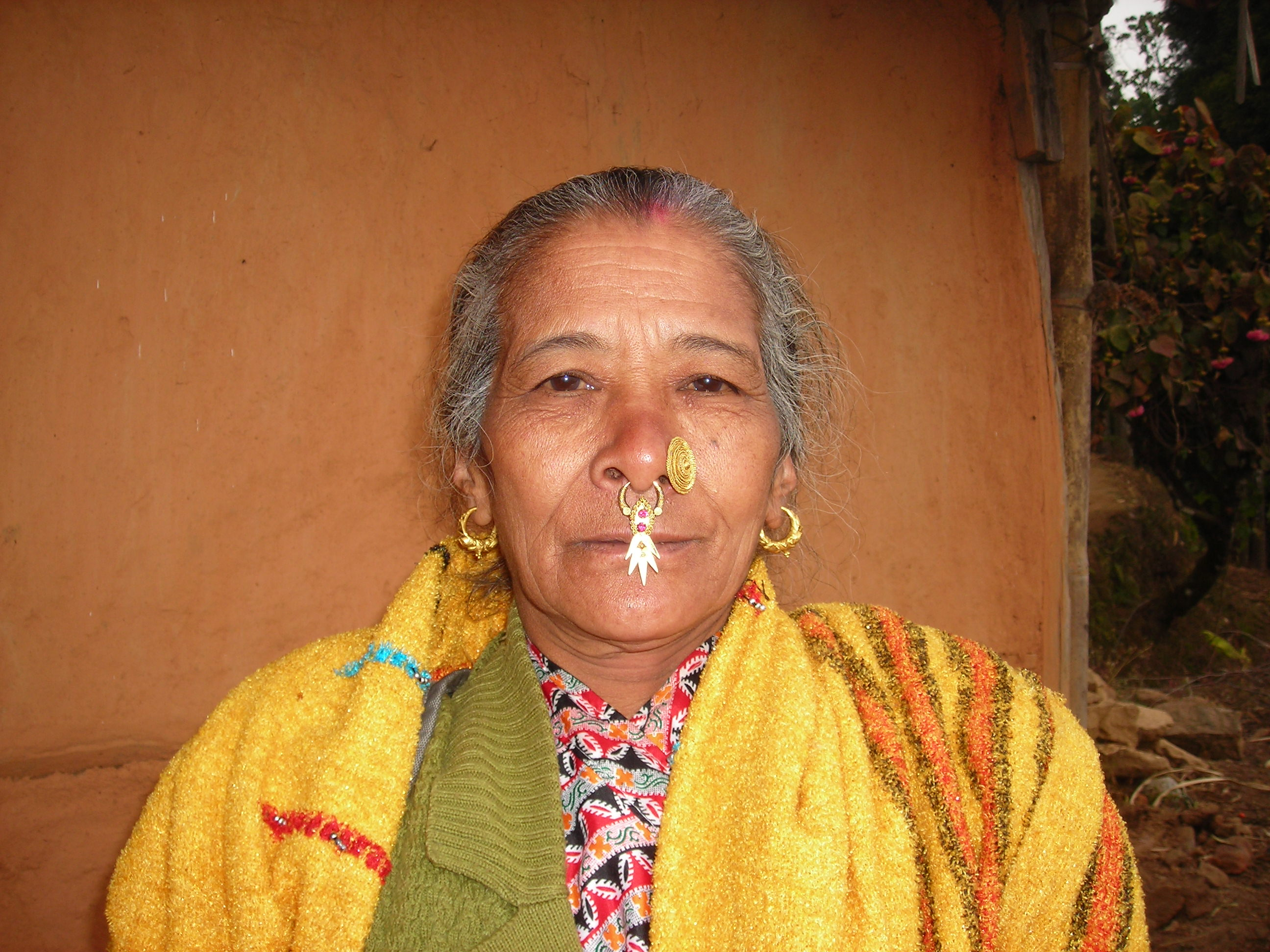
A Thami woman in Ilam District wearing Jhamke Bulaki, a typical Nepali ornament on her nose

The Thami or Thangmi (in Nepali थामी) are an indigenous ethnic tribe of Eastern Himalayas. In Nepal, they reside mainly in Suspa, Kshamawati, Khopachagu, Alampu, Bigu, Kalinchok, Lapilang and Lakuri Danda villages of Dolakha district in East-Central Nepal. In India, they reside in Darjeeling, Kalimpong, Kerseong (West Bengal) and Sikkim (Shniderman, 2009, 2015). Many members of Thami clan are also living in Bhutan. They are locally known as Thangmi.

They speak the Thami language or Thangmi Wakhekham, which is a Tibeto-Burman language. The etymological meaning of the word 'Thami' consists of 'Tha' (border region) and 'Mi' (people). Therefore, the word Thami indicates to the people residing in the frontier territory of Nepal (Sheniderman, 2009, 2015; Turin, 1998, 2004)

According to the 2011 Nepal Census, there are a total of 29,000 Thami of which some belong to the Kirat religion, and some belong to Hinduism and Buddhism. Thami ethnic tribe are nature worshipper and follows shamans in their religious-spiritual activities. They have their deities to whom they worship during Udhauli and Ubhauli Pudusa. They worship 'Bara-Dewa' (the twelve deities), 'Bhumya Dewa' (Mother Earth), 'Bisai Dewa', 'Gosai Dewa', 'Chirkun Dewa' and many others. However, with due course of time Thami indigenous tribe were highly influenced by the popular religion and as a consequence they tend to identify themselves mainly as Hindu and Buddhist. The process of acculturation has threatened their indigenous culture, tradition and belief system.

Thangmi are socio-economically and politically backward classes. One of the important causes is the exclusion of Thamis from autochthones tribe of Eastern Himalayas and lack of written documents to support the claim that they are aboriginals. Often, they are misrecognized and misrepresented as the sub-clan or caste of other communities and they are not even mentioned in 'Muluk Ain Code' National Code of Nepal in 1854 (See, Muluk Ain of 1854). They have always remained at the margin, and this forced them to depend on agriculture, hunting, carpentry, manual and unskilled works. This made them economically weak, and poverty became one of the important causes for not obtaining standard of living. Poverty is another reason that excluded them for obtaining basic education.

== Geographical distribution ==
At present, the population of Thami in both India and Nepal are less as compared to all other Nepalese communities. The 2011 Nepal census classifies the Thami within the broader social group of Mountain/Hill Janajati. At the time of the Nepal census of 2011, 28,671 people (0.1% of the population of Nepal) were Thami. The frequency of Thami by province was as follows:

- Bagmati Province (0.5%)
- Gandaki Province (0.0%)
- Karnali Province (0.0%)
- Koshi Province (0.0%)
- Lumbini Province (0.0%)
- Madhesh Province (0.0%)
- Sudurpashchim Province (0.0%)

The frequency of Thami was higher than national average (0.1%) in the following districts:

- Dolakha (9.0%)
- Sindhupalchowk (1.7%)
- Ramechhap (1.0%)
- Ilam (0.3%)
- Sindhuli (0.3%)
