= Melung Rural Municipality =

Melung (RM) मेलुङ्ग गाउँपालिका Melung Gaunpalika
- Rural Municipality
- Location Melung (RM) (Nepal)
- Coordinates: 27.51°N 86.07°E
- Country: Nepal
- Province: Bagmati
- District: Dolakha
- Wards: 7
- Established: 10 March 2017

Government
  - Type: Rural Council
  - Chairperson: Mr. Hira Kumar Tamang (Cpn Uml)
  - Vice-chairperson: Mrs. Gayatri Acharya (Cpn Uml)

Area
  - Total: 86.54 km^{2} (33.41 sq mi)

Population (2011)
  - Total: 20,210
  - Density: 233.5/km^{2} (604.8/sq mi)
- Time zone: UTC+5:45 (Nepal Standard Time)
- Headquarter: Bhedapu
- Website: melungmun.gov.np

Melung is a Rural municipality located within the Dolakha District of the Bagmati Province of Nepal. The municipality spans 86.54 square kilometres (33.41 sq mi) of area, with a total population of 20,708 according to a 2011 Nepal census.

On March 10, 2017, the Government of Nepal restructured the local level bodies into 753 new local level structures. The previous Pawati, Ghang Sukathokar, Bhedapu, Dandakharka, and Melung VDCs were merged to form Melung Rural Municipality. Melung is divided into 7 wards, with Bhedapu declared the administrative center of the rural municipality.

== Demographics ==
At the time of the 2011 Nepal census, Melung Rural Municipality had a population of 20,287. Of these, 78.7% spoke Nepali, 18.8% Tamang, 1.1% Thangmi, 0.8% Magar, 0.3% Newar, and 0.2% other languages as their first language.

In terms of ethnicity/caste, 42.9% were Chhetri, 19.0% Tamang, 8.7% Newar, 7.8% Hill Brahmin, 5.3% Magar, 5.0% Kami, 2.5% Sarki, 2.4% Damai/Dholi, 2.3% Gharti/Bhujel, 2.0% Sanyasi/Dasnami, 1.5% Thami, and 0.4% others.

In terms of religion, 73.7% were Hindu, 23.6% Buddhist, 1.5% Prakriti, 0.8% Christian, and 0.3% others.

In terms of literacy, 59.8% could read and write, 4.9% could only read, and 35.3% could neither read nor write.

== Melung VDC ==
Melung (the previous VDC) is now a part of Melung Rural Municipality. It was a separate village development committee (VDC) from 1990 to 2017. Melung village had more than 6 square kilometres (2.3 sq mi) of area, and the population according to 2011 had 3,566 with 836 individual households. This whole village is now a ward (ward no. 7) of Melung RM. Some areas from Melung VDC were carved out and merged with Dandakharka to form ward no. 6 of Melung RM.

== Ward division ==
Melung RM is divided into 7 wards as below:

Melung RM
Village	Ward	Area (KM^{2})	Population (2011)
Pawati	1	16.96	4,573
Ghang Sukathokar	2	6.19	1,891
Ghang Sukathokar	3	14.3	2,339
Bhedapu	4	18.39	3705
Dandakharka	5	14.21	2,816
Dandakharka	6	10.27	2,637
Melung	7	6.22	2,249
Melung RM	7	86.54	20,210

== Climate ==
Climate data for Melung, elevation 1,536 m (5,039 ft)
Month	Jan	Feb	Mar	Apr	May	Jun	Jul	Aug	Sep	Oct	Nov	Dec	Year
Mean daily maximum °C (°F)	15.5 (59.9)	17.7 (63.9)	21.8 (71.2)	25.4 (77.7)	25.8 (78.4)	26.0 (78.8)	25.1 (77.2)	25.2 (77.4)	24.4 (75.9)	23.6 (74.5)	20.2 (68.4)	16.8 (62.2)	22.3 (72.1)
Mean daily minimum °C (°F)	3.4 (38.1)	4.7 (40.5)	8.4 (47.1)	12.5 (54.5)	14.9 (58.8)	17.3 (63.1)	17.9 (64.2)	17.5 (63.5)	16.4 (61.5)	13.2 (55.8)	7.6 (45.7)	4.1 (39.4)	11.5 (52.7)
Average precipitation mm (inches)	12.9 (0.51)	14.8 (0.58)	27.7 (1.09)	68.5 (2.70)	122.0 (4.80)	248.5 (9.78)	343.1 (13.51)	338.3 (13.32)	168.7 (6.64)	47.9 (1.89)	7.4 (0.29)	8.7 (0.34)	1,408.5 (55.45)
Source 1: Australian National University
Source 2: Japan International Cooperation Agency (precipitation)
