= Djalecti =

- Coordinates: 7.57°N 12.27°E
- Country: Cameroon
- Region: Adamawa
- Department: Faro-et-Déo

Population (2005)
  - Total: 222

Djalecti (also Djalekti or Zalecti in the local language) is a village in Almé locality in the commune of Mayo-Baléo, in the Adamawa Region of Cameroon, near the border with Nigeria and Park of Polie in the North Region. The village, as indicated in the map is too small with 222 inhabitants in 2017. Like all other African villages, all the villagers are mostly from one clan. The main activity is traditional agriculture.

== Population ==
In 1971, Djalecti contained 120 inhabitants, mainly Kutin people

In the 2005 census, 222 people were counted there.

== Bibliography ==
- Jean Boutrais (ed.), Peuples et cultures de l'Adamaoua (Cameroun) : Actes du colloque de Ngaoundéré, du 14 au 16 janvier 1992, ORSTOM, Paris; Ngaoundéré-Anthropos, 1993, 316 p. ISBN 2-7099-1167-1
- Dictionnaire des villages de l'Adamaoua, ONAREST, Yaoundé, October 1974, 133 p.
