= Pawati =

Pawati may refer to:

- Pawati, Cameroon
- Pawati, Nepal
