= Alme, Cameroon =

Alme
- Coordinates: 7.4978167°N 12.4833°E
- Country: Cameroon
- Region: Adamawa
- Department: Faro-et-Déo
- Elevation: 764 m (2,507 ft)

Population (2005)
  - Total: 1,813

Alme (or Almé) is a village in the commune of Mayo-Baléoin Adamawa Region, Cameroon, near the border with Nigeria.

== Population ==
In 1971 Alme contained 300 inhabitants, mostly Kutin.

In the 2005 census, 1813 people were counted in the village of Alme and 4651 in the canton of the same name

== Bibliography ==
- Jean Boutrais (ed.), Peuples et cultures de l'Adamaoua (Cameroun) : Actes du colloque de Ngaoundéré, du 14 au 16 janvier 1992, ORSTOM, Paris; Ngaoundéré-Anthropos, 1993, 316 p. ISBN 2-7099-1167-1
- Dictionnaire des villages de l'Adamaoua, ONAREST, Yaoundé, octobre 1974, 133 p.
