= Alme =

Alme may refer to:

- Alme (river), a tributary of the Lippe in Germany
- Almè, a municipality in the province of Bergamo, Italy
- Alme, Cameroon, a village in Adamawa Region
- Almé Z, a sire of show jumping horses
- Almeh, a type of female entertainers in Egypt
- Alme (surname)
