= Dandakharka =

Dandakharka may refer to:

- Dandakharka, Janakpur, Nepal
- Dandakharka, Narayani, Nepal
