= Yayi =

Yayi may refer to

- China-Taiwan Yayi Cup, a Go competition
- Thomas Boni Yayi (born 1951), Beninese banker and politician
- Tongo Sarki Yayï, a village in Cameroon
