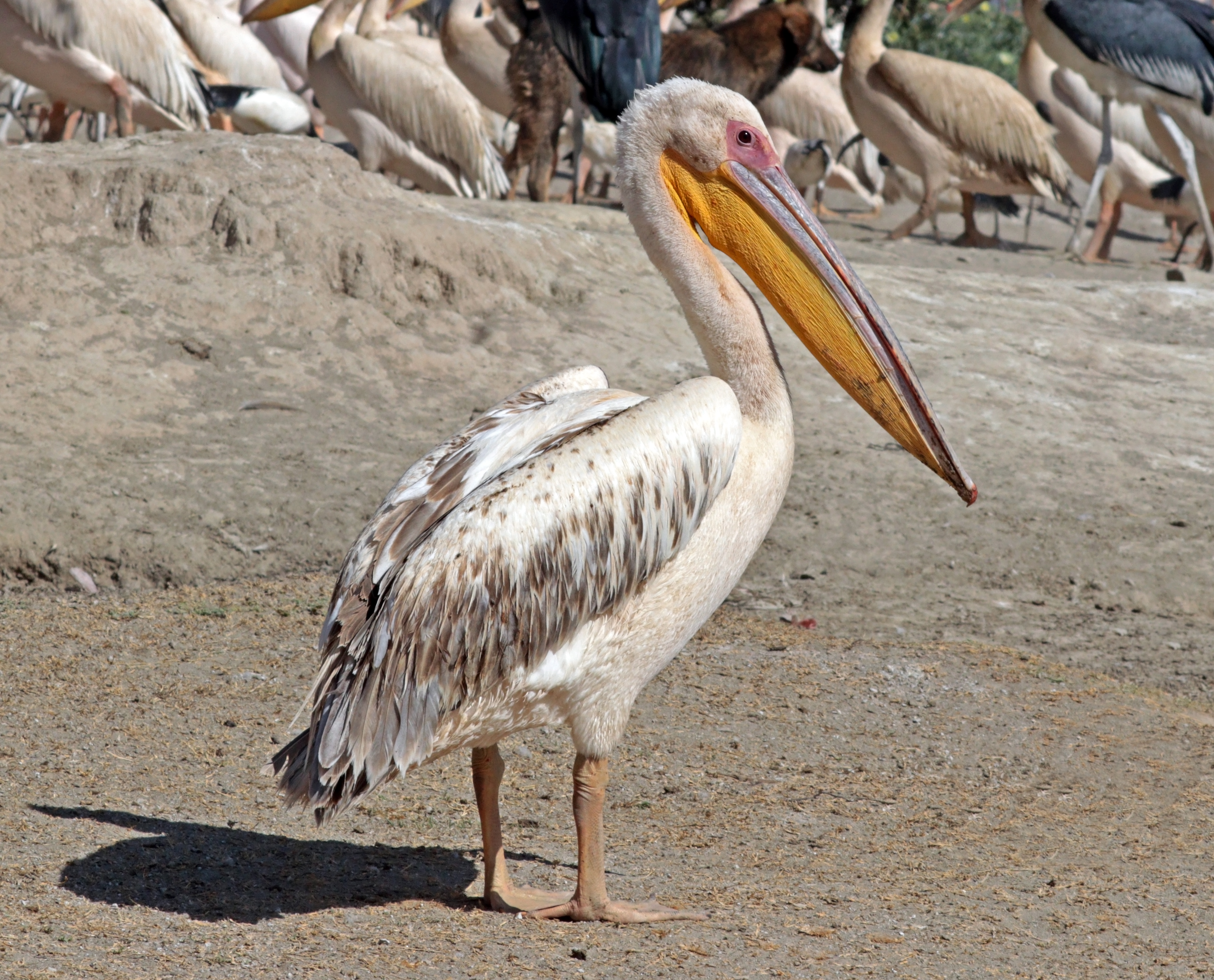
- In Lake Ziway, Ethiopia: Great White Pelican calls while feeding in Tulcea, Romania

Conservation status
- Least Concern (IUCN 3.1)

Scientific classification
- Kingdom: Animalia
- Phylum: Chordata
- Class: Aves
- Order: Pelecaniformes
- Family: Pelecanidae
- Genus: Pelecanus
- Species: P. onocrotalus

Binomial name
- Pelecanus onocrotalus Linnaeus, 1758
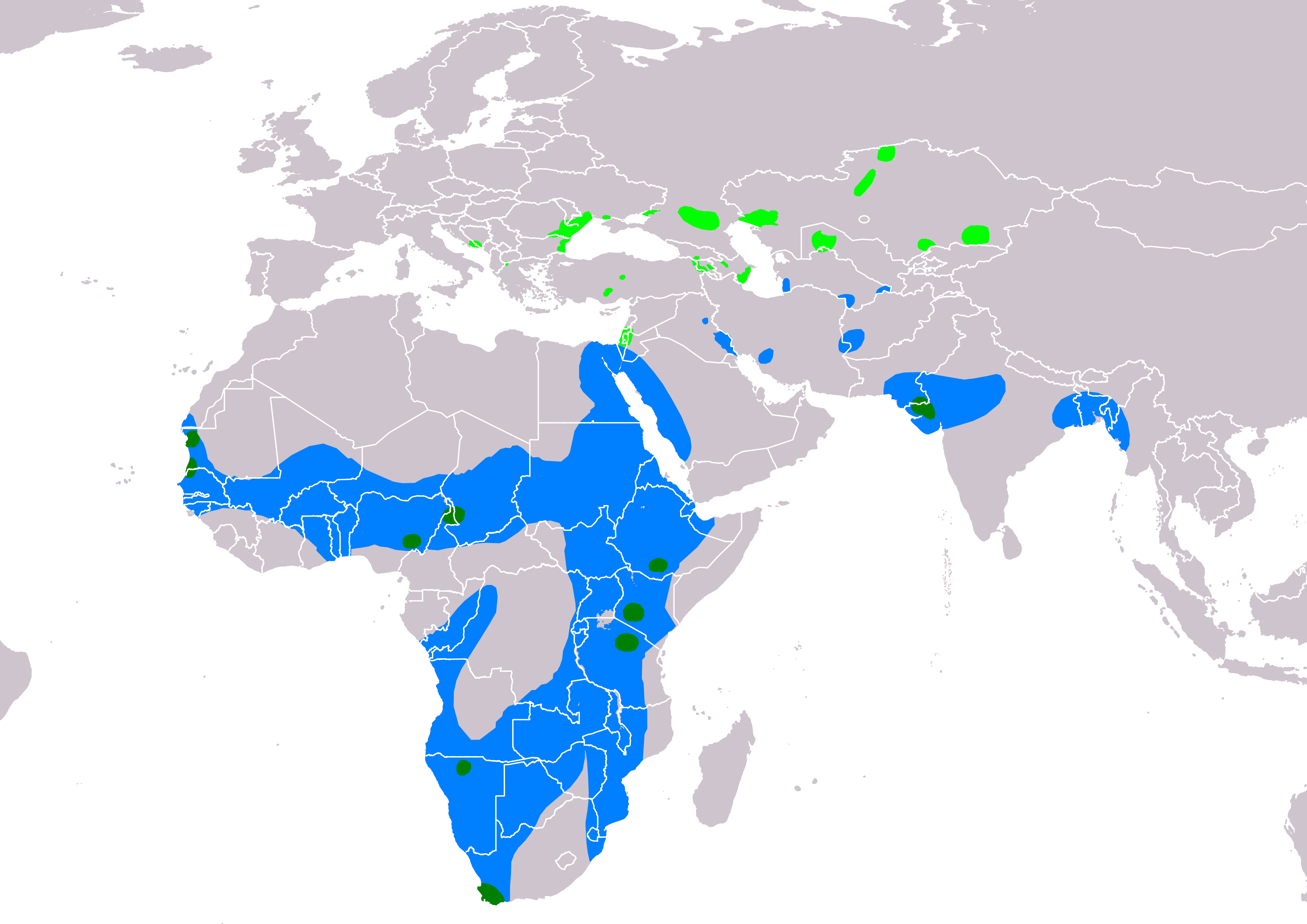
- Range of P. onocrotalus Breeding Resident Non-breeding

= Great white pelican =

Species of bird

The great white pelican (Pelecanus onocrotalus), also known as the eastern white pelican (in contrast to the western pelican of the Americas), rosy pelican or simply white pelican, is a bird in the pelican family. It breeds from southeastern Europe through Asia and Africa, in swamps and shallow lakes.

The great white pelican has been rated as a species of least concern on the IUCN Red List of Endangered Species (IUCN). It is listed under Appendix I of the Convention on the Conservation of Migratory Species of Wild Animals, Annexure I under the EU Birds Directive on the Conservation of Wild Birds, and Appendix II of the Berne Convention on the Conservation of European Wildlife and Natural Habitats. It is also listed within 108 Special Protection Areas in the European Union. It occurs within 43 Important Bird Areas (IBAs) in its European range. It is one of the species to which the Agreement on the Conservation of African-Eurasian Migratory Waterbirds (AEWA) is applied.

== Taxonomy ==
The great white pelican was formally described in 1758 by the Swedish naturalist Carl Linnaeus in the tenth edition of his Systema Naturae under the current binomial name Pelecanus onocrotalus. The species is treated as monotypic: no subspecies are recognised. The specific epithet onocrotalus is Latin meaning "pelican"., itself derived from Hellenistic Greek: ὀνοκρόταλος : onokrótalos, literally, "one who brays like a donkey," from ὄνος : ónos "donkey", and κρόταλον : krótalon "clapper" in reference to its harsh mating calls.

== Description ==
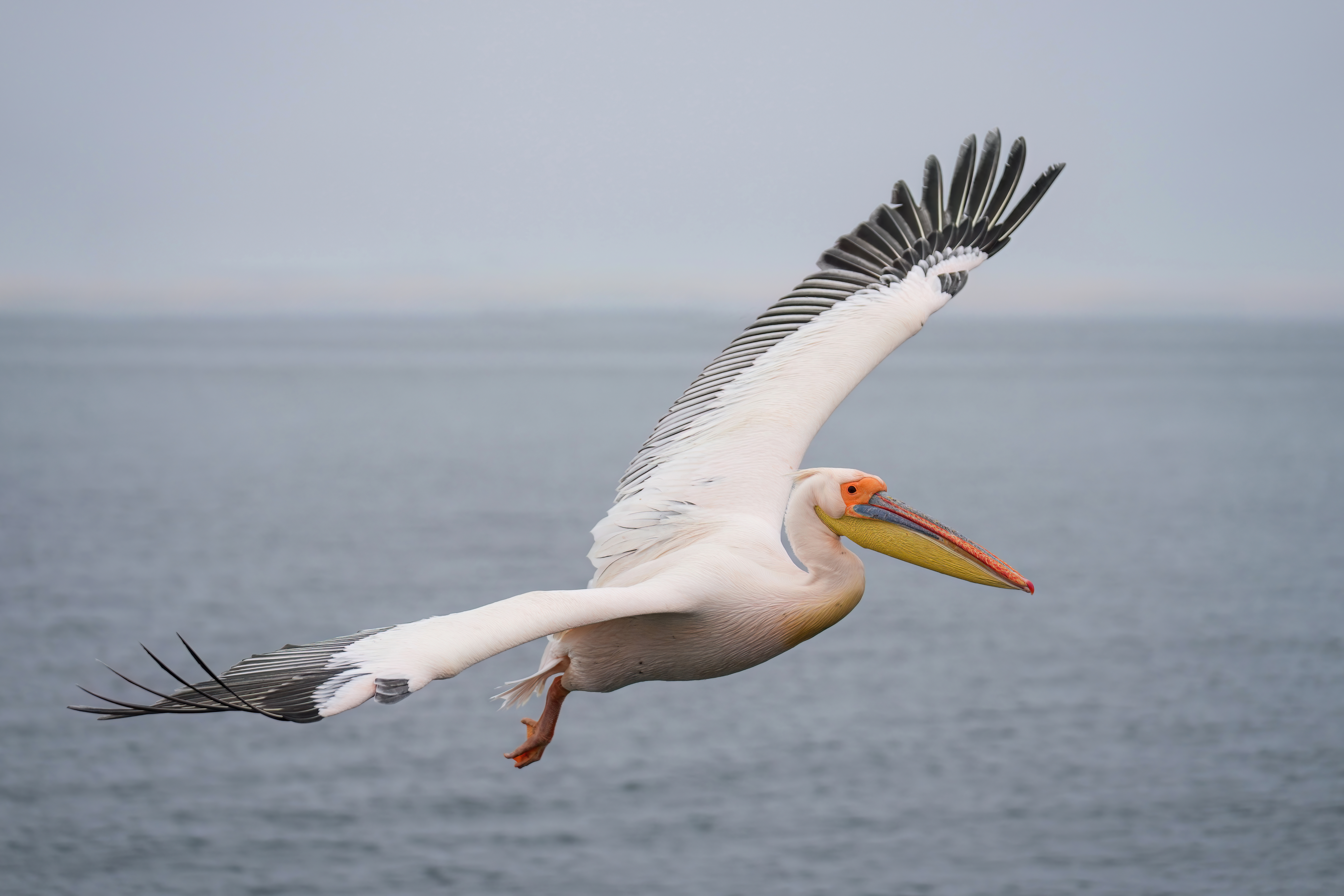
Great white pelican in flight at Pelican point, Namibia

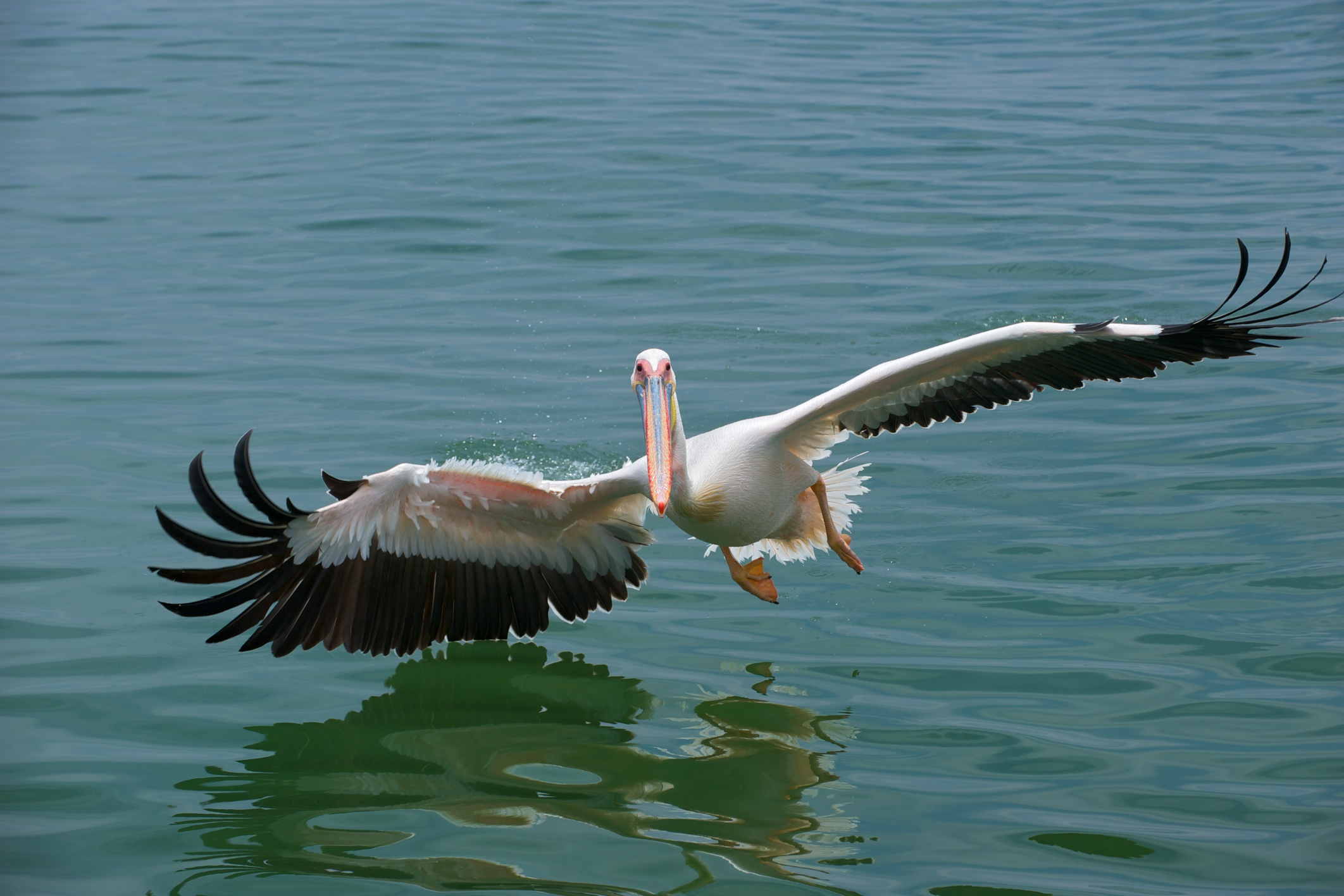
Great white pelican skimming the sea surface, in Namibia

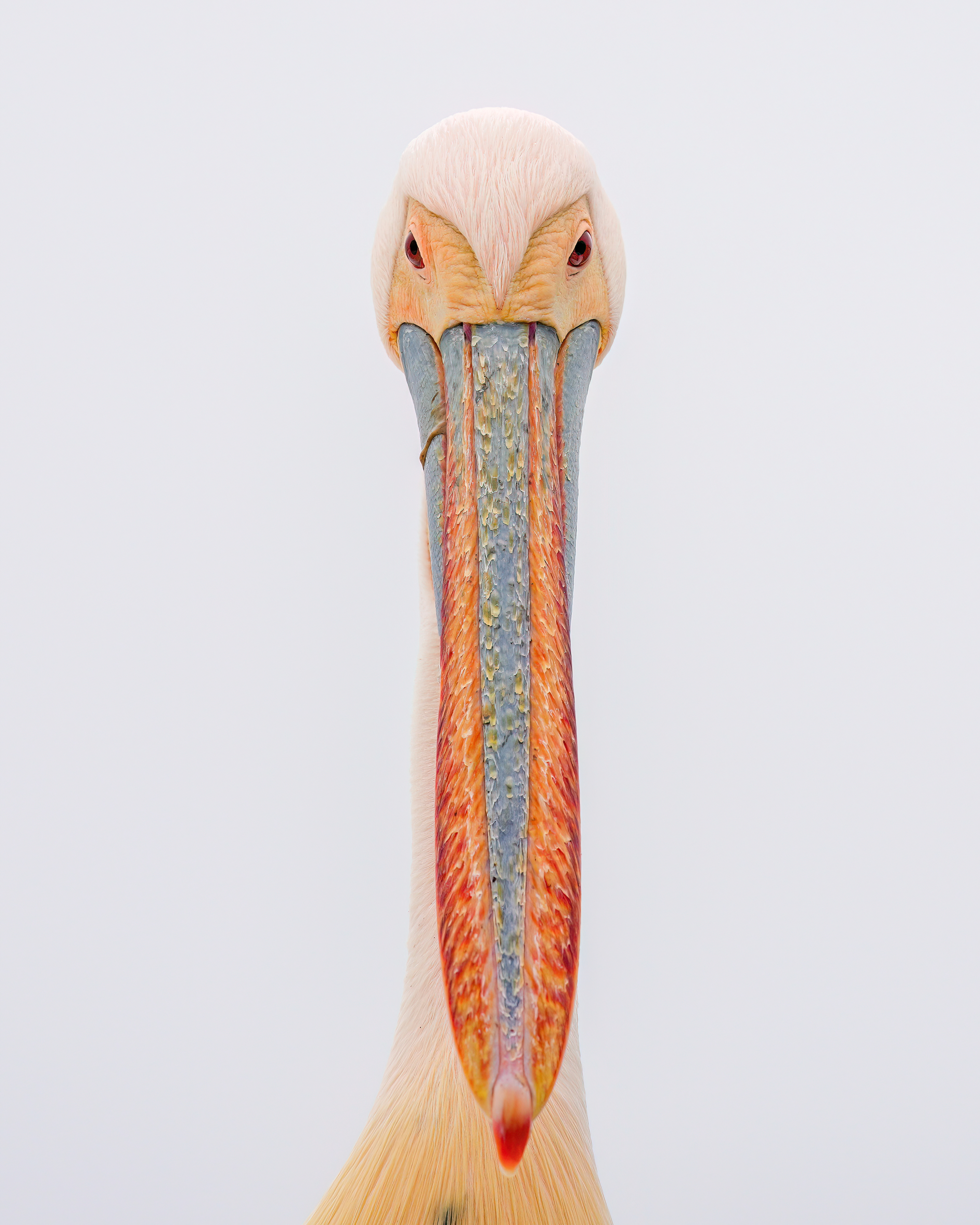
Great white pelican head close-up

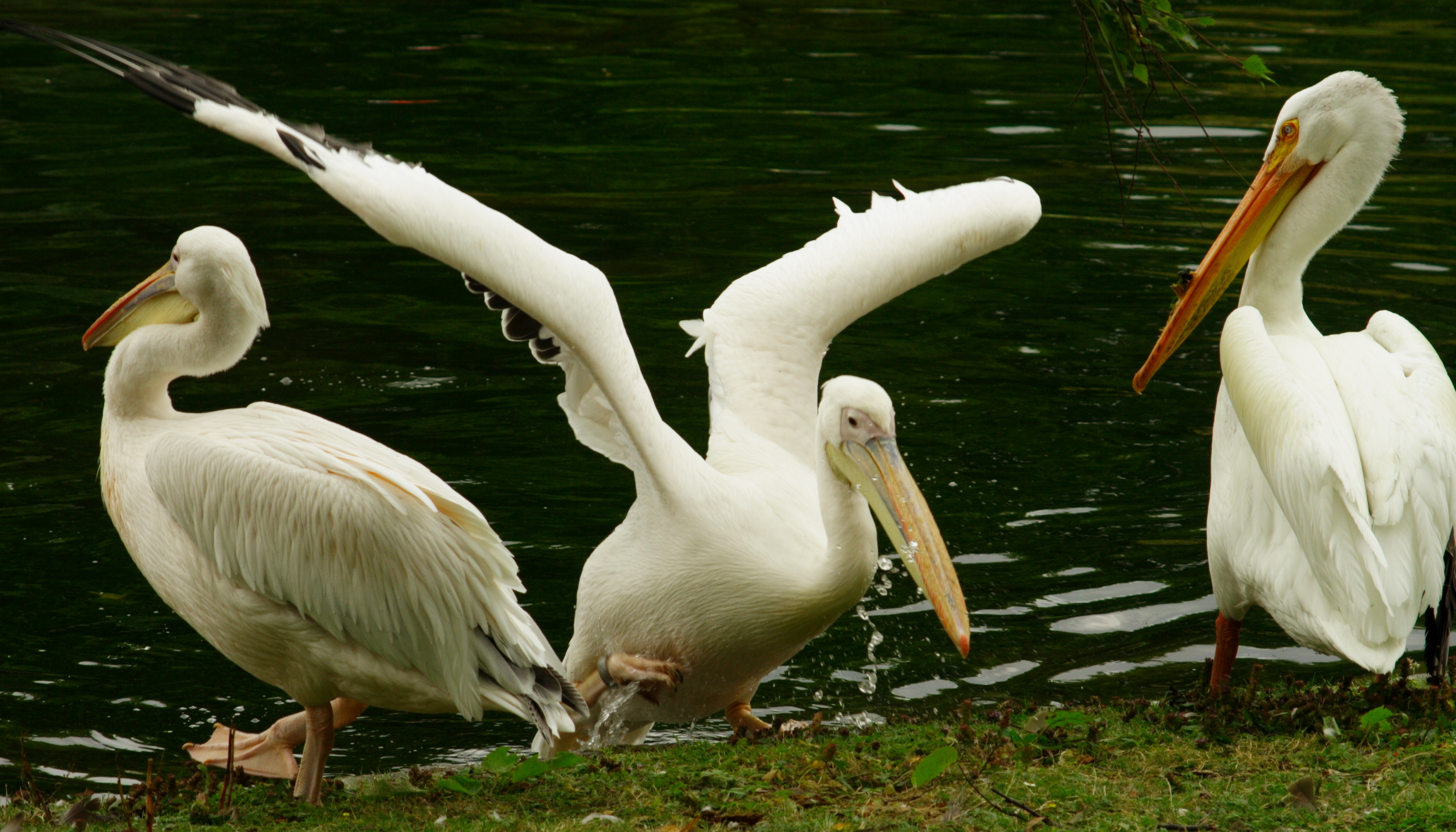
Two great white pelicans (left) and an American white pelican (Pelecanus erythrorhynchos) in St James's Park, London

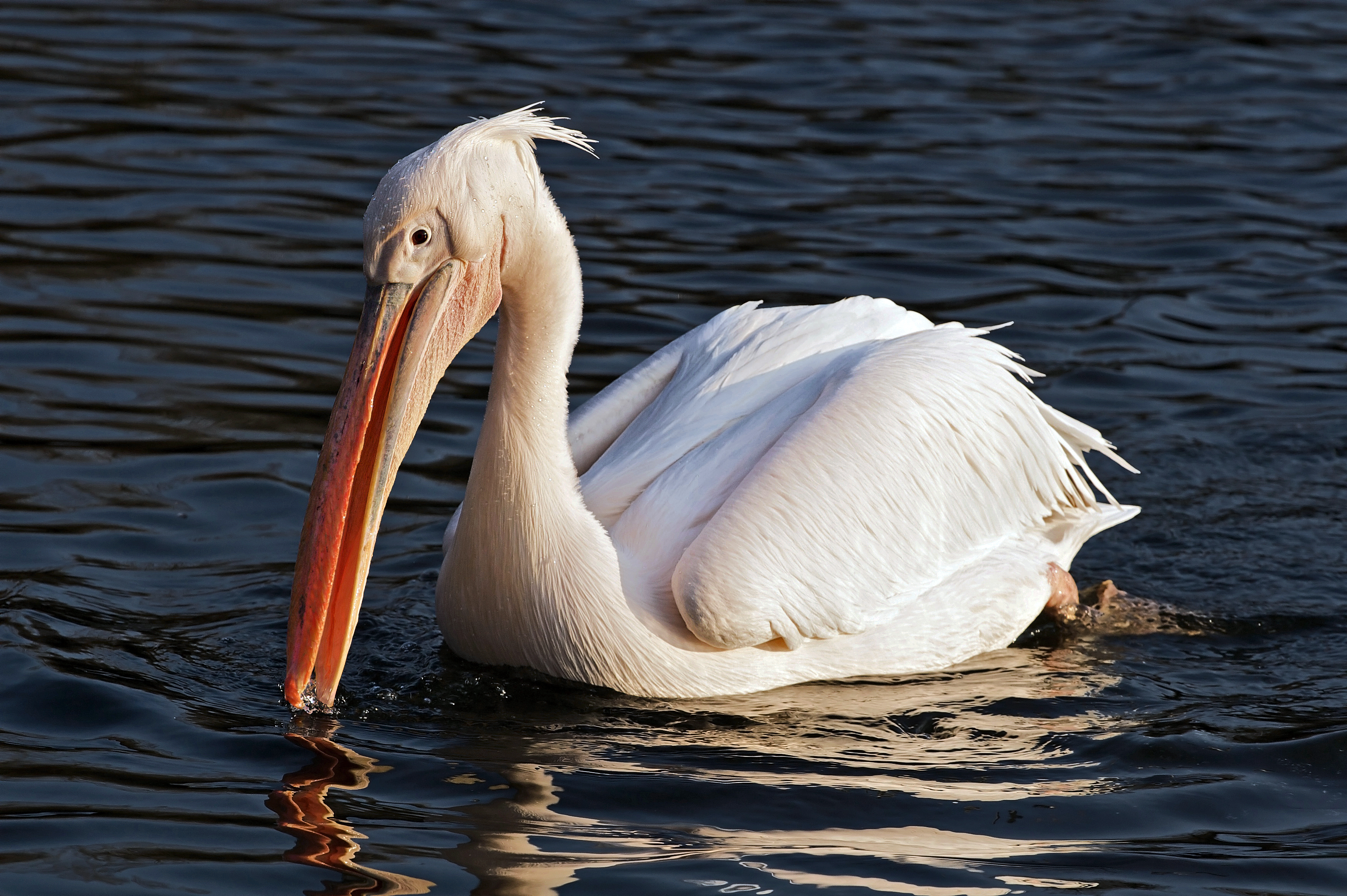
in St James' Park, London

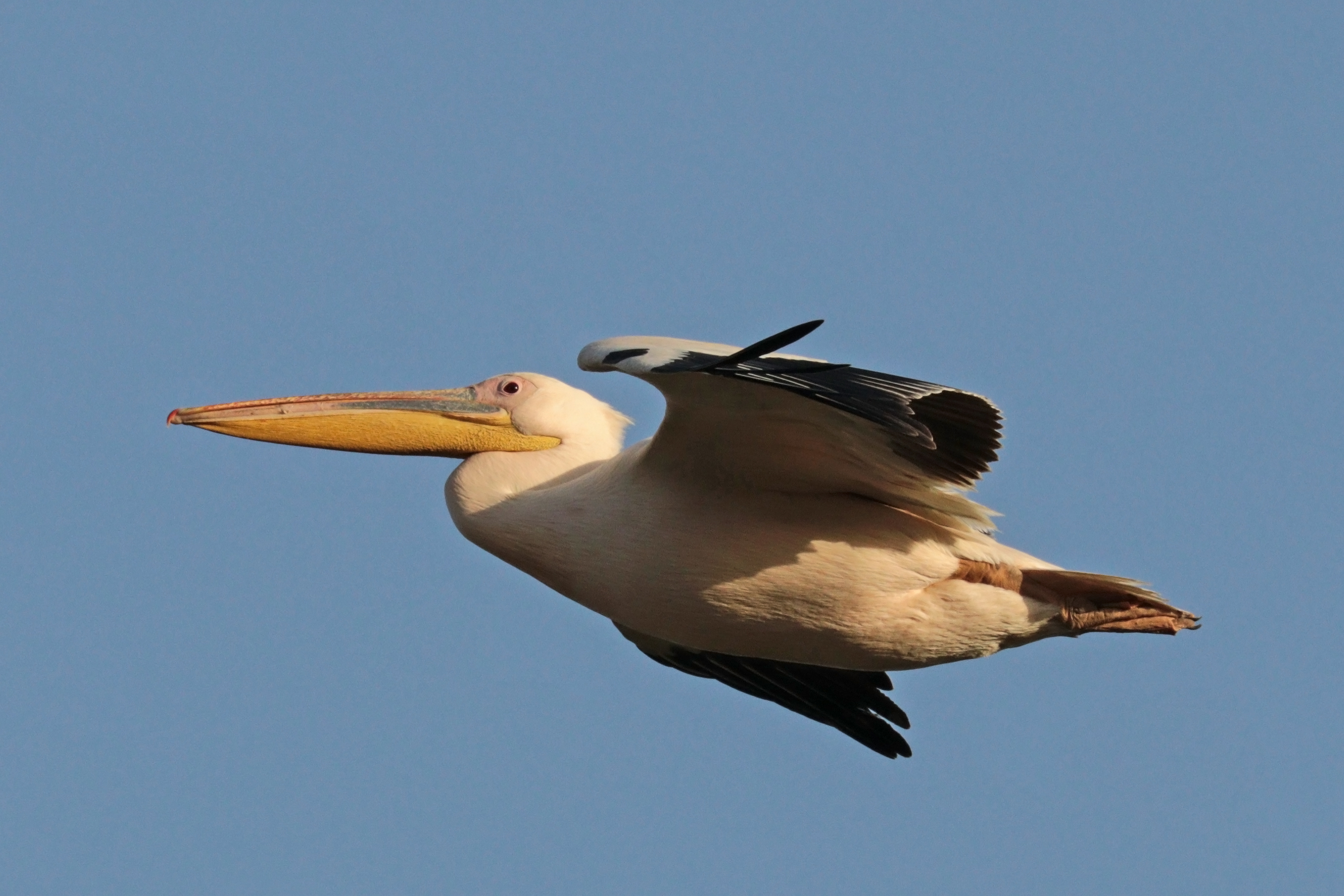
In Ethiopia

The great white pelican is a huge bird—only the Dalmatian pelican is, on average, larger among pelicans. It measures 140 to 180 cm (55 to 71 in) in length with a 28.9 to 47.1 cm (11.4 to 18.5 in) enormous pink and yellow bill, and a dull pale-yellow gular pouch. The wingspan measures 226 to 360 cm (7 ft 5 in to 11 ft 10 in), the latter measurement being the highest among extant flying animals outside of the great albatross. The adult male measures about 175 cm (69 in) in length; it weighs from 9 to 15 kg (20 to 33 lb) and larger races from the Palaearctic are usually around 11 kg (24 lb), with few exceeding 13 kg (29 lb). It has a bill measuring 34.7 to 47.1 cm (13.7 to 18.5 in). The female measures about 148 cm (58 in) in length, and is considerably less bulky, weighing 5.4 to 9 kg (12 to 20 lb), and has a bill that measures 28.9 to 40.0 cm (11.4 to 15.7 in) in length. In Lake Edward, Uganda, the average weight of 52 males was found to be 11.45 kg (25.2 lb) and in 22 females it was 7.59 kg (16.7 lb). In South Africa, the average weight of males was 9.6 kg (21 lb) and of females was 6.9 kg (15 lb). Thus the sexual dimorphism is especially pronounced in this species (perhaps the greatest known in any extant pelican), as at times the male can average more than 30% more massive than the female. The great white pelican rivals the kori bustard, which has even more pronounced sexual dimorphism, as the heaviest flying bird to reside in Africa (both averaging perhaps slightly heavier than the cape vulture and the wattled crane). There are a small few slightly heavier flying birds in the Eurasian portions of the range. Among standard measurements, the wing chord is 60 to 73 cm (24 to 29 in), the tail 16 to 21 cm (6.3 to 8.3 in), and the tarsus 13 to 14.9 cm (5.1 to 5.9 in) long. Standard measurements from different areas indicate that pelicans from the Western Palaearctic are somewhat larger than those from Asia and Africa.

The male has a downward bend in the neck and the female has a shorter, straighter beak. The plumage is predominantly white except on remiges, with a faint pink tinge on the neck and a yellowish base on the foreneck. The primary feathers are black, with white shafts at the bases, occasionally with paler tips and narrow fringes. The secondary feathers are also black, but with a whitish fringe. The upperwing coverts, underwing coverts, and tertials are white. The forehead is swollen and pinkish skin surrounds the bare, dark eyes having brown-red to dark brown irides. It has fleshy-yellow legs and pointed forehead-feathers where meeting the culmen. In breeding season, the male has pinkish skin while the female has orangey skin on its face. The bill is mostly bluish grey, with a red tip, reddish maxilla edges, and a cream-yellow to yolk-yellow gular pouch. The white plumage becomes tinged-pink with a yellow patch on the breast, and the body is tinged yellowish-rosy. It also has a short, shaggy crest on the nape. The white covert feathers contrast with the solid black primary and secondary feathers. The legs are yellow-flesh to pinkish orange. Both male and female are similar, but the female is smaller and has brighter orange facial skin in the breeding season.

The juvenile has darker, brownish underparts that are palest at the rump, center of the belly, and uppertail coverts. The underwing coverts are mostly dull-white, but the greater coverts are dark and there is a dark brownish bar over the lesser coverts. The rear tertials upperwing coverts mostly have paler tips with a silvery-grey tinge on the greater secondary coverts and tertials. It has dark flight feathers, and brown-edged wings. The head, neck, and upperparts, including the upperwing coverts, are mostly brown—this is the darkest part of the neck. The facial skin and the bill, including its gular pouch, are greyish to dusky greyish. The forehead, rump, and abdomen are white, and its legs and feet are grey. Its blackish tail occasionally has a silvery-grey tinge. Its underparts and back are initially browner and darker than those of the Dalmatian pelican, and the underwing is strongly patterned, similar to the juvenile brown pelican.

The great white pelican is distinguished from all other pelicans by its plumage. Its face is naked and the feathering on its forehead tapers to a fine point, whereas other species are completely feathered. In flight, the white underwing with black remiges of the adult are similar only to those of the American white pelican (P. erythrorhynchos), but the latter has white inner secondary feathers. It differs from the Dalmatian pelican in its pure white – rather than greyish-white – plumage, a bare pink facial patch around the eye, and pinkish legs. The spot-billed pelican (P. philippensis) of Asia is slightly smaller than the great white pelican, with greyish tinged white plumage, and a paler, duller-colored bill. Similarly, the pink-backed pelican (P. rufescens) is smaller, with brownish-grey plumage, a light pink to off-grey bill, and a pinkish wash on the back.

The bird is mostly silent but has a variety of low-pitched lowing, grunting, and growling calls. The flight call is a deep, quiet croak., while at breeding colonies, it gives deep moooo calls.

== Distribution and habitat ==
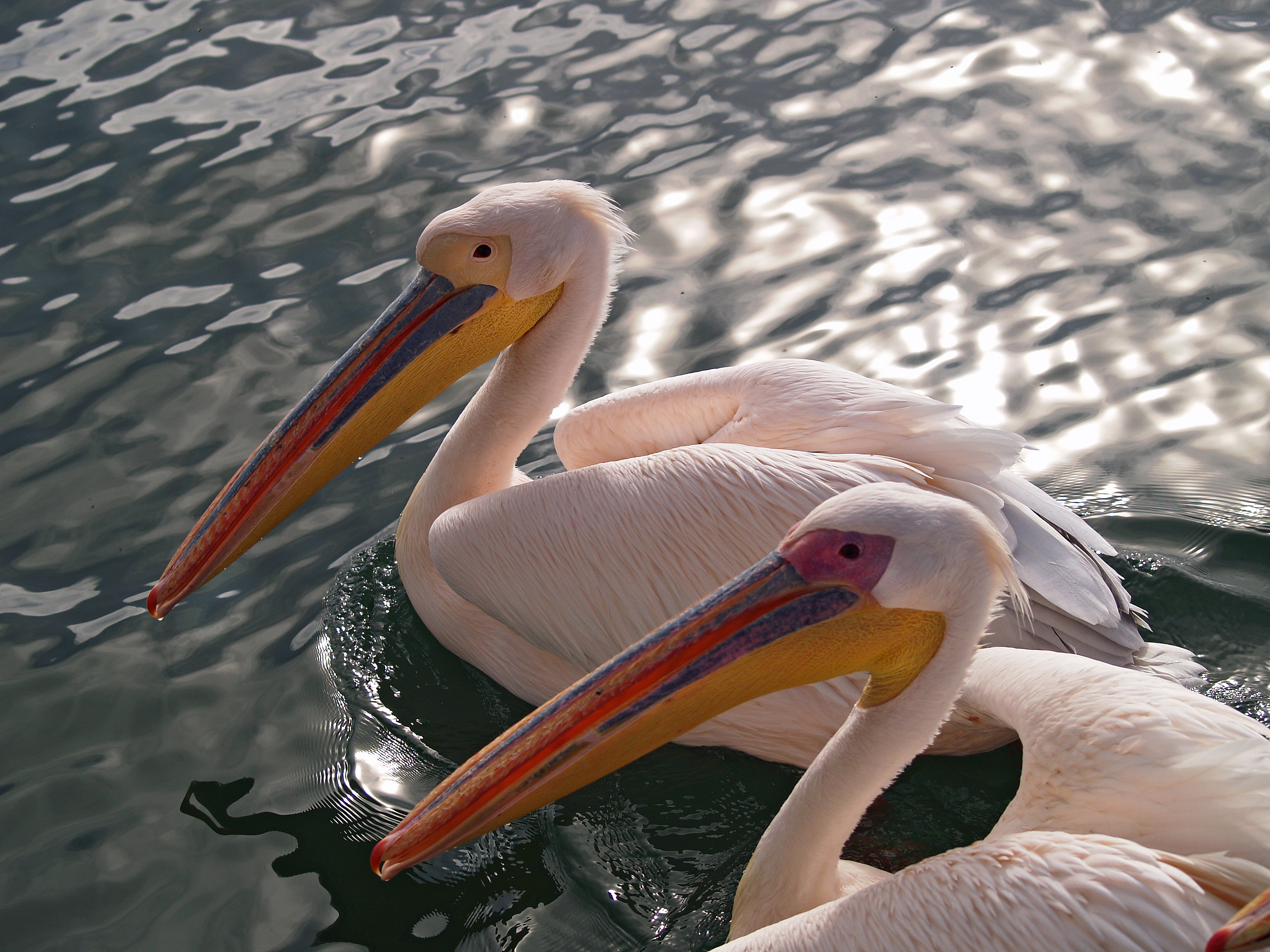
A pair in breeding condition in Walvis Bay, Namibia

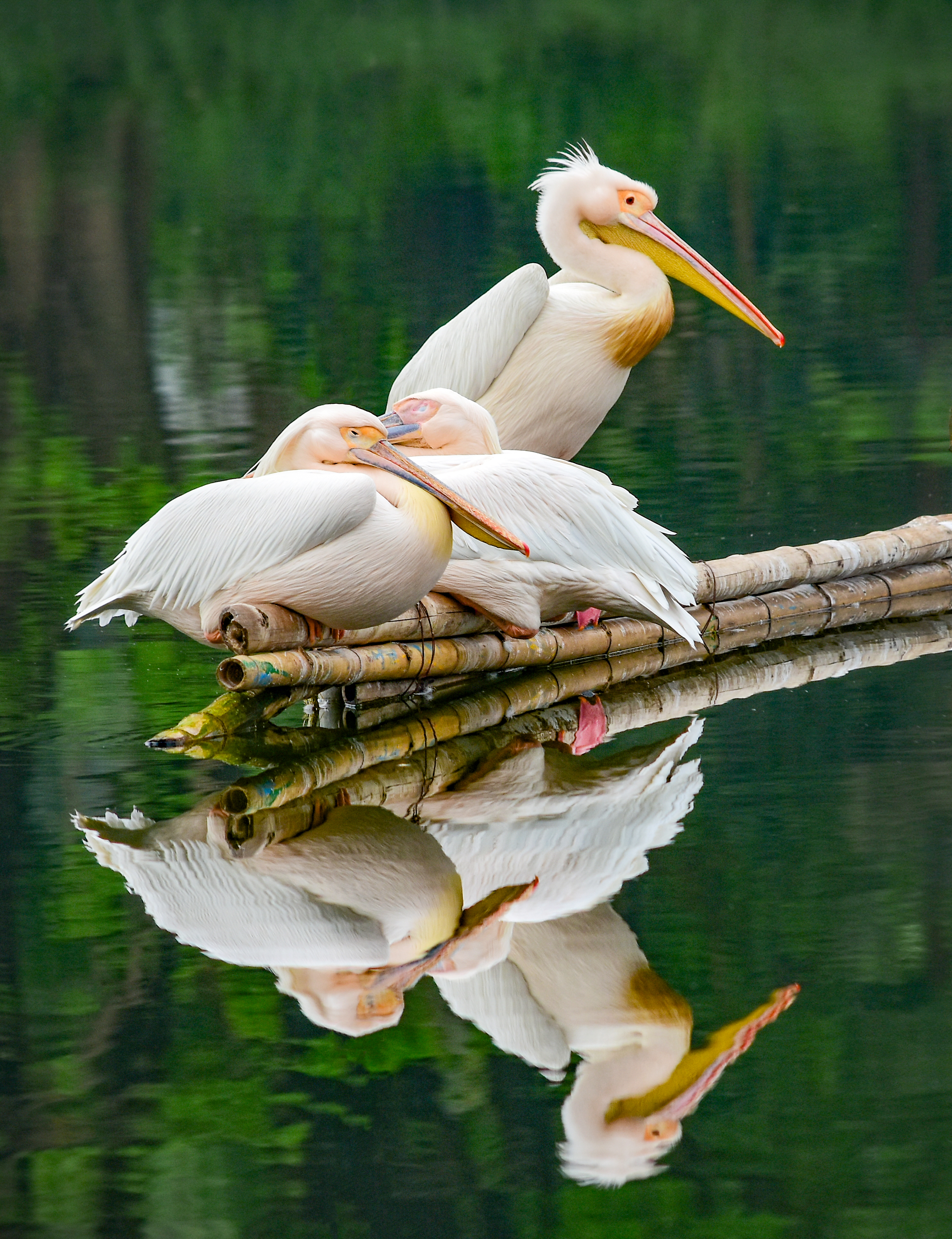
In Bangladesh

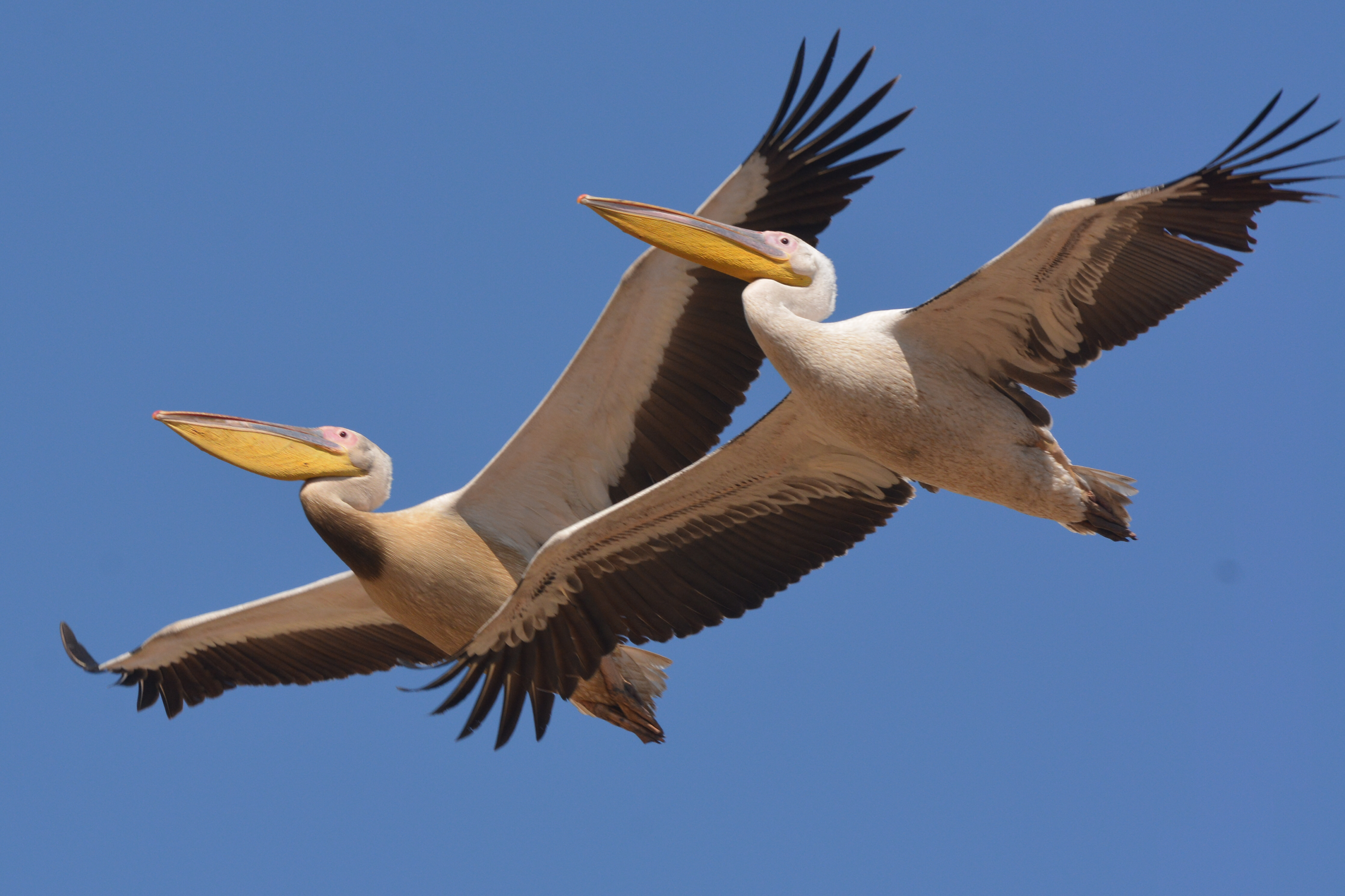
Two white pelicans flying in formation (Botswana)

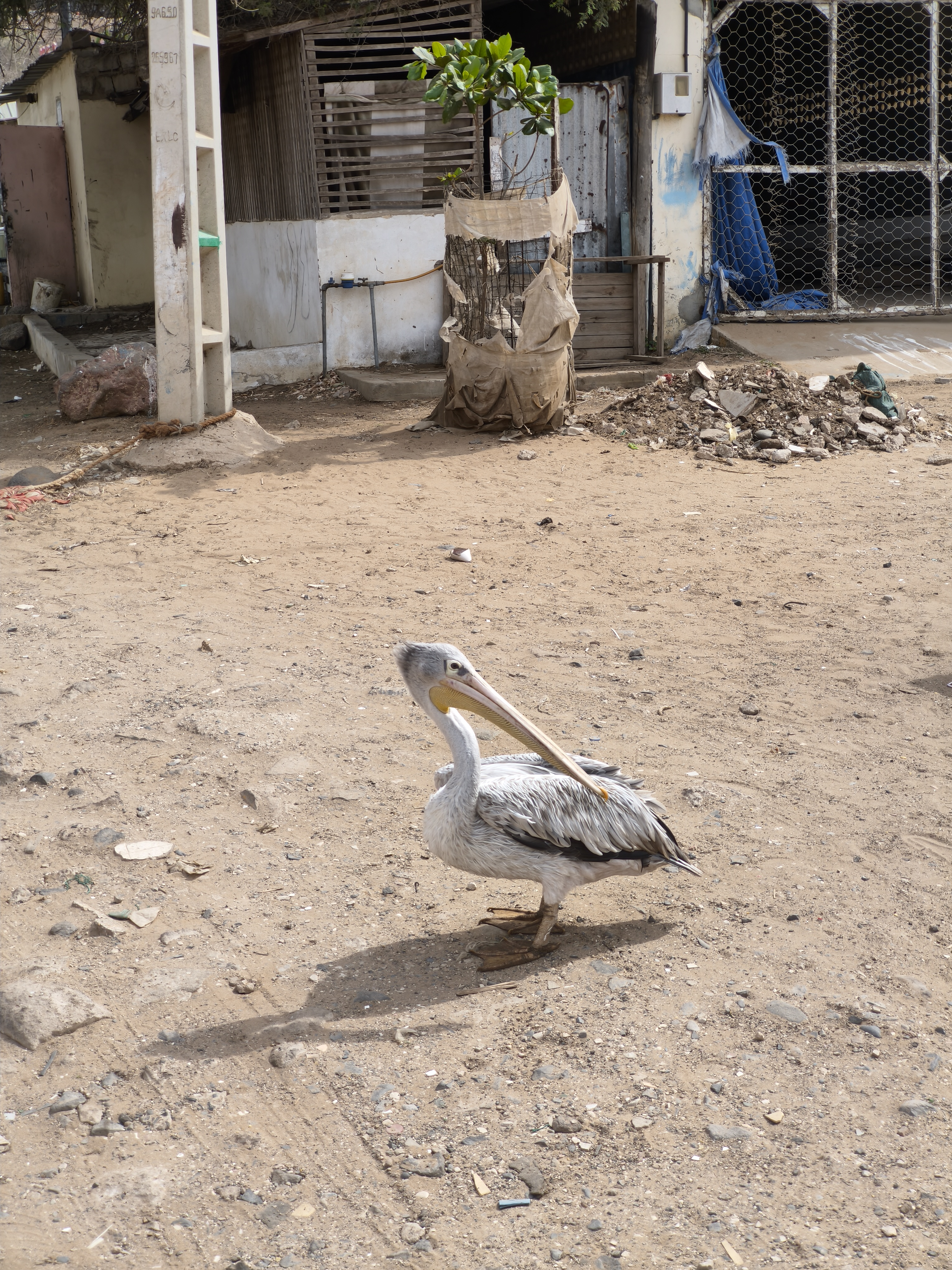
In Senegal

The breeding range of the great white pelican extends to Ethiopia, Tanzania, Chad, northern Cameroons, and Nigeria in Africa, and has been observed or reported breeding in Zambia, Botswana, and South Africa. In the 1990s, 6,700 to 11,000 breeding pairs in 23 to 25 breeding sites, were found in the Palearctic region. A 1991 study noted about 3,070 to 4,300 pairs were present in the Soviet Union. Only two breeding colonies are located in the Mediterranean basin, one having 250 to 400 pairs in Turkey and the other having 50 to 100 pairs in northern Greece. The breeding colony at Lake Rukwa, Tanzania, is the largest known breeding colony in Africa, followed by the Lake Shala, Ethiopia colony which is probably of crucial importance to the species in Africa. The African population of about 75,000 pairs of the great white pelican is resident. The ones breeding in the Palearctic region are migrants, although it is possible that the majority of the western Palearctic populations stop-over in Israel during their autumn migration. The migration routes are only partially known. Migratory populations are found from Eastern Europe to Kazakhstan during the breeding season. More than 50% of Eurasian great white pelicans breed in the Danube Delta in Romania. They also prefer staying in the Lakes near Burgas, Bulgaria and in Srebarna Lake in Bulgaria. The pelicans arrive in the Danube in late March or early April and depart after breeding from September to late November. Wintering locations for European pelicans are not exactly known but wintering birds may occur in northeastern Africa through Iraq to north India, with a particularly large number of breeders from Asia wintering around Pakistan and Sri Lanka. Northern populations migrate to China, India, Myanmar, with stragglers reaching Java and Bali in Indonesia. These are birds that are found mostly in lowlands, though in East Africa and Nepal may be found living at elevations of up to 1,372 m (4,501 ft).

Overall, the great white pelican is one of the most widely distributed species. Although some areas still hold quite large colonies, it ranks behind the brown pelican and possibly the Australian pelican in overall abundance. Europe now holds an estimated 7,345–10,000 breeding pairs, with over 4,000 pairs that are known to nest in Russia. During migration, more than 75,000 have been observed in Israel and, in winter, over 45,000 may stay in Pakistan. In all its colonies combined, 75,000 pairs are estimated to nest in Africa. It is possibly extinct in Serbia and Montenegro, and regionally extinct in Hungary.

Great white pelicans usually prefer shallow, (seasonally or tropical) warm fresh water. Well scattered groups of breeding pelicans occur through Eurasia from the eastern Mediterranean to Vietnam. In Eurasia, fresh or brackish waters may be inhabited and the pelicans may be found in lakes, deltas, lagoons and marshes, usually with dense reed beds nearby for nesting purposes. Additionally, sedentary populations are found year-round in Africa, south of the Sahara Desert although these are patchy. In Africa, great white pelicans occur mainly around freshwater and alkaline lakes and may also be found in coastal, estuarine areas. Beyond reed beds, African pelicans have nested on inselbergs and flat inshore islands off of Banc d'Arguin National Park.

== Behavior ==
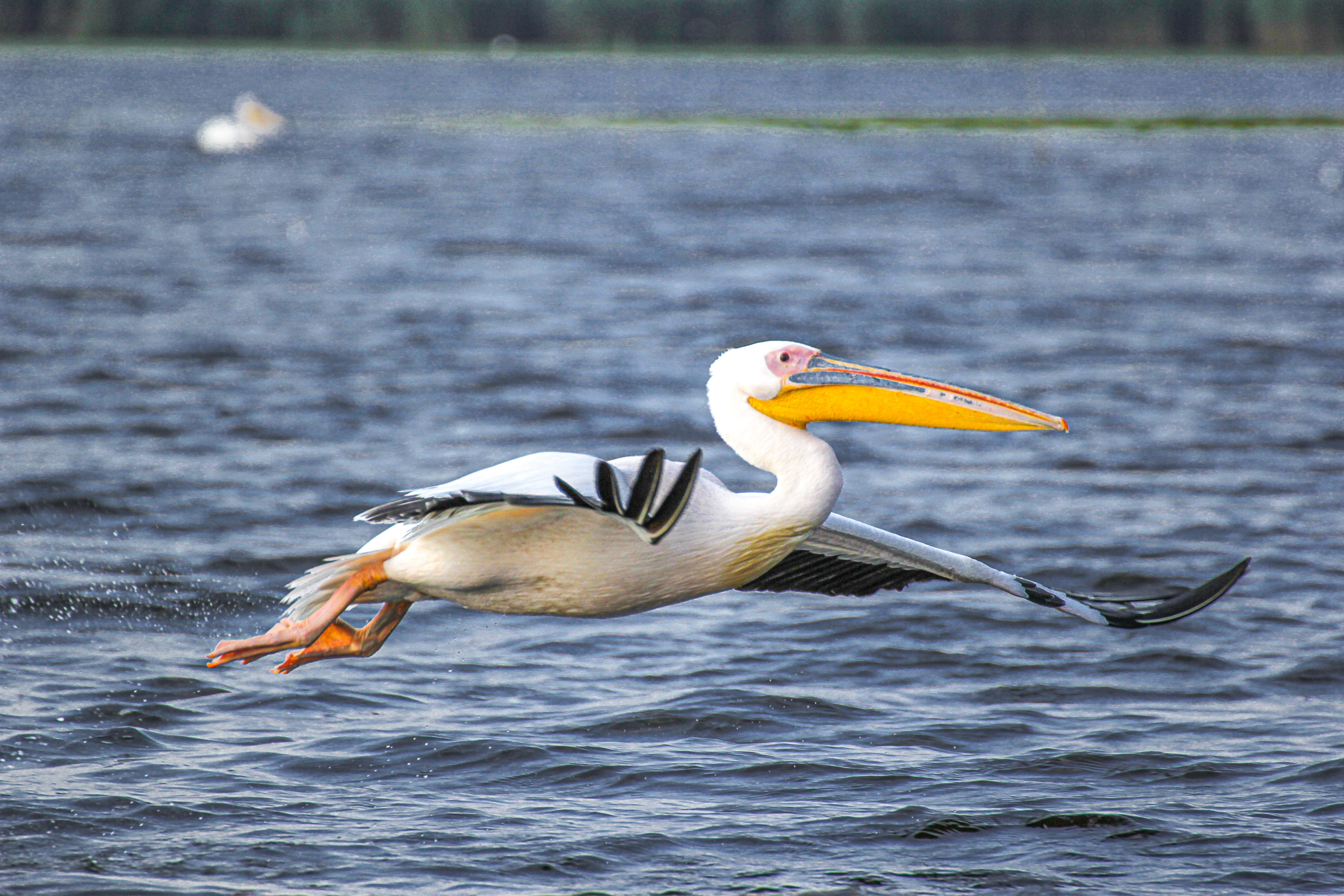
Pelican taking off from the water in the Danube Delta, Romania

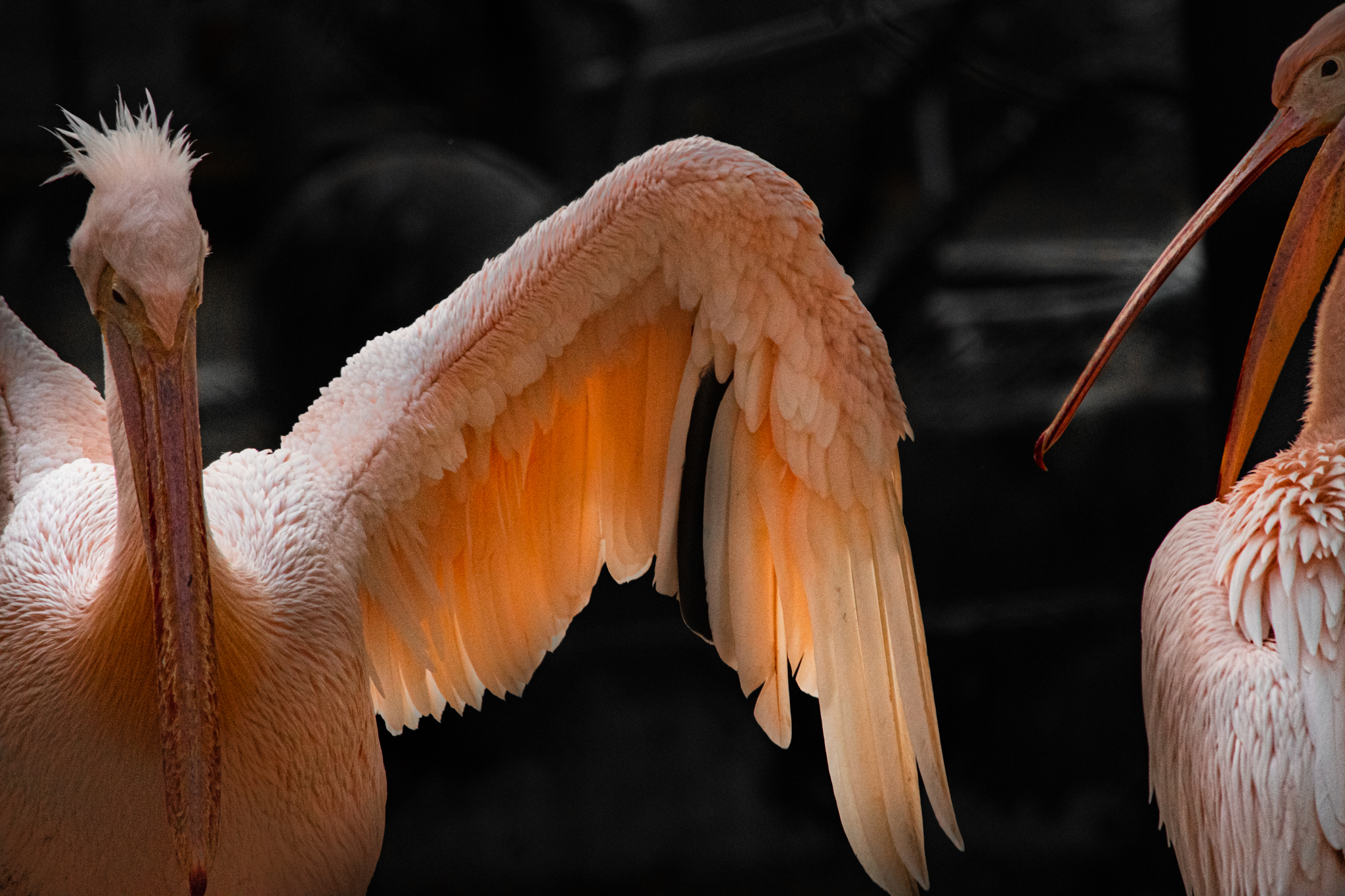
Rosy pelicans in full breeding plumage preening on shore

The great white pelican is highly sociable and often forms large flocks. It is well adapted for aquatic life. The short strong legs and webbed feet propel it in water and aid a rather awkward takeoff from the water surface. In flight, it is an elegant soaring bird, with the head held close to and aligned with the body. Its flight consists of a few slow wingbeats followed by a glide. Once aloft, the long-winged pelicans are powerful fliers, however, and often travel in spectacular linear, circular, or V-formation groups.

=== Feeding ===
The great white pelican foraging in Park of the Golden Head, Lyon

The great white pelican mainly eats fish. It leaves its roost to feed early in the morning and may fly over 100 km (62 mi) in search of food, as has been observed in Chad and in Mogode, Cameroon. It needs from 0.9 to 1.4 kg (2.0 to 3.1 lb) of fish every day, which corresponds to around 28,000,000 kg (62,000,000 lb) annual fish consumption at the largest colony of the great white pelican, on Tanzania's Lake Rukwa (with almost 75,000 birds). Fish targeted are usually fairly large ones, in the 500–600 g (1.1–1.3 lb) weight range and up to 1.8 kg (4.0 lb), and are taken based on regional abundance. Common carp are preferred in Europe, mullets in China, and Arabian toothcarp in India. In Africa, often the commonest cichlids, including many species in the Haplochromis and Tilapia genera, seem to be preferred.

The pelican's pouch serves simply as a scoop. As the pelican pushes its bill underwater, the lower bill bows out, creating a large pouch which fills with water and fish. As it lifts its head, the pouch contracts, forcing out the water but retaining the fish. A group of 6 to 8 great white pelicans gather in a horseshoe formation in water to feed together. They dip their bills in unison, creating a circle of open pouches, ready to trap every fish in the area. Most feeding is cooperative and done in groups, especially in shallow waters where fish schools can be corralled easily, though they may also forage alone as well.

Great white pelicans are not restricted to fish, however, and are often opportunistic foragers. In some situations, they eat chicks of other birds, such as the well documented case off the southwest coast of South Africa. Here, breeding pelicans from the Dassen Island prey on chicks weighing up to 2 kg (4.4 lb) from the Cape gannet colony on Malgas Island. Similarly, in Walvis Bay, Namibia the eggs and chicks of Cape cormorants are fed regularly to young pelicans. The local pelican population is so reliant on the cormorants, that when the cormorant species experienced a population decline, the numbers of pelicans appeared to decline as well.

They also rob other birds of their prey. During periods of starvation, they also eat seagulls and ducklings. The gulls are held under water and drowned before being eaten headfirst. A flock of captive great white pelicans in St James's Park, London is well known for occasionally eating local pigeons, despite being well-fed.

=== Breeding ===
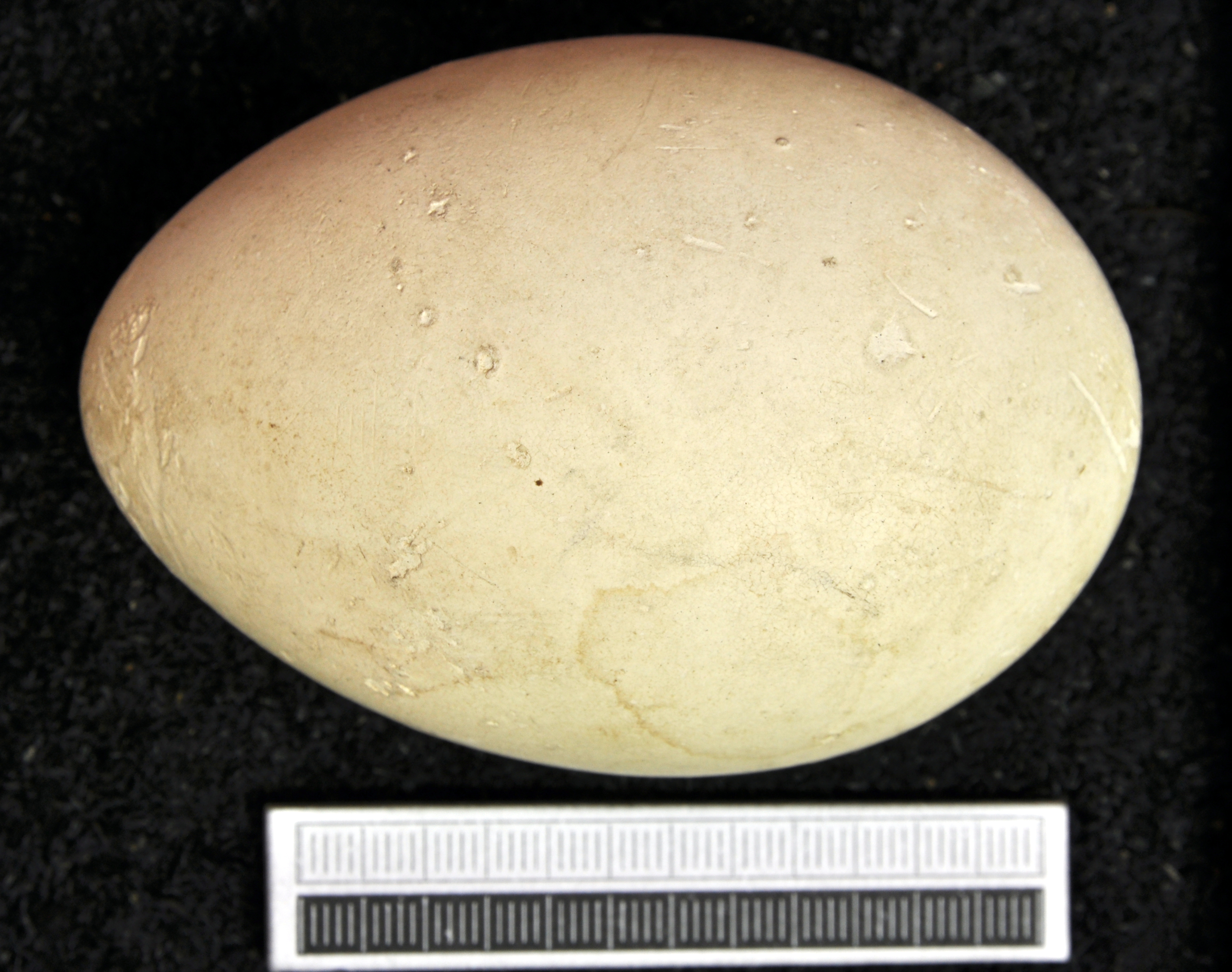
Egg, Collection Museum Wiesbaden

The breeding season commences in April or May in temperate zones, is essentially all year around in Africa, and runs February through April in India. Large numbers of these pelicans breed together in colonies. Nest locations vary: some populations make stick nests in trees but a majority, including all those that breed in Africa, nest exclusively in scrapes on the ground lined with grass, sticks, feathers, and other material.

The female can lay from one to four eggs in a clutch, with two being the average. Incubation takes 29 to 36 days. The chicks are naked when they hatch but quickly sprout blackish-brown down. The young are cared for by both parents. The colony gathers in "pods" around 20 to 25 days after the eggs hatch. The young fledge at 65 to 75 days of age. Around 64% of young successful reach adulthood, attaining sexual maturity at 3 to 4 years of age.

=== Predators ===
Predators of the pelicans' eggs and chicks include mammalian animals like foxes, gulls, frigatebirds, crows, skuas, African fish eagles (Haliaeetus vocifer), and marabou storks (Leptoptilos crumenifer). The adults have few predators on land other than humans and has no marine predator. However, in some regions of Africa, terrestrial predation occurs at night while roosting, caused by jackals, hyenas and lions. Additionally, crocodiles, especially Nile crocodiles, reportedly taken swimming pelicans.

== Status and conservation ==
Since 1998, the great white pelican has been rated as a species of least concern on the IUCN Red List of Endangered Species. This is because it has a large range – more than 20,000 km^{2} (7,700 sq mi) – and because its population is thought not to have declined by 30% over ten years or three generations, which is not a rapid enough decline to warrant a vulnerable rating. However, the state of its overall population is not known, and although it is widespread, it is not abundant anywhere. It is one of the species to which the Agreement on the Conservation of African-Eurasian Migratory Waterbirds (AEWA) applies. It is listed under the Appendix I of the Convention on the Conservation of Migratory Species of Wild Animals, Appendix II of the Berne Convention on the Conservation of European Wildlife and Natural Habitats and Annexure I of the EU Birds Directive on the Conservation of Wild Birds. It occurs within 43 Important Bird Areas in its European range, and is listed within 108 Special Protection Areas in the European Union. This species is often kept in captivity in zoos or in semi-wild colonies such as that in St. James's Park, London. The ancestors of this colony were originally given to Charles II by the Russian ambassador in 1664 which initiated the tradition of ambassadors donating the birds.

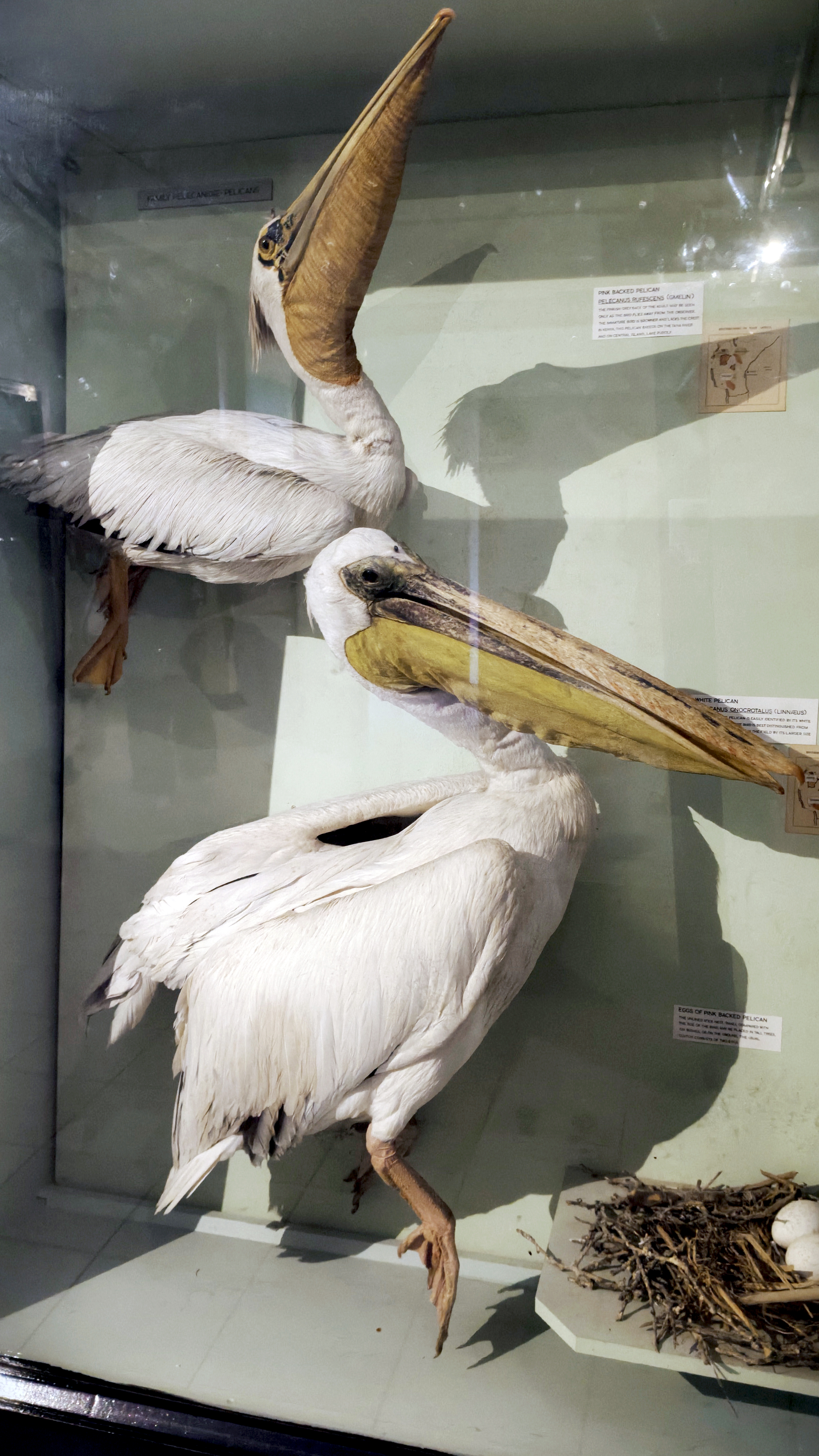
taxidermied Great white pelicans at Nairobi National Museum

Today, because of overfishing in certain areas, white pelicans are forced to fly long distances to find food. Adult birds can abandon breeding colonies due to the shortage of food supply. Also, human disturbance forced pelicans to leave their colonies temporarily, leaving chicks vulnerable to predation. Great white pelicans are exploited for many reasons. Their pouch is used to make tobacco bags, their skin is turned into leather, the guano is used as fertiliser, and the fat of its young is converted into oils for traditional medicine in China and India. In Ethiopia, great white pelicans are shot for their meat. Human disturbance, loss of foraging habitat and breeding sites, as well as pollution are all contributing to the decline of the great white pelican. Declines have been particularly notable in the Palaearctic.
