= Immigration to Nigeria =

Movement of people into Nigeria

Immigration to Nigeria refers to the movement of people from other countries into the Federal Republic of Nigeria for purposes such as work, trade, education, refuge, or family reunification. Nigeria, being the most populous country in Africa and one of the continent’s largest economies, has historically attracted migrants from neighboring West African states as well as from Asia, the Middle East, and Europe. Nigeria also receives refugees fleeing conflicts in neighbouring countries. These include Cameroonians displaced by the Anglophone Crisis, who have sought refuge in Nigeria since 2017. While migration policies are overseen by the Nigeria Immigration Service, patterns of immigration continue to evolve in response to regional integration, demographic pressures, and global mobility trends. In 2020, Nigeria had 1,308,568 registered foreign residents, representing approximately 0.6% of the total population, with 54% male and 46% female.

== History ==
Nigeria has long been a destination for various migratory movements. During the British colonial period, labor migration was encouraged within the territory and to neighboring colonies, as workers moved to urban centers, plantations, and other areas in search of economic opportunities. After gaining independence in 1960, migration continued to be shaped by economic factors, particularly during the oil boom of the 1970s. The rapid expansion of the petroleum industry created a high demand for both skilled and unskilled labor, attracting people from rural areas and neighboring countries. These historical movements contributed to Nigeria's demographic diversity.

Immigration to Nigeria has remained a consistent, though modest, phenomenon over the decades. The foreign resident population grew from 456,621 in 1990 to 969,174 by 2005. Political instability and security challenges have affected migration patterns, causing fluctuations in both emigration and immigration. Nigeria hosts refugees and asylum seekers from neighbouring countries. These include Cameroonians fleeing the Anglophone Crisis, as well as other African nationals seeking protection from conflict, persecution, or humanitarian crises. Such movements demonstrate Nigeria’s continued role as a regional destination for displaced populations despite internal challenges.

== Legal framework ==
Nigeria’s immigration system is governed by the Immigration Act of 2015 and related regulations, which establish the legal basis for entry, residence, and employment of foreign nationals. The framework outlines visa categories, residence permits, and the rights and responsibilities of immigrants, while also setting procedures for border control and enforcement. The Nigeria Immigration Service (NIS) is the primary agency responsible for implementing these laws, managing ports of entry, and monitoring compliance. The legal framework aims to regulate migration in a way that supports national security, economic development, and humanitarian obligations, including the protection of refugees and asylum seekers under both domestic law and international agreements.

=== Regional free movement ===
The 1979 Protocol on Free Movement of Persons, Residence and Establishment of the Economic Community of West African States (ECOWAS), signed by Nigeria, provides for visa-free visits of up to 90 days by citizens of member states entering another member state through an official entry point. Article 3 requires a valid travel document and an international health certificate, and permission from the appropriate authority for stays exceeding 90 days. Article 4 allows member states to refuse admission to persons considered inadmissible under their domestic laws.

== Illegal immigration ==
As of 2013, illegal immigration in Nigeria is a serious problem and the border has become quite porous. According to the government there are 1,497 illegal migration points to enter the country. However, the NIS have only 84 authorised border control posts to guard the approximately 4047km long land border of Nigeria. They have admitted that they do not have enough personnel in order to effectively monitor their extensive borders (with around 25,000 officers). The government is investing millions to secure the border. People from Niger are the largest group of illegal immigrants.

== See also ==
- Demographics of Nigeria
