= Cameroonians in Nigeria =

- (Cameroon) (Nigeria)
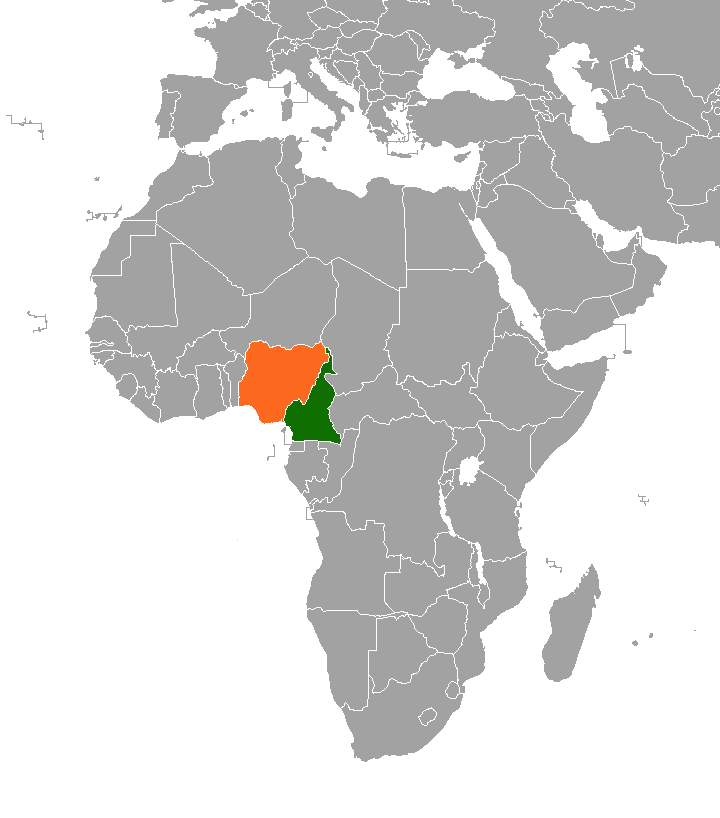

Total population
- 84,000+ (2023 estimate)

Regions with significant populations
- Cross River State, Taraba State, Benue State, Adamawa State and other border regions

Languages
- English (including Cameroonian English and Nigerian English), French, Fulfulde, Kanuri, and other local languages and languages of Nigeria

Religion
- Predominantly Christianity and Islam; also traditional beliefs

Cameroonian people in Nigeria are those individuals born in the Republic of Cameroon or citizens of Cameroonian nationality residing in the Federal Republic of Nigeria. Migration has been influenced by the countries’ long shared border, cross-cultural connections, and, in recent years, displacement resulting from the Anglophone Crisis in Cameroon.

== Overview ==
Before gaining independence, Nigeria and Cameroon were colonized by different European powers. Nigeria was under British rule, which influenced its political, legal, and educational systems, while Cameroon was initially a German colony and later divided between France (French Cameroon) and the United Kingdom (British Cameroons) after World War I under League of Nations mandates. These different colonial experiences shaped the countries’ languages, administrative structures, and cultural development.

These colonial legacies also influenced migration between the two countries. Shared borders, linguistic ties, and similar administrative systems made it easier for people to move for trade, education, and work. In recent decades, political instability and conflicts, have further increased migration, with many Cameroonians relocating to Nigeria in search of safety, better economic opportunities, and community networks.

Linguistic connections play an important role in cross-border relations. English is widely spoken in both countries — Nigeria as its official language, and Cameroon in its Anglophone regions — making communication, trade, and migration easier. Several local languages are also shared across the border, particularly in northern regions; Hausa, Fulfulde, and Kanuri are commonly spoken, while other minority languages exist in border areas. These shared languages help maintain cultural connections and facilitate social and economic interactions.

The Boko Haram insurgency has generated significant migratory movements across the Cameroon–Nigeria border. Violence in northeastern Nigeria has forced thousands of Nigerians to seek refuge in Cameroon, while attacks and insecurity in Cameroon's Far North region have also led many Cameroonians to cross into Nigeria. These bidirectional flows of displaced people reflect the cross-border nature of the conflict and the shared humanitarian challenges faced by both countries. Despite this, the border regions support a dynamic cross-border economy. Trade in agricultural products, textiles, and other consumer goods occurs through formal border posts as well as informal markets. Local communities often rely on this commerce for their livelihoods, with Nigerian and Cameroonian traders interacting regularly. This economic activity reinforces migration patterns and cultural exchange between the two nations.

Religious practices form another point of connection for migrants. Christianity, including Protestant and Catholic denominations, is widely practiced in both countries’ southern and Anglophone regions. Traditional spiritualities and local belief systems also persist, influencing cultural practices and community life. Shared religious and spiritual traditions help strengthen social networks and integration among Cameroonians living in Nigeria. Faith-based organizations from both Nigeria and Cameroon have played a role in supporting Cameroonian refugees and displaced persons living in Nigerian territory. Churches along the border regions have provided food, temporary shelter, and psychosocial assistance, often coordinating with humanitarian agencies to address urgent needs. Joint initiatives between Nigerian and Cameroonian religious leaders have also focused on advocacy for peace and on creating safe spaces for education and community integration. These efforts complement the work of international organizations by offering local networks of solidarity and practical aid to affected populations.

== Anglophone Crisis ==
The Anglophone Crisis in Cameroon, which began in 2016 and intensified in 2017 following a declaration of independence by separatist groups, has led to significant displacement. As of August 2024, over 1.5 million people were displaced within Cameroon, with many fleeing violence and seeking refuge in neighbouring Nigeria. The majority of these asylum seekers have arrived in Nigeria's Akwa Ibom, Benue, Cross River, and Taraba states. In response, the Nigerian government, with support from the United Nations High Commissioner for Refugees (UNHCR), has granted Temporary Protection Status to Cameroonian refugees and established settlements to provide shelter and services. Despite these efforts, challenges remain, including limited resources and the need for continued international support to ensure the safety and well-being of displaced individuals.

=== Human trafficking ===
Reports from churches and civil society organizations indicate that thousands of Cameroonians, particularly from the Anglophone regions, have been trafficked into Nigeria in recent years. Many of them were recruited with false promises of work opportunities in other West African countries but were diverted into Nigeria, where they face conditions of forced labour and exploitation. Traffickers have been reported to confiscate travel documents and isolate victims from their families, while in some cases demanding additional money from relatives. Observers link the vulnerability of these migrants to the wider insecurity and economic disruption caused by the Anglophone crisis in Cameroon.

== See also ==
- Cameroon–Nigeria relations
- Nigerians in Cameroon
