= Alme (surname) =

Alme is a surname. Notable people with the surname include:

- Iselin Alme (born 1957), Norwegian singer and stage actress
- Joel Alme (born 1980), Swedish singer
- Kurt Alme (born 1966), American attorney and politician
- Øystein Alme (born 1960), Norwegian author

== See also ==
- Alme
