= Akwayafe River =

River in Cameroon and Nigeria

Coordinates: 4.626°N 8.4676°E

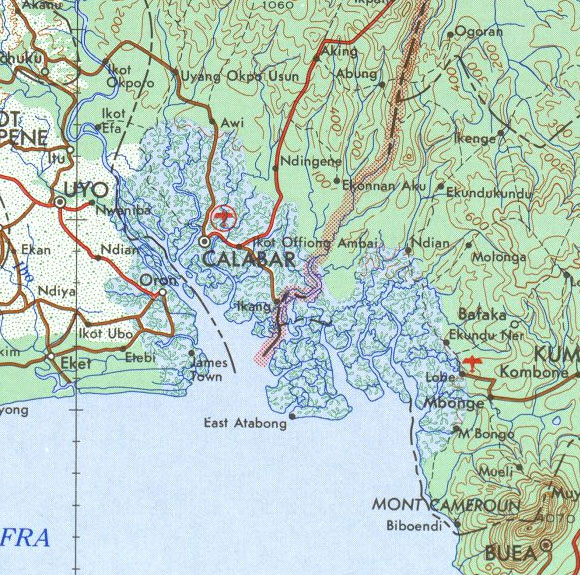

The Akwayafe River (also known as the Akpakorum River) is a river in Africa that empties into the Gulf of Guinea. The river forms a portion of the land boundary between Cameroon and Nigeria.

== Climate ==
Akwayafe River is a stream in Cameroon of Africa/Middle East. The river's coordinates are 4°40'60" N and 8°31'0" E in DMS.

== See also ==
- Communes of Cameroon
