= Bhedapu =

Bhedpu भेड्पु
- Village development committee
- Location in Nepal
- Coordinates: 27.54°N 86.05°E
- Country: Nepal
- Zone: Janakpur Zone
- District: Dolakha District

Government
  - Type: Democratic Nepali Congress
  - Ward Chairman: Chatraa Bdr. Tamang

Population (1991)
  - Total: 3,943
  - Density: 30/km^{2} (78/sq mi)
- Time zone: UTC+5:45 (Nepal Time)
- Website: www.bhedpu.com.np

Bhedpu is a village development committee in Dolakha District in the Janakpur Zone of north-eastern Nepal. At the time of the 1991 Nepal census it had a population of 3,943 people living in 767 individual households.
