= Dandakharka, Dolakha =

Dandakharka डाँडाखर्क
- Village development committee
- Location in Nepal
- Coordinates: 27.52°N 86.02°E
- Country: Nepal
- Zone: Janakpur Zone
- District: Dolakha District

Population (1991)
  - Total: 3,827
- Time zone: UTC+5:45 (Nepal Time)

VDC Map of Dolakha District

Dandakharka was a village development committee in Dolakha District in the Janakpur Zone of north-eastern Nepal. At the time of the 1991 Nepal census it had a population of 3,827 people living in 760 individual households. On 10 March 2017, the Nepalese government announced the dissolution of the village development committees and the formation of gaunpalika. The land previously administered by the Dandakharta village development committee was merged to form the Melung Rural Municipality.
