= Mogode =

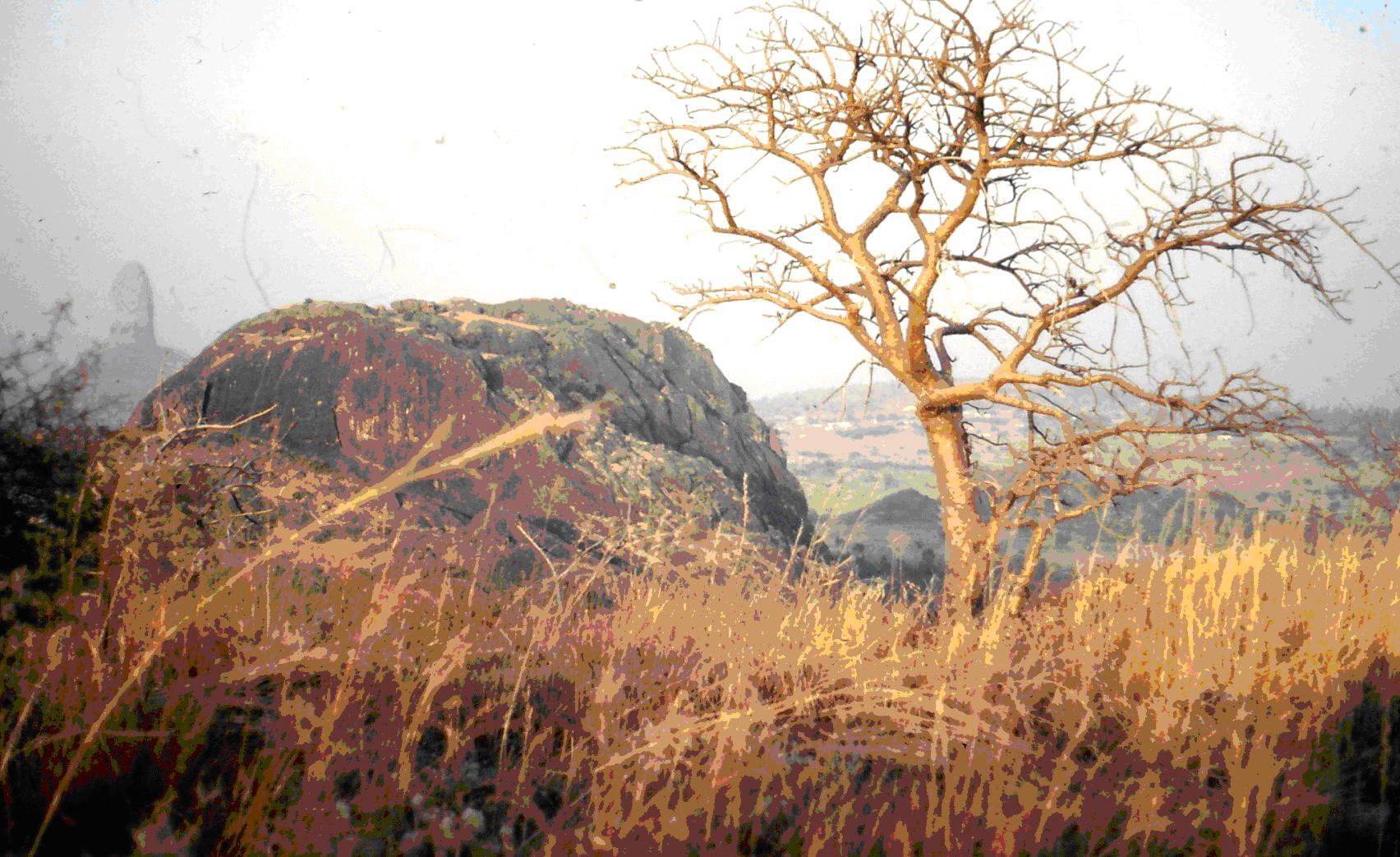
- The sacred mountain of Mogode in the country of the Kapsiki people

- Location in Cameroon
- Coordinates: 10°36′N 13°34′E
- Country: Cameroon
- Province: Far North Province

Mogode is a town and commune in North Cameroon, adjacent to the border with Nigeria.

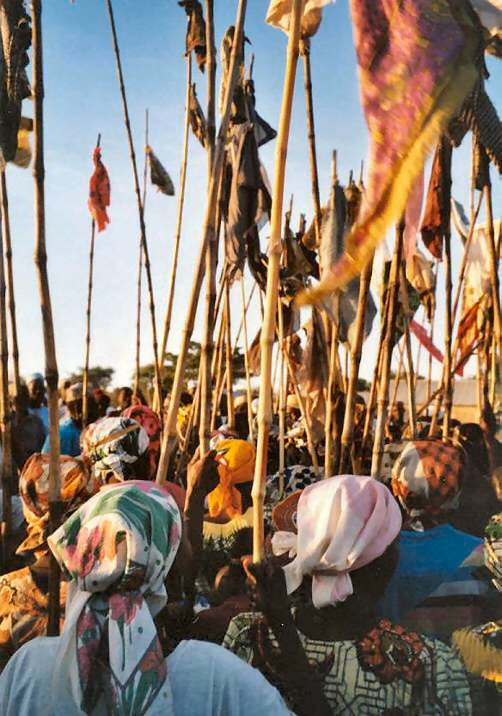
The women during the year festival in Mogode

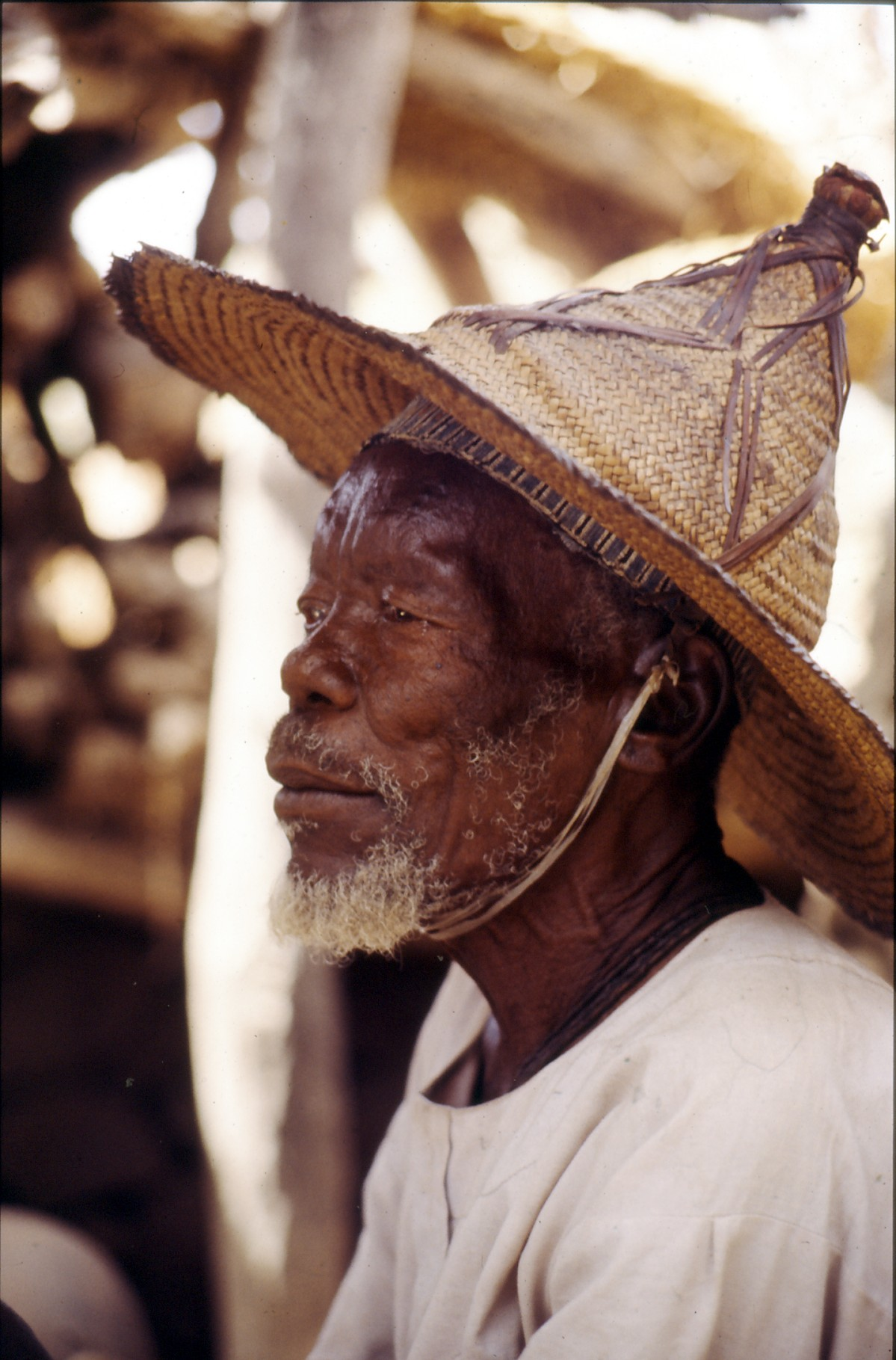
Vandu Zraté, a respected village elder of Mogode.

== See also ==
- Communes of Cameroon
