= Ghang Sukathokar =

Ghyang Sukathokar घ्याङ्गसुकाठोकर
- Village development committee
- Nickname: घ्याङ्ग
- Location in Nepal
- Coordinates: 27.56°N 86.04°E
- Country: Nepal
- Zone: Janakpur Zone
- District: Dolakha District

Population (1991)
  - Total: 4,600
- Time zone: UTC+5:45 (Nepal Time)

Ghyang Sukathokar is a village development committee (VDC) in Dolakha District in the Janakpur Zone of north-eastern Nepal. At the time of the 1991 Nepal census it had a population of 4,600.

This VDC is bordered by Sailungeswor VDC in the north and south, Vedpu in the west and the Bytamakosi River in the east.

Ghyang Sukathokar is a religiously important area and the famous Gaikhura Mahadev and Bhakure Devi Mandir temples are located there.

In Ghyang Sukathokar, people are mainly involved in agriculture and animal husbandry as well as advanced and modern occupations like teaching and office work . Mr.Keshab Bahadur Karki was elected Last VDCs Chairman with people popular votes, 1997 A.D.Ghyang Sukathokar(the previous VDC) is now a part of Melung Rural Municipality. It was a separate village development committee (VDC) from 1990 to 2017.
