= Pawati, Nepal =

Pawati पवटी
- Village development committee
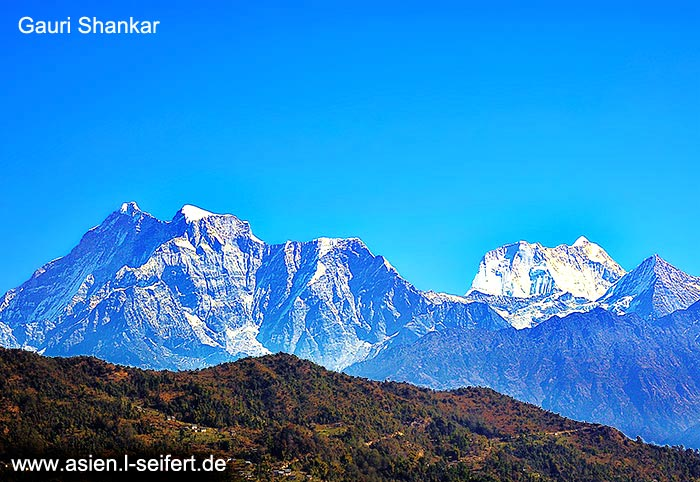
- Gauri Shankar

- Location in Nepal
- Coordinates: 27.59°N 86.07°E
- Country: Nepal
- Zone: Janakpur Zone
- District: Dolakha District

Population (1991)
  - Total: 4,346
- Time zone: UTC+5:45 (Nepal Time)

Pawati is a village development committee in Dolakha District in the Janakpur Zone of north-eastern Nepal. At the time of the 1991 Nepal census, it had a population of 4,946 people living in 857 individual households.
