= Kutin language =

Savanna language spoken in Nigeria and Cameroon

Kutin
- Peere
- Region: Cameroon
- Native speakers: (15,000 in Cameroon cited 1993) and a few in Nigeria
- Language family: Niger–Congo?: Atlantic–Congo; Leko–Nimbari; Duru; Voko–Dowayo; Vere–Dowayo; Kutin
- Dialects: Peere; Potopo; Patapori

Language codes
- ISO 639-3: pfe
- Glottolog: peer1241

Kutin is a member of the Duru branch of Savanna languages. Most Nigerian speakers moved to Cameroon when the Gashaka-Gumti National Park was established.

== Dialects ==
The dialects of Paara (Kutin) are as follows.

Paara (Páárá) is spoken in the northwestern part of Tignère commune (Faro and Deo departments, Adamaoua Region), between the aforementioned town and the Nigerian border by about 15,000 speakers.

Paara Muura, by far the most important variety, is the most northerly dialect (Mayo Baléo commune, Faro and Deo departments, Adamaoua Region), along with Gadjiwan and Aimé, northwest of Tignère.

Zongbi is spoken southeast of Tignère near Djombi, Ngaoundéré commune, Vina department, Adamaoua Region.

Dan Muura is an isolated dialect in the northeast of Banyo (Banyo commune, Mayo-Banyo department, Adamaoua Region).

Blench (2004) considers the three varieties, Peere, Potopo (Kotopo), and Patapori, to be separate languages.
