= Mayo-Baléo =

Coordinates: 7°39′N 12°20′E

- Commune and town
- Interactive map of Mayo-Baléo
- Country: Cameroon
- Region: Adamawa Region
- Time zone: UTC+1 (WAT)

Mayo-Baléo is a town and commune in Cameroon.
