= Cameroon–Nigeria border =

International border

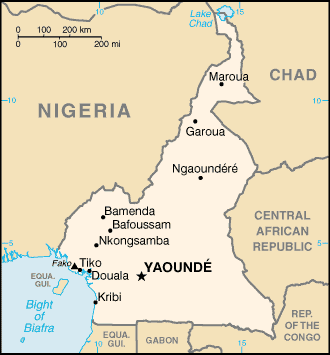
Map of Cameroon, with Nigeria to the west

The Cameroon–Nigeria border is 1,975 km (1,227 mi) in length and runs from the tripoint with Chad in the north to the Atlantic Ocean in the south.

== Description ==
The border starts in the north at the tripoint with Chad in Lake Chad, proceeding through the lake via an NW-SE straight line down to the estuary of the Ebedi river. The border follows this river as it flows to the south-east, before turning south, proceeding overland in this direction via a series of irregular lines and some small rivers (such as the Kalia). In the vicinity of the parallel 11°30 the border turns to the south-west, turning north-west at the town of Banki, and then south-west through the Mandara Mountains and Atlantika Mountains, occasionally utilising rivers such as the Mayo Tiel and Benue. At about the parallel of 6°30 the border shifts to the west, using irregular lines and rivers such as the Donga, before continuing in a south-west direction via various overland lines and rivers (such as the Cross and Akwayafe), before entering the Bight of Benin just west of the Bakassi peninsula.

== History ==
Britain had (via the Royal Niger Company) administered the area around Lagos since 1861 and the Oil River Protectorate (Calabar are the surrounding area) since 1884. As Britain expanded into the interior, two colonies were created - the Southern Nigeria Protectorate and the Northern Nigeria Protectorate. In 1900 the administration of these areas was transferred to the British government, with the Northern and Southern (including Lagos and Calabar) protectorates united as the colony of Nigeria in 1914. Meanwhile, against the backdrop of the Scramble for Africa, Germany had claimed Cameroon (Kamerun) in July 1884. The Scramble culminated in the Berlin Conference of 1884, in which the European nations concerned agreed upon their respective territorial claims and the rules of engagements going forward.

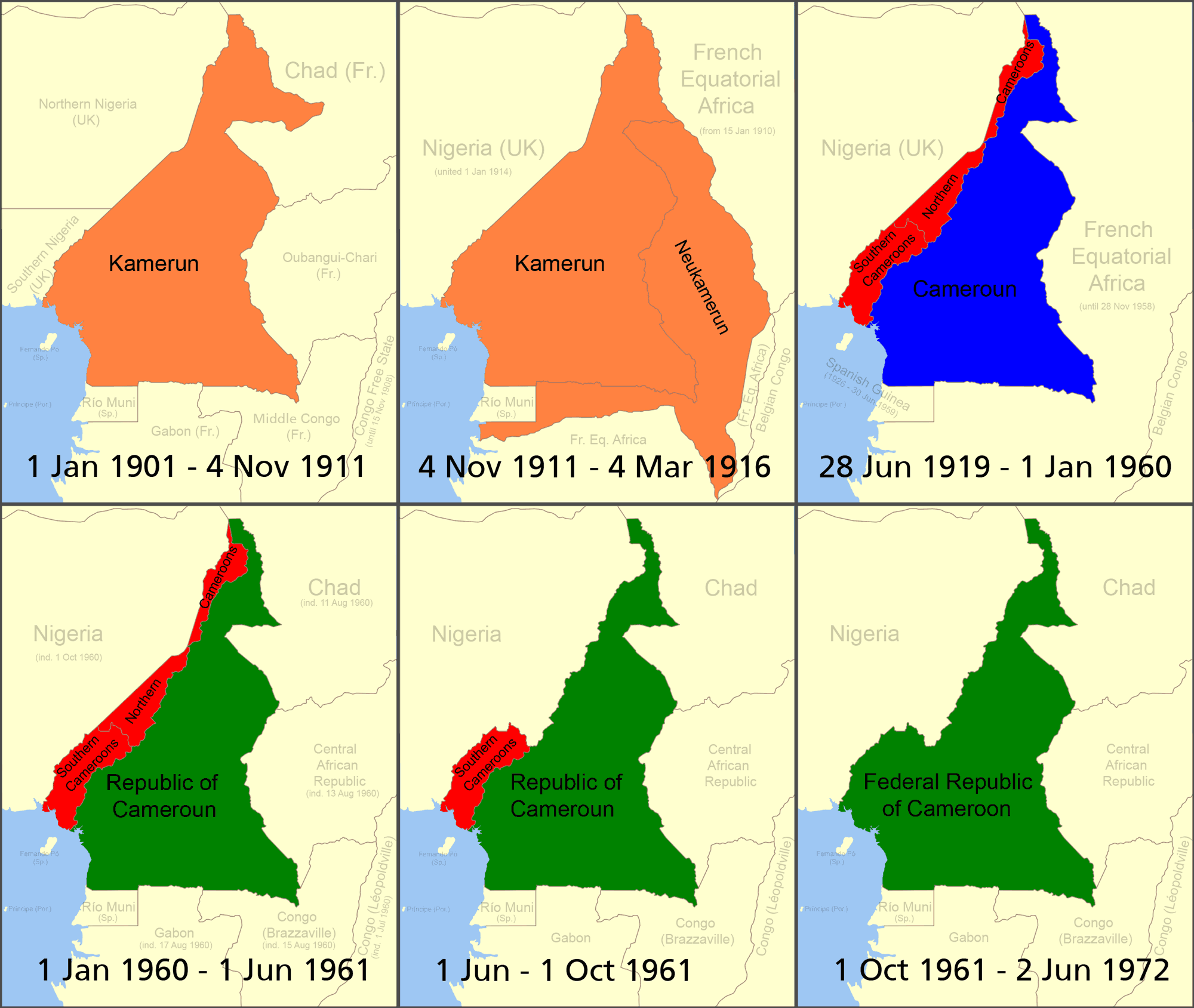
Maps of Cameroon 1901-1972 showing the changes to the border with Nigeria German Cameroon (Kamerun) British Cameroons French Cameroon (Cameroun) independent Cameroon (Cameroun)

In April–June 1885 Britain and Germany signed a treaty outlining a border in the southern areas of Nigeria and Cameroon utilising the Rio del Rey and the Cross River. The boundary was extended northwards as far as Yola in July–August 1886. Disagreements as to the location of the rivers mentioned in these treaties led to another treaty on 1 July 1890 modifying the southern section of the boundary, clarified by mutual agreement on 14 April 1893. A treaty of 15 November 1893 then extended the boundary north into Lake Chad; this section was clarified in further detail on 19 March 1906. The entire boundary was then confirmed by mutual agreement in February–March 1909 and March–April 1913.

When the First World War broke out in 1914, Britain and France invaded Cameroon and eventually defeated the Germans in 1916. on 22 July 1922, Cameroon became a League of Nations mandate, with the vast majority of the colony going to France, and smaller areas along the Nigerian border (Northern Cameroons and Southern Cameroons, the former split into two sections) in the west to Britain. A British Order in Council of 26 June 1923 stated that thenceforth the British mandated areas would be considered administratively to form part of Nigeria. The boundary between the British and French mandates was delimited in 1930 and then finalised on 9 January 1931. This mandate/trusteeship arrangement was affirmed by the UN in 1946. On 2 August that same year Britain finalised the border between Northern and Southern Cameroon, which today forms much of the Taraba State section of the border.

As the movement for decolonisation grew in the post-Second World War era, Britain and France gradually granted more political rights and representation for their African colonies. Cameroon gained full independence in January 1960, followed by Nigeria in October. In February 1961 a plebiscite was held on the future of Britain's Cameroon mandate, as a result of which Northern Cameroons voted to join Nigeria and Southern Cameroon voted to join Cameroon, thereby fixing the border at its current position.

In 1994 a long-simmering dispute over the ownership of the Bakassi peninsula was forwarded to the International Court of Justice, ruling that the territory belonged to Cameroon in 2002. Despite considerable opposition to the ruling within Nigeria, the peninsula was handed to Cameroon during the period 2006–08. Opposition within Bakassi to Cameroonian annexation has led to the Bakassi conflict, which has merged to some degree with the wider Anglophone Crisis in the country, with vocal demands for the separation of the former Southern Cameroons as Ambazonia. The far north of the border meanwhile has been heavily affected by the Boko Haram insurgency in recent years.

On June 27, 2024, Cameroon and Nigeria reach an agreement during the 20th extraordinary session of their joint commission. Nigeria agrees not to refer the matter to the International Court of Justice to resolve the last remaining disputed border points.

== Settlements near the border ==
=== Cameroon ===
- Bri
- Bodo
- Blame
- Afade
- Diba
- Limani
- Ndoughoula
- Ziguague
- Bounderi
- Banki
- Mogode
- Demsa
- Gerele
- Mbaga
- Beka
- Tchamba
- Balkosa
- Salpeo
- Dodeo
- Abong
- Tamian
- Loua
- Adere
- Abatoum
- Esengi
- Obonye
- Mbenmong

=== Nigeria ===
- Dambaru
- Ngala
- Rann
- Gilego
- Kumshe
- Backi
- Madagali
- Musuma
- Maiha
- Wuro Bokka
- Belel
- Konkul
- Gurin
- Buli
- Sampa
- Kojoli
- Tapare
- Djawe
- Kanyaka
- Mbarka Manga
- Tosso
- Lissam Sambo
- Pambo
- Okwa
- Danare
- Okuri
- Esuokon
- Ikang

== Border crossings ==
The two main crossings are at Banki (NGA)-Mora (CMR) in the north and Mfum (NGA)-Mamfe (CMR) in the south.

== See also ==
- Cameroon–Nigeria relations
