= Gaurishankar Rural Municipality =

- गौरीशंकर गाउँपालिका
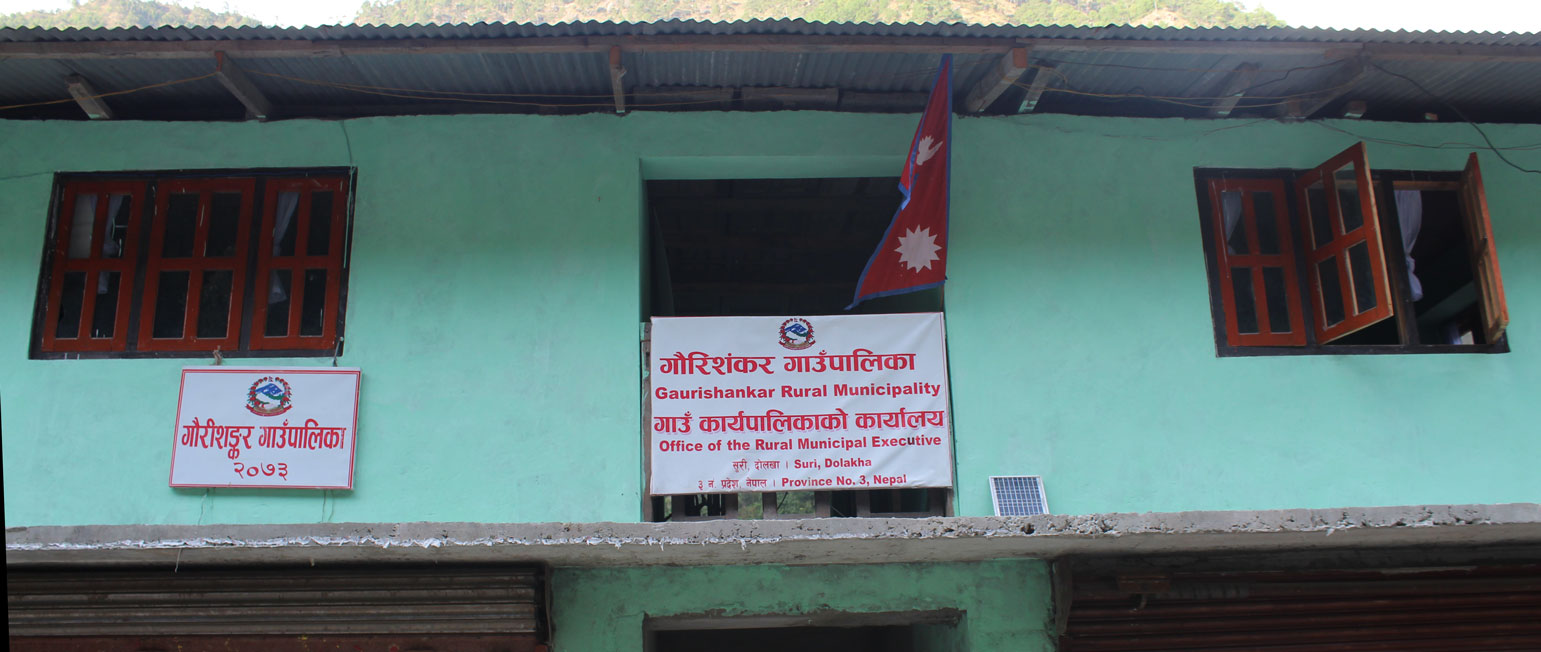
- Office of the Rural Municipality.

- Location in Nepal
- Coordinates: 27.7555116°N 86.2156601°E
- Country: Nepal
- Province: Bagmati Province
- District: Dolakha
- Headquarters: Suri, Dolakha

Area
  - Total: 681.39 km^{2} (263.09 sq mi)

Population (2011 Nepal census)
  - Total: 17,062
  - Density: 25.040/km^{2} (64.853/sq mi)
- Time zone: UTC+5:45 (Nepal Time)
- Website: http://gaurishankarmun.gov.np/

Gaurishankar (Nepali: ne:गौरीशंकर गाउँपालिका), a part of Bagmati Province, Nepal, is a rural municipality located in Dolakha District. With Suri as its current official headquarters, the rural municipality consists of nine wards (previously seven Village Development Committees) covers an area of 681.39 km^{2} and has a population of 17,062 in 2011.

It is named after Mount Gaurishankar (Nepali: ne:गौरिशंकर हिमाल), which determines Nepal time (UTC +05:45), and is also home to Tsho Rolpa Lake (also Cho Rolpa (Nepali: ne:छो-रोल्पा ताल), one of the biggest glacial lakes in Nepal.

== Demographics ==
At the time of the 2011 Nepal census, Gaurishankar Rural Municipality had a population of 17,140. Of these, 60.8% spoke Nepali, 19.2% Sherpa, 13.8% Tamang, 2.7% Jirel, 1.6% Newar, 0.7% Surel, 0.3% Magar, 0.3% Thangmi, 0.2% Gurung, 0.2% Maithili and 0.1% other languages as their first language.

In terms of ethnicity/caste, 35.4% were Chhetri, 20.2% Sherpa, 18.0% Tamang, 5.9% Kami, 4.4% Newar, 3.7% Jirel, 3.1% Gurung, 1.9% Damai/Dholi, 1.9% Magar, 1.7% Hill Brahmin, 1.2% Sarki, 1.0% Gharti/Bhujel, 0.8% Thami, 0.3% Thakuri, 0.1% other Terai and 0.4% others.

In terms of religion, 57.3% were Hindu, 38.3% Buddhism, 2.9% Prakiriti, 1.2% Christian and 0.3% others.

In terms of literacy, 56.7% could read and write, 4.7% could only read and 38.6% could neither read nor write.

== Political divisions ==
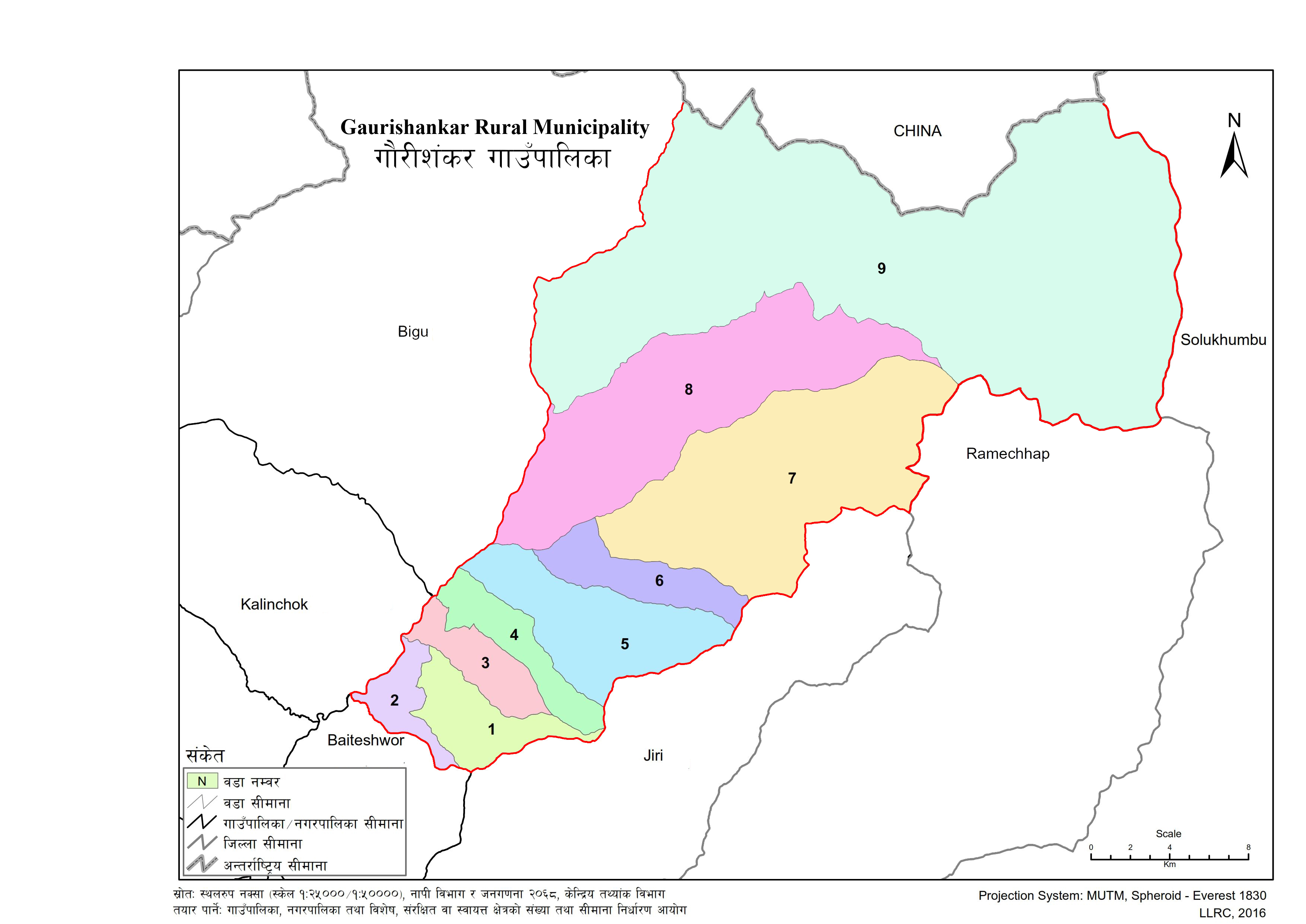
Ward division of Gaurishankar Rural Municipality, Bagmati Province

The rural municipality consists of nine wards:

- Ward No. 1 (Previously Jugu V.D.C.)
- Ward No. 2 (Previously Jugu V.D.C.)
- Ward No. 3 (Previously Jhyaku V.D.C.)
- Ward No. 4 (Previously Jhyaku V.D.C.)
- Ward No. 5 (Previously Suri V.D.C.)
- Ward No. 6 (Previously Chankhu V.D.C.)
- Ward No. 7 (Previously Marbu V.D.C.)
- Ward No. 8 (Previously Khare V.D.C.)
- Ward No. 9 (Previously Gaurishankar V.D.C.)

Ward No.	Included VDCs	Population	Area (Sq. km.)
1	Jugu (1,7-9)	1,950	21.8
2	Jugu (2–6)	1,932	12.05
3	Jhyaku (5–9)	2,395	16.5
4	Jhyaku (1–4)	2,242	19.41
5	Suri (1–9)	3,054	47.02
6	Chankhu (1–9)	1,272	21.78
7	Marbu (1–9)	1,409	114.02
8	Khare (1–9)	1,833	104.43
9	Gaurishankar (1–9)	975	324.38
	Total	17,062	681.39

== Gallery ==
Photo gallery of Gurumfi, Gaurishankar Rural Municipality.

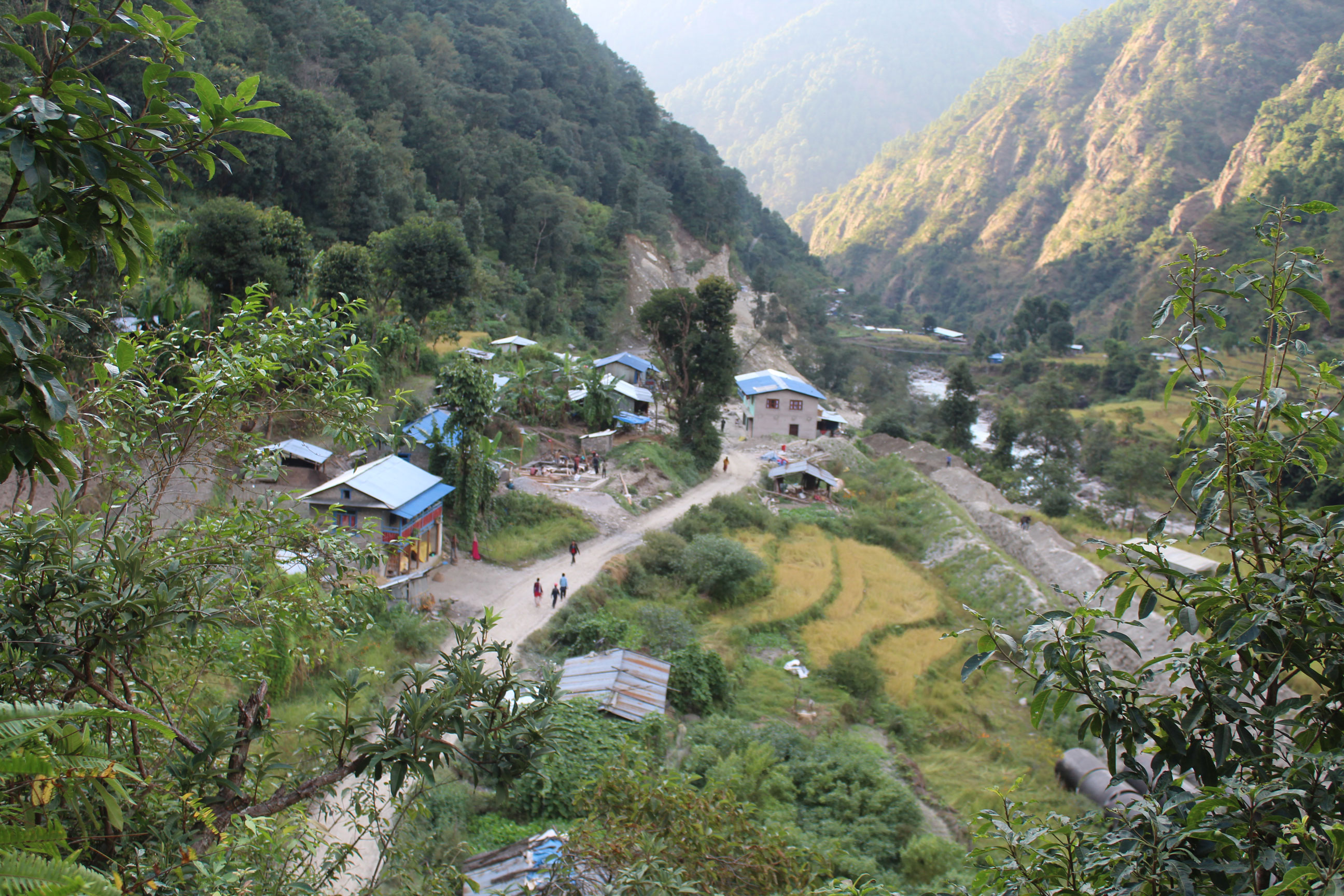
View of Gurumfi, Suri of Gaurishankar Rural Municipality, Bagmati Province, Nepal.

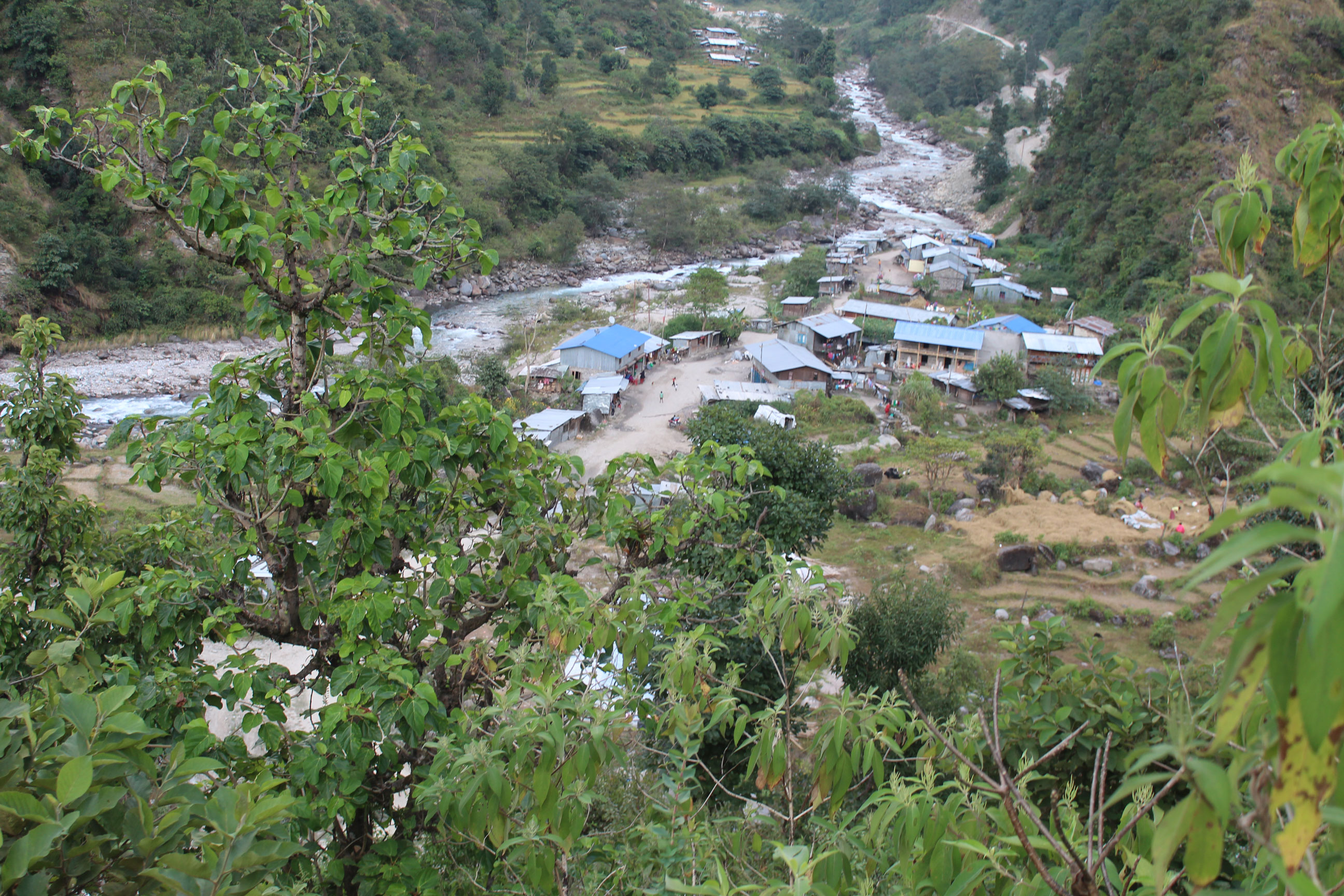
View of Gurumfi, Chankhu of Gaurishankar Rural Municipality, Bagmati Province, Nepal.

== See also ==
- Dolakha District
- Bagmati Province
- Rural municipality
- List of Rural Municipalities in Nepal
