= Khare =

Indian family name

Khare is a Hindu family surname found in India among Chitraguptavanshi Kayasthas, and takes its meaning from the word 'pure'.

== Notable people ==
- Adonna Jantina Khare (born 1980), American artist
- Aishwarya Khare (born 1995), Indian television actress
- Amit Khare (born 1961), Indian Administrative Service officer
- Ananya Khare (born 1968), Indian television and film actress
- Atul Khare (born 1959), Under-Secretary General for Operational Support UN Department of Operational Support
- Bishun Narain Khare (1933–2013), scientist who specialized in the chemistry of planetary atmospheres and of molecules relevant to biology
- Chandrashekhar Khare (born 1968), professor of mathematics at the University of California Los Angeles
- Harish Khare, Indian journalist
- Michelle Khare (born 1992), American YouTuber, television host, actress and a former professional cyclist
- Nanda Khare (1946–2022), Indian writer and civil engineer
- Narayan Bhaskar Khare (1884–1970), Indian politician and Chief Minister of Central Province (present day Madhya Pradesh)
- R. S. Khare (born 1936), socio-cultural anthropologist and a professor of anthropology at the University of Virginia
- Rohit Khare, Indian American computer scientist and entrepreneur
- Sandeep Khare (born 1973), Marathi poet, performing artist, actor and singer-songwriter
- Sonali Khare (born 1982), Indian Marathi film and television actress
- Vishnu Khare (1940–2018), Indian Hindi poet, translator, literary and film critic, journalist and scriptwriter
- Vishweshwar Nath Khare (born 1939), 33rd Chief Justice of India
