= Chandrika Prasad Jigyasu =

Indian anti-caste intellectual, writer, and publisher

Chandrika Prasad 'Jigyasu' (1880s/1890s–1974) was an Indian anti-caste intellectual, Hindi-language writer, and publisher of Dalit literature.

== Early life ==
Jigyasu was born in Lucknow, in a relatively prosperous family belonging to the Kalwar caste. He was born sometime in the late 19th century: his biography by Angney Lal states his year of birth as 1889; anthropologist Maren Bellwinkel-Schempp states it to be 1885, and Sarah Beth Wilkerson (Hunt) states it to be 1899.

His father Jiya Lal or Jijalal was well-educated and was the headmaster at the American Mission School. Jigyasu studied English and Sanskrit at school, and also began to learn Persian. However, he could not complete education beyond Class 10, after his father died when he was 11 years old.

As a young adult, Jigyasu came under the influence of the Hindu reform movement Arya Samaj. He adopted the pen name Jigyasu ("one who is curious" or "one who enquires").

At the age of 16, he wrote his first book, on Maharana Pratap, which was published by the Arya Pustakalay from Bareilly. He worked on a translation of the Bhagavad Gita from Urdu into Hindi with commentary by Swami Ramatirtha. Later, he worked as a translator and a proof-reader for several well-established Hindi journals (such as Madhuri) and publishing houses (such as Ganga Pustak Mala) in Lucknow.

== Nationalist literature ==
Inspired by the Indian independence movement, Jigyasu moved from mainstream Hindi publishing to writing nationalist pamphlets. He founded his own press, the Hindu Samaj Sudhar Karyalay (Hindu Society Reform Office).

He printed nationalist-themed booklets of songs and poems. His booklet on the Indian National Congress leader Jawahar Lal Nehru - Vir Javahar - was proscribed by the government and went through twelve editions and 450,000 copies in one year. By 1931, the Hindu Samaj Sudhar Karyalay had published over 30 titles, as part of the Hindu Social Reform Series. These included Nehru's tract Rashtriya Dhanka Athava Swadeshi Khadi (5th edition published in 1930); anti-alcoholism tracts; and various pamphlets (such as those on Congress, swadeshi, Gandhi and Motilal Nehru). Jigyasu's press was raided by the British Government five times, and he was jailed for several months for his nationalist writings.

== Adi Hindu movement ==
In 1926, Jigyasu came into contact with Swami Achutanand, a Chamar leader who had grown disillusioned with the Hindu reform of Arya Samaj, and had established the independent Adi Hindu social reform movement popular with the untouchables. Jigyasu also became increasingly influenced by the Buddhist leader Swami Bodhanand, and wrote three books with him: Mul Bharatvasi aur Arya, Bhagwan Gautam Buddha, and Bauddhacharya-paddhati. The 1930 book Mul Bharatvasi aur Arya ("The Original Inhabitants of India and the Aryans") became an important historical text of the Adi Hindu movement. Bodhanand introduced Jigyasu to the Dalit leader B.R. Ambedkar, and Jigyasu gradually became disenchanted with the efforts of the Hindu reform movement. He changed the name of his press from Hindu Samaj Sudhar Karyalay to Bahujan Kalyan Prakashan ("Bahujan Welfare Press").

== Dalit literature ==
Jigyasu wrote Bharat ke Adi-Nivasiyon ("The Original Inhabitants of India"), a history of the Dalit community in ancient India based on Adi Hindu ideology, inspired by Achutanand.

The first part of the book - Srishti aur Manav-Samaj ka Vikas ("Universe and the Development of Human Society") - was published in 1938. The second part - Bharat ke Adi-Nivasiyon ki Sabhyata ("The Civilization of the Original Inhabitants of India") was published several years later.

He wrote multiple texts on Ravidas including Sant-Pravar Ravidas Sahab (1955, "The Eminent Sant Ravidas") and Sant Ravidas ka Jivan Darshan ("The Life Philosophy of Sant Ravidas"). These books present Ravidas as an Adi Hindu poet-sant who reminds the Dalit community of its ancient heritage as indigenous inhabitants of India.

Bahujan Kalyan Prakashan published works in Hindi throughout the 1940s–1960s on various Dalit issues, including works by Ambedkar, pamphlets on Buddhism, caste discrimination and reservation.

Later, Jigyasu shifted his literary focus from historical themes of the ancient Dalit past and began to write pamphlets such as:

- Bhartiye Ripablikan Parti Hi Kyon Avashyak Hai? (Why is the Republican Party of India Necessary?), undated
- Baba Saheb ki Bhavishya Vani ("The Prophesy of Baba Saheb"), 1956
- Baba Saheb ka Jivan Sangharsh ("Baba Saheb’s Life of Struggle"), 1961
- Baba Saheb ka Updesh-Adesh (Advice of Baba Saheb), undated
- Hindi translations of Ambedkar’s books such as Who Were the Shudras? (1946), The Untouchables (1948) and Annihilation of Caste (1982)

Jigyasu mainly published small Hindi-language pamphlets by Dalit authors, including songs, poems, dramas, ideological articles, and caste histories. These pamphlets were distributed at community gatherings (including annual melas) and political events. He wrote a biography of Achutanand: Swami Achutanand 'Harihar' (1968).

In 1973, Jigyasu published the thoughts of Periyar in Hindi, under the title Periyar E.V. Ramaswamy Nayakar: vyaktitva, vichar evan samajik kranti ("Periyar E.V. Ramaswamy Nayakar: personality, thought and social revolution").

Jigyasu thus became one of the earliest Dalit writers and publishers of north India. He ran his publishing business from his house in Lucknow, from the 1930s to the mid-1960s.

== Legacy ==
R. S. Khare described him as "a reformer, thinker, and critic" and a "rare intellectual bridge who ably connected the national with the local, the ancient with the contemporary, and the profound with the popular."

He continually invested the little money he had into his publishing ventures. His son Brahmanand and grandson Avinash Kumar continued his publishing business.

== Death ==
Jigyasu died in 1975.
