= ArtPrize =

Art contest in Grand Rapids, Michigan

- Genre: Art Competition and Cultural Event
- Frequency: Annual
- Location: Grand Rapids, Michigan
- Country: United States
- Inaugurated: 2009
- Previous event: September 18, 2025–October 4, 2025
- Next event: September 17, 2026–October 3, 2026
- Controlling Entities: City of Grand Rapids, Downtown Grand Rapids Inc., and Kendall College of Art and Design of Ferris State University. Interim Executive Director: Taylor Loftus
- Filing status: 501(c)(3)
- Sponsor: https://www.artprize.org/sponsors
- Website: artprize.org

ArtPrize is an art competition and festival in Grand Rapids, Michigan. Anyone over the age of 18 can display their art, and any space within the three-square-mile ArtPrize district can be a venue. There are typically over 160 venues, including museums, galleries, bars, restaurants, hotels, public parks, bridges, laundromats, auto body shops, and more.

ArtPrize lasts for 19 days beginning in late September, and during each festival $500,000 in cash prizes are awarded based on public voting and a jury of art experts.

ArtPrize was created in 2009 by Rick DeVos, the son of Republican gubernatorial candidate Dick DeVos and United States Secretary of Education Betsy DeVos. In 2017, the festival's connection to the DeVos family's wealth and their conservative politics was criticized by artist Eric Millikin in his “Made of Money” installation, placed within ArtPrize.

In 2014, The Art Newspaper listed ArtPrize as one of the most-attended "big ticket" art events (those where visitors are often counted more than once), with ArtPrize's attendance of 440,000 being roughly one quarter of the 1.6 million who attended the Russian Imperial Costume exhibition at the State Hermitage Museum in Saint Petersburg. ArtPrize was highlighted along with Slows Bar BQ and the Frederik Meijer Gardens & Sculpture Park as one of the reasons to visit Grand Rapids in The New York Times’ "52 Places To Go in 2016."

In 2018, ArtPrize announced the Project exhibition to showcase larger works and planned to hold ArtPrize every other year, though the Project 1 event in 2019 experienced substantially fewer visitors. The twelfth ArtPrize was postponed in 2020 with officials citing the COVID-19 pandemic. The 2022 event ran from September 15 to October 2, 2022, with many visitors criticizing the smaller scale of the works on display.

== Concept ==
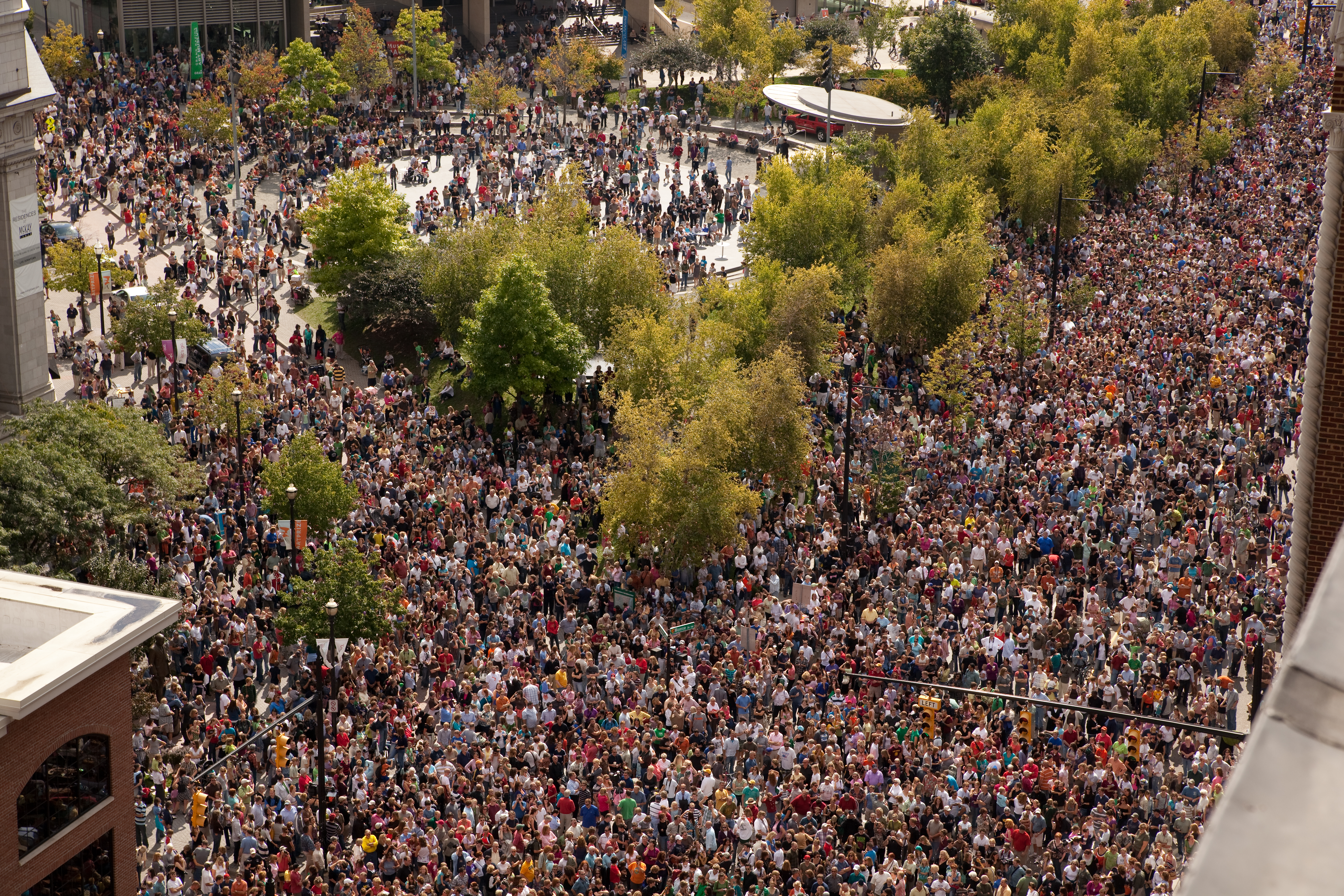
Thousands of ArtPrize visitors gather in Rosa Parks Circle in downtown Grand Rapids.

ArtPrize was conceived as an unconventional art contest with the following goals: any artist in the world could compete; anyone with property in downtown Grand Rapids could turn their space into a venue; and any visitor could vote for their favorite artwork. Event organizers would provide no selection committees or curators. And the largest cash prize in the art world would be awarded entirely by popular vote.

At the inaugural ArtPrize, held in 2009, the winners were determined solely by the public, who voted via mobile devices and the ArtPrize website. In 2010, ArtPrize added categories judged by art experts, and in 2014 restructured the awards format bringing two parallel tracks of public vote and juried awards with equal prize amounts.

== 2009 competition ==
The 2009 exhibition took place over a 3-square-mile (7.8 km^{2}) area of downtown Grand Rapids, from September 21 to October 9, 2009. 1,262 artists or artist collaboratives displayed their work in 159 venues. An estimated 200,000 attendees visited the event, with 334,219 total votes cast throughout the 19 days.

=== Participation ===
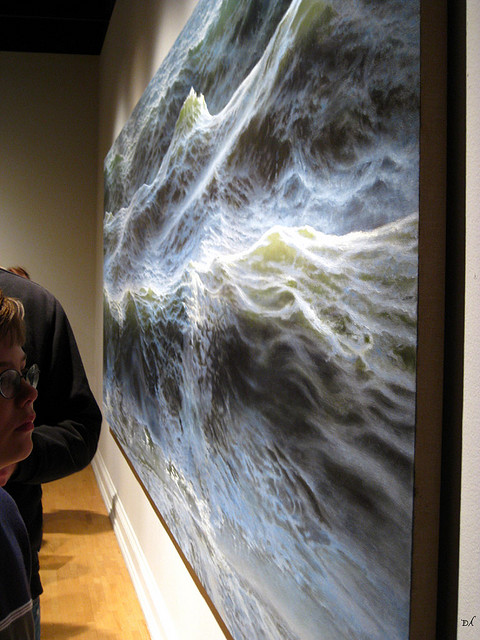
Open water no. 24 by Ran Ortner, ArtPrize 2009 Grand Prize winner

ArtPrize 2009 official participation numbers:

- 1,262 artist entries
- 159 venues
- 37,264 registered voters
- 334,219 total votes cast
- 200,000 (est.) visitors to Grand Rapids, Michigan

=== Public Vote Awards ===
The 2009 prizes, totaling to $449,000, were:

- 1st place: $250,000
- 2nd: $100,000
- 3rd: $50,000
- 4th through 10th: $7,000 each

==== Public Vote Top 10 ====
On October 1, the top 10 entries were announced, and their ranking was announced October 8:

1. Open Water no.24 – Ran Ortner (displayed at The Old Federal Building)
2. Imagine That! – Tracy Van Duinen (displayed at the Grand Rapids Children's Museum)
3. Portraits – Eric Daigh (displayed at The Old Federal Building)
4. The Grand Dance – David Lubbers (displayed on the Grand River near the Blue Bridge)
5. Moose – Bill Secunda (displayed at The B.O.B.)
6. Nessie on the Grand – The Nessie Project (displayed on the Grand River near the Blue Bridge)
7. Field of Reeds – John Douglas Powers (displayed at The Old Federal Building)
8. The Furniture City Sets the Table for the World of Art – Sarah Grant (displayed on the Blue Bridge)
9. Ecstasy of The Scarlet Empress – Jason Hackenwerth (displayed at the Urban Institute for Contemporary Arts (UICA))
10. winddancer 2 – Michael Westra (displayed on the Blue Bridge)

=== Surprise Awards ===
Two previously unannounced awards were handed out:

- Curators Choice Award ($5000): salt & earth – Young Kim, Winston-Salem, N.C.
- Sustainability Award ($2500): The Image Mill: Sustainable Cinema #1 by Scott Hessels

== 2010 competition ==
The 2010 event took place from September 22 to October 10. The event introduced "Exhibition Centers," local cultural institutions featuring professional curation. Each ArtPrize Exhibition Center was required to host voter registration/activation as well as a retail presence. ArtPrize sought to have at least one Exhibition Center in each downtown Grand Rapids neighborhood.

=== Participation ===
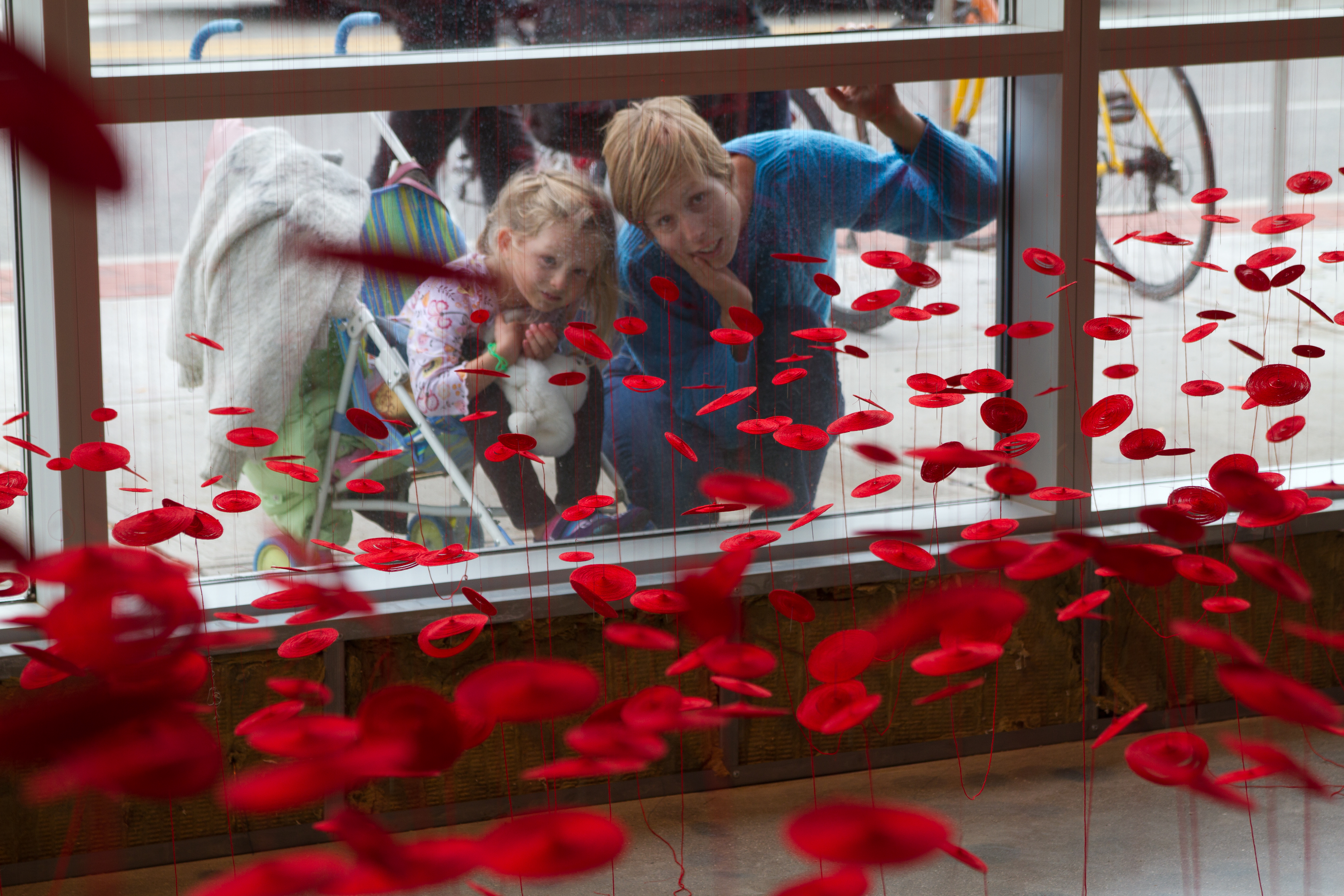
Lure / Wave Grand Rapids by Beili Liu

ArtPrize 2010 official participation numbers:

- 1,713 artist entries
- 193 venues
- 21 countries and 44 U.S. states
- 44,912 registered voters
- 465,538 votes cast
- 250,000 (est.) visitors to Grand Rapids, Michigan

=== Public Vote Awards ===
The 2010 prizes, which were decided by public vote, totaled $449,000 were:

- 1st place: $250,000
- 2nd: $100,000
- 3rd: $50,000
- 4th through 10th: $7,000 each

==== Public Vote Top 10 ====
On September 30, the 2010 Top 10 entries were announced, and their rankings were revealed during the Winners Announcement on October 7:

1. Cavalry, American Officers, 1921 – Chris LaPorte, Grand Rapids, Michigan
2. Svelata – Mia Tavonatti, Santa Ana, California
3. Lure/Wave, Grand Rapids – Beili Liu, Austin, Texas
4. A Matter Of Time – Paul Baliker, Palm Coast, Florida
5. Vision – David Spriggs, Montreal, Quebec, Canada
6. Helping mom one penny at a time – Wander Martich, Grand Rapids, Michigan
7. Dancing With Lions – Bill Secunda, Butler, Pennsylvania
8. salt & earth (garden for Patricia) – Young Kim, Winston-Salem, North Carolina
9. SteamPig – The Steam Pig Experiment Birks, Jensen, Grand Rapids, Michigan
10. Elephant Walk – Fredrick Prescott, Santa Fe, New Mexico

=== Juried Awards ===
Event organizers announced the addition of four juried awards for ArtPrize 2010. Event organizers noted that, depending on sponsor availability, more juried awards might be added to the program.

==== Categories and winners ====
- Two-Dimensional: Garden Party, Chez Hatfield – Andrew Lewis Doak and Adrian Clark Hatfield, Royal Oak, Michigan
- Three-Dimensional: XLoungeSeries – Mark Wentzel, Atlanta, Georgia
- Time/Performance: The Jettisoned – Yoni Goldstein, Chicago, Illinois
- Urban Space: Plan B – Rick Beerhorst and Rose Beerhorst, Andre Beaumont and Mike Hoyte, Grand Rapids, Michigan
- International: Evaporative Buildings – Alex Schweder La, Berlin, Germany / New York, New York
- Sustainability: A Matter Of Time – Paul Baliker, Palm Coast, Florida

==== Jurors ====
Award	Juror	Title
Two-Dimensional Work	Patricia Phillips	Dean of Graduate Studies for the Rhode Island School of Design (RISD)
Three-Dimensional Work	Xenia Kalpaktsoglou	Curator and co-director of the Athens Biennale
Time/Performance-Based Work	Judith Barry	Director of the MFA program at the Art Institute of Boston
Use of Urban Space	Jeff Speck	city planner, architectural designer, author and former Director of Design at the National Endowment for the Arts

== 2011 competition ==
The 2011 event ran from September 21 to October 9. The biggest change to the competition was the addition of an exhibition center dedicated to performance art—St. Cecilia Music Society. The organization was also the recipient of a $100,000 Our Town grant from the National Endowment for the Arts.

=== Participation ===
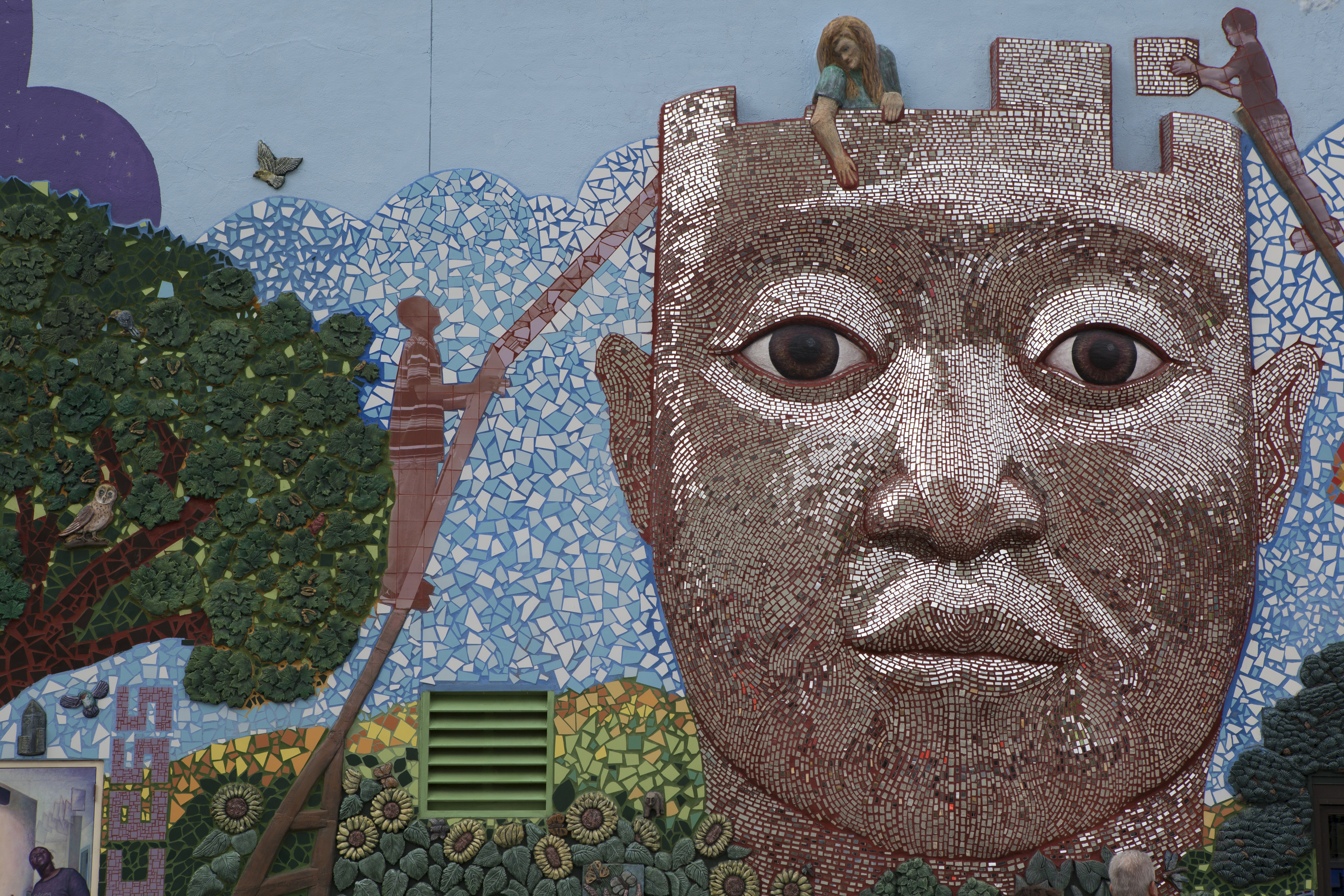
The Metaphorist Project by Tracey Van Duinen

ArtPrize 2011 official participation numbers:

- 1,582 artist entries
- 164 venues
- 39 countries and 43 U.S. states
- 38,811 registered voters
- 383,106 votes placed
- 322,000 visitors to Grand Rapids, Michigan

=== Public Vote Awards ===
The 2011 prizes, which were decided by public vote, totaled $449,000, were:

- 1st place: $250,000
- 2nd: $100,000
- 3rd: $50,000
- 4th through 10th: $7,000 each

==== Public Vote Top 10 ====
On September 30, the 2010 Top 10 entries were announced, and their rankings were revealed during the Winners Announcement on October 6:

1. Crucifixion – Mia Tavonatti, Santa Ana, California
2. The Metaphorist Project – Tracy Van Duinen, Chicago, Illinois
3. Rain – Lynda Cole, Ann Arbor, Michigan
4. President Gerald Ford Visits ArtPrize – Sunti Pichetchaiyakul, Thailand and Montana
5. Rusty: A Sense of Direction/Self Portrait – Ritch Branstrom, Rapid River, Michigan
6. Grizzlies on the Ford – Llew “Doc” Tilma, Wayland, Michigan
7. The Tempest II – Laura Alexander, Columbus, Ohio
8. Ocean Exodus – Paul Baliker, Palm Coast, Florida
9. Under Construction – Robert Shangle, Grand Rapids, Michigan
10. Mantis Dreaming" – Bill Secunda, Butler, Pennsylvania

=== Juried Awards ===
In addition to awards determined by public vote, the organization presented seven juried awards at ArtPrize 2011. An award dedicated to an outstanding venue was added in 2011. Each juried award winner received $7,000.

==== Categories and winners ====
- Two-Dimensional: One Ordinary Day of an Ordinary Town – Mimi Kato, St. Louis, Missouri
- Three-Dimensional: Nature Preserve – Michelle Brody, New York, New York
- Time/Performance: Remember:Replay:Repeat – Caroline Young, Chicago, Illinois
- Urban Space: Salvaged Landscape – Catie Newell, Detroit, Michigan
- International: DISAPPEARANCES – an eternal journey – Shinji Turner-Yamamoto, Cincinnati, Ohio
- Venue: SiTE:LAB – Curator: Paul Amenta, Grand Rapids, Michigan
- Sustainability: Walking Home: stories from the desert to the Great Lakes – Laura Milkins, Tucson, Arizona
- Ox-Bow Residency: Progressive Movement(s) – Evertt Beidler, Portland, Oregon

==== Jurors ====
Award	Juror	Title
Two-Dimensional Work	Anne Ellegood	Senior Curator, Hammer Museum in Los Angeles, California
Three-Dimensional Work	Glenn Harper	Editor-in-Chief, Sculpture magazine
Time/Performance-Based Work	Kathleen Forde	Curator of Time-Based Arts at the Experimental Media and Performing Arts Center (EMPAC) in Troy, N.Y.
Use of Urban Space	Reed Kroloff	Director of the Cranbrook Academy of Art and Art Museum
International Award	Nuit Banai	Art historian and critic, Tufts University
Sustainability Award	Susan Lyons	Principal of Susan Lyons Designs
Outstanding Venue	Reed Kroloff	Director of the Cranbrook Academy of Art and Art Museum

== 2012 competition ==
The 2012 ArtPrize competition ran from September 19 to October 7. The event introduced new changes to the ArtPrize Juried Awards program, including category prizes valued at $20,000 (up from $7,000) and a first-ever $100,000 Juried Grand Prize, decided by a panel of three art experts.

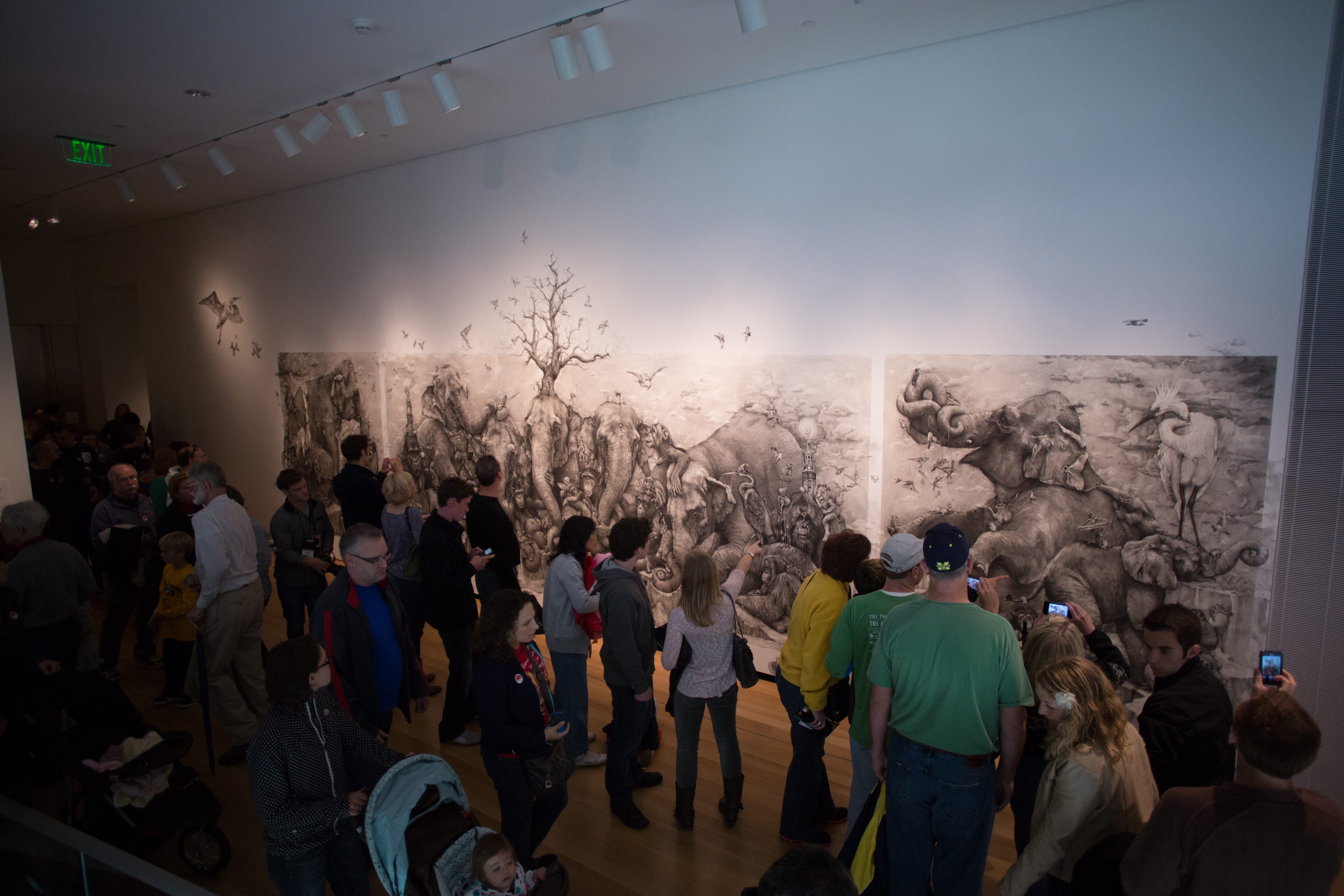
Elephants by Adonna Khare, ArtPrize 2012 Public Vote Grand Prize Winner

=== Participation ===
ArtPrize 2012 official participation numbers:

- 1,517 artist entries
- 161 venues
- 46 countries, 41 U.S. states and territories
- 47,160 voters
- 412,560 votes placed
- 375,000 (est.) visitors to Grand Rapids in 19 days

=== Public Vote Awards ===
The 2012 prizes, which were decided by public vote, totaled $360,000 were:

- 1st place: $200,000
- 2nd: $75,000
- 3rd: $50,000
- 4th through 10th: $5,000 each

==== Public Vote Top 10 ====
The top 10 entries were determined by a record 412,560 votes, and announced on October 10.

1. Elephants – Adonna Khare, Burbank, Calif.
2. Song of Lift – Martijn van Wagtendonk, Colbert, Ga.
3. Rebirth of Spring – Frits Hoendervanger, Detroit, Mich.
4. Stick-to-it-ive-ness: Unwavering pertinacity; perseverance – Richard Morse, Fennville, Mich.
5. Lights in the Night – Mark Carpenter and Dan Johnson, Grand Rapids, Mich.
6. Life in Wood – Dan Heffron, Traverse City, Mich.
7. Origami – Kumi Yamashita, Brooklyn, N.Y.
8. The Chase – Artistry of Wildlife, Marlette, Mich.
9. Return to Eden – Sandra Bryant, Lynden, Wa.
10. City Band – Chris LaPorte, Grand Rapids, Mich.

=== Juried Awards ===
In addition to awards determined by public vote, the organization awarded seven juried awards totaling $200,000 during ArtPrize 2012 across five categories and a juried grand prize. Each category winner received $20,000. The Juried Grand Prize winner was awarded $100,000. The award was decided by a three-member jury panel.

==== Juried Grand Prize winner ====
- Displacement (13208 Klinger St.) – Design 99, Detroit, Mich

==== Category Award winners ====
- Two-Dimensional: Habitat – Alois Kronschlaeger, Brooklyn, N.Y.
- Three-Dimensional: More or Less – ABCD 83, Chicago, Ill.
- Time/Performance: Three Phases – Complex Movements, Detroit, Mich.
- Urban Space: Flight – Dale Rogers, Haverhill, Ma.
- Venue: SiTE:LAB – Curator: Paul Amenta, Grand Rapids, Mich.
- Ox-Bow Residency: Collective Cover Project – Ann Morton, Phoenix, Ariz.

==== Jurors ====
Award	Juror	Title
Juried Grand Prize	Jerry Saltz	Senior Art Critic, New York Magazine
	Tom Eccles	Director, the Center for Curatorial Studies, Bard College
	Theaster Gates	Chicago-based artist and community activist
Two-Dimensional Work	Tyler Green	Editor, Modern Art Notes; Columnist, Modern Painters
Three-Dimensional Work	Lisa Frieman	Chair, contemporary department, Indianapolis Museum of Art
Time/Performance-Based Work	Cathy Edwards	Director of Performance Programs, the International Festival of Arts & Ideas
Use of Urban Space	Susan Szenasy	Editor-in-Chief, Metropolis magazine

== 2013 competition ==
The 2013 ArtPrize competition ran from September 18 to October 6.

=== Participation ===
ArtPrize 2013 official participation numbers:

- 1,805 artist entries
- 169 venues
- 47 countries and 45 U.S. states and territories
- 49,000 voters
- 446,850 votes cast
- 400,000 (est.) visitors to Grand Rapids, Michigan

=== Public Vote Awards ===
The 2013 prizes, which were decided by public vote, totaled $360,000, were:

- 1st place: $200,000
- 2nd: $75,000
- 3rd: $50,000
- 4th through 10th: $5,000 each

==== Public Vote Top 10 ====
The top 10 entries were determined by a record 446,850 votes, and announced on October 4.

1. Sleeping Bear Dune Lakeshore – Ann Loveless, Frankfort, Mich.
2. Polar Expressed – Anni Crouter, Flint, Mich.
3. UPlifting – Andy Sacksteder, Port Clinton, Ohio
4. Dancing With Mother Nature – Paul Baliker, Palm Coast, Fla.
5. Botanical Exotica a Monumental Collection of the Rare beautiful – Jason Gamrath, Seattle, Wash.
6. Earth Giant – Benjamin Gazsi, Morgantown, W.V.
7. Myth-or-Logic – Robin Protz, New Hartford, Conn.
8. Finding Beauty in Bad Things: Porcelain Vine – Fraser Smith, St Pete Beach, Fla.
9. Taking Flight – Michael Gard, San Francisco, Calif.
10. Tired Pandas – Nick Jakubiak, Battle Creek, Mich.

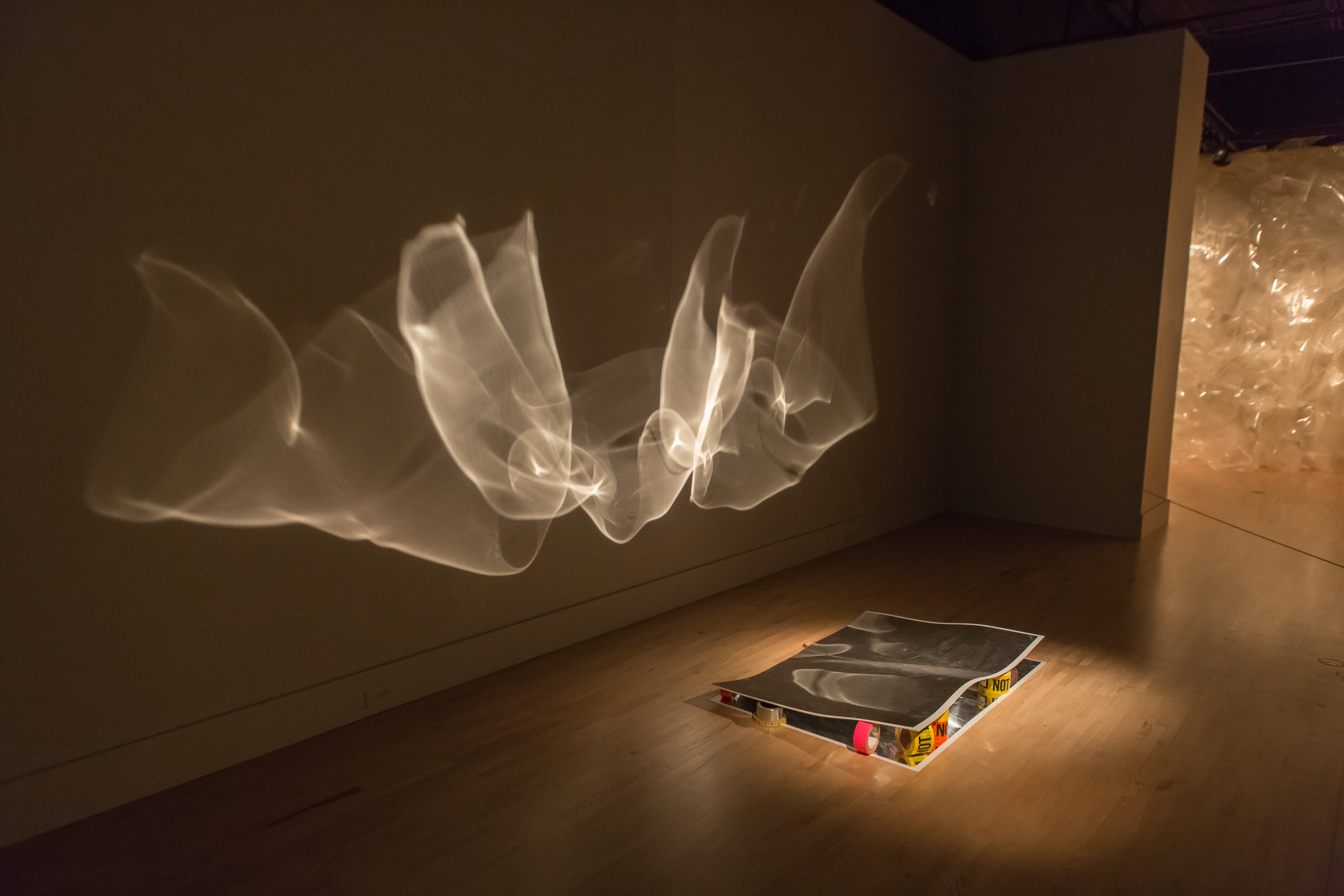
The world's an untranslatable language II (for Charles Wright) by Charles Matson Lume, nominated to the Juried Award shortlist for Three-Dimensional work

=== Juried awards ===
In addition to awards determined by public vote, the organization awarded seven juried awards totaling $200,000 during ArtPrize 2013 across five categories and a juried grand prize. Each category winner received $20,000. The Juried Grand Prize winner was awarded $100,000. The award was decided by a three-member jury panel.

==== Juried Grand Prize winner ====
- Ecosystem – Carlos Bunga, Barcelona, Spain

==== Category Winners ====
- Two-Dimensional: Europa and the Flying Fish – Kyle Staver, New York, N.Y.
- Three-Dimensional: Through the Skies for You – Kevin Cooley / Phillip Andrew Lewis, Chattanooga, Tenn.
- Time/Performance: The Last Post – Shahzia Sikander, New York, N.Y.
- Urban Space: united.states : an everydaypeople project – J.D. Urban, Brooklyn, N.Y.
- Venue: The Fed Galleries @ KCAD, Kendall College of Art and Design – Curator: Michele Bosak, Grand Rapids, Mich.
- Ox-Bow Residency: Erase – Greg Bokor, Beverly, Mass.

==== Jurors ====
Award	Juror	Title
Juried Grand Prize	Anne Pasternak	President and artistic director of Creative Time, New York, N.Y.
	Manon Slome	President and chief curator of No Longer Empty, New York, N.Y.
	Mel Chin	Artist and activist
Two-Dimensional Work	John Yau	Editor of Hyperallergic Weekend
Three-Dimensional Work	Hesse McGraw	Vice president for exhibitions and public programs at the San Francisco Art Institute
Time/Performance-Based Work	Rashida Bumbray	independent curator in New York, N.Y.
Urban Space	Eva Franch i Gilabert	Executive director and curator of the Storefront for Art and Architecture
Venue	Alice Gray Stites	Chief curator of 21c Museum

=== Controversy ===
David Dodde's Fleurs et riviere was an entry that placed magnetic flowers on the Alexander Calder sculpture La Grande Vitesse. After getting complaints, the City of Grand Rapids contacted the Calder Foundation to get their input. Calder's grandson, Alexander S. C. Rower, replied: "The initiative is luckily temporary and reflects an utter lack of understanding and respect of Calder's genius." The city decided to have the flowers removed before the end of the exhibition.

== 2014 competition ==
The 2014 ArtPrize competition ran from September 24 to October 12.

=== Participation ===
ArtPrize 2014 official participation numbers:

- 1,536 artist entries
- 174 venues
- 41,956 voters
- 398,714 votes placed
- 441,000+ (est.) visitors to Grand Rapids, Michigan

=== Public Vote Awards ===
The public vote determined three $20,000 category winners and a $200,000 grand prize winner. The grand prize winner does not receive $20,000 for their category win.

==== Public Vote Grand Prize winner ====
- Intersections – Anila Quayyum Agha, Indianapolis, Indiana

==== Category Award winners ====
- Two-Dimensional: Outcry – Gretchyn Lauer, Grand Rapids, Michigan
- Three-Dimensional: Reciprocity – Marc Sijan, Milwaukee, Wisconsin
- Time-Based: Your Move? – Robert Shangle, Sparta, Michigan
- Installation: Intersections – Anila Quayyum Agha, Indianapolis, Indiana

=== Juried Awards ===
The jury awarded five $20,000 category winners and a $200,000 grand prize winner. There was a tie for the grand prize, so each winner received $100,000.

==== Juried Grand Prize winners ====
A first in ArtPrize history, the Grand Prize Jury recognized two outstanding works—splitting the $200,000 Juried Grand Prize.

- Intersections – Anila Quayyum Agha, Indianapolis, Indiana
- The Hair Craft Project – Sonya Clark, Richmond, Virginia

This is also the first time the opinions of both the voting public and the jury of art experts converged, awarding a top prize to one piece – Intersections by Anila Quayyum Agha.

==== Category Award winners ====
- Two-Dimensional: The Hair Craft Project – Sonya Clark, Richmond, Virginia
- Three-Dimensional: Tengo Hambre – Maximo Gonzalez, Mexico City, Mexico
- Time-Based: respirador (breather) – Dance in the Annex, Grand Rapids, Michigan
- Installation: Symptomatic Constant – Julie Schenkelberg, Brooklyn, New York
- Outstanding venue: SiTE:LAB @ The Morton, – Curator: Paul Amenta, Grand Rapids, Michigan

==== Jurors ====
Award	Juror	Title
Juried Grand Prize	Susan Sollins	Executive director of Art21
	Leonardo Drew	Artist
	Katharina Grosse	Artist
Two-Dimensional	Andrew Russeth	
Three-Dimensional	Shamim Momin	
Time-Based	Hrag Vartanian	
Installation	Ariel Saldivar	
Outstanding venue	Tumelo Mosaka	

== 2015 competition ==
The 2015 ArtPrize (also known as ArtPrize Seven) competition ran from September 23 to October 11.

=== Participation ===
ArtPrize 2015 official participation numbers:

- 1,649 artist entries
- 162 venues
- 35,481 registered voters
- 422,763 votes cast
- 438,000+ (est.) visitors to Grand Rapids, Michigan

=== Public Vote Awards ===
The public vote determined three $12,500 category winners and a $200,000 grand prize winner. The grand prize winner does not receive $12,500 for their category win.

==== Public Vote Grand Prize winner ====
- Northwood Awakening – Loveless Photofiber, Frankfort, Michigan

==== Category Award winners ====
- Two-Dimensional: Northwood Awakening – Loveless Photofiber, Frankfort, Michigan
- Three-Dimensional: Greatest Generation/Beta Team/November – Fred Cogelow, Wilmar, Minnesota
- Time-Based: Whisper – Emily Kennerk, Zionsville, Indiana
- Installation: REACH and SPLASH – Andy Sacksteder, Gladstone, Michigan

=== Juried Awards ===
The jury awarded five $12,500 category winners and a $200,000 grand prize winner.

==== Juried Grand Prize winner ====
- Higher Ground – Kate Gilmore, Queens, New York

==== Category Award winners ====
The category winners were:

- Two-Dimensional: The Fearless Brother Project Presents – Monroe O'Bryant, Kentwood, Michigan
- Three-Dimensional: The Last Supper – Julie Green, Corvallis, Oregon
- Time-Based: That Was Then – Prince Thomas, Houston, Texas
- Installation: In Our Element – Ruben Ubiera, Miami, Florida
- Outstanding venue: SiTE:LAB @ The Rumsey Street Project, – Curator: Paul Amenta, Grand Rapids, Michigan

== 2016 Competition ==
The 2016 ArtPrize competition, also known as ArtPrize Eight, took place from September 21 to October 9.

=== Participation ===
- 1,453 artist entries
- 170 venues
- 37,433 registered voters
- 380,119 votes cast
- 507,000+ (est.) visitors to Grand Rapids, Michigan

=== Public Vote Awards ===
The public vote determined three $12,500 category winners and a $200,000 grand prize winner. The grand prize winner does not receive $12,500 for their category win.

==== Public Vote Grand Prize Winner ====
Wounded Warrior Dogs – James Mellick, Milford Center, Ohio

==== Category Award Winners ====
- Two-Dimensional: Portraits of Light and Shadow - Joao Paulo Goncalves, Pompano Beach, Florida
- Three-Dimensional: Wounded Warrior Dogs - James Mellick, Milford Center, Ohio
- Installation: The Butterfly Effect - Allison Leigh Smith and Bryce Pettit, Durango, Colorado
- Time-Based: Sweeper's Clock - Maarten Baas, Den Bosch, North Brabant, Netherlands

=== Juried Awards ===
The jury awarded five $12,500 category winners and a $200,000 grand prize winner.

==== Juried Grand Prize Winner ====
The Bureau of Personal Belonging – Stacey Kirby, Durham, North Carolina

==== Category Award Winners ====
- Two-Dimensional: les bêtes - Isaac Aoki, Grand Rapids, Michigan
- Three-Dimensional: Excavations - William Lamson, New York, New York
- Installation: This Space is Not Abandoned - 912 CollABORATIVE, Grand Rapids, Michigan
- Time-Based: Search Engine Vision “ISIS” - Eric Souther, Mishawaka, Indiana
- Outstanding Venue: Split between EVERYTHING IS TRANSFORMED, SiTE:LAB / Rumsey St. Project and This Space is Not Abandoned, 912 Grandville Avenue.

==== Jurors ====
The ArtPrize Eight jurors included:

Award	Juror	Title
Juried Grand Prize	Michelle Grabner	Artist and professor at School of the Art Institute of Chicago
	Paul Ha	Director at the MIT List Visual Arts Center
	Eric Shiner	Senior Vice President at Sotheby's
Two-Dimensional	Tina Rivers Ryan	New York-based art historian and critic
Three-Dimensional	Omar Lopez-Chahoud	Artistic Director and Curator of UNTITLED Art Fair, Miami Beach and San Francisco
Installation	Deana Haggag	Director of The Contemporary in Baltimore, Maryland
Time-Based	Yesomi Umolu	Exhibitions Curator at the Reva and David Logan Center for the Arts at the University of Chicago
Outstanding Venue	Steve Dietz	Founder, President, and artistic director of Northern Lights.mn in Minneapolis

== 2017 Competition ==
The 2017 ArtPrize competition, also known as ArtPrize Nine, took place from September 20 to October 8.

=== Participation ===
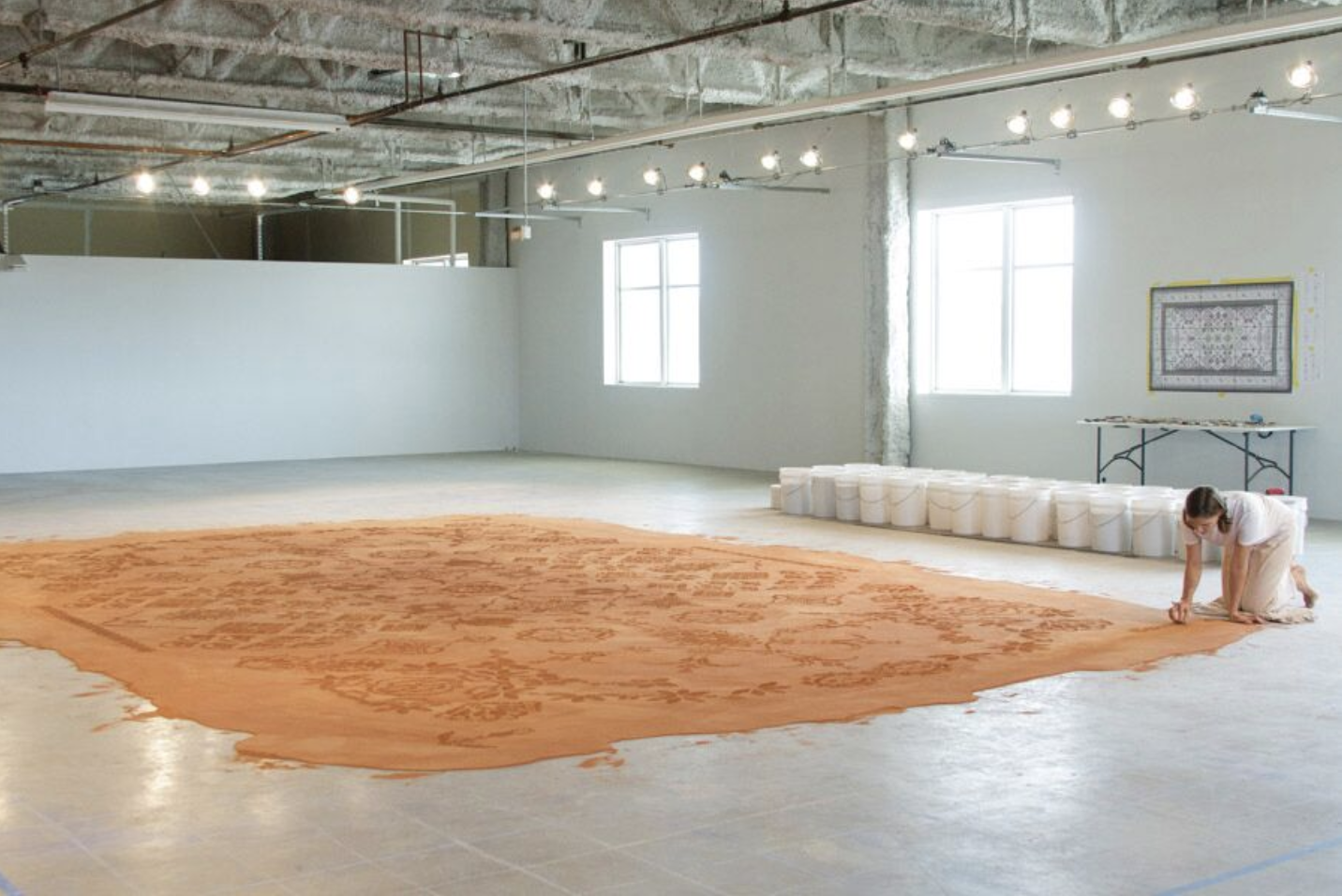
- 'Red Dirt Rug Monument' by Rena Detrixhe
  1,346 artist entries
- 175 venues
- 43,010 registered voters
- 384,053 votes cast
- 522,000+ (est.) visitors to Grand Rapids, Michigan

=== Public Vote Awards ===
The public vote determined three $12,500 category winners and a $200,000 grand prize winner. The grand prize winner does not receive $12,500 for their category win.

==== Public Vote Grand Prize Winner ====
A. Lincoln – Richard Schlatter, Battle Creek, Michigan

==== Category Award Winners ====
- Two-Dimensional: A. Lincoln - Richard Schlatter, Battle Creek, Michigan
- Three-Dimensional: Lux Maximus Fused Glass, Copper, Bronze and Metal - Daniel Oropeza, Costa Mesa, California
- Installation: Oil + Water - Ryan Spencer Reed, Ludington, Michigan; Richard App, Grand Rapids, Michigan
- Time-Based: Red Dirt Rug Monument - Rena Detrixe, Tulsa, Oklahoma

=== Juried Awards ===
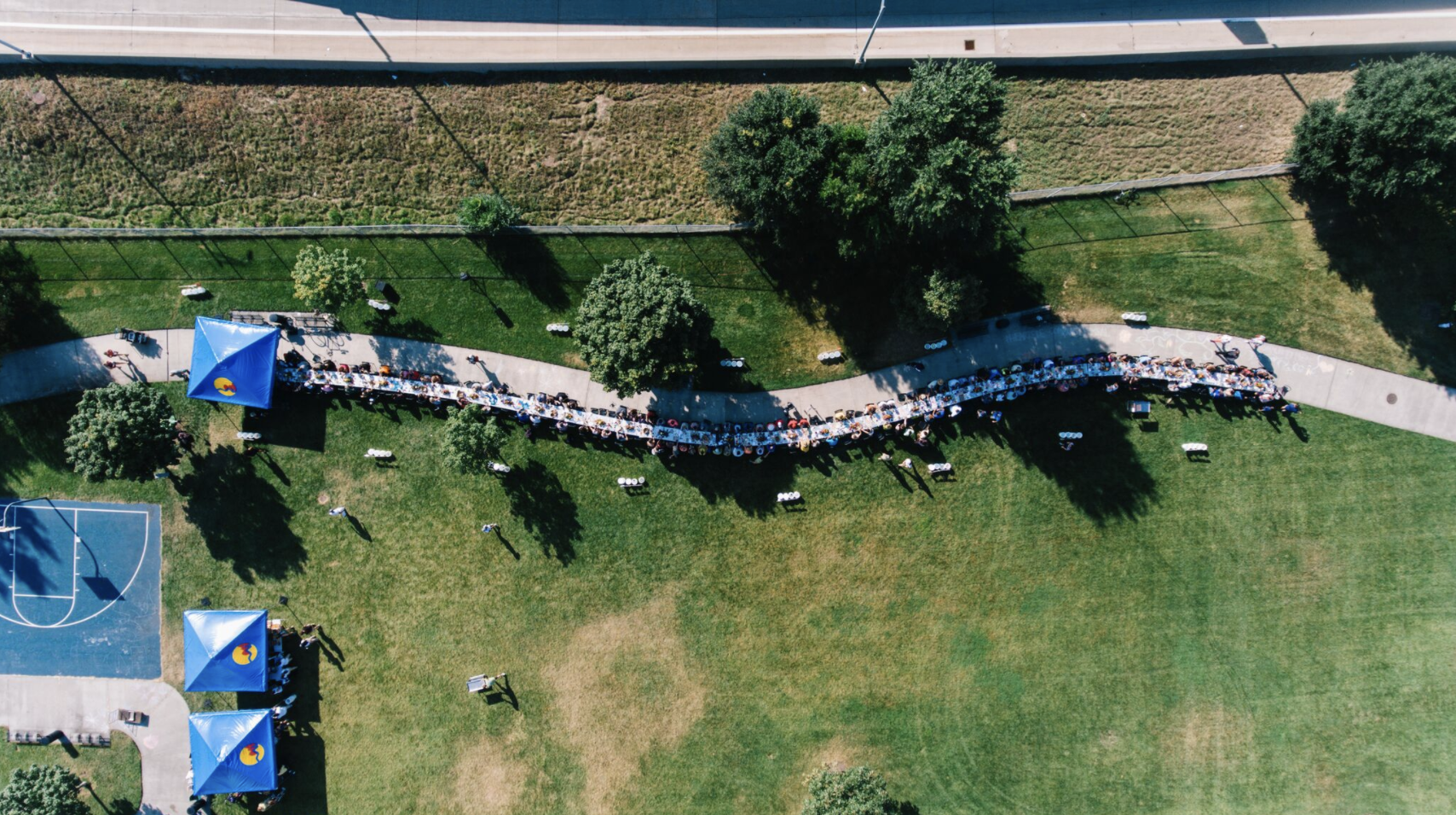
'Heartside Community Meal' by Seitu Jones

The jury awarded five $12,500 category winners and a $200,000 grand prize winner.

==== Juried Grand Prize Winner ====
The Heartside Community Meal – Seitu Jones, St. Paul, Minnesota

==== Category Award Winners ====
- Two-Dimensional: Sofía Draws Every Day: Years 2, 3, and 4 - Sofía Ramírez Hernández, Grand Rapids, Michigan
- Three-Dimensional: Flint - Ti-Rock Moore, New Orleans, Louisiana
- Installation: Society of 23's Locker Dressing Room - Jeffrey Augustine Songco, Grand Rapids, Michigan
- Time-Based: Red Dirt Rug Monument - Rena Detrixhe, Tulsa, Oklahoma
- Outstanding Venue: The Fed Galleries @ KCAD, Kendall College of Art and Design – Curator: Michele Bosak, Grand Rapids, Mich.

==== Jurors ====
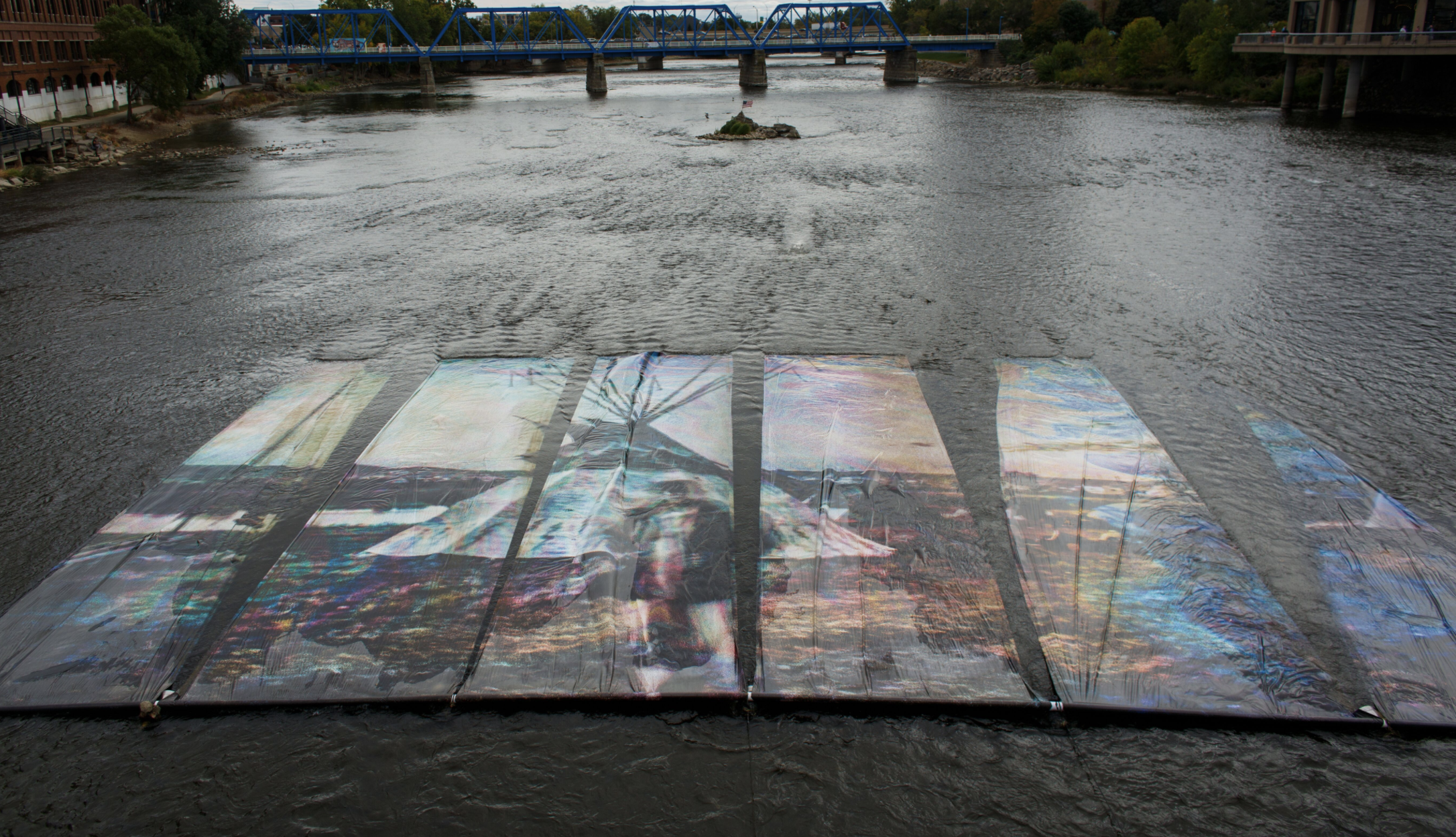
'Oil + Water' by Ryan Spencer Reed & Richard App

The ArtPrize Nine jurors included:

Award	Juror	Title
Juried Grand Prize	Gaëtane Verna	Director of The Power Plant Contemporary Art Gallery in Toronto
	Christopher Scoates	Director of Cranbrook Academy of Art and Art Museum in Detroit
	Gia Hamilton	Director at Joan Mitchell Center in New Orleans
Two-Dimensional	Miranda Lash	Curator of Contemporary Art at the Speed Art Museum in Louisville
Three-Dimensional	Rachel Adams	Senior Curator of Exhibitions for the University at Buffalo Art Galleries
Installation	Anila Quayyum Agha	Artist, Associate Professor of Drawing at Herron School of Art in Indianapolis, and $300,000 Public Vote and Juried Award winner at ArtPrize 2014 for her work Intersections
Time-Based	Scott Stulen	Director and President of Philbrook Museum of Art in Tulsa
Outstanding Venue	Larry Ossei-Mensah	New York-based independent curator and cultural critic, co-founder of ARTNOIR

== 2018 Competition ==
The 2018 ArtPrize competition, also known as ArtPrize 10, ran from September 19 to October 7.

Important Dates

Item	Dates
Venue Registration	March 5 – April 5
Artist Registration	April 16 – June 7
Connections	April 25 – June 28
Volunteer Registration	Opens early-August
Preview Week	September 12–18
ArtPrize 10	September 19 – October 7

Public Vote Grand Prize Winner

The String Project by Chelsea Nix and Mariano Cortez

Category Award Winners - Public Vote

- Two-Dimensional: The String Project by Chelsea Nix and Mariano Cortez
- Three-Dimensional: The Phoenix by Joe Butts
- Time-Based: Moving Experience by #shangled
- Installation: Sonder by Megan Constance Altieri

Juried Vote Grand Prize Winner

Brown, Carmine, and Blue by Le'Andra LeSeur

Category Award Winners - Juried Vote

- Two-Dimensional: PULSE Nightclub: 49 Elegies by John Gutoskey
- Three-Dimensional: 108 Death Masks: A Communal Prayer for Peace and Justice by Nikesha Breeze
- Installation: Heidelbergology; 2+2=8 by Tyree Guyton Heidelberg
- Venue: Grand Rapids African American Museum and Archives

Independent Award Winners

- Best Feature Film: Love, Gilda by Lisa D'Apolito
- Best Short Film: Starry Skies by Sarah Schmidt
- Hopcat WYCE ArtPrize Song of the Year: Shine by Molly
- Youth Collaboration Award: More Than Words by Zeeland Public Schools
- Youth Collaboration Award: Creation: 20 Paneled Public Art by Lakeland Cardinal Collaborative
- Educator Award: Cities of Silhouettes: A Visual Journal by Missy Dunaway
- Contemporary Black Art Award: 108 Death Masks: A Communal Prayer for Peace and Justice by Nikesha Breeze
- Artista Latino Award: THE STRING PROJECT by Chelsea Nix & Mariano Cortez
- Asian Artist Award: Black Panther by YanFang Inlow
- Asian Artist Award: Pure Michigan by Huaming Wang
- Decon + Reuse Vote Award: Abiding in the Shadow by Jeff Best
- American Civil Liberties Union Award: By Her Own Hand by Lora Robertson
- Social Action Committee Award: Reverse Alchemy by Anthony Thompson

== 2019 Project 1 ==
For 2019, ArtPrize began its "Project" exhibition series, with Project 1 running from September 7 to October 27.

Project 1: Crossed Lines was a series of multi-sited public art exhibitions in Grand Rapids, Michigan. Five international, national, and local artists will create multifaceted installations, urban interventions, and community-oriented projects, exploring the lines that unite and divide a city, and what it means to belong.

Project 1 Artists

- Skywalks - Downtown GR: Kaleidoscopic by Amanda Browder
- Community Center - MLK Jr. Park: Kaleidoscopic by Amanda Browder
- Tanglefoot Facade: Kaleidoscopic by Amanda Browder
- Rosa Parks Circle: Oracle of the Soulmates by Heather Hart
- MLK Jr. Park: Oracle of the Soulmates by Heather Hart
- Louis St. and Monroe Ave., Downtown GR: The Boom and the Bust by Olalekan Jeyifous
- Tanglefoot Building: Critical Infrastructure by Paul Amenta and Ted Lott

== 2021 Competition ==
The ArtPrize 2021 competition ran from September 16 to October 3.

Public Vote Grand Prize Winner

Before You Go by Christian Reichle and Monica Pritchard

Category Award Winners - Juried Vote

- Two-Dimensional: Aging Out / 18 years old by John Paul Goncalves
- Three-Dimensional: Soaked by Holly Ross
- Time-Based: Art pod by Stephen Smith (in collaboration with other artists)
- Installation: Project Unity: Ten Miles of Track in One Day by Hwa-Jeen Na and Yuge Zhou

Independent Awards

- Contemporary Black Art Awards: Planted by the Sacred Streams of Grace by Brian Whitfield
- Contemporary Black Art Awards: Ile Itaja - Shoppinglist by Olaniyi R. Akindiya Akirash
- Asian Art Awards: Before You Go by Christian Reichle and Monica Pritchard
- Asian Art Awards: Paper Cinderella by Michal Overholts
- Artista Latino Awards: The 20ths of January (Lunar Eclipse over Grand Rapids) by Russell Cooper
- Artista Latino Awards: Guardians of Sacred Space by Florencia Clement de Grandprey

== 2022 Competition ==
The ArtPrize 2022 competition ran from September 15 to October 2.

Visitor Favorite Awards

- 2D Winner: In My Eyes by Florencia Clement de Grandprey
- 3D Winner: AMERICAN EAGLE by Kasey Wells
- Installation Winner: Twigg the Forest Dragon by Jennifer Dunahee
- Time-Based Winner: Embodied-Healing Through Body Art by Kristen Zamora
- Digital Winner: Urban Arterials by Rob Finch

Award Winners - Juried Vote

- 2D Winner: For Dorothy Afro Harping by Harold Allen
- 2D Runner-Up: In Bello (In Time of War) by Erica Kuhl
- 3D Winner: LAST by Mo Jauw
- 3D Honorable Mention: Embedded by Mark Mennin
- Installation Winner: Seeking a Pleasant Peninsula by Maddison Chaffer
- Installation Honorable Mention: Who's Next by Brian Whitfield
- Time-Based Winner: Fusion
- Time-Based Honorable Mention: Ineffable Lypophrenia by C. Glass Dance Company
- Digital Winner: Derivations of a Gothic Arch Part 2 by Gary Mesa-Gaido
- Digital Honorable Mention: Algorithm + You = Art by Charles Cusack
- Contemporary Black Art Award: Poetry on Demand - My Poem, Your Topic by William Davis
- Asian Art Award: Sold to Slaughter by Stacie Tamaki
- Artista Latino Award: In My Eyes by Florencia Clement de Grandprey
- ArtPrize Venue Winner: Monroe Community Church

Artist-to-Artist Award

- Artist-to-Artist Award: Creation, Destruction, Reflection by Brad and Bryan Caviness

== 2023 Competition ==
The ArtPrize 2023 competition ran from September 14 to October 1.

=== Public Vote and Juried Vote Grand Prize Winner ===
- Raining Wisdom by Abdoulaye Conde
- Award Winners - Public Vote
- 2nd Place: Tale of Ten Dresses by Rebecca Humes
- 3rd Place: An Iris Collection of 5 by Peggy Slattery

=== Category Award Winners - Juried Vote ===
- 2D Winner: Mandy With Orchid by Stephen Brennan
- 2D Honorable Mention: Ménage by Roger Bruinekool
- 3D Winner: The Lost Mystics by Kumkum Fernando
- 3D Honorable Mention: The SpLaVCe Ship by Christopher Blay
- Installation Winner: The Art of Disruption by DisArt
- Installation Winner: The Zone of Authenticity by Whitney Pyles
- Installation Honorable Mention: Gambling on the Horizon by Mandy Cano Villalobos
- Time-Based Winner: The Future is a Constant Wake by Aryel Jackson
- Time-Based Honorable Mention: Being (T)here by Rene MG
- Digital Winner: Body-oddy-oddy-oddy: Destabilizing the Surveilling of Queer Bodies by Eric Souther and Benjamin Rosenthal
- Digital Honorable Mention: Fascism Killed the Old Gods by Matt Schenk

=== Visibility Awards ===
- Vanguard Award: #NOMORESTOLENSIST(A)S by Maya James
- Prism Award: Technophobia by Christopher Shields
- Originators Award: Serenity by Juan Pimentel
- Crossroads Award: Isa(moving) by Minyoung Kwak
- Horizontes Award: Caminantes / Wayfarers by Salvador Jimenez-Flores

=== Independent Awards ===
- Grand Rapids African American Arts & Music Award: Dimensional Dissection by Aidan Gardner
- Asian Art Award: After Party Guests by Harminder Boparai
- Artista Latino Award: Identity by Johnny Camacho
- Grand Rapids African American Arts & Music Award: From a Place of Privilege: A Celebration of the Black Woman by Laura Wilson

== 2024 Competition ==
The ArtPrize 2024 competition ran from September 13 to September 28.

=== Public Vote Awards ===
==== Public Vote Grand Prize ====
- Dynamic Sunset by John Katerberg
- Category Awards - Public Vote
- 2D Winner: The Prophets by Robert VanderZee
- 3D Winner: Tut's Tomb by Bruce Gorsline
- Installation Winner: Reflective Journey by Shirin Abedinirad
- Time-Based Winner: My Poem Your Topic by Endlesswill
- New Media Winner: Too Much Information by Bruce Holwerda
- +Design Winner: Ash desk with drawers by Zak Doezema-Nunez

=== Juried Vote Awards ===
==== Juried Vote Grand Prize ====
- TRAUMA PROJECT by Trauma Project
- Category Awards - Juried Vote
- 2D Winner: "Remember who you are." by Jonathan Harris
- 3D Winner: Old Stories by H. Highwater
- Installation Winner: marshmallow polypore variant by Samuelle Green
- Time-Based Winner: My Poem Your Topic by Endlesswill
- New Media Winner: Me So Calgon by Stafford Smith
- +Design Winner: Understory by Common Object Studio

=== Visibility Awards ===
- 456: A Reflection on Fatherhood by Keyon Lovett
- The Journal Project by Ruth Crowe
- What Does It Mean To Be Queer? by Isabel Dowell
- Fragments of Anima 1 & 2 (diptych) by Chris Pappan
- Sovereign by Pat ApPaul

== 2025 Competition ==
2025 Competition The ArtPrize 2025 competition took place from September 18 to October 4, 2025.

Participation

ArtPrize 2025 official participation numbers:

- More than 900,000 estimated visitors to Grand Rapids, Michigan
- More than 1,000 participating artists

Public Vote Awards

Public Vote Grand Prize

Arras – Mark Lewanski

Category Award Winners – Public Vote

- Two-Dimensional: The Forest – Robert VanderZee
- Three-Dimensional: Who's Adopting Who – Andy Sacksteder
- Installation: The Big Joyful Installation – Jax Kalin
- Time-Based: Robin Williams: A Living Portrait – Adam Bock
- New Media: Aqua Limina – Yiou Wang
- +Design: Morrigan – Blake Merkel

Juried Awards

Juried Grand Prize

Scraps – Second Vibess (Camille Steverson and Kaitlynn Fitzpatrick)

Category Award Winners – Juried Vote

- Two-Dimensional: Innerland – Tania Scheglova (Synchrodogs)
- Three-Dimensional: Persist – Cameron Stalheim
- Installation: Verdantine Tabernacle – Melissa Webb
- Time-Based: Women's Work – Renee Dempsey
- New Media: Moment – Dave Ryan
- +Design: Manufactured Memory: Ornament, Manufacturing, and the Architecture of Touch – Austin Mitchell and Will Wang (Voldt Lab)

Visibility Awards

- TZOMPANTLI Mexico en peligro de extinción. – Gennaro Garcia
- Sarmik; Beneath The Skin – Binhy
- Reporting from the Ghost Cities of the Metaverse: Decentraland – Sub Net
- Two Hundred Forty-Nine – Richard Dysard II
- Operation G.R.A.M.: Grannies Raid an Art Museum – Elijah Haswell
