= Swami Achootanand =

Indian poet and social reformer

- Born: Hira Lal; 6 May 1879; Umri, Sirsaganj, Mainpuri (now Firozabad district, Uttar Pradesh)
- Died: 20 July 1933; Kanpur, Uttar Pradesh
- Occupations: Social Reformer, Founder of Adi Hindu Movement
- Years active: 1923–1933

Swami Achhootanand, also known as Achutanand or Hariharanand, was a 20th century Indian anti-caste intellectual, Dalit writer, and social reformer. A former Arya Samaji, he became disillusioned with the Arya Samaj and established the Adi Hindu movement. He was a poet, critic, dramatist, and historian.

== Early life ==
Achhootanand was born on 6 May 1879 in a Chamar (Jatav) family in the Umari village of Mainpuri district. His parents Moti Ram and Ram Piari followed the Kabir panth. His father and uncles, Kalu Ram and Subedar Mathura Prasad and elder brother, Subedar Bant Lal, were all in the British Indian Army.

He was raised at the Devlali military cantonment in present-day Maharashtra, where his father was employed. For a Dalit at the time, he received relatively good education: the Christian missionaries at the cantonment school taught him to read Urdu, English, Hindi, and Gurumukhi.

== Arya Samaj ==
As a teenager, Achootanand became a follower of the religious leader Swami Sacchidananda, who taught him Bengali, Gujarati, Marathi, and Sanskrit languages. During the age 14-24, he traveled across north India with mendicant saints. According to his biographer, Chandrika Prasad Jigyasu, he read a variety of religious literature, including the Guru Granth Sahib; the Bijak of Kabir; the works of various other Bhakti poets (including Dadu Dayal, Ravidas and Namdev); Romesh Chunder Dutt's Bengali translation of the Rig Veda; and several history books.

Achootanand became an enthusiastic participant in the Arya Samaj social reform campaigns. He adopted the name "Harihar", and worked on the Shuddi (re-conversion to Hinduism) ritual campaigns, that sought to prevent the lower castes from converting to Islam or Christianity.

After a few years of working with the Arya Samaj, he became disillusioned with the organization. He came to believe that the Hindu social reformers were only concerned about the declining strength of the Hindus in the colonial census: they had no intention of working towards actual social equality.

== Adi Hindu movement ==
After facing caste-based discrimination within the Arya Samaj movement, Achootanand left Arya Samaj. He gave up his Arya Samaj name "Harihar", and adopted the name "Achutanand", literally "somebody whose bliss is untouched" or "somebody who rejoices with the untouched/untouchables". The word "Achut" was used as a deorgatory term, and was commonly thought to mean "untouchable"; Achutanand interpreted it as "untouched", implying purity.

Achootanand opposed the Arya Samaj and the Indian National Congress (whose leaders in Kanpur included Arya Samajis) using sharp rhetoric. In 1919, he launched the All India Achhut Caste Reform Sabha ("All India Untouchable Caste Reform Assembly"). In the 1920s, he labeled the Congress a Brahmanical organization, opposed the non-cooperation movement, and supported the visit of Prince of Wales Edward to India. By 1922, he had become widely popular among the local untouchables.

He started campaigning against the Arya Samaj through his writings and protests. He was invited to Delhi and successfully debated with Arya Samaji leader, Swami Akhilanand over scriptures. He then laid the foundation of "Jati Sudhar Achhoot Sabha'" and was conferred the title of "Shri 108" by proposal of Arya preacher, Pandit Ramchandra & Naubat Singh, the minister of Shahdara Samaj in Delhi.

In 1922, Achootanand led Chamars out of Arya Samaj to establish the Adi Hindu movement. He thus pioneered the first social reform movement for Dalits in the Hindi belt. He portrayed the untouchables as "Adi Hindus" ("original Hindus"), the original, peace-loving, and cultured inhabitants of India, who had been enslaved after the Aryan conquest. Apparently influenced by Jyotirao Phule, he portrayed the upper castes as foreign invaders, who exploited the lower castes. Following the Ad Dharm movement of Punjab, he chose the medieval low-caste saint Ravidas as a central figure of the movement. The Adi Hindu ideology considered Bhakti as the original religious tradition of India, encouraging direct interaction between the devotee and the god, and discouraging the use of Brahmin priests and Vedic rituals as intermediaries.

In 1925, Achootanand settled at Kanpur, where several Dalit entrepreneurs and businessmen lived. The Adi Hindu movement became popular in the United Provinces, and attracted untouchables from a variety of backgrounds including the first-generation educated, village headmen, and rich businessmen. His closest followers were the Dalit elites, such as the Chamar merchants, who had become prosperous through involvement in British leather trade. Most of his close associates came from the Chamar caste: Gauri Shankar Aherwar, Jhamlal Aherwar, Girdhari Lal Kuril, and Chaudhari Ram Dayal Kuril. His other close associates included Shivprasad Bareta (a Dhobi) and Maikulal (a Kori).

Achootanand held eight All India Adi Hindu Conferences at Delhi (1923), Nagpur (1924), Hyderabad (1925), Madras (1926), Allahabad (1927), Bombay (1928), Amravati (1929), and again, Allahabad (1930). He also organized three special Adi Hindu Conferences at Delhi, Meerut, and Allahabad. In addition, he held 15 state-level conferences at various places in present-day Uttar Pradesh.

By 1930, Achootanand's Adi Hindu conferences attracted participation from members of several lower castes, including Chamars, Dhobis, Pasis, Bhangis (Valmikis), Kureels, Dhusias and Koris.

== Support for Ambedkar ==
On 22 February 1928, Achootanand shared stage with the Dalit leader B. R. Ambedkar during the All India Adi Hindu Sabha meeting.

Achootanand welcomed King Edward VII, the Prince of Wales and even demanded proposals for Depressed Classes which was going to be submitted before Simon Commission. While the Congress opposed the Simon Commission, the Adi Hindus welcomed it, because it recognized the Dalits on a national political platform. On 30 November 1928, Achootanand met Ambedkar in Lucknow, during the Simon Commission hearing. During Round Table Conference held in London in 1931, he supported Ambedkar through telegrams and created awareness on the issue among the untouchables of Kanpur.

Achootanand strongly opposed the use of the term "Harijan", coined by the Congress leader Mahatma Gandhi, to refer to the untouchables.

In 1932, when Gandhi declared a fast-unto-death to oppose the separate electorates granted to untouchable Hindus through the Communal Award, Achootanand advised Ambedkar to compromise with Gandhi, fearing reprisals against untouchables in case of Gandhi's death.

== Literary career ==
Achootanand initiated a new stream of Dalit pamphlet literature in Hindi language, in the 1920s. To raise awareness among the Depressed Classes, he started his own publication, and composed poetry under the pen name Harihar. Achootanand was one of the pioneers of Dalit literature in Hindi.

In 1922, he started his first monthly paper Achut from Delhi, but it closed down in 1923. Later, he started Prachin Hindu, but that too closed within a year. He then established the Adi Hindu Press and published The Adi-Hindu Journal from Kanpur during 1924–1932.

Achootanand was a philosopher-poet and also a playwright. His Hindi books include:

- Shambuk Balidan, drama
- Achhut Pukar, religious songs
- Mayanand Balidan (biography)
- Pakhand Khandani
- Adi-Vansh Ka Danka

== Death ==
His health worsened after the Virat Adi Hindu Conference held at Gwalior in 1932. He died in 1933 at Zhabar Idgah in Kanpur, Uttar Pradesh.

He was buried in a graveyard near the Nazirabad Police Station in Kanpur. In 1974, Rajendranath Aherwar, the eldest son of his associate Gauri Shankar Aherwar, set up the Sri 108 Swami Achutanand Smarak Samiti ("Honorable 108 Swami Achutanand Memorial Committee"). The Committee held celebrations on his birth anniversary, annually on 3 May.

Chandrika Prasad Jigyasu wrote a biography of Achutanand, titled Swami Achutanand 'Harihar' (1968).
