= Mia Tavonatti =

American artist and writer

- Education: California State University (MFA)
- Occupations: Artist, writer
- Known for: Mosaics
- Awards: Art Prize
- Website: miatavonatti.com

Mia Tavonatti is an American artist and writer known for her large installation mosaics inspired by Renaissance imagery and contemporary sculptural abstracts. Tavonatti received first place at Art Prize in 2011 for her 9'w x 13'h stained glass mosaic Crucifixion and runner up in 2010 for her 7'h x 13'w mosaic Svelata. Tavonatti's work is personal and reflective of her own experiences, which she uses to serve as an inspiration for aspiring artists.

== Education ==
Tavonatti attended California State University, where she earned her Master of Fine Arts in illustration. Tavonatti started off her career illustrating children's books, many of which she authored herself, though her work extends over several mediums. On top of her work with glass mosaics and illustrations, Tavonatti has worked extensively with large installation murals and sculptures.

== Major works and projects ==
Tavonatti began her mosaic work in 1999 with her first commission of a series of nine mosaics for Newport Elementary School. Tavonatti's early work features the double indirect method of mosaics which requires a greater precision than other approaches and requires mosaic tile to be fixed together before being attached to a base. After discovering the direct method, Tavonatti's work evolved allowing her to achieve greater detail as was the case for Tavonatti's 2011 Crucifixion which placed first at Art Prize with a reward of $250,000. Tavonatti channelled this award directly towards her Power of Words Project as a part of her Svelata Foundation. Tavonatti's Power of Words Project mission has been to unite communities through art and to expand the creative potential of humanity through the transformative power of art. The Power of Words Project aims to create networks of aspiring artists within communities and provide mentorship to young artists. Tavonatti has been a member of the Society of American Mosaic Artists since 2012. She attributes her artistic growth to her involvement with SAMA.

== Artistic career ==
=== Svelata Series ===
Tavonatti's 2010 Svelata series is made up of seventeen individual autobiographical works depicting the duality of life as seen, metaphorically, in the juxtaposition between water, representing spirit or the devine, and fabric representing the material life, veil, or illusion of life, in her compositions. Tavonatti uses herself as the subject in this series to explore universal concepts of duality through her own journey. Her surreal compositions depict her struggles and successes as she attempts to navigate and integrate her inner and outer lives through a ten-year period. The title Svelata is an Italian verb that translates as "to be unveiled, or revealed." Tavonatti centers her work around the idea of "unveiling" with the Svelata series revealing Tavonatti's emotional, physical and deliriously journey through life.

=== Crucifixion ===
Tavonatti's Crucifixion, which won at Art Prize 2011 is one of her most recognized works. Tavonatti found inspiration for the work from her studies in Italy and she has attributed Renaissance mosaics as the influence behind her Crucifixion. The Crucifixion was originally commissioned as an altarpiece for St. Killian Catholic Church, but was entered into Art Prize after construction delays. The mural is currently on display at Cornerstone University and a second version now hangs at St. Killian Catholic Church.

=== Awards and nominations ===
- 2010: ArtPrize Runner-Up, Svelata
- 2011: ArtPrize Grand Prize, Crucifixion of Christ
- 2019: Best Architectural Project, Baptismal Font and Pool
- 2019: Contemporary Innovation Award, Origin

== The Svelata Foundation ==
The Svelata Foundation was created following Tavonatti's exhibition of her Svelata series at the Museo Arsenale in 2008. The Svelata Foundation's most notable project has been The Power of Words Project which was created with the funds from Tavonatti's 2011 Grand Prize Crucifixion of Christ. The Power of Words Project comes with the mission of uniting established artists with aspiring artists through the creation of murals. These murals are centered around the communities in which they are displayed and they emphasize community involvement. The Power of Words Project also aims to expose the creative process of art-making to the public to encourage artistic expressions from artists and non-artists alike. The Power of Words Project initially started in California but has since traveled to the Upper Peninsula of Michigan with murals appearing in Iron Mountain, Manistique, Marquette, and Gladstone.

== Selected works ==
- 2000: Sea Shells, H 3’ x W 7’. Stained glass.
- 2010: Svelata, H 7” x W 13”. Stained glass.
- 2011: Crucifixion of Christ, H 13” x W 9”. Stained glass.
- 2012: Metamorphosis, H 36” x W 36”. Stained glass.
- 2015: Colorado, H 24” x W 36”. Stained glass.
- 2015: Kaynak, H 30” x W 20” x D 4”. Stained glass smalti, fiberglass mesh and resin.
- 2015: Glory, H 18” x W 18” x D 1.50”. Stained glass.
- 2016: Batyam, H 41” x W 32” x D 2”. Stained glass.
- 2016: Water Ring, H 30” x W 24” x D 5”. Stained glass, smalti, fiberglass mesh and resin.
- 2017: Baptismal Font and Pool, 36’h x 36″w x 36″d. Stained glass, smalti and fused glass mosaic set in thinset.
- 2018: Origin, Stained glass, smalti, and fused glass, fiberglass mesh and resin support
