= Anila Quayyum Agha =

Pakistani-American artist (born 1965)

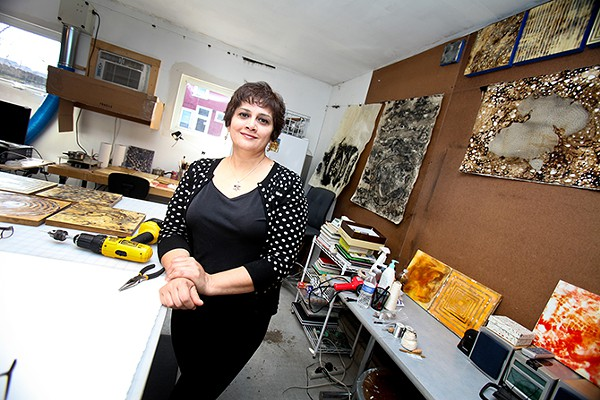
- Born: 1965 (age 60–61); Lahore, Pakistan
- Education: National College of Arts; University of North Texas
- Known for: Painting, Drawing, Sculpture, Installation art, Contemporary art
- Awards: ArtPrize (2014); Smithsonian Artist Research Fellowship (2020)

Anila Quayyum Agha (born 1965) is a Pakistani-American cross-disciplinary artist. Agha explores social and gender roles, global politics, cultural multiplicity, and mass media through drawing, painting, and large-scale installations. In 2014, her installation Intersections won the international art competition ArtPrize, receiving both the Public Vote Grand Prize and, in a tie with Sonya Clark, the Juried Grand Prize — the first time in the competition's history that the two prizes were split. She is known internationally for large-scale, laser-cut cube installations that use light and pattern drawn from Islamic art and architecture to create immersive, shared spaces.

== Early life and education ==
Agha was born in Lahore, Pakistan, in 1965. Drawn to architecture from a young age, she was excluded from spaces such as mosque prayer rooms because of her gender, an experience she has cited as a formative influence on her later work.

Agha studied at the National College of Arts in Lahore, where she specialised in textile design and received a Bachelor of Fine Arts in 1989. She subsequently moved to the United States, where she undertook a Master of Fine Arts in fibre arts at the University of North Texas. Wikipedia's article previously gave 2004 as her graduation year; a source from Rice University Art Gallery instead states 2001. According to the Frist Art Museum, Agha moved to the United States in 1999.

== Career ==
Agha's experience of living between different faiths and cultures — including Islam and Christianity, and Pakistan and the United States — has informed her art. Through her work, she examines cultural and social issues affecting women in patriarchal societies, alongside the immigrant experience of alienation and transience.

=== Academic ===
In 2008, Agha moved to Indianapolis to teach at the Herron School of Art, where she served as associate professor of drawing. In 2020, she was appointed Morris Eminent Scholar in Art at Augusta University in Georgia.

=== Drawing and painting ===
Drawing on her background in textile and fabric design, Agha combines processes such as embroidery, wax, dye, and silk-screen printing within her drawings and paintings. She creates patterns based on Islamic geometric and interlace designs through hand-cutting, laser-cutting, and sewing on paper, using embroidery as a drawing method that bridges modern materials with historical associations between textile work and domestic servitude. Her practice has been read as a challenge to the gendered categorisation of textile work as domestic craft rather than fine art.

=== Installation ===
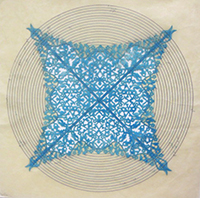

In 2013, Agha began working with light and shadow in Intersections, a laser-cut wood cube measuring six-and-a-half feet on each side and encasing a single light bulb. The work explores binaries of public and private, light and shadow, and static and dynamic through the symmetry of its geometric design and the shadows it casts. The cube's walls display Moorish-influenced patterns drawn from the Alhambra, a site where Islamic and Christian traditions intersect. Agha has said that memories of being excluded from mosques as a girl in Pakistan, combined with her visits to the Alhambra, prompted her to create a work that would include viewers regardless of race, gender, or ethnicity.

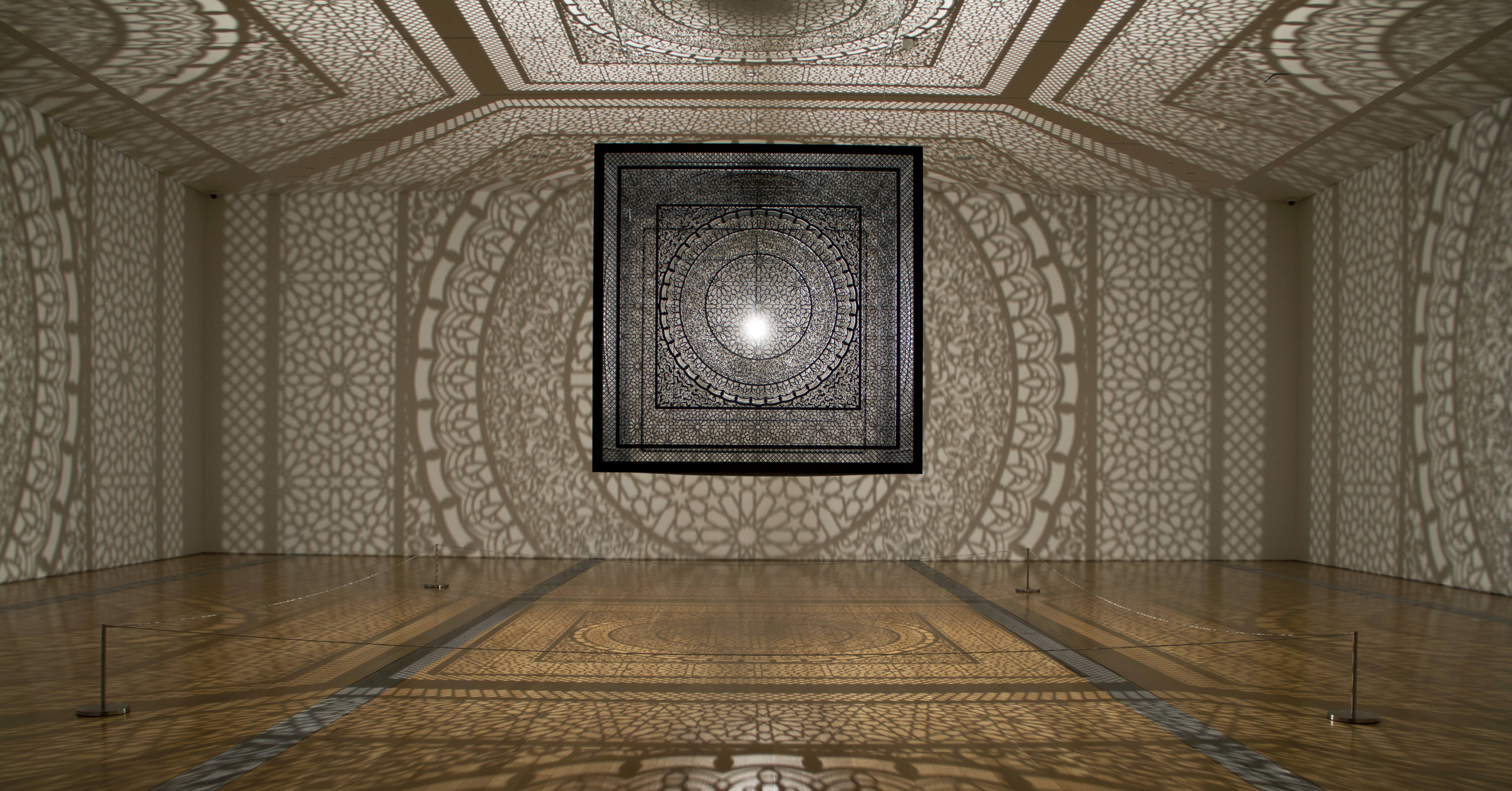

=== Later work and exhibitions ===
Agha's more recent installations have continued to engage with themes of migration, transience, and displacement. Anila Quayyum Agha: Dualities, shown at the Bruce Museum in Greenwich, Connecticut, presented three large-scale sculptural works alongside works on paper reflecting her training in textile design. In 2025, she was an artist in residence at the Joan Mitchell Center in New Orleans.

A nationally touring mid-career retrospective, Anila Quayyum Agha: Interwoven, organised by the Westmoreland Museum of American Art, traces two decades of Agha's work, including her light installations, embroidered and beaded drawings, and wall sculptures; the Frist Art Museum served as its final venue. Anila Quayyum Agha: Geometry of Light, on view at the Seattle Art Museum from 27 August 2025 to 19 April 2026, was described by the museum as the first solo exhibition by a Pakistani-American artist in its ninety-year history.

== Personal life ==
Agha lives in Indianapolis, Indiana, and has also resided in Augusta, Georgia, in connection with her academic appointment there.

== Awards and recognition ==
Agha's work has been exhibited in solo and group shows across the United States and in the United Arab Emirates, India, and Spain. She is represented by the Sundaram Tagore Gallery in New York City. In addition to winning ArtPrize, she has received the Efroymson Arts Fellowship (2009), the Creative Renewal Fellowship from the Indianapolis Arts Council (2013), an Indiana Arts and Humanities grant, the Cincinnati Art Museum's 2017 Schiele Prize, the Sculptors and Painters Grant from the Joan Mitchell Foundation (2019), and the Smithsonian Artist Research Fellowship (2020). She has also received the DeHaan Artist of Distinction Award on two occasions (2018 and 2021). In 2019, her work was included in She Persists, a collateral event of the Venice Biennale featuring twenty-two contemporary feminist artists.

In 2025, Dancing Foxes Press, in collaboration with the Westmoreland Museum of American Art, published Anila Quayyum Agha: Interwoven. The book documents her immersive installations, embroidery, drawings, paintings, and wall sculptures.

== Collections ==
Agha's work is held in a number of public collections, including:

- Kunsthaus Zürich, Zurich, Switzerland
- Eskenazi Museum of Art, Bloomington, Indiana
- Grand Rapids Art Museum, Grand Rapids, Michigan
- Peabody Essex Museum, Salem, Massachusetts
- Cincinnati Art Museum, Cincinnati, Ohio
- Kiran Nadar Museum of Art, Delhi, India
- Weisman Art Museum, Minneapolis, Minnesota
