= Shinji Turner-Yamamoto =

Japanese artist

- Born: Osaka, Japan
- Education: Kyoto City University of Arts, it:Accademia di belle arti di Bologna
- Known for: Site-specific art, Sculpture, Painting
- Notable work: Global Tree Project
- Website: turneryamamoto.net

Shinji Turner-Yamamoto is a Japanese artist based in the U.S. known for paintings, sculptures, and site-specific art installations employing elemental materials such as trees, fossils, and minerals, creating profound viewer connections with nature. He works with identifiable imagery to encourage humanity to encounter the essential in nature and time in new and unexpected ways and is committed to using historic and natural elements in his work as meditations on the universe.

== Biography ==
Shinji Turner-Yamamoto was born in Osaka, Japan. He studied at Kyoto City University of Arts, and, sponsored by the Italian government, at it:Accademia di belle arti di Bologna, where he lived for eleven years. His work has been the subject of solo shows at it:Museo d'Arte Contemporanea Villa Croce, Genoa, Italy (1999); Crawford Art Gallery, Cork, Ireland (2002); Contemporary Arts Center, Cincinnati, OH, USA (2010); the Ippaku-tei Teahouse, Embassy of Japan + Shigeko Bork MU Project, Washington, DC, USA (2008); Alice F. and Harris K. Weston Art Gallery / Aronoff Center (the National Endowment for the Arts Art Works/Visual Arts category grant), Cincinnati, OH, USA (2016). His site-specific installations include Palazzo Ducale, ASIART Asian Contemporary Art: Biennale d'Arte Contemporanea, Genoa, Italy (1999); Saigyo-an Teahouse, Kyoto Art Walk, Kyoto, Japan (2005); Gobi desert, Mongolia, Land Art Mongolia International Land Art Biennial (2010); Deconsecrated Holy Cross Church and Monastery, Cincinnati, OH, USA (2010); SiTE:LAB at an abandoned industrial building, Grand Rapids, MI, USA (2011) which received the ArtPrize International Juried Award. Exhibitions include "Substance and Increase" curated by Gregory Volk, SAPAR CONTEMPORARY Gallery+Incubator, New York, NY, USA (2017); "Alchemy: Transformations in Gold" curated by Laura Burkhalter, Des Moines Art Center, Des Moines, IA, USA (2017).

== Selected Works/Projects ==
=== Global Tree Project ===
(2000-) - series of site-specific works -

His Global Tree Project explores a poetic reunion with nature, making visible bonds and similarities between plant life and humanity, emphasizing ecological wisdom and the interconnectedness of all life. Shinji Turner-Yamamoto: Global Tree Project published by DAMIANI, fall 2012, documents 11 projects worldwide realized in a ruined folly on a cliff overlooking the Celtic Sea, an 8th-century Kiyomizu Temple Sutra Hall, a garden in New Delhi, the Mongolian Gobi Desert, and abandoned architectural landmarks in the American Midwest. The two recent commissioned site-specific projects are: Global Tree Project: AXIS MUNDI (2015) for Zentrum Paul Klee, Bern, Switzerland, and Global Tree Project: ISTANBUL (2016), an installation for the historic ruin of an abandoned Jewish orphanage, Istanbul, Turkey, through the Beşiktaş International Garden and Flower Festival.

=== Pentimenti ===
(2010-) - series of sculptural works -

"Pentimenti is the plural of pentimento, a word describing the visible traces of earlier work that can be seen through the layers of a finished painting. Shinji Turner-Yamamoto takes on this term metaphorically rather than literally, employing it to title sculpture rather than painting but embracing its acknowledgement of layered artistic endeavors. Each of these small sculptures is a complex combination of materials, and they reach their completed form not only through the artist's hand but by the processes of nature and time. The scope of geologic time presents an almost impossible set of numbers to comprehend. Materials we come into contact with on a regular basis—coal, stone, gold existed on Earth long before life, as earlier forms of life existed long before human civilization came into being. Throughout his body of work, Turner-Yamamoto has chosen to use materials so old that ancient doesn't even describe them accurately."

== See also ==
- Ecopsychology
- Environmental art
