= Adonna Khare =

American artist

Adonna Khare (born c. 1980) is an American artist from Burbank, California mainly focused on large-scale pencil drawings. She received her Masters of Fine Art from California State University, Long Beach. Her work has been collected by prestigious public and private collections throughout the world. In 2012 she won the world’s largest art competition ArtPrize, competing against over 1500 artists from all around the world.

She has been featured by Los Angeles Times, NPR, The Huffington Post, Daily Mail, Juxtapoz, Mashable, My Modern Metropolis, Saatchi Gallery.

== Career ==
- 2014 State of the Art: Crystal Bridges Museum
- 2014 38th Annual Salon National des Artiste Animaliers
- 2014 Face to Face: Yellowstone Art Museum
- 2015 Natural World: Adonna Khare and Jon Ng: Fullerton College
- 2015 EMS Nude Survey 1: Jamie Brooks Fine Art: Costa Mesa, CA
- 2015 Bunnymania: ChunKing Studios, Los Angeles
- 2015 Menagerie at the Grand Rapids Art Museum
- 2015 Teton ArtLab - Artist In Residency
- 2016 Adonna Khare: The Kingdom: Boise Art Museum
- 2016 State of the Art, Minneapolis Institute of Art, Minneapolis
- 2016 Natural Causes, CASS Contemporary Art Gallery, Tampa Florida
- 2016 A Fine Line, Paul Mahder Gallery, Healdsberg, CA
- 2016 Off the Page, Mesa Arts Center, Mesa, AZ
