= R. S. Khare =

Indian professor of anthropology

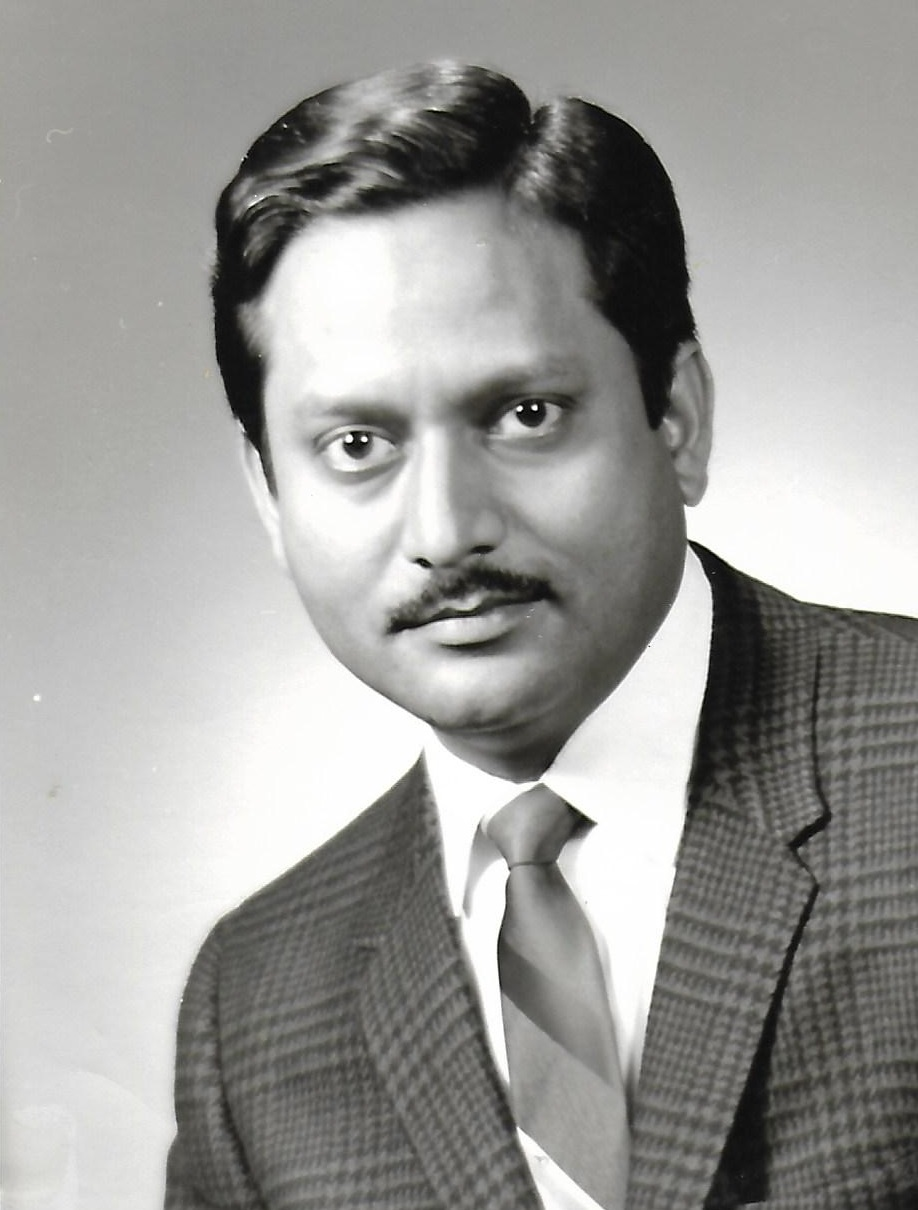
- R.S. Khare in 1970
- Born: Ravindra S. Khare; September 23, 1936; Lakimpur-Kheri, Uttar Pradesh, India
- Education: M.A., Lucknow University (1957); Ph.D., Lucknow University (1962)
- Occupation: Anthropologist
- Website: anthropology.as.dev.artscid9.virginia.edu/people/ravindra-khare

R. S. Khare (born 1936 in Lakhimpur Kheri District, Uttar Pradesh, India) is a socio-cultural anthropologist and a Professor of Anthropology at the University of Virginia, U.S. He is known for studying "from within/without" India's changing society, religions, food systems, and political cultures, and for following the trajectories of contemporary Indian traditional and modern cultural discourses. His anthropology has endeavored to widen reasoned bridges across the India-West cultural, religious-philosophical, and literary distinctions and differences.

== Career ==
R. S. Khare (2013; Brooks Hall 305, University of Virginia)

He obtained his M.A. (1957) and Ph.D. (1962) in socio-cultural anthropology from Lucknow University, India. His doctoral field research (1958–61) concerned the relationships domestic ritual purity-pollution practices had with the health and sanitation issues in a low-caste village near Lucknow. He simultaneously field studied how Lucknow's orthodox Kanyakubja Brahmins modernized. During his postdoctoral fellowship (1963–64) at the University of Chicago, while analyzing his researches, he was exposed to the studies of McKim Marriott and Milton Singer at Chicago, while already familiar with Louis Dumont's writings on the Indian caste system and civilization. Khare spent 1972 doing additional fieldwork in Rae Bareli (Uttar Pradesh), explicating the value-practice structures of Indian food, kinship, and ritual systems. The results were written up during a visiting fellowship (1974-75) at the Institute for Advanced Study, Princeton, at Clifford Geertz's initiative. Khare's second research phase (1978-1995) included a series of field research trips for studying, first, urban Indian Dalit (the erstwhile Untouchable) communities and their local leaders and intellectuals; second, issues in anthropology of Indian food systems and food ideologies; and, third, aspects in the intellectual history of anthropology in—and on—India (including the contributions of M. N. Srinivas). Khare's third research phase (1996-2006) involved collaboration with a few prominent north Indian Dalit writers, thinkers, and political leaders in Lucknow, Kanpur and New Delhi, while also developing cultural critiques of the sharpening Indian caste, class, and gender inequalities, religious nationalism, and subaltern identity politics in India. The latest phase (2006-present) has concerned the studies of and issues in Indian modernity amid social diversity; anthropology of globalizing South Asian foods; and the post Cold War reshaping of India-Europe/West cultural dialectics.

Khare established and then chaired anthropology (1957-63) at the Kanya-Kubja College (now Jai Narayan College) in Lucknow. After Chicago, he spent a year (1964-65) in the Anthropology Department at Lucknow University, and moved on to the University of Wisconsin, Green Bay (1966-71) in the U.S. He chaired its newly created multidisciplinary "Modernization Concentration." In 1971, he joined University of Virginia as professor of anthropology just as anthropology separated as a department from the joint sociology-anthropology unit. At Virginia, he founded and led (1976-1992) an interdisciplinary faculty scholarly activities committee, sponsored by the Center for Advanced Studies and its director, Dean W. Dexter Whitehead, a physicist scholar-administrator. Concurrently, he chaired an International Commission on the Anthropology of Food. During 1990–91, Khare was a fellow of the university's Commonwealth Center for Literary and Cultural Change. He later became Interim Chair (2000–01) of the Department of Anthropology. In May 2004, he gave the XI D.N. Majumdar Memorial Lecture at his alma mater, Lucknow University (see principal publications). He has chaired the Center on Critical Human Survival Issues from Fall 1998 to December, 2018.

The major universities and research institutions where Khare has visited as a visiting faculty or fellow include: University of Chicago (1970); Indian Institute of Advanced Studies in Shimla, India (1971); École des Hautes Études en sciences sociales, Paris (Fall 1972); the Institute for Advanced Study, Princeton (fellow, 1974–75); Wolfson College and the Institute of Socio-Cultural Anthropology, Oxford University, U.K. (elected visiting fellow, winter and spring 1979–80, and again in May–June 1990); and Wissenschaftskolleg zu Berlin, Germany (visiting fellow, 1996–97).

== Contributions ==
Khare intensively studied for two decades contemporary India's social "top" (i.e., Kanyakubja Brahmins and Upper Castes) and the "bottom" (Dalits). His early studies explicated how the changing caste/class hierarchies impacted orthodox Hindu hearth and family, and kinship and community. These led to showing how ideologically deeply rooted and distinct were the conceptions of Indic personhood, agency, social relations, food thoughts, social-ritual practices, and the associated cosmological semiotics. But politically to Dalits, this privileged upper-caste Indian worldview had long festered with glairing moral blindness and socioeconomic inequalities and injustices, instigating twentieth century Dalits to demand their rightful moral-social, material and political rights. To do so was also to re-forge assertively their new identity, ideology, and pragmatic modern political activism. For Khare, studying Dalits also meant, inter alia, critically reevaluating approaches of Louis Dumont and McKim Marriott to Indian caste society and civilization. Khare's comparative critique employed the multi-stringed approach inherent in Indian traditional modern thought ways, agencies and actions. Dumont's mutually exclusive and "opposed" India-West ideological structures, by contrast, had precluded, for example, any and all the different Indic constructions of individual self, personhood and agency. Dumont had hence long attracted criticisms. Similarly, Marriott's rigorous attempts to create a comprehensive parsimonious transactional model for "the Hindu world" also excluded the crucial moral-spiritual self-locations (e.g. of reformist devotional saints) and their attendant intentional practical-political messages and agencies. For Marriott, all that was crucially Hindu had to be foundationally transactional.

Khare's 1984 study outlined an alternative Indic model of the individual based on his work on Dalits and their thinkers. It showed how Dalit ascetics (among other saints) had long identified an activist spiritual-moral self to launch potent moral-social-political critiques of the upper-caste world and its biased and truncated worldview. Arjun Appadurai had soon offered, reviewing similar newer research initiatives, a critical historical-cultural evaluation of Dumont's views on India. Khare turned to explicate different reasoning platforms that the Indic/Hindu/Indian "cultural logic" followed in life, tracing the roles of intentions in Hindu reasoning patterns, and of social inequalities and conflicts in Indian traditional modern life quandaries. As thus both esoteric and exoteric India struggled, if mostly messily and imperfectly, amid the challenged ideals, norms and social privileges, then a suitably readapted sociology-anthropology was also sought (e.g., as Srinivas's studies showed). Both strands had critically magnified during the nineties India. The Islamic moral-social-legal issues in Muslim life were no less affected, requiring, as Khare's anthology underscored, closer studies of the Islamic sectarian and inter-sectarian positions, and of vexing societal and moral-legal-medical issues, whether it was in India or elsewhere. Latest, globalizing India is flooded with newer historical-cultural, literary and multi-media representations, all clamoring to frame this new century India vis-à-vis, mainly, Western Europe and America. Posing this change, D. Shyam Babu, a Dalit researcher-journalist, in collaboration with Khare, assembled a cluster of autobiographic narratives to show how, in actual life, one still encountered caste inequalities in India.

Among Khare's professional contributions, two broad areas stand out, one relating to the interdisciplinary initiatives and organizations developed mostly at or from University of Virginia, and the other in starting and establishing the International Commission on Anthropology of Food.

== Interdisciplinary studies at University of Virginia ==
From 1976 to 1992, Khare led a wide-ranging interdisciplinary faculty committee for scholarly collaboration at the University of Virginia. The Committee on the Comparative Study of Society and Culture was sponsored by the then Center for Advanced Studies. Composed of distinguished university faculty members, the committee engaged wide-ranging topics by inviting scholars, holding conferences, lecture series, symposia, or single-day colloquia. Some scholars joined onto specific writing projects. The committee's work led to a series of publications (lasting until 1994), including a series of Working Papers

The "Center on Critical Human Survival Issues", a multidisciplinary faculty-student collaborative, was started in 1998 at University of Virginia and continues to the present. It sought to discuss through multidisciplinary collaboration crucial human survival issues that arose during the late twentieth- and early twenty-first century, consciously fostering active faculty-student collaboration to identify issues for exploration and to execute programming on such issues. Among the publications have been the research and conference proceedings, sponsored books, and selected program video/DVD recordings.

== International Commission on Anthropology of Food ==
In 1977, Khare initiated the International Commission on Anthropology of Food and Food Problems (or ICAF), sponsored by the International Union of Anthropologists and Ethnologists. The international commission promoted global anthropological studies of regional and national food systems, nutritional issues, and hunger problems. Beginning in 1978, he invited Mary Douglas, then at the Russell Sage Foundation, to be the co-chair of the commission. The initial planning meetings were held at the Wenner-Gren Foundation for Anthropological Research in New York and in Philadelphia to organize internationally and to participate in the 10th International Congress of Anthropologists and Ethnologists in New Delhi, India, in December 1978. The Commission formed several regional transnational Working Groups in North America, Europe, South Asia, and Southeast Asia. Igor de Garine led the European Regional Group. The first international brochure and newsletter for the commission was put out in 1980. The first ICAF Occasional Report was published in April 1981 to collect a) different national, transnational, and global food and nutrition research and b) teaching and policy-related initiatives relevant to the anthropology of food and food problems. Douglas and Khare (1979) statement on the Commission outlined the anthropological background of the commission and ambitiously looked ahead to collaboration with social sciences, and international policy and research organizations. Both Khare and Douglas published their studies of food/culinary structures, rituals and food sharing were published. Douglas left the Commission in 1984.

In 1985, Professor G. Ainsworth Harrison, a biological anthropologist at University of Oxford (U.K.), joined the commission as its vice-chair, to help focus the commission's work on bio-cultural issues and to relate food issues to fragile ecological and environmental conditions in different world regions. The ICAF Occasional Reports (issued between 1986 -1992) recorded the resulting activities, including several collaborative international research activities, visiting lectures, conferences, and research publications.

The ICAF continues today. Reconfigured and with a major focus on the European and American countries and western cultures, the commission now operates in Barcelona, Spain, under Prof. Dr. F. Xavier Medina's leadership.

== Principal publications ==
- "The Changing Brahmans: Associations and Elites among the Kanya-Kubjas of North India." Chicago: University of Chicago Press. 1970.
- "The Hindu Hearth and Home," Delhi: Vikas Publications, 1976a.
- "Culture and Reality: Essays on the Hindu System of Managing Foods," Shimla: Indian Institute of Advanced Studies Shimla, 1976b.
- "The Untouchable as himself: Ideology, Identity and Pragmatism among the Lucknow Chamars." Cambridge: Cambridge University Press, 1984.
- "Culture and Democracy: Anthropological Reflections on Modern India." Lanham (MD): University Press of America. 1985.
- "Food, Society and Culture," Durham, N.C.: Carolina Academic Press, 1986 (with M. S. A. Rao)
- "The Eternal Food: Gastronomic ideas and Experiences of Hindus and Buddhists," New York: SUNY Press, 1992.
- "Cultural Diversity and Social Discontent: Anthropological Studies on Contemporary India," Delhi: Sage, 1998.
- "Perspectives on Islamic Law, Justice and Society." Lanham, MD, New York: Rowmen and Littlefield, 1999.
- "Strands in Cultural Imagination: Interpreting Scholarly Itineraries in Indian Anthropology," Eastern Anthropologist, Vol. 58, no. 1, 2005.
- "Caste, Hierarchy, and Individualism: Indian Critiques of Louis Dumont's Contributions"Oxford in India Readings in Sociology and Social Anthropology New Delhi: Oxford University Press, 2006.
- "India and the West"(Special journal volume on Globalizing History and Culture), New Literary History Vol. 40, No. 2, 2009 (with Ralph Cohen).
- "Caste in Life: Experiencing Inequalities." Delhi: Pearson, 2011 (with D. Shyam Babu).

== Selected recent articles ==
- "Looking Back to Look Ahead" in Curried Cultures: Globalization, Indian Food and the Urban Middle Class. Eds.: Krishnendu Ray and Tulasi Srinivas. Berkeley (CA): University of California Press. 2012.
- "The Unch-nich Challenge in Life: Changing Locations, Forces and Meanings" in Caste in Life: Experiencing Inequalities, Eds. D. Shyam Babu and R. S. Khare, Delhi: Pearson, 2011.
- "Changing India-West Cultural Dialectics," New Literary History (Symposium Issue: India and the West). Vol. 40, No. 2, Spring 2009.
- "Anthropology, India and the Academic Self: A Disciplinary Journey between Two Cultures over Four Decades," India Review, Vol. 7, no. 4, 2008.
- "Afterword," in Caste, Hierarchy and Individualism: Indian Critiques of Louis Dumont's Contributions. Ed. R. S. Khare, (Second Paperback Edition). New Delhi: Oxford University Press. 2009.
- "Value Oppositions and Hierarchy: Indian Discussions of Louis Dumont's Works," in Caste, Hierarchy and Individualism: Indian Critiques of Louis Dumont's Contributions. Ed. R. S. Khare, New Delhi: Oxford University Press. 2006.
- "Strands in Cultural Imagination: Interpreting Scholarly Itineraries in Indian Anthropology," XI D. N. Majumdar Memorial Lecture—2004. Eastern Anthropologist, Volume 58, No.1, 2005.
- "ANNA (Food)" in The Hindu World. Eds. Sushil Mittal and Gene Thursby. New York: Routledge. 2004.
- "Dalits and the Indian Constitution at Fifty: Issues in Changing Cultural Identity and Public Debates," in Rights and Privileges: Fifty Years of the Indian Constitution. Eds. Ajit Jain, Jesse S. Palsetia, and N. K. Wagle, (South Asian Studies Papers, No. 15). Toronto: University of Toronto. 2003.
