= Bhagavati =

Honorific title for female deities in Hinduism

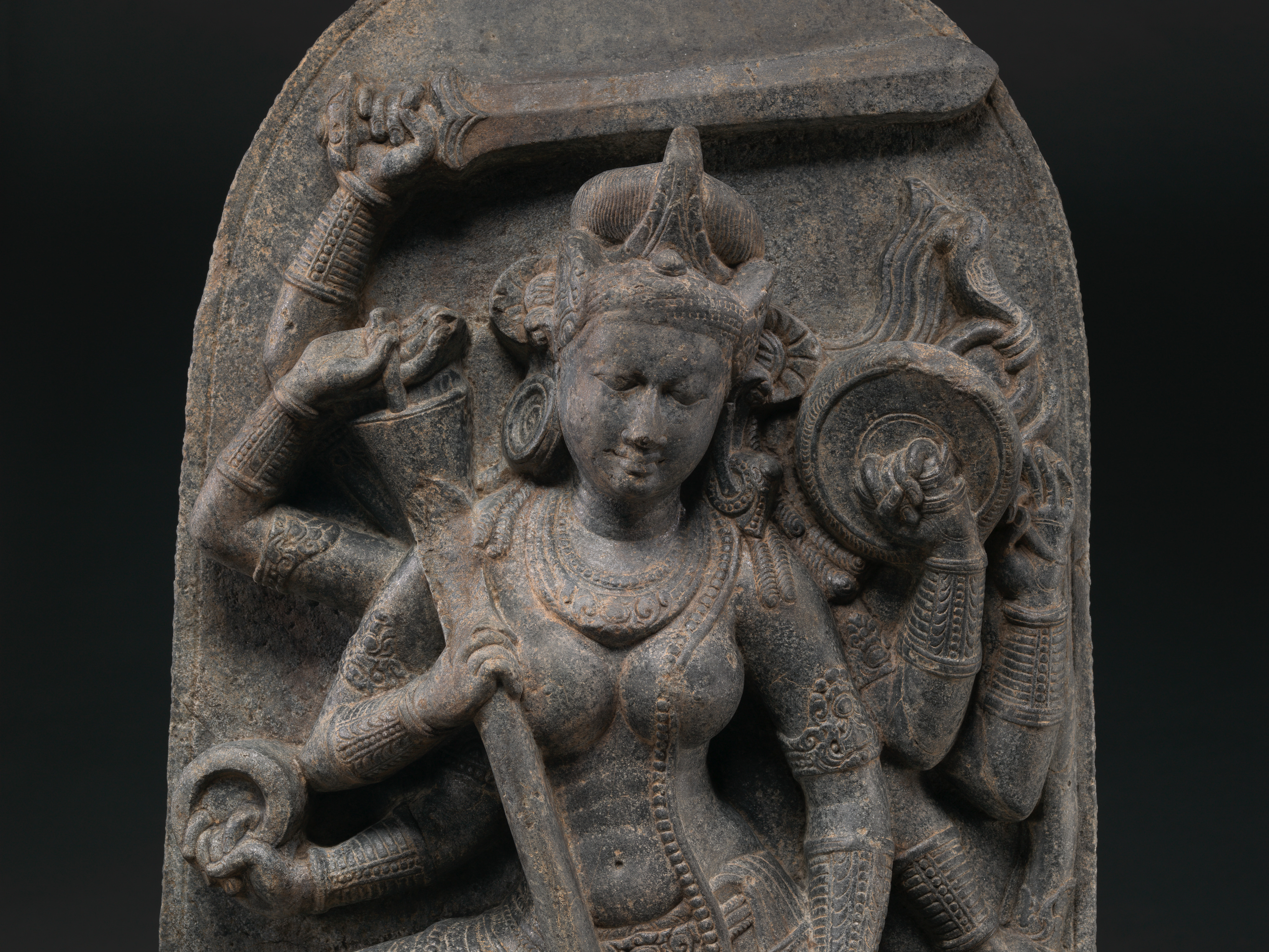
Statue of Durga, one of the primary bearers of the epithet Bhagavati

Bhagavatī (Devanagari: भगवती, IAST: Bhagavatī) is an Indian epithet of Sanskrit origin, used as an honorific title for goddesses in Hinduism, Jainism and Buddhism. In Hinduism, it is primarily used to address the goddesses Sarasvati, Lakshmi and Parvati. In Buddhism, it is used to refer to several Mahayana Buddhist female deities, like Cundā.

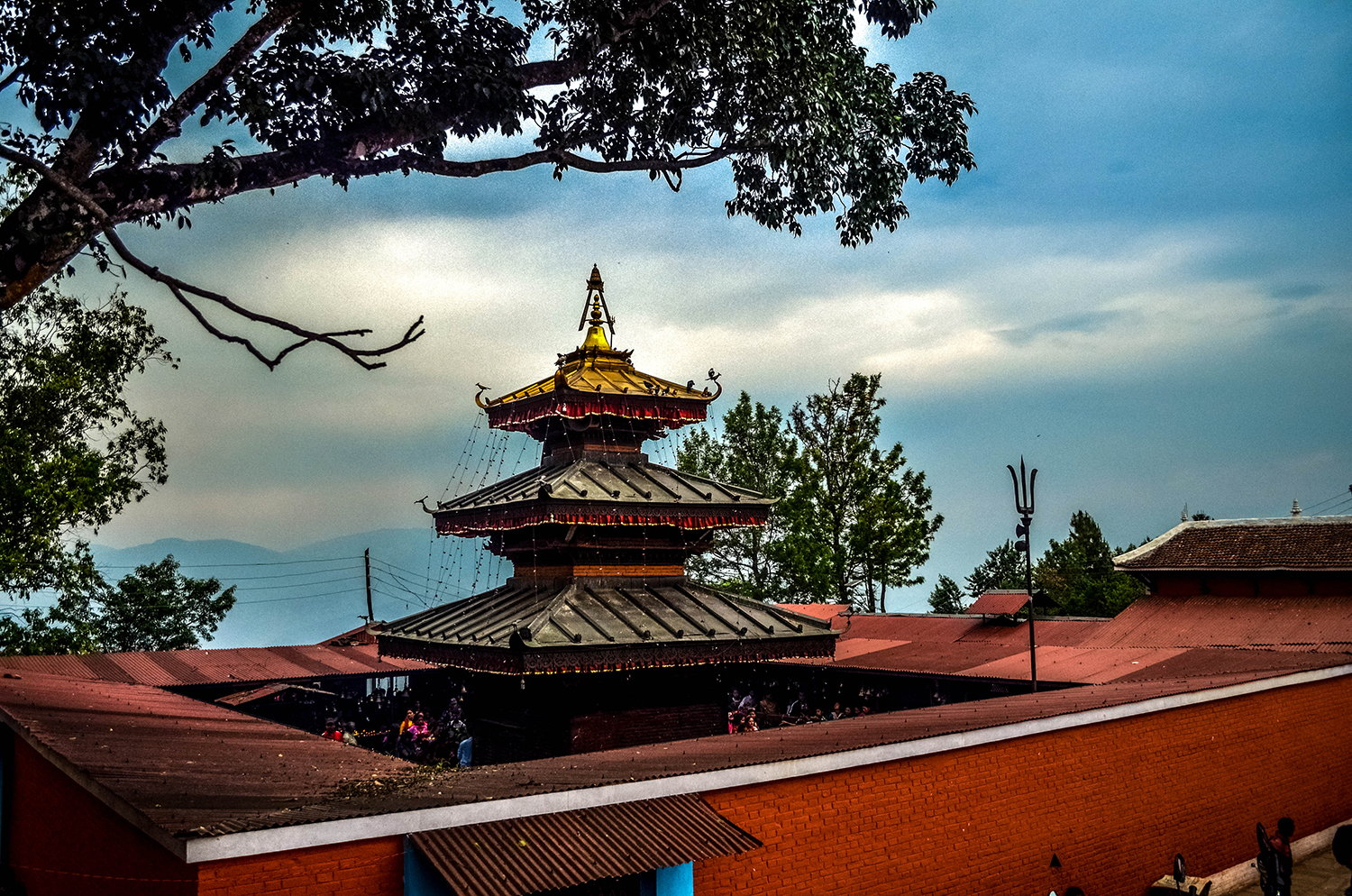
Palanchok Bhagavati, one of the oldest Bhagavati temple of Nepal, from 5th century CE. Here, the goddess is considered the elder sister of all the other Bhagavatis of Nepal

The male equivalent of Bhagavatī is Bhagavān. The term is an equivalent of Devi and Ishvari.

== Bhagavati Temples in Indian subcontinent ==
=== Maharashtra ===
Bhagavati temples can also be found all over Mumbai, for example,

- Bhagavati Devi Sansthan Deosari, Umarkhed, Yavatmal District, Maharashtra.
- Bhagavati temple at Ratnagiri, Maharashtra

Uttar Pradesh

- Bhagawati Temple at Reotipur, Uttar Pradesh.
- Bhagawati Temple at Mirzapur, Uttar Pradesh.

==== Karnataka ====
Bagavathi temple Sasihitlu Mangalore. Famous temple in Karnataka on the bank of Arabian sea. Guliga is the main Daiva here.

Bhagavathi temple in Ullal, Mangalore

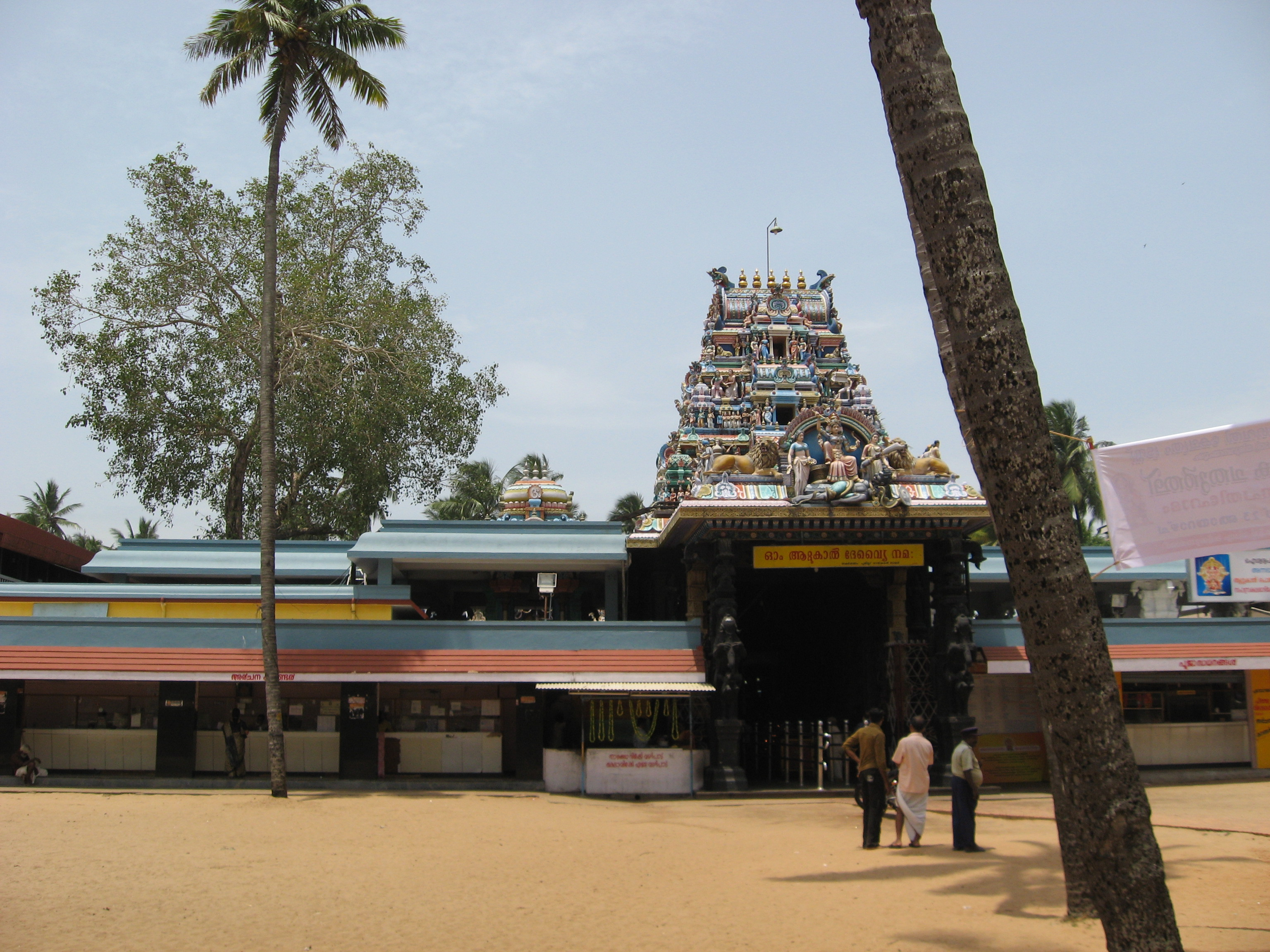
Attukal temple

==== Kerala ====
Shrines of these goddesses are referred to as Bhagavati Kshetram in Kerala. Some popular Bhagavati temples in Kerala are,

1. Attukal Temple
2. Kalluvettu Kuzhikkal Bhagavati Kshetram at Karaparamba, Calicut
3. Punnasseri Bhagavati Kshetram at Athanikkal, Kozhikode.
4. Areekulangara Devi Kshetram at Kattangal-Mavoor Rd., Kozhikode.
5. Chakkulathukavu Temple
6. Chottanikkara Temple
7. Chettikulangara Devi Temple
8. Madayi Kavu
9. Kodungallur Bhagavathy Temple
10. Paramekkavu Bhagavathi Temple, Thrissur
11. Sankarankulangara Bhagavathi Temple, Thrissur
12. Olarikkara Bhagavathi Temple, Thrissur
13. Sree Kattukulangara Bhagavathy Temple, Mampad, Palakkad
14. Meenkulathi Bagavathy Temple, Pallasena, Palakkad
15. Peroor Kavu Bhagavathi
16. Kadampuzha Devi Temple
17. Pisharikavu
18. Kavaserry Bhagavathi Temple
19. Mangottu Bhagavathi Temple
20. Mondaicaud Bhagavathi Temple in Kolachal, Kanyakumari district, Tamil Nadu
21. Lokanarkavu (Lokamalayar kavu) temple in Vatakara, Kozhikode District
22. Kalayamvelli temple, Kozhikode District
23. Uthralikkavu Bhagavati Temple, Thrissur District
24. Shree Sasihithulu Bhagavathee Temple, Haleyangadi, Karnataka
25. Kuttiyankavu Bhagavati Temple, Minalur, Athani, Thrissur District
26. Thechikkotukavu temple, Peramangalam, Thrissur District
27. Thachanaathukaavu temple, Parlikad, Wadakanchery, Trichur District
28. Tiruvaanikkaavu bhagawati temple, Machaad, Wadakanchery, Trichur District
29. Tirumandaamkunnu temple, Angaadipuram, Perinthalmana, Malappuram
30. Kottuvally Kavu Bhagavathy temple, Koonammavu, Ernakulam
31. Sree Emur Bhagavathy Hemambika temple (http://www.sreeemoorbhagavathy.org/about.php), Kallekulangara, Palakkad
32. Kechery Parappukkavu Bhagavathi Temple, Thrissur
33. Mannadikavu VanaDurga Bhagavathy Temple ,Kareelakulangara Kayamkulam

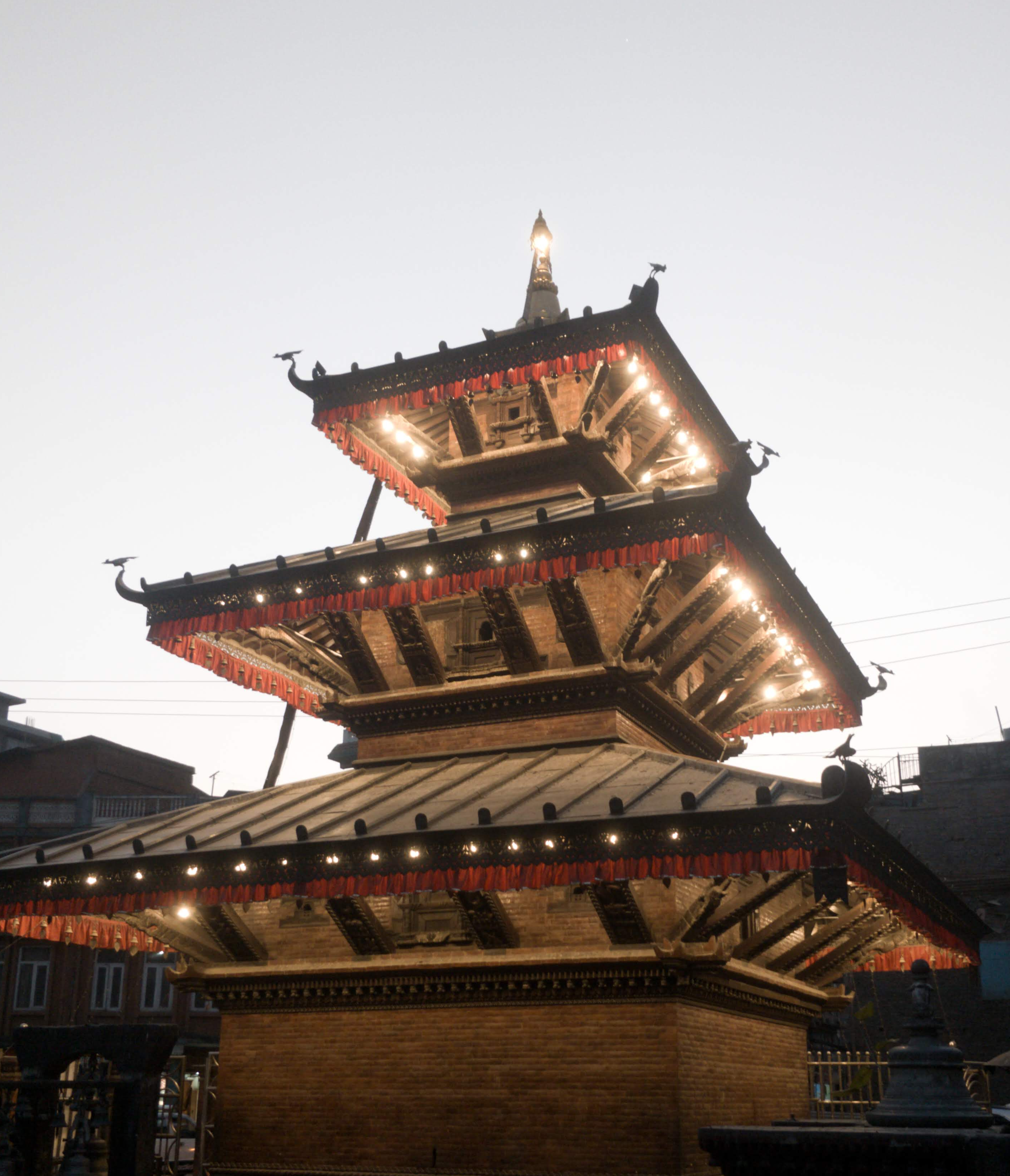
Naxal Bhagwati, Kathmandu

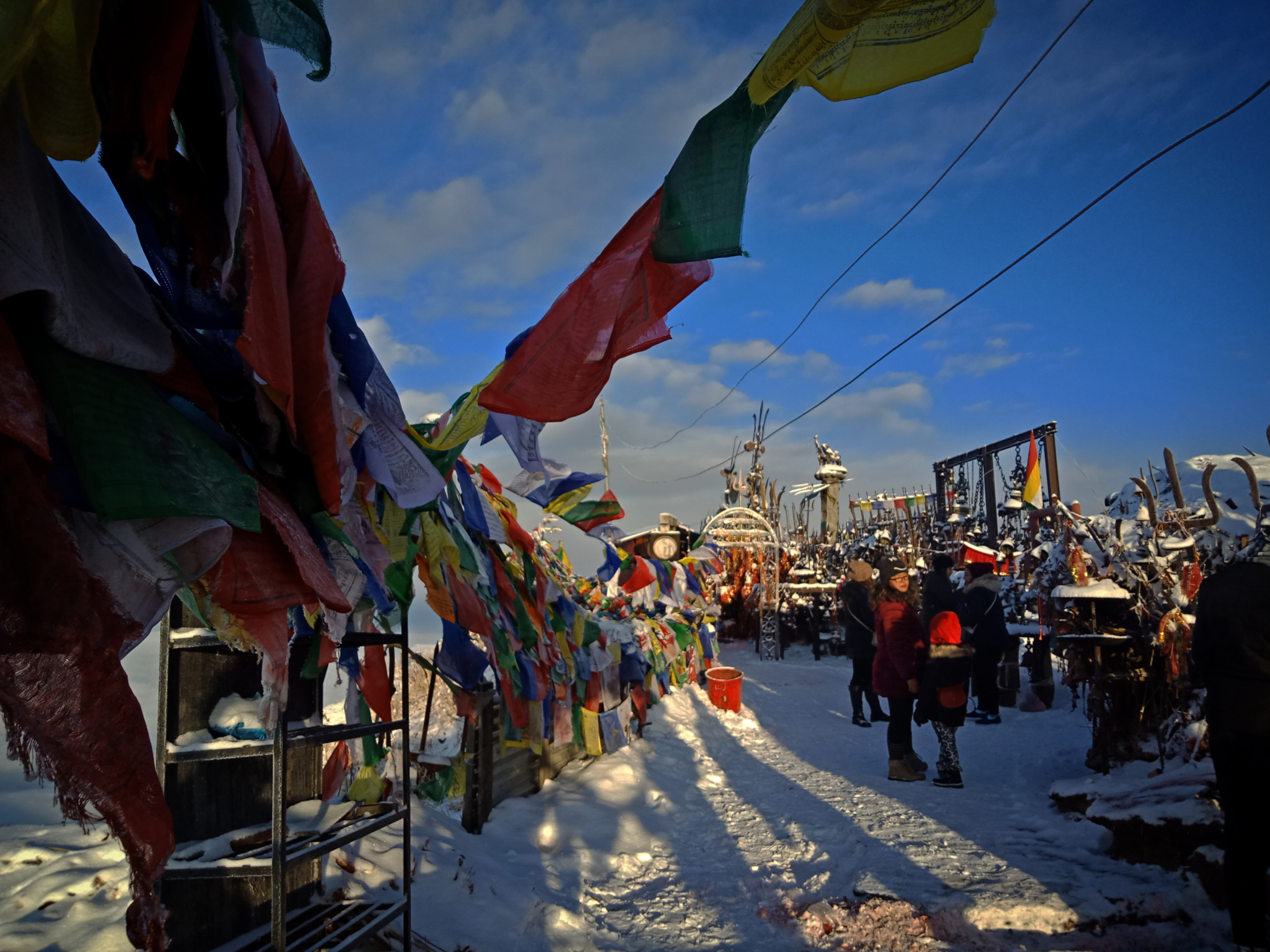
Kalinchowk Bhagwati Temple

==== Goa ====
Many Bhagavati temples are found in Goa, where the deity is mainly worshipped in the form of Mahishasuramardini by the Goud Saraswat Brahmin, Daivadnya Brahmin, Bhandari communities. Bhagavati is also worshipped as one of the Panchayatana deity in most of the Goan temples. Shrines specially dedicated to Bhagavati are:

- Bhagavati (Pernem)
- Bhagavati Haldonknarin (Khandola, Goa)
- Bhagavati Chimulakarin (Marcela, Goa)
- Bhagavati (Parse, Goa)
- Bhagavati (Mulgao, Goa)
- Dhavali, Bhagavati temple

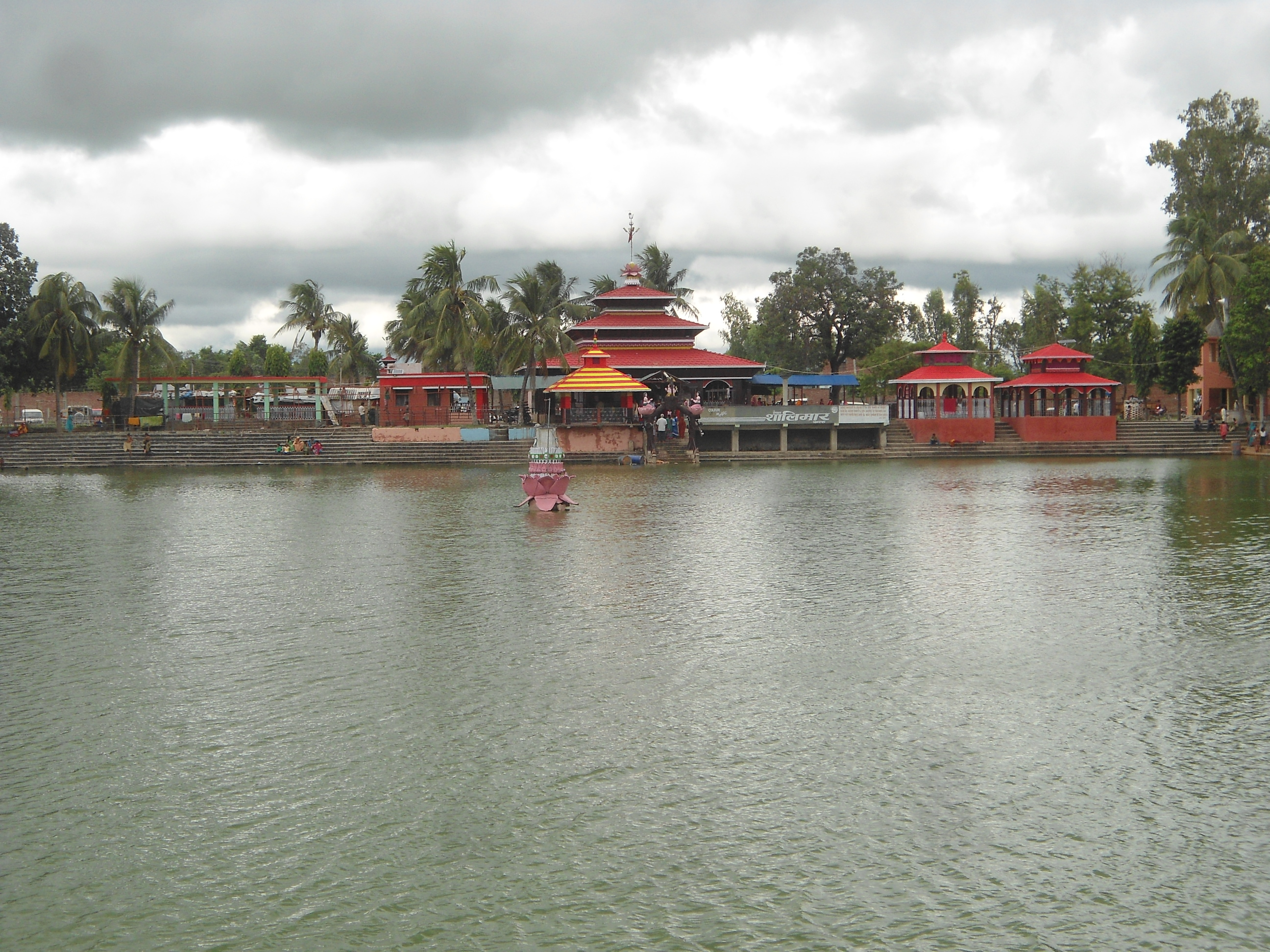
Chinnamasta Bhagawati Temple, Nepal

=== Nepal ===
- Shobha Bhagawati(शोभा भगवती मन्दिर), Kathmandu
- Naxal Bhagawati Temple, Kathmandu
- Chinnamasta Bhagawati Temple, Saptari District, Nepal
- Palanchok Bhagawati Temple, Kavrepalanchok District
- Kalinchowk Bhagwati Temple, Kalinchowk Rural Municipality
- Bhagwati Bahal Temple (भगवती बाहल मन्दिर), Thamel, Kathmandu
- Bindhyabasini Temple, Pokhara
- Argha Bhagwati temple, Arghakhanchi District
- Taleju, Hanumand Dhokha, Kathmandu
- Taleju, Patan
- Taleju, Bhaktapur
- Bhadrakali
- Rana Ujeshwori Bhagwati Temple, Tansen, Palpa

=== Mithila ===
In the Mithila region of the Indian subcontinent, the temple of the Goddess Bhagawati is known as Maharani Sthan. It is often found in the every villages of the region.

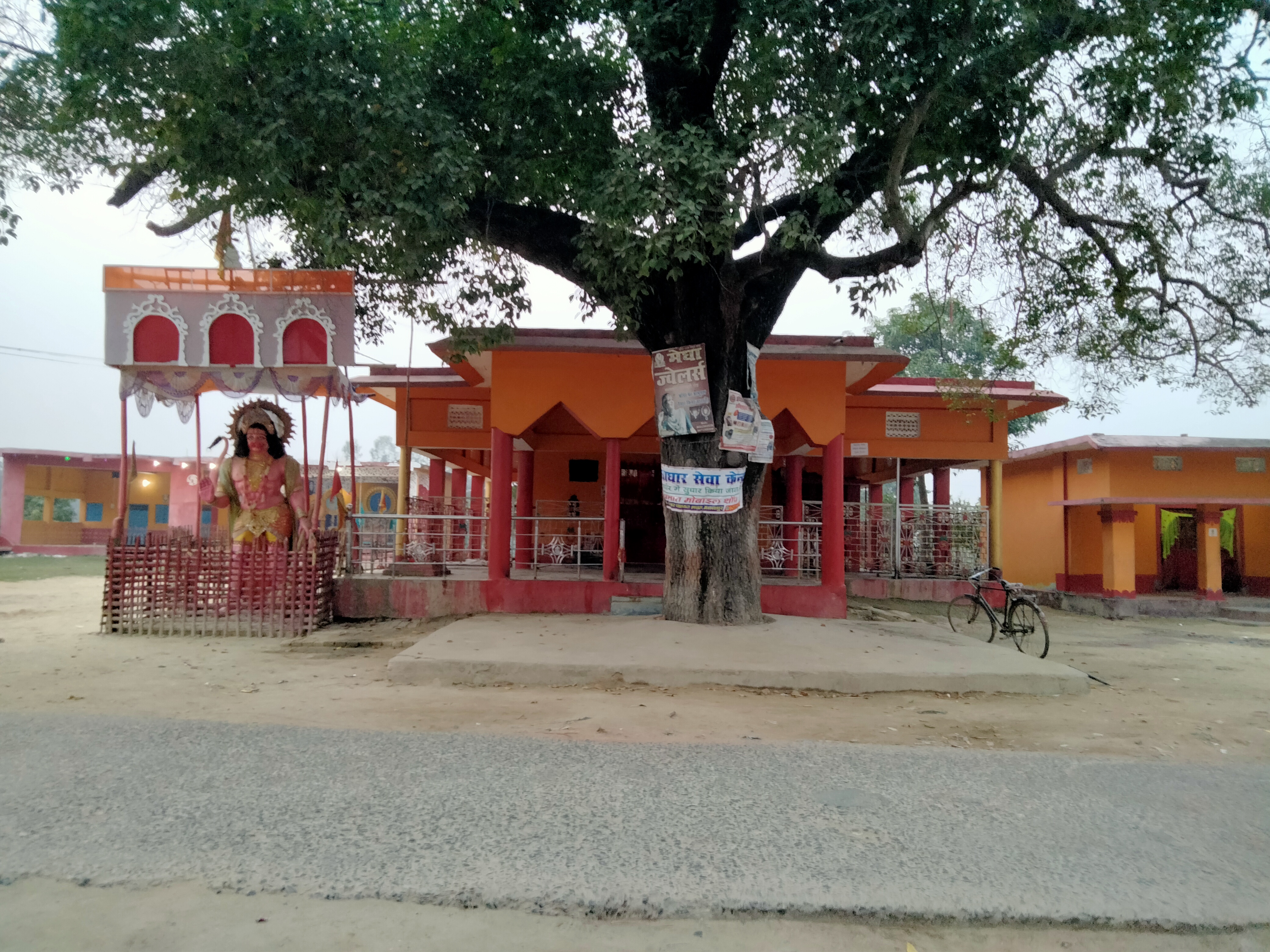
Maharani Sthan Mandir at Basuki Bihari in the Mithila region

- Uchchaith Bhagawati Mandir
- Girija Sthan Mandir, Phulhar
- Rajdevi Mandir, Janakpur

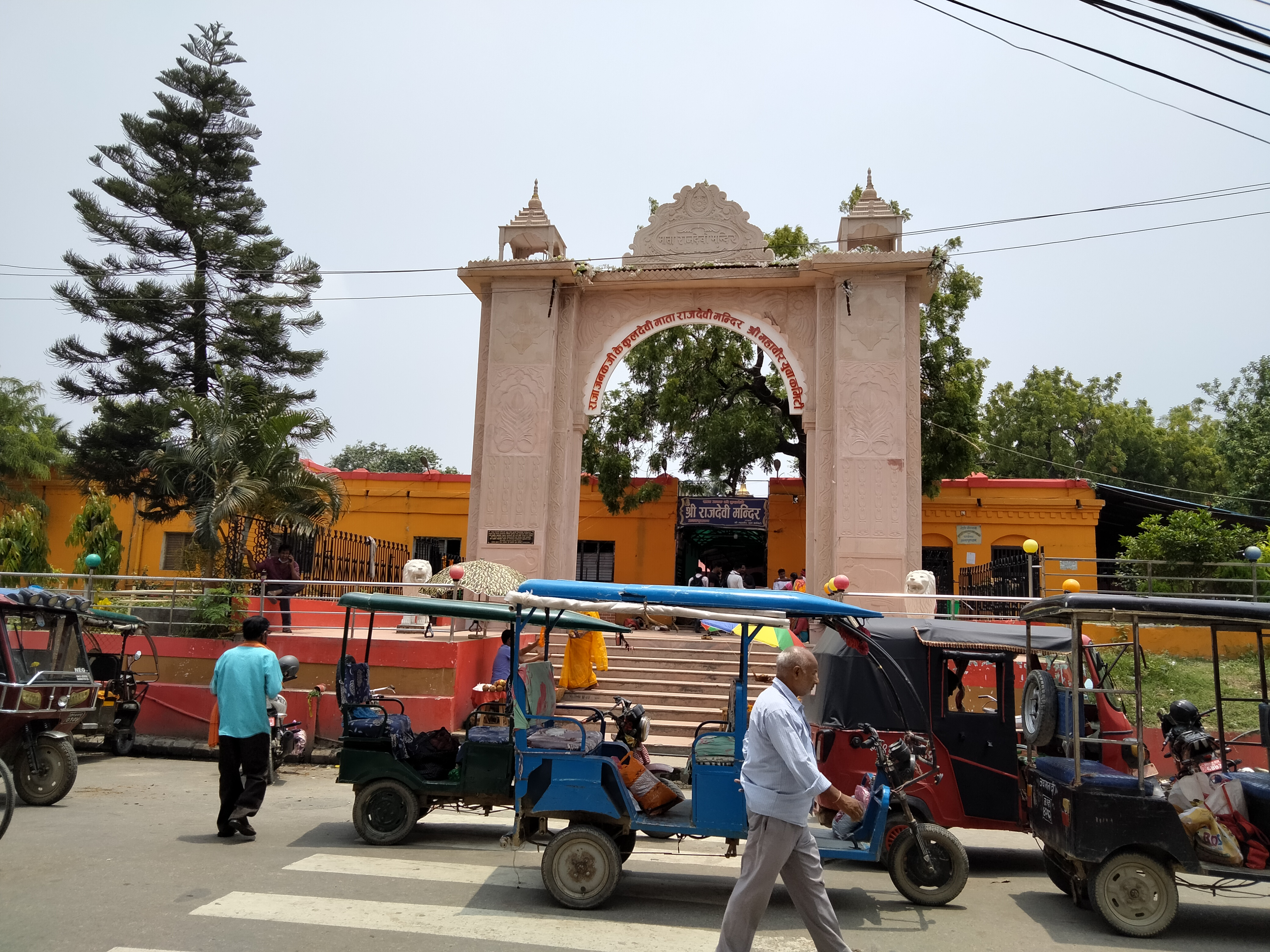
Rajdevi Mata Mandir in the city of Janakpur

== See also ==
- Ishvari
- Bhagavan
- Devi
