= Smriti Senchuri =

Nepalese Politician

The Honourable Smriti Senchuri
- स्मृति सेन्चुरी

Member of Parliament, Pratinidhi Sabha
- Incumbent
- Assumed office 27 March 2026
- Constituency: PR

Personal details
- Born: March 20, 1999 (age 27) Kalinchowk, Dolakha district, Nepal
- Citizenship: Nepali
- Party: Rastriya Swatantra Party (since 2022)
- Parents: Jay Man Kami (father); Gyanu Maya B.K. (mother)
- Education: Master's degree (Tribhuvan University)
- Profession: Politician; Social Activist

Smriti Senchuri (Nepali: स्मृति सेन्चुरी) is a Nepalese politician and social activist who is member of the 7th Pratinidhi Sabha. She joined Rastriya Swatantra Party in 2022. She was elected through proportional representation under the Dalit female cluster.

== Early life and education ==
Senchuri was born in a Dalit Thami family in Lamidanda, Dolakha, now Kalinchowk, Dolakha district, Bagmati Province, Nepal, on March 20, 1999. She is a daughter of Jay Man Kami and Gyanu Maya B.K.. At the age of two, she lost her mother, and her father arranged her upbringing and schooling. She passed the SEE at Bhagwati Secondary School in Kalinchowk. She moved to Kathmandu Valley for higher education. She completed her bachelor’s degree and master's degree from Tribhuvan University in Kathmandu.

== Political career ==
She joined the Rastriya Swatantra Party in 2022, while studying for her bachelor's degree. She was nominated as a proportional representative member of parliament from the Rastriya Swatantra Party in the 2026 Nepalese general election. She is now a member of the Law, Justice and Human Rights parliamentary committee for the Rastriya Swatantra Party in the Pratinidhi Sabha since April 2026.
