= List of ski areas and resorts in Nepal =

Despite having the highest mountains in the world, there has historically been little skiing culture in Nepal. In 2019 it was reported that the country was planning to build its first ski resort, in Kuri.

- Api Base
- Dhorpatan Park
- Everest Base
- Gaurisankhar Base
- Jugal Base
- Kanchjunga Base
- Khaptad Region
- Lhotse Base
- Manaslu Base
- Nuptse Base
- Saipal Base
- Many glaciers of the country
