= Lamidanda =

Lamidanda may refer to the following places in Nepal:

- Lamidanda, Khotang
- Lamidanda, Dolakha
- Lamidanda in Kavrepalanchok District, a stop on the Araniko Highway
