= Thangmi =

Thangmi may refer to:

- Thami, an ethnic group of Nepal and India
- Thangmi language, their Sino-Tibetan language
