= Kalinchowk Rural Municipality =

Kalinchowk Rural Municipality कालिन्चोक गाउँपालिका
- Rural Municipality
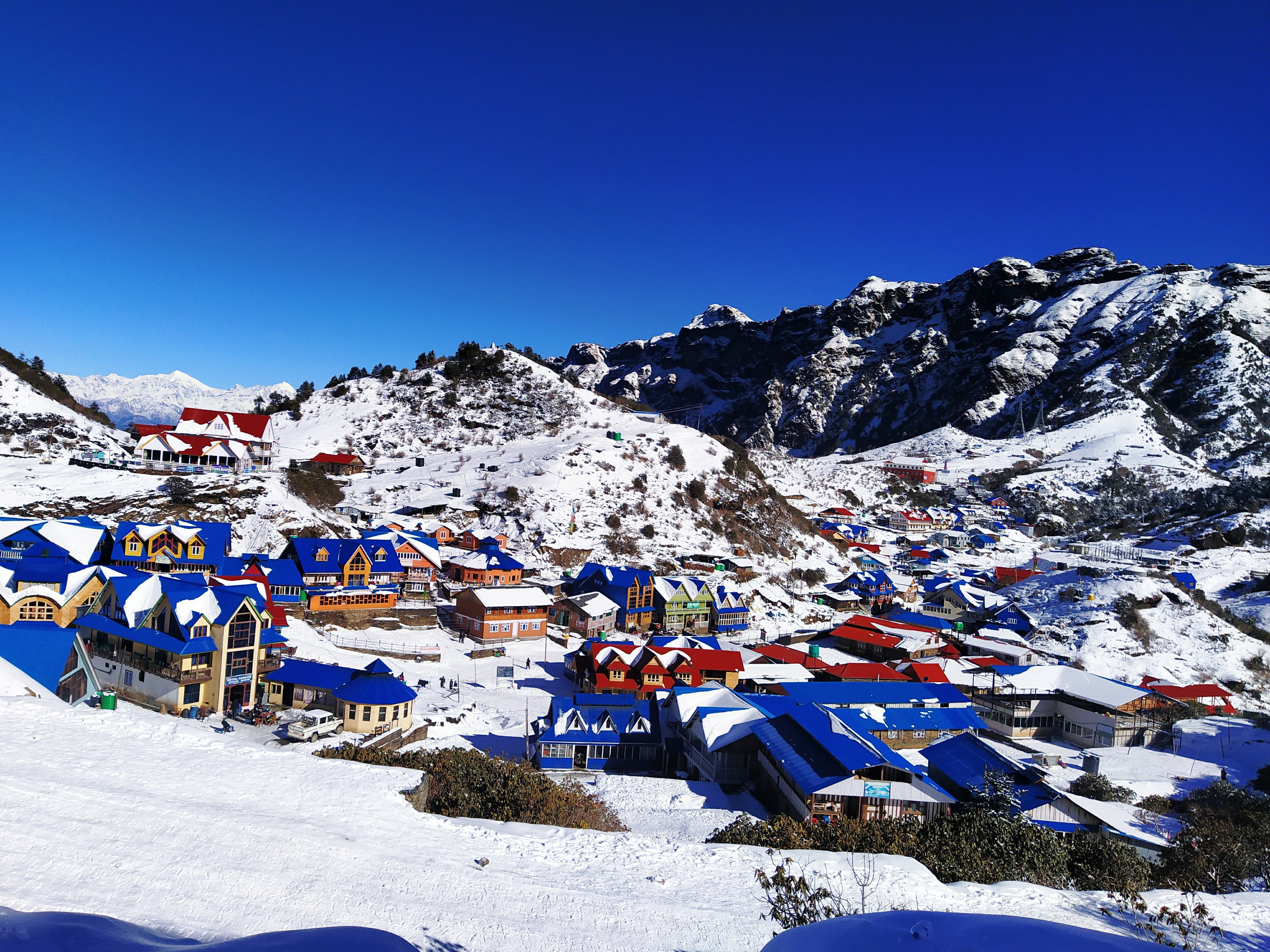
- Kuri village, an touristic village near to Kalinchowk Bhagwati Temple
- Interactive map of Kalinchowk Rural Municipality
- Country: Nepal
- Province: Bagmati
- District: Dolakha
- Wards: 9
- Established: 10 March 2017

Government
  - Type: Local Government
  - Chairperson: Mr. Arjun Prashad Shiwakoti (Nepali Congress)
  - Vice-Chairperson: Mr. Kul Bahadur Budathoki

Area
  - Total: 132.49 km^{2} (51.15 sq mi)

Population (2011)
  - Total: 22,954
  - Density: 173.25/km^{2} (448.72/sq mi)
- Time zone: UTC+5:45 (Nepal Standard Time)
- Postal Code: 45500
- Area code: +977
- Website: kalinchowkmun.gov.np

Kalinchowk is a Rural municipality located within the Dolakha district of the Bagmati province of Nepal. The municipality spans 132.49 square kilometres (51.15 sq mi) of area, with a total population of 22,954 according to a 2011 Nepal census.

On March 10, 2017, the Government of Nepal restructured the local level bodies into 753 new local level structures. The previous Kalinchowk, Babare, Lamidanda, Lapilang, Sunakhani, and Sundrawati VDCs were merged to form Kalinchowk Rural Municipality. Kalinchowk is divided into 9 wards, with Sunakhani declared the administrative center of the rural municipality.

Kalinchowk is a hill station and a tourist hotspot. It is located at 3842 meters of altitude and about 150km northeast from national capital Kathmandu. The place is best known for trekking and skiing. During the December, January and February (mainly Paush and Magh in Nepali months) snowfalls in Kalinchowk.

== Demographics ==
At the time of the 2011 Nepal census, Kalinchowk Rural Municipality had a population of 22,954. Of these, 60.2% spoke Nepali, 34.0% Thangmi, 3.9% Tamang, 1.0% Newar, 0.5% Sherpa, 0.1% Magar, 0.1% Maithili, 0.1% Majhi and 0.1% other languages as their first language.

In terms of ethnicity/caste, 36.7% were Thami, 35.8% Chhetri, 13.2% Hill Brahmin, 4.0% Tamang, 3.0% Newar, 1.9% Damai/Dholi, 1.9% Kami, 1.2% Sarki, 0.6% Majhi, 0.5% Sherpa, 0.3% Magar, 0.3% Thakuri, 0.2% Gharti/Bhujel, 0.1% Badi, 0.1% Terai Brahmin, 0.1% Sunuwar and 0.3% others.

In terms of religion, 69.7% were Hindu, 24.0% Prakriti, 4.5% Buddhist, 1.6% Christian and 0.1% others.

In terms of literacy, 62.6% could read and write, 2.7% could only read and 34.3% could neither read nor write.

== Kalinchowk VDC ==
Kalinchowk is now a neighborhood (village) within Kalinchowk Rural Municipality. It was a separate village development committee (VDC) from 1990 to 2017. Kalinchowk village had 38.19 square kilometres (14.75 sq mi) of area and population according to 2011 had 2806 with 458 individual households. This whole village is now a ward (ward no. 1) of Kalinchowk RM.

== Ward division ==
Kalinchowk RM divided into 9 wards as below:

Kalinchowk RM
Village	Ward no.	area (KM^{2})	population (2011)
Kalinchowk	1	38.19	2,806
Babare	2	16.67	3,533
Lamidanda	3	5.82	1,888
Lamidanda	4	7.93	2,344
Lapilang	5	8.96	2,248
Lapilang	6	24.36	2,694
Sunakhani	7	9.93	2,369
Sunakhani	8	8.23	2,306
Sundrawati	9	12.4	2,766
Kalinchowk RM	9	132.49	22,954

== Photo gallery ==
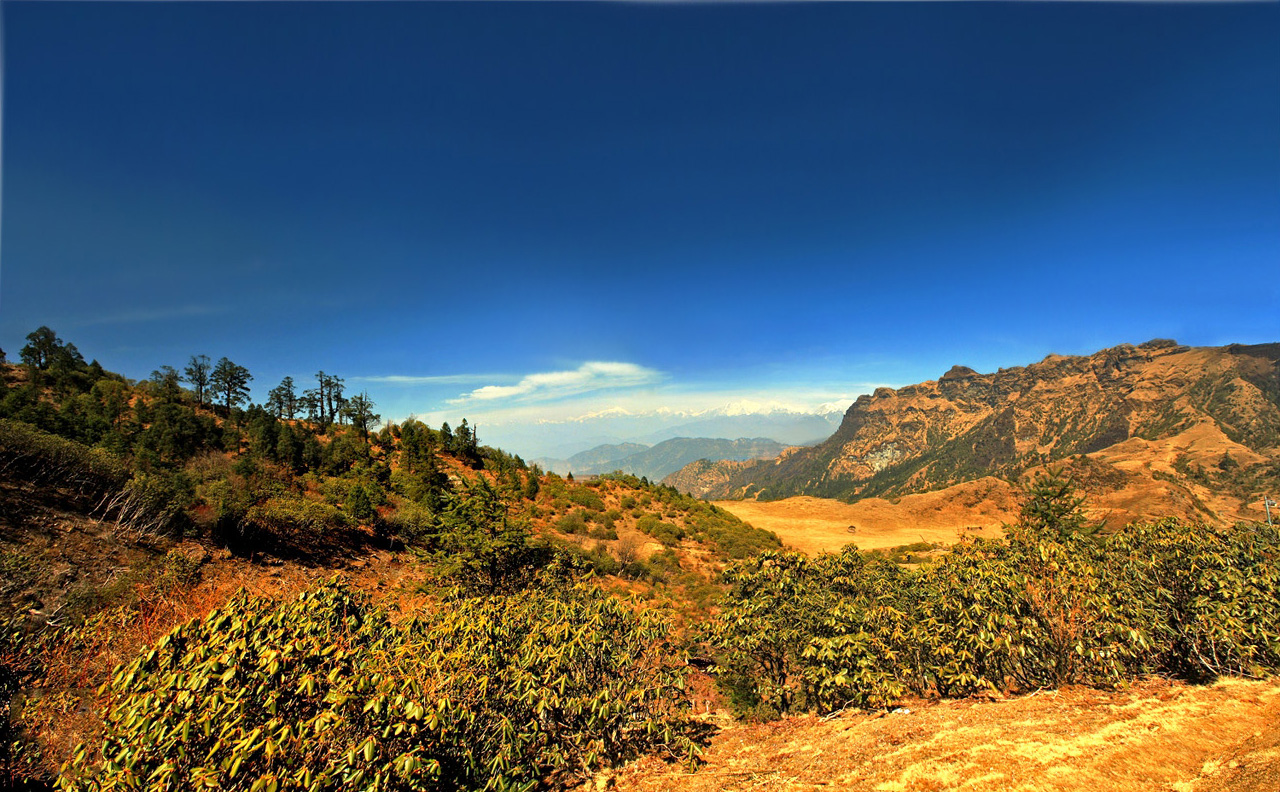
Kalinchowk landscape

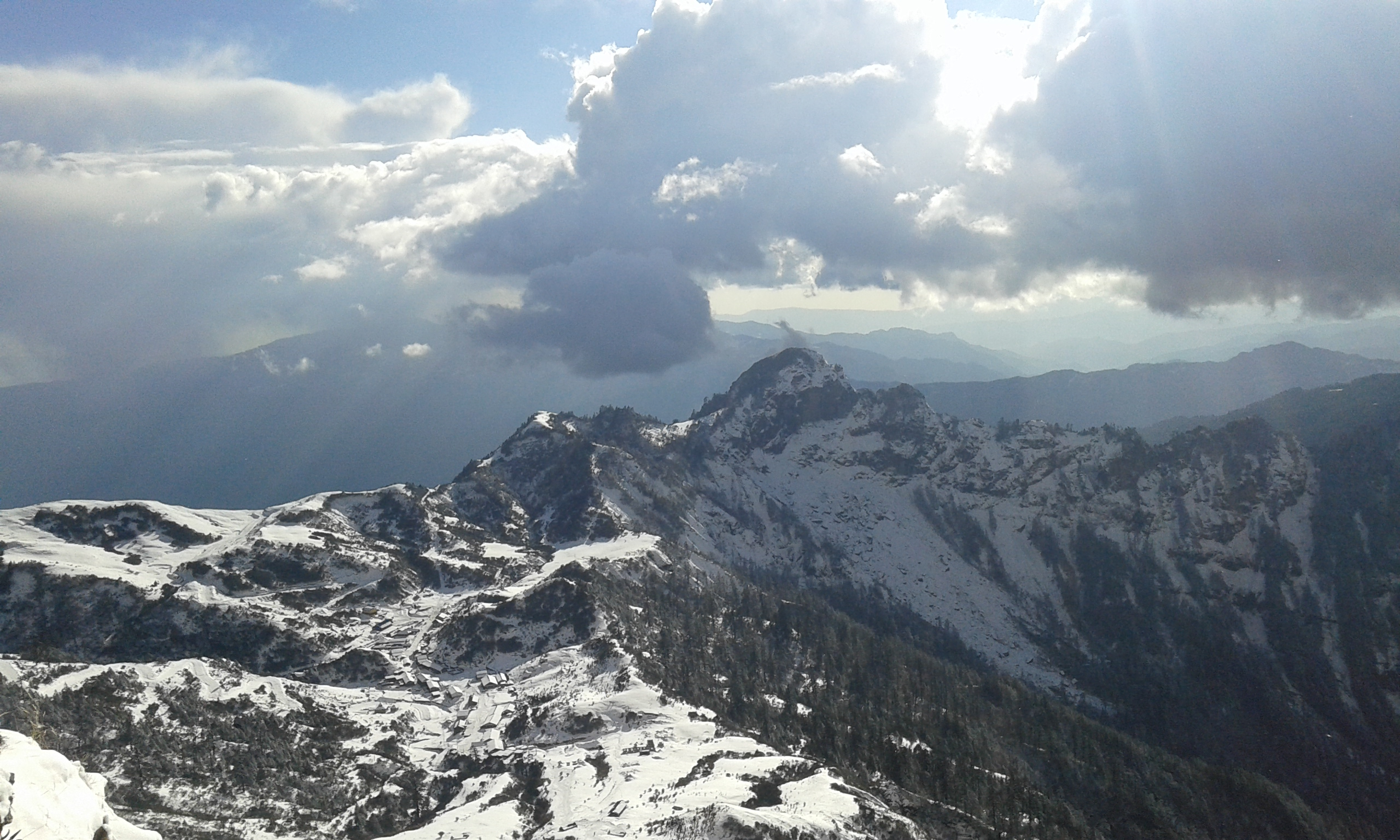
Kalinchowk view

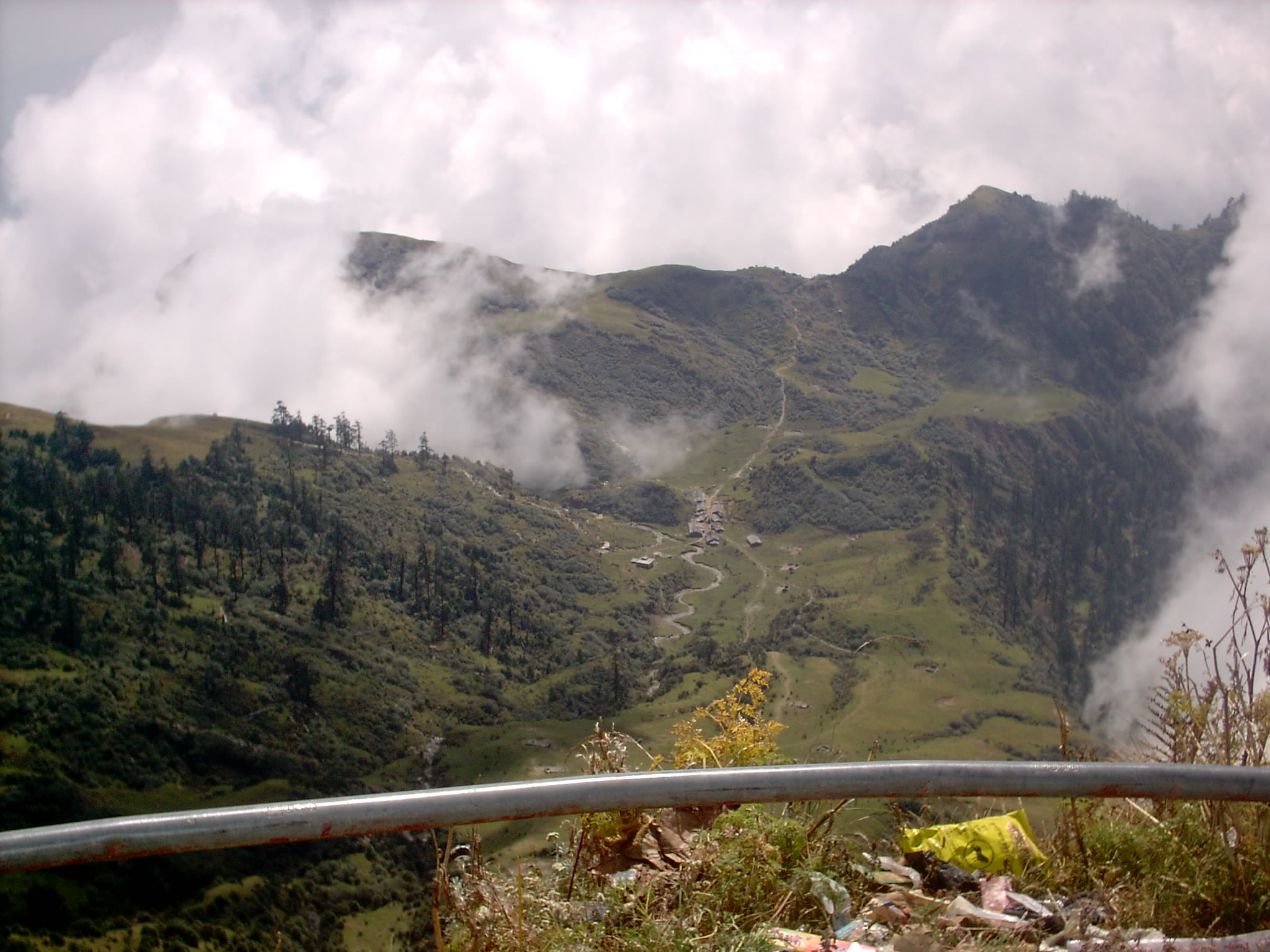
Kalinchowk in 2061 BS (2004–2005)

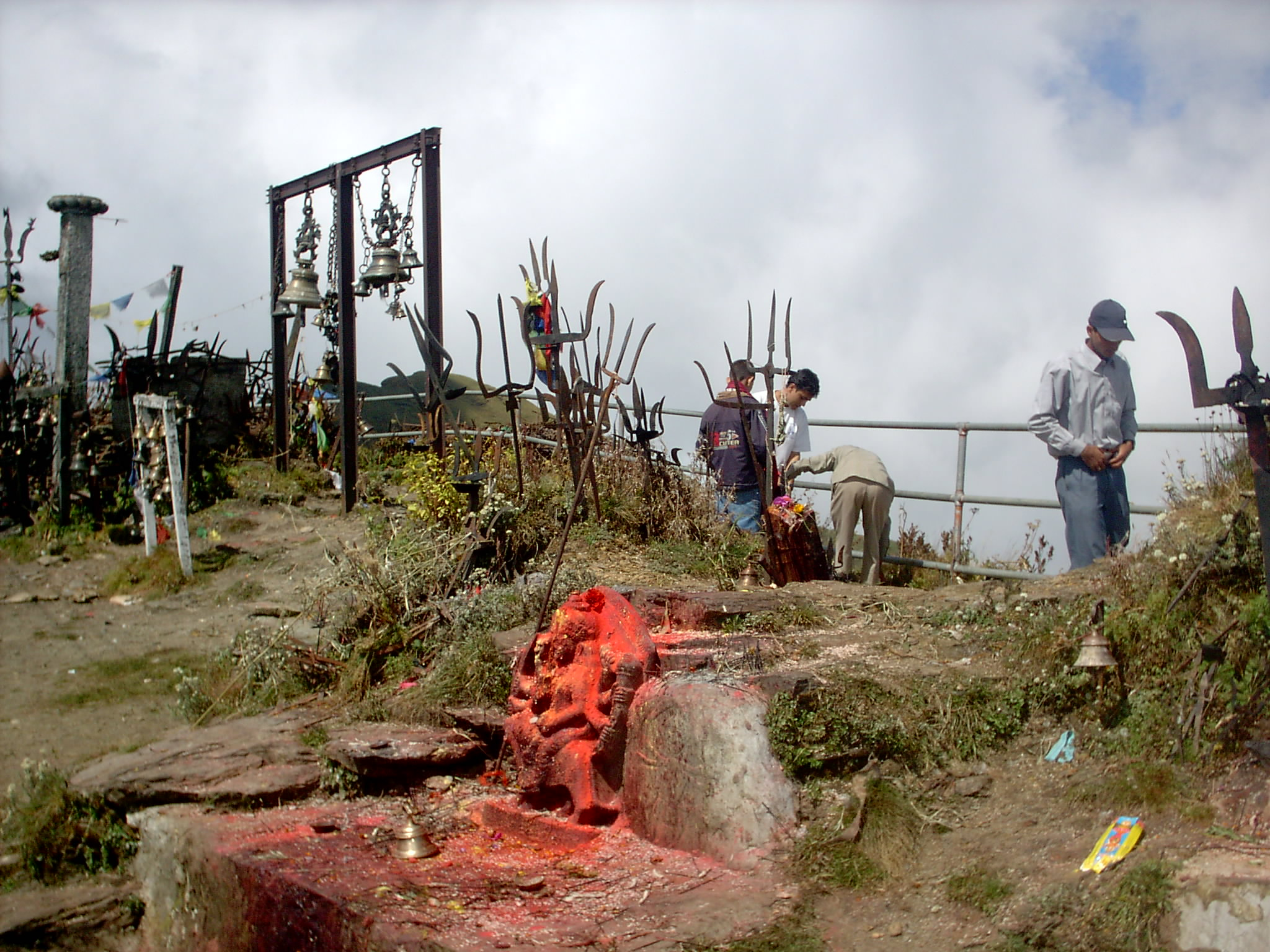
Kalinchowk Bhagwati Temple

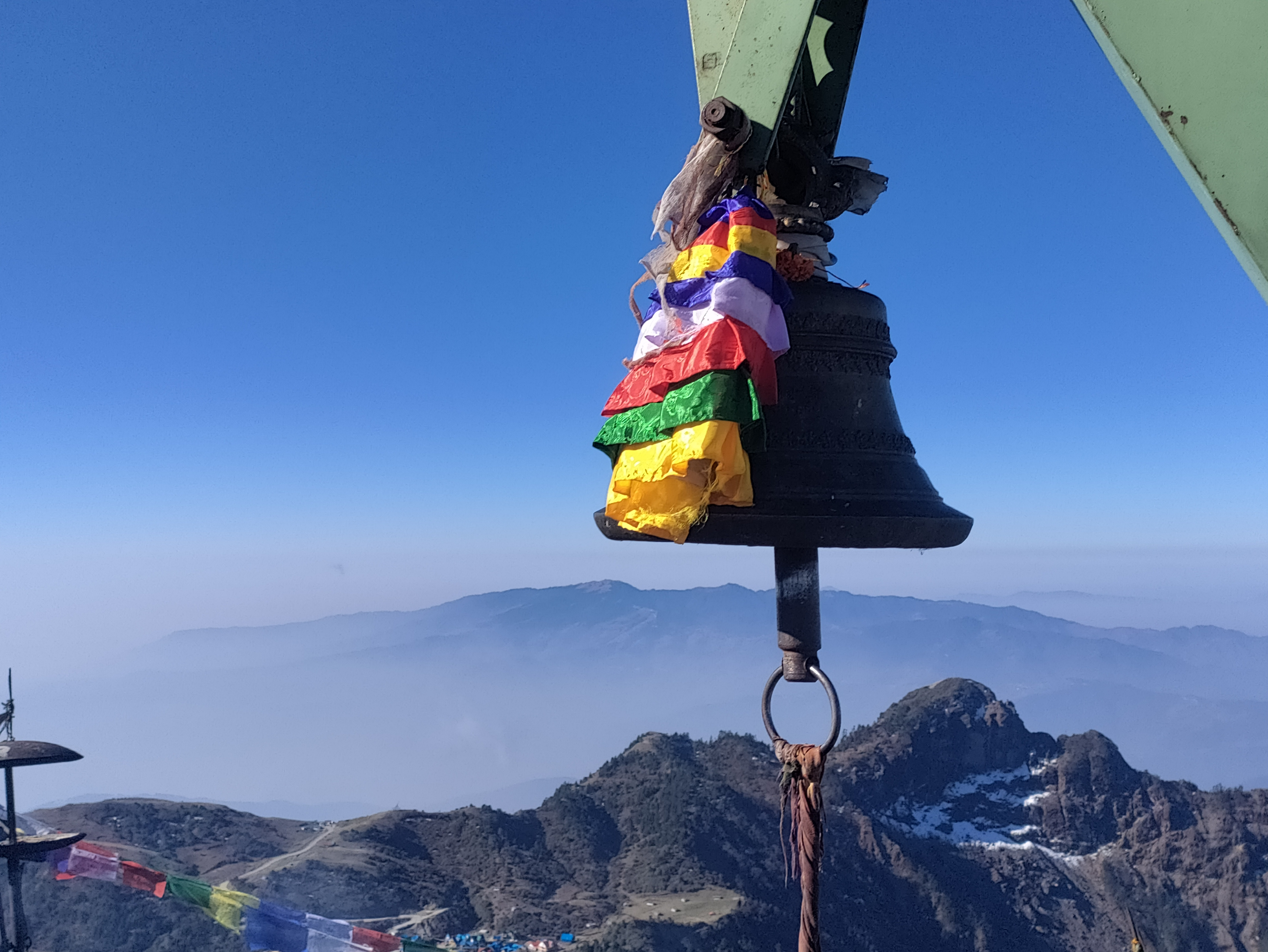
Bell at Kalinchowk Bhagwati Temple

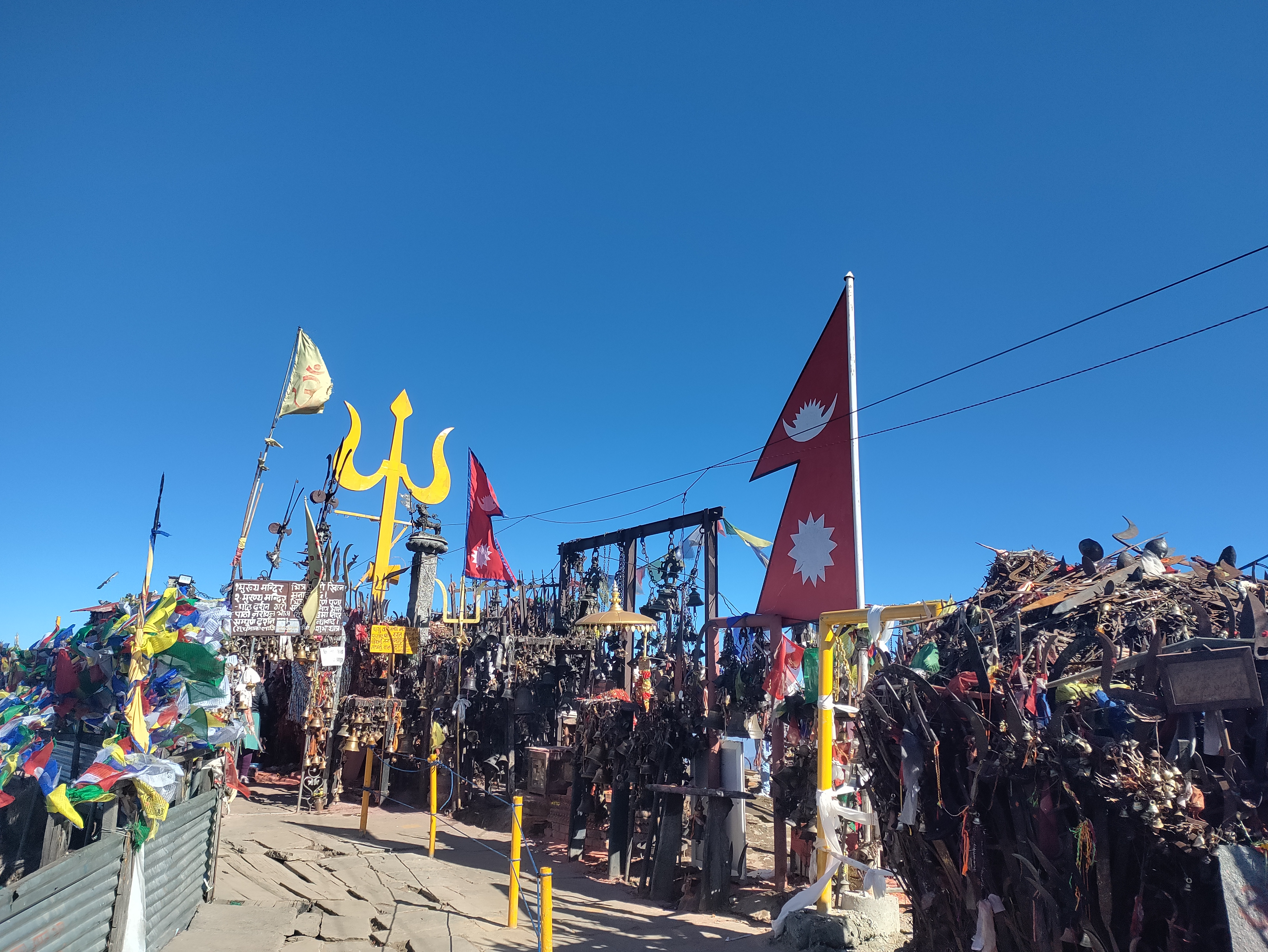
Kalinchowk Bhagawati temple2079 BS (2022–2023)

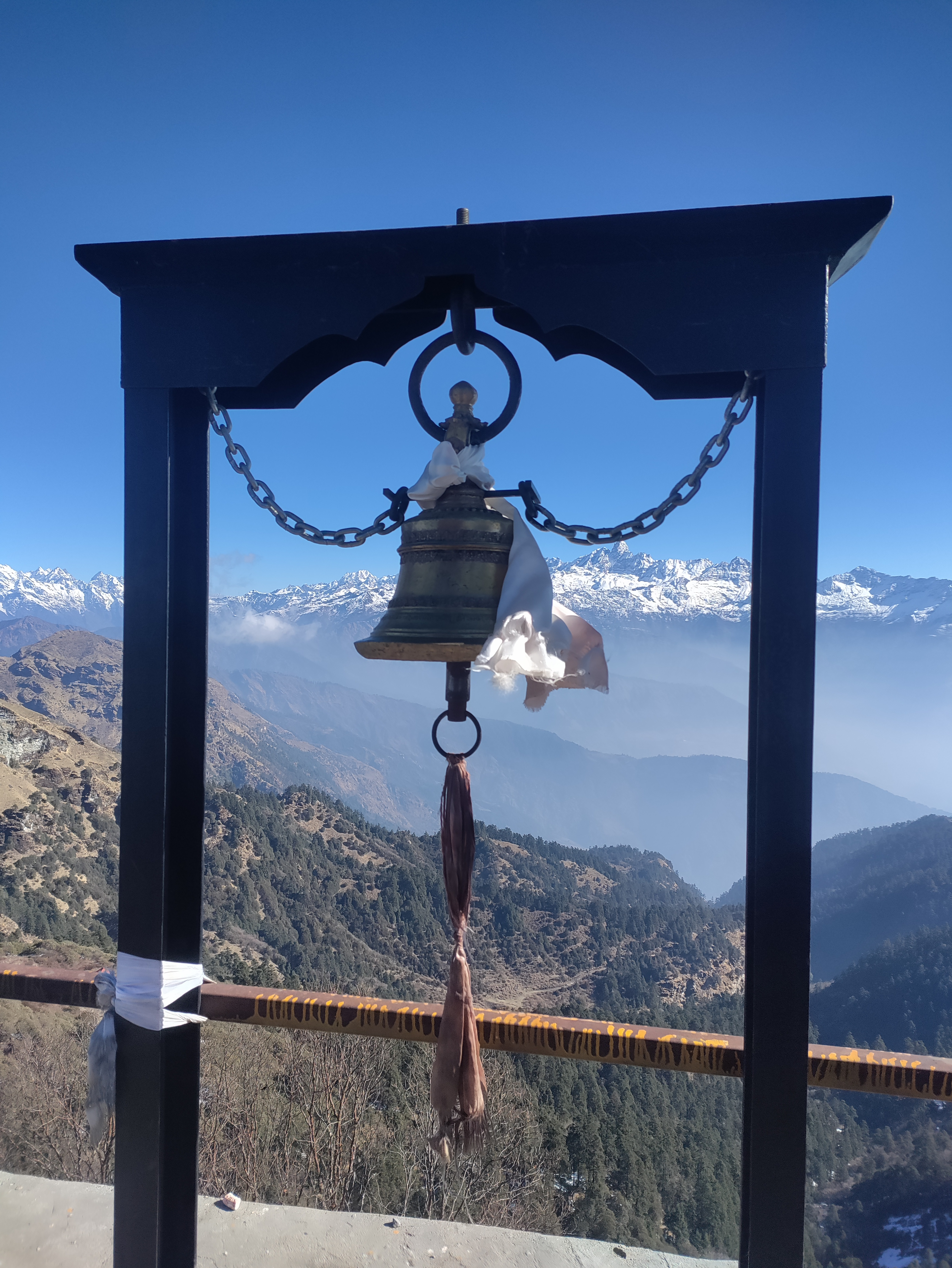
Bell and Himalaya's view from Kalinchowk Bhagawati temple

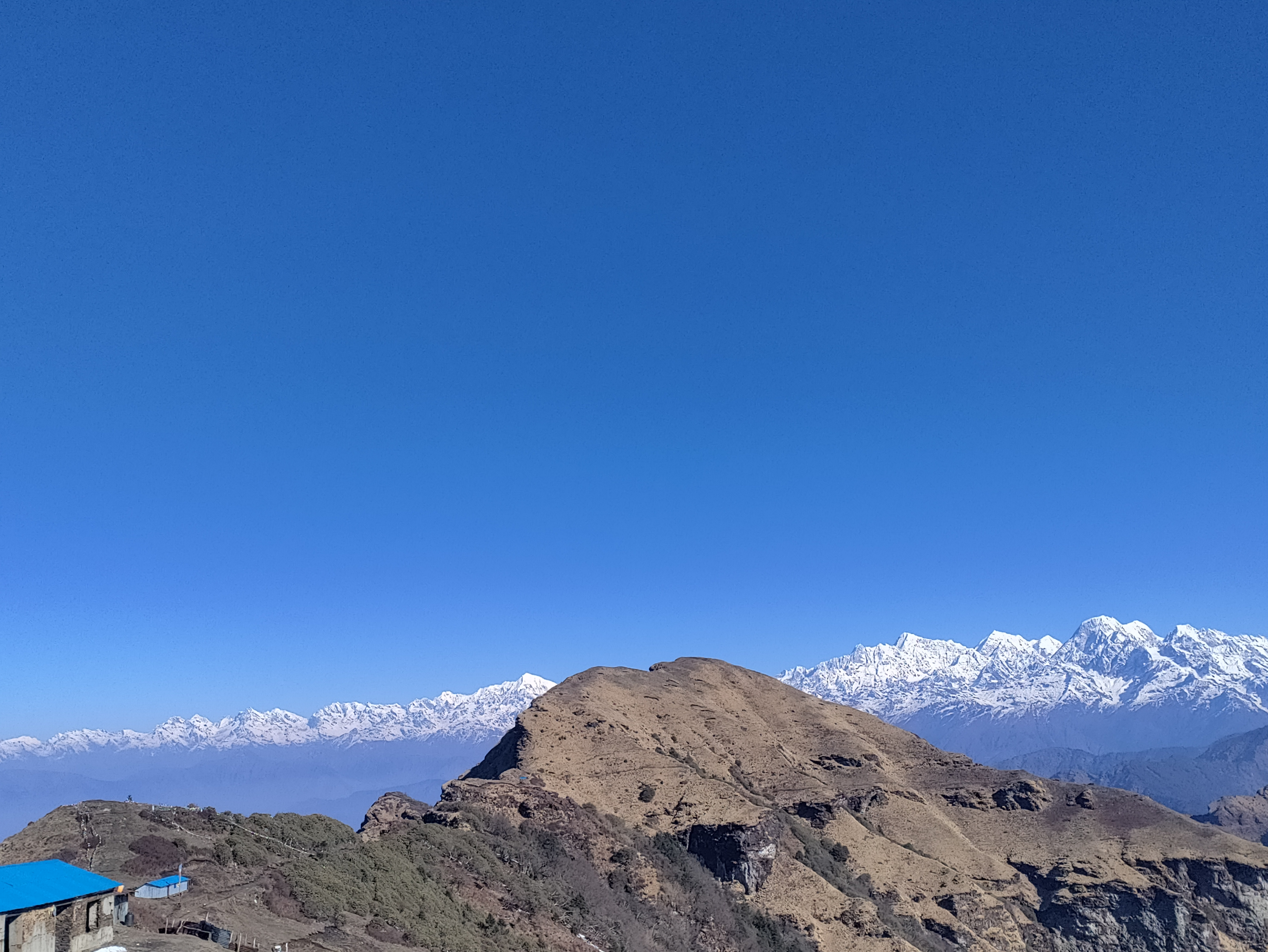
Himalaya view from Kalinchowk Bhagawati temple.

== See also ==
- Kalinchowk Bhagwati Shrine
