= Thangmi language =

Sino-Tibetan language of Nepal and India

Thangmi
- Thāmī, Thangmi Khan, Thani
- Thangmi Kham and Thangmi Wakhe
- Pronunciation: thang-mi
- Region: Nepal and India
- Ethnicity: Thami
- Native speakers: 23,200 (2011 census)
- Language family: Sino-Tibetan: Newaric; Baram–Thangmi; Thangmi
- Dialects: Dolakha; Sindhupalcok

Language codes
- ISO 639-3: thf
- Glottolog: than1259
- ELP: Thangmi

Thangmi, also called Thāmī, Thangmi Kham, Thangmi Wakhe, and Thani, is a Sino-Tibetan language spoken in central-eastern Nepal and northeastern India by the Thami people. The Thami refer to their language as Thangmi Kham or Thangmi Wakhe while the rest of Nepal refers to it as Thāmī. The majority of these speakers, however, live in Nepal in their traditional homeland of Dolakhā District. In India, the Thami population is concentrated mostly in Darjeeling. The Thangmi language is written using the Devanagari script. Thangmi has been extensively documented by Mark Turin.

== Distribution ==
Thangmi is spoken in Bagmati Province, mainly in the region of Dolakha; villages on Sailung Khola (The northern panhandle of the Ramechhap District; mainly in Gokulganga); eastern regions of Sindhupalchowk District; and by some elders among the population who migrated to the cities in the Kathmandu Valley.

Very few ethnic Thami outside Dolakha and Sindhupalcok districts speak Thangmi.

== Classification ==
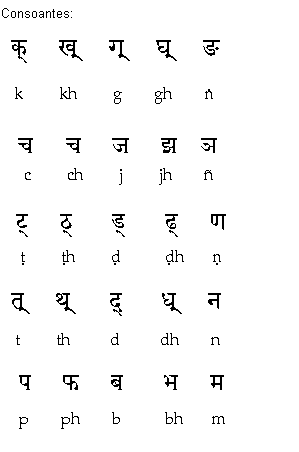
Devanagari is the script that the Thangmi language uses.

The Thangmi language seems to have many similarities with other languages in Nepal. For example, Barām, Kiranti and Newar. Studies from Konow (1909), Shafer (1966), Stein (1970), Toba (1990), van Driem (1992) and Turin demonstrate that Thangmi is closely related to the Rai and Newar languages.

== Grammar ==
Thangmi	English	Pronoun
gai	I	first person singular
ni	we	first person plural
	you	second person singular
	you	second person plural
to	he, she, it	third person singular
	they	third person plural

== Dialects ==
=== Dolakhā vs. Sindhupālchok ===
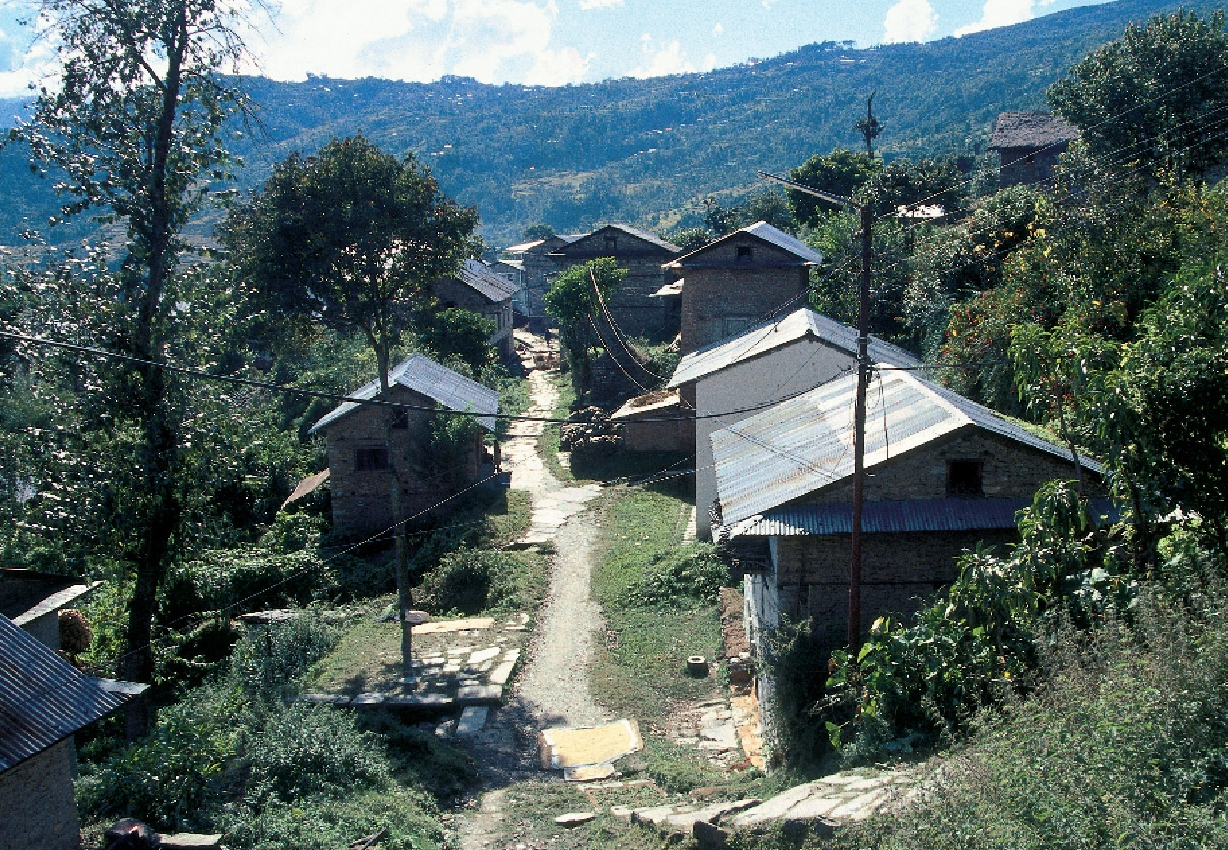
Dolakha, Nepal

Thangmi consists of two dialects, Dolakhā (East) and Sindhupālchok (West). They differ in terms of phonology, nominal, and verbal morphology and in lexicon. The majority of the Thangmi speaking population use the Dolakhā dialect while only a handful speak in Sindhupālcok. The Dolakhā dialect offers a more complete verbal agreement system while the Sindhupālcok dialect has a more complex nominal morphology.

Kinship
English	Dolakhā	Sindhupālchok
younger brother	hu	calaca hu
younger sister	humi	camaica hu
father's eldest brother	jekhapa	jhya?apa
father's younger brother	ucyapa	pacyu
father's eldest sister	nini	jhya?ama
father's younger sister	nini	nini
mother's eldest brother	palam	palam
mother's younger brother	malam	mou
mother's eldest sister	jekhama	jhya?ama
mother's younger sister	macyu	phus?ama

== Thangmi songs ==
The Thami population are people who are rich in cultural and traditions. Their language is a large part of who they are and they portray this in their cultural, mostly in music. The Nepal Tham Society (NTS) produced a handful of Thangmi songs that were recorded in 2007. The lyrics were written by Singh Bahadur Thami, Devendra Thami and Lok Bahadur Thami. Here are some examples:

== Comparative vocabulary ==
The following 210-word list of five Thami dialects is from Regmi, et al. (2014). The dialects covered are:

- Babre VDC, Dolakha District
- Lapilang VDC, Dolakha District
- Suspa Kshamavati VDC, Dolakha District
- Daduwa VDC, Ramechhap District
- Chokati VDC, Sindhupalchok District

Baram words from Kansakar (2010) are also provided for comparison.

Gloss	Babre	Lapilang	Suspa Kshamavati	Daduwa	Chokati	Baram
body	mɑŋ	mɑŋ	mɑŋ	mɑŋ	jiu	aŋ (IA loan)
head	kɑpu	kɑpu	kɑpu	kɑpu	kɑpu	kəpu
hair	cimyɑŋ	cimeŋ	cimeŋ	mus	mus	sjam
face	kʰen	kʰen	kʰen	kʰen	kʰen	mik
eye	mese	mese	mesek	mese	mese	mik
ear	kulnɑ	kulnɑ	kulnɑ	kulnɑ	kulŋɑ	kuna
nose	ciŋɑ	ciŋyɑ	ciŋɑ	cĩyɑ̃	ciyɑ̃	cina
mouth	uɡo	uɡo	uɡo	ogo	ogo	anam
teeth	suwɑ	suwɑ	suwɑ	suwɑ	suwɑ	swa
tongue	cile	cile	cile	cile	cile	ce le
breast	cucu	cyucyu	cucu	nunu	cucu	nənu
belly	bɑŋkɑl	bɑŋkɑl	bɑŋkɑl	bʌŋɡʌl	bʌŋɡɑl	ujaŋ
arm/hand	lɑʔ	lɑʔ	lɑk	lɑ	lɑ	hit
elbow	uru	ɽuŋ	uru	uru	kuino	kuina (IA loan)
palm	oilyɑ	lɑʔ	lɑk	pɑti	lɑ	lapʈa
finger	cʰumpi	cʰumpi	cumpi	cyukuri	cukuri	əŋla (IA loan)
fingernail	pin	pin	pin	pin	pin	luŋdziŋ
leg	konʈe	konʈe	konʈe	konʈe	lɑi	undzik
skin	ʃebi	ʃebi	ʃebi	ʃebi	ʃebi	chala (IA loan)
bone	koʃɑ	koʃɑ	koʃɑ	koʃyɑ	koʃyɑ	haɖ (IA loan)
heart	loŋse	loŋse	loŋsek	loŋse	loŋse	muʈu (IA loan)
blood	cɑi	cɑi	cɑi	cʌi	cʌi	cihui
urine	uʃi	uʃi	uʃi	uʃi	uʃi	ci
feces	kuɽi	kuɽi	kiɽi	kuɽi	kili	ku
village	rɑɽe	dese	dese	dese	dese	hannuŋ (IA loan)
house	nem	nem	nem	nem	nem	nam
roof	cʰɑnɑ	cʰɑnɑ	pɑli	pɑli	cʰɑnɑ	chano
door	kʰɑɽoŋ	kʰɑɽuŋ	kʰɑɽo	kʰʌɽu	kʰɑɽu	ɖhoka (IA loan)
firewood	seŋ	seŋ	seŋ	seŋ	seŋ	siŋ
broom	tʰope	tʰope	tʰope	tʰope	tʰope	astuŋ
mortar	yɑmbɑʔ	lokmɑŋ	lokmɑŋ	ʈim	luŋ	siləuʈo (IA loan)
pestle	ulum	lok	ulum	ulum	loɦoro	lohoro
hammer	ʈʰokʈʰokyɑ	ʈʰokʈʰokyɑ	ʈʰokʈʰoke	ʈʰukʈʰukiɑ	ʈʰokʈʰokyɑ	hətəuɖo (IA loan)
knife	ɑikucɑ	ɑikucɑ	ɑikucɑ	kɑrdɑ	cʌkku	ukhmen
axe	rɑpɑ	rɑpɑ	rɑpɑ	rɑʔpɑ	rɑpɑ	kəm
rope	ʃɑkpɑ	ʃɑkpɑ	ʃɑkpɑ	ʃyɑpɑ	ɖɑmlɑ	ɖori (IA loan)
thread	dʰɑɡo	sɑle	benɑ	ʃyɑpɑ	dʰɑgo	ləkthun
needle	ɦili	ɦili	yuli	yuli	ɦuli	pənuŋ
cloth	myuŋ	miŋmyɑŋ	myuŋ	myũ	myuŋ	mu
ring	sɑimundro	sɑimundro	sɑimundro	ʌŋɡuliŋ	ʌũʈʰi	əŋʈhi (IA loan)
sun	uni	uni	uni	uni	uni	uni
moon	cʌlʌuni	cʌlʌuni	cʌlʌuni	cʌlɑʔuni	cʌlɑuni	cəlauni
sky	sʌrɡyɑ	sʌrɡyɑ	sʌrɡe	sʌrɡe	ʌkɑs	akas (IA loan)
star	ucʰi	ucʰi	ucʰi	ucʰi	ucʰi	tara (IA loan)
rain	pɑŋku	pɑŋkuyusɑ	jʰʌriuɑn	ʃyɑrde	jʰɑri	aŋmət
water	pɑŋku	pɑŋku	pɑŋku	pʌŋku	pɑŋku	awa
river	ʃoŋ	ʃoŋ	ʃoŋ	ʃoŋ	ʃoŋ	gudul
cloud	dʰummɑ	kʰɑʃu	kʰɑsu	dʰummɑ	dʰumpɑ	a mu
lightning	mirlisidu	sʌrɡyɑtowɑn	mirliksɑ	miklik	gʌɽɑŋguɽuŋtʰɑ	–
rainbow	indreni	indreni	indreni	lʌrkuni	indreni	indreni (IA loan)
wind	pʰɑʃɑ	pʰɑʃɑ	pʰɑʃɑ	pʰɑʃyɑ	pʰɑʃyɑ	asi
stone	ɽiŋ	ɽiŋ	liŋ	ɽiŋ	lyuŋ	kumba
path	ulɑm	ulɑm	ulɑm	ulɑm	ulɑm	uŋma
sand	pʰɑʃeɽiŋ	kʰreʔduɽiŋ	jɑŋkʰɑ	syɑŋɖo	bʌluwɑ	balwa (IA loan)
fire	me	me	me	me	me	mui
smoke	ɑsku	ɑsku	ɑsku	ɑcʰɑ	dʰuwɑ̃tʰɑn	isku
ash	tɑrbɑ	trɑbɑ	trɑbɑ	trɑbɑ	tɑbrɑ	maju
mud	nɑsɑ	nɑsɑ	nɑsɑ	nɑsɑ	nɑsɑ	nəsa
dust	pʰɑʃe	pʰɑsse	dʰule	buʃi	dʰulo	dhulo
gold	sun	loŋ	luŋ	ɡoɦo	sun	sun (IA loan)
tree	doŋbo	duŋbo	dombo	pole	ruk	sjaŋma
leaf	ɑjɑ	ɑjɑ	ɑjɑ	ɑjɑ	ɑjɑ	su
root	pole	pole	nɑrɑ	dɑrɑ	jɑrɑ	dzəra
thorn	puʈu	puʈu	puʈu	puʈu	puʈu	achu
flower	reŋ	reŋ	reŋ	reŋ	reŋ	phul (IA loan)
fruit	pʰɑlpʰul	pʰɑlpʰul	pʰɑlpʰul	kʌntʰʌmʌl	pʰɑlpʰul	phalphul (IA loan)
mango	ɑ̃p	ɑ̃p	ɑmcur	ɑ̃p	ɑ̃p	əmba (IA loan)
banana	muĩ	mui	muĩ	muĩ	mui	umse
wheat (husked)	jɑʔcʰo	jɑʔcʰo	jɑkso	jɑcʰo	jɑʔcʰo	gəu
barley	ɑkɑn	ɑkɑn	ɑkɑn	ɑkɑn	ɑkɑn	dzəu
rice (husked)	jɑke	jɑki	jɑke	meke	jɑke	hadza
potato	kwɑi	kwɑi	kwɑi	kwɑi	koi	alu (IA loan)
eggplant	bɑnʈɑ	bɑnʈɑ	bʰenʈɑ	bʌnʈɑ	bʰẽɽi	bhənʈa (IA loan)
groundnut	bʌdɑm	bʌdɑm	bʌdɑm	bʌdɑm	bʌdɑm	bədam (IA loan)
chili	mɑrci	mʌrci	mɑrci	ɑso	kʰorsɑni	asok
turmeric	ɦʌrdi	ɦʌrdi	ɦʌrdi	besɑr	besɑr	besar (IA loan)
garlic	lʌsun	lʌsun	lʌsun	lʌmbo	lʌsun	ləsun (IA loan)
onion	pyɑj	pyɑj	pyɑj	pyɑj	pyɑj	pjadz (IA loan)
cauliflower	reŋkopi	reŋkopi	kopi	kɑuli	kɑuli	kauli (IA loan)
tomato	bɑnʈɑ	ɡyɑmbɑlɑ	ɡɑmbʌl	bʌnʈɑ	golbʰẽɽɑ	golbhẽɖa (IA loan)
cabbage	ɑjɑkopi	ɑjɑkopi	bʌndɑ	bʌndɑ	bʌndɑ	bənda (IA loan)
oil	ɑsɑ	ɑsɑ	ɑsɑ	ɑsɑ	ɑsɑ	asa
salt	cʰyɑ	cʰyɑ	cʰɑ	cʰyɑ	cʰɑ	cha
meat	cici	cici	cici	ɑcʰin	cici	ku sja
fat (of meat)	cʰeu	cʰou	cʰeu	cʰo	cʰyʌu	kucho
fish	nɑŋɑ	nɑŋɑ	nɑŋɑ	nɑŋɑ	nɑŋɑ	nəŋa
chicken	wɑcɑ	wɑcɑ	wɑcɑ	wɑcɑ	wɑcɑ	hocca
egg	om	ɑɦum	ɑɦum	ɑum	ɑum	ohom
cow	mɑmɑʃyɑ	mɑmɑʃyɑ	mɑmɑʃyɑ	ʃyɑ	ʃyɑ	sja
buffalo	meʃɑ	meʃɑ	meʃɑ	meʃyɑ	miʃyɑ	bhəisi (IA loan)
milk	olon	olon	olʌn	nunu	nunu	nənu
horns	nɑru	nɑru	nɑru	nɑru	nɑru	ujuŋ
tail	lime	lime	limek	leme	lime	pitik
goat	ʈuɽi	ʈuɽi	ʈuɽi	culi	culi	mi chja
dog	kucu	kucu	kucu	kucu	kucu	a kja
snake	rul	rul	rul	rul	rul	pəi hu
monkey	mɑkɑr	mɑkɑr	mɑkɑr	yu	yu	pəi huk
mosquito	ʈinini	ʈinini	ʈinini	lʌkʰʌʈoʈo	lɑmkʰuʈʈe	lamkhuʈʈe (IA loan)
ant	ʈiko	ʈiku	ʈiku	cukku	cuku	anap
spider	mɑkɑrpɑpɑ	mɑkɑrpɑpɑ	mɑkɑrpɑpɑ	jrɑmpʰɑl	jʌrɑmpɑl	dzənna
name	nɑme	nɑme	nɑme	nɑme	nɑme	u men
man	mi	mi	mi	mi	mi	bal
woman	cɑmɑicɑ	cɑmɑicɑ	cɑmɑicɑ	cɑmɑicɑ	cɑmɑicɑ	mama
child	ɦocɑ	ucɑ	ɦucɑ	ɦuccɑ	ɦucɑ	uca
father	ɑpɑ	ɑpɑ	ɑpɑ	ɑpɑ	ɑpɑ	papa
mother	ɑmɑ	ɑmɑ	ɑmɑ	ɑmɑ	ɑmɑ	ama (IA loan)
older brother	bubu	bubu	bubu	bubu	bubu	dadze (IA loan)
younger brother	ɦu	ɦu	ɦu	ɦu	ɦu	ale
older sister	tete	tete	tete	tete	tete	didi (IA loan)
younger sister	ɦumi	ɦomi	ɦumi	ɦumi	ɦu	abi
son	cɑ	cɑ	cɑ	cɑ	cɑ	ucuwa
daughter	cɑmɑi	cɑmɑi	cɑmɑi	cɑmɑi	cɑmɑi	ucuməi
husband	lɑwɑ	ʈʰoɽe	lɑwɑ	lɑwɑ	lɑwɑ	ukəi
wife	umɑ	umɑ	umɑ	umɑ	umɑ	uməi
boy	ʃɑrɑ	ʃɑrɑ	cɑɦucɑ	ʃɑrɑ	cɑ	papaca
girl	ʃɑrmɑ	ʃɑrmɑ	cɑmɑicɑ	ʃyɑrmi	cɑmɑi	mamaca
day	unise	unise	unise	ʃyɑŋ	unise	unis
night	ʈɑɦe	ʈɑɦe	ʈɑe	cyɑe	cyɑ	rat (IA loan)
morning	bʌcinʈe	bʌcinʈe	bʌsinʈe	bʌsinʈe	bɑʃe	hamdzaŋ
noon	unise	unise	unise	unise	unise	diuso (IA loan)
evening	ŋyoɽiŋ	ŋyoɽi	ŋyʌɽiŋ	nyõɽi	cyɑtʰɑn	hole
yesterday	miryɑŋ	miryɑŋ	miryɑŋ	merɡʰyɑŋ	merɡʰyɑŋ	minja
today	yɑŋ	yɑŋ	yɑŋ	yɑŋ	yɑŋ	təja
tomorrow	bɑʈʈʰe	bɑʈʈʰe	bɑʈʰe	bɑʃe	bʰʌĩse	hogei
week	ɦʌptɑ	ɦʌptɑ	ɦʌptɑ	loʔʃyɑŋ	sɑtɑdin	həpta (IA loan)
month	mʌinɑ	mʌinɑ	mʌɦine	sumcpʃyɑŋ	mʌinɑ	məina (IA loan)
year	kɑle	kɑle	kɑle	dɑrɑ	bʌrsʌ	bərsə (IA loan)
old	kʰɑru	kʰɑru	kʰɑru	kʰɑru	kʰɑru	cəŋpa
new	nɑke	nɑke	nɑkɑ	nɑkɑ	nɑkɑ	kawoi
good	ɑprɑ	ɑprɑ	ɑprɑ	kʌstɑ	ɑprɑ	kisen
bad	mɑʔɑprɑ	mɑʔɑprɑ	ɦijebɑ	mɑjɑdu	mɑʔɑprɑ	məsen
wet	pʰodu	pʰodu	pʰodu	pʰodu	bʰijɑiŋɑn	kjasun
dry	ɡɑŋdu	mɑpʰodu	pʰʌŋpʰʌŋ	gʌŋdu	mɑbʰijɑi	sukhkha (IA loan)
long	ʌlʌmɡɑ	ʌlʌmɡɑ	ʌlʌmɡɑ	ʌlʌmɡɑ	ʌlʌmɡɑ	alok
short	ucʰiɡɑ	ucʰiɡɑ	ucʰikɑ	ucʰiɡɑ	ucʰiɡɑ	ikuri
hot	ɑdum	ɑdum	ɑdum	ɑdum	ɑdum	kewon
cold	ʈilɑ	ʈilɑ	ɑjik	iji	cilɑŋɑn	kjasun
right	cɑkʰur	cɑkʰur	cɑkʰur	cɑkʰur	dɑɦine	daine (IA loan)
left	kʰolɑ	kʰolɑ	kʰolɑ	kʰolɑ	debre	debre (IA loan)
near	kʰer	kʰer	kʰerte	kʰereŋ	cʰeute	igin
far	ʌlʌmtʰɑ	ʌlʌmtʰɑ	ʌlʌmtʰɑ	ʌlʌmtʰɑ	ɑlɑmtʰɑ	kalok
big	jekʰɑ	jekʰɑ	jekʰɑ	jekʰɑ	jʰokɑ	alam
small	ucyɑ	ucyɑ	ucɑcɑ	ucyɑncɑ	ecenɑ	ikine
heavy	ɡʌruŋ	ɡʌruŋ	ɡɑnunidu	gʌrum	ɡʌruŋ	gegruŋ (IA loan)
light	ɦʌluŋ	ɦʌluŋ	pʰinpʰincɑ	ɦʌluŋ	ɦʌluŋ	həlka (IA loan)
above	ɦyute	ɦyute	ɦyute	ɦyute	ɦyobbi	khuŋ
below	nʰɑte	nʰɑte	nʰɑte	nʰɑnɑi	nɑbi	hjaŋ
white	ubo	ubo	ubo	ubo	obo	gjabo
black	kiji	kiji	kiji	kiji	kiji	ciliŋ
red	ɖiŋɖiŋ	ɖiŋɖiŋ	ɖiŋɖiŋ	ɖiŋɖiŋ	keret	phəija
one	di	di	di	di	de	de
two	nis	nis	nis	nis	nis	nis
three	sum	sum	sum	sum	sum	som
four	oli	oli	oli	oli	wɑli	car (IA loan)
five	wɑlŋɑ	wɑlŋɑ	wɑlŋɑ	wɑ̃lɑ	hwɑlŋɑ	pãc (IA loan)
six	mɑt	mɑt	mɑt	mʌt	mɑt	chə (IA loan)
seven	rɑ	rɑ	ro	lo	ɽo	sat (IA loan)
eight	lɑ	lɑ	lɑ	lɑ	lɑ	aʈh (IA loan)
nine	kit	kit	kyut	kit	kit	nəu
ten	dicip	dicip	dicip	dicip	dʰicip	dəs
eleven	dicipdi	dicipdi	dicipdi	dicipdi	dʰicipde	egharə
twelve	dicipnis	dicipnis	dicipnis	dicipnis	dʰicipnis	barə
twenty	nisdicip	nisdicip	nisdicip	nisdicip	nisdʰicip	bis
one hundred	dicipdicip	dicipdicip	dicipdicip	dicipdicip	dʰicipdʰicip	de səe (IA loan)
who	su	su	su	su	su	su
what	ɦɑrɑ	ɦɑrɑ	ɦɑrɑ	ɦɑrɑ	ɦɑrɑ	hai
where	kutɑ	kutɑ	kutɑ	kutɑ	kutɑ	kuni
when	kutɑleŋ	kutɑleŋ	kutɑleŋ	kutɑleŋ	ɦɑŋgɑlyɑŋ	kəile
how many	ɦɑni	ɦɑni	ɦɑni	ɦɑ̃lĩ	ɦɑi	kwa
which	kundu	kundu	kundu	kundu	kundu	kun
this	kɑ	kɑ	kɑ	kɑ	kɑ	jo
that	to	to	to	dʰɑ	to	tjo
these	kɑbɑŋ	kɑbɑŋ	kɑbɑŋ	kʌpʌliŋ	kɑbɑli	jibaŋ
those	tobɑŋ	tobɑŋ	tobɑŋ	topʌliŋ	tobɑŋ	ubaŋ
same	to	to	to	to	to	ui
different	bʰindʌi	bʰindʌi	beɡɑle	toŋɑkɑ	pʰʌrʌk	phərək (IA loan)
whole	sɑkkʰɑle	sɑkʰɑle	sɑkɑle	sɑkɑle	sʌkkʰɑli	səbəi (IA loan)
broken	kwɑdu	kwɑʔdu	kwɑɡdu	ʈʰemɑn	cʰyomdu	kipak
few	ucʰincɑ	ucʰincɑ	ucʰin	ucʰincɑ	icʰini	jurse
many	ɑɦe	ɑɦe	ɑɦe	ɑɦe	ɑɦe	dherəi (IA loan)
all	sɑkkʰɑle	sɑkʰɑle	sɑkɑle	sɑkɑle	sʌkkʰɑli	səpəi (IA loan)
eat	cyɑsɑ	cyɑsɑ	cyɑsɑ	cyɑsɑ	cyɑsɑ	cago
bite	ceʔsɑ	ceʔsɑ	ceksɑ	ceʔsɑ	ceʔsɑ	aŋakko
hungry	krɑisɑ	krɑisɑ	kʌrɑisɑ	krʌisɑ	isɑkɑrɑinɑn	hego
drink	tunsɑ	tunsɑ	tunsɑ	tuncʰɑ	tuncʰɑ	sjaŋgo
thirsty	lɑkɑisɑ	lɑkɑisɑ	lɑkɑsɑ	lɑkɑŋsɑ	lɑkɑinɑn	əs kago
sleep	ɑmisɑ	ɑmisɑ	ɑmisɑ	ɑmisɑ	ɑmisɑ	nago
lie	pʌlʈʌisisɑ	pʌlʈʌisisɑ	pʌlʈʌisɑ	bliŋsɑ	pʌlʈʌisisɑ	ləllumgo
sit	ɦoʔsɑ	ɦoʔsɑ	ɦoksɑ	ɦoʔsɑ	ɦoʔsɑ	hukko
give	piʔsɑ	piʔsɑ	pisɑ	piʔsɑ	piccʰɑ	pigo
burn	cieʔsɑ	jousɑ	jyoksɑ	joʔsɑ	jyʌusɑ	cimakko
die	sisɑ	sisɑ	sisɑ	sisɑ	sisɑ	sigo
kill	sɑtcʰɑ	sɑtcʰɑ	sɑtcʰɑ	sʌtcʰɑ	sɑccʰɑ	sat ko
fly	persɑ	persɑ	persɑ	persɑ	persɑ	ublego
walk	cɑwɑsɑ	cɑwɑsɑ	cɑwɑsɑ	cɑwɑsɑ	cɑwɑsɑ	dzjogo
run	droʔsɑ	droʔsɑ	droksɑ	droʔsɑ	dorʌsɑ	gəbango
go	ɦensɑ	ɦensɑ	ɦensɑ	ɦensɑ	ɦensɑ	jago
come	rɑʔsɑ	rɑʔsɑ	rɑsɑ	rɑʔsɑ	rɑʔsɑ	təigo
speak	cijyɑŋsɑ	cijyɑŋsɑ	cijyɑŋsɑ	cijyɑŋsɑ	cijɑŋsɑ	khəlago
hear/listen	nɑsɑisɑ	nɑsɑisɑ	nɑsɑisɑ	nɑsɑisɑ	nɑsɑisɑ	nago
look	yoʔsɑ	yoʔsɑ	yosɑ	jyɑpsɑ	jyɑpsɑ	ni go
I	ɡɑi	ɡɑi	ɡɑi	ɡʌi	ɡɑi	ŋa
you (informal)	nɑŋ	nɑŋ	nɑŋ	nʌŋ	nɑŋ	nuŋ
you (formal)	nɑŋtʰe	nɑŋtʰe	nɑŋkʰe	nʌŋ	nɑŋ	nuŋ
he	to	to	to	to	to	u (IA loan)
she	to	to	to	to	to	u
we (inclusive)	ni	ni	ni	ni	tʰe	niru
we (exclusive)	ni	ni	ni	ni	tʰe	niru
you (plural)	niŋpɑli	niŋpɑli	niŋ	nʌŋpɑliŋ	nʌŋpɑli	tibaŋ
they	tobɑŋ	tobɑŋ	tobɑŋ	topɑliŋ	topɑliŋ	ubaŋ
