= Baram–Thangmi languages =

Tibeto-Burman languages spoken in Nepal

Baram–Thangmi
- Thangmi–Baraamu
- Geographic distribution: Nepal
- Linguistic classification: Sino-Tibetan: Newaric; Baram–Thangmi
- Subdivisions: Baram; Thangmi

Language codes
- Glottolog: than1258

The Baram–Thangmi languages, Baram and Thangmi are Tibeto-Burman languages spoken in Nepal. They are classified as part of the Newaric branch by van Driem (2003) and Turin (2004), who view Newar as being most closely related to Baram–Thangmi.

They were formerly classified as part of Mahakiranti by George van Driem (2001), who later retracted the hypothesis in van Driem (2003).

== See also ==
- Baram-Thangmi comparative vocabulary list (Wiktionary)
