= Newaric languages =

Sino-Tibetan language group of Nepal

Newaric
- Parakiranti, Maha-Newari
- Geographic distribution: Nepal
- Linguistic classification: Sino-Tibetan: Newaric
- Subdivisions: Newar; Baram–Thangmi

Language codes
- Glottolog: newa1245

The Newaric languages are a proposed group of Sino-Tibetan languages. George van Driem (2003) and Mark Turin (2004) argue that Newar and Baram–Thangmi (consisting of the two closely related languages Baram and Thangmi) share many features with each other, and thus group with each other.

== Comparative vocabulary ==
The following comparative 100-word Swadesh list of the Newaric languages Baram, Thami (Thangmi), and Newar, along with Chepang is from Kansakar, et al. (2011: 220–223).

English gloss	Baram	Thami	Newar	Chepang
I	ŋa	gai	ji	ŋa
you	naŋ	naŋ	cʰə, cʰi	naŋ
we	ni	ni	jʰi:, jipĩ	ni, ŋi
this	yo	ka	tʰwə	ʔiʔ
that	u, to	to	wə	ʔowʔ, ʔuwʔ
who	su	su	su	su
what	hai	hara	cʰu	doh
not	ma-	ma-	mə-, -mə-	-la, -ma
all	səpəi (< Nep.)	sakale	pʰukkə, dakkwə	juda, ʔanə
many	dʰerəi (< Nep.)	ahe	ye-kwə	ʔa.nə
one	de	di	cʰə-gu	yat
two	nis	nis	nyi-gu	nis
large	alam	jekʰa	tə:dʰə̃:	taŋh-ʔo
long	alam	ələmga	tahakə:	gyaŋ-ʔo
small	ikine	ucya	cidʰi:, cidʰə:̃	mi-ʔo
woman	mama	camaica	misa	nom-coʔ
man	papa	mi	mijə̃	goy-coʔ
person	bal	mi	mənu	manta, coʔ
fish	nəŋa	naŋa	nya	ŋaʔ
bird	jyali, wa (hen)	ḍaŋaṇeŋ, wa (hen)	jʰə̃gə:	waʔ
dog	akya	kucu	kʰyica	kuyʔ
louse	kʰat	sirik	syi	kras, srəyk
tree	seŋma	seŋ	syi-ma	siŋʔ
seed	ayu	puya	pusa	sayʔ
leaf	su/hola	aja	ləpte, hə:	lo, mat
root	jəra (< Nep.)	nara	ha	rut, goyʔ
bark	bokra (< Nep.)	sebu (skin)	kʰwəla	pun
skin	cʰala (< Nep.)	sebi	cʰẽgu	pun
meat	kusya	cici	la	mayʔ
blood	cihwui	cwoi, cəi	hi	wəyʔ
bone	hoṭ	kʰosa	kwəẽ	hrus
fat	ucʰo	cʰyəu, cyou	da:	cʰaw
egg	wohom, wom	ahum, wom	kʰẽ:	ʔum
horn	uyuŋ	naru	nyeku	roŋʔ
tail	pitik	limek	nʰipyə̃:	meʔ
feather	pwãkʰ (< Nep.)	-	pəpu	meʔ, pʰeh
hair	syam	sam	sə̃:	myaŋ
head	kəpu	kapu	cʰyə̃:	ta.laŋ
ear	kuna	kunla	nʰaepə̃	no
eye	mik	mesek	mikʰa	mik
nose	cina	ciŋa	nʰae	neh
mouth	anam	ugo	mʰutu	hmo.toŋ
teeth	swa	suwa	wa	syək, səyk
tongue	cele	cile	mye	le
nail	luŋjiŋ, ləgjuŋ	pin	lusyi	sən
leg	unjik	konṭe, ulaŋ	tuti	dom
knee	gʰũḍa (< Nep.)	pokolek	puli	kryoŋ
hand	hit	lak	lʰa:	krut
abdomen	uyaŋ	baŋkal, guŋguŋ	pwa:	tuk
throat	gʰãṭi (< Nep.)	kaṇṭu	gəpə:	kəyk
breast	nənu	nunu	duru-pwə	ʔoh
heart	muṭu	loŋsek	nugə	hluŋ
liver	kəlejo (< Nep.)	-	syẽ	sinh
drink	syaŋ-go	tun-sa	twəne, twənə	tuŋʔ-na
eat	ca-go	cya-sa	nələ, nəye	jeʔ-na
bite	aŋak-ko	cek-sa	nyatə, wã nyaye	ŋawh-na
look	ayo-go, ni-go	yo-sa	kʰənə, kʰəne	yo-na, cewʔ-na
hear	səi-go	na-sai-sa	talə, taye	sayʔ-na
know	ra-go, cigo	sai-sa	silə, syiye	ci-na
sleep	nu-go	ammi-sa	denə, dene	ʔenʔ-sa
die	si-go	si-sa	sitə, syie	si-sa
kill	sat-ko	sat-sa	syatə, syae	sat-sa
swim	pəuri bəne-go (< Nep.)	lampasa	lalkalə/kaye	laʔ-na, kwelh-na
fly	uble-go	per-sa	bwələ, bwəye	syuŋ-na
walk	jyo-go, ya-go (go)	cawa-sa, ajyaca	nya:se, wənə, wəye	wah-na
arrive	hyuŋcelgo	kelet-sa	wələ, jʰalə	waŋ-na
lie	na-go	ami-sa	mu:pulə,	ʔenʔ-na
sit	huk-ko	hok-sa	dilə, pʰetuye	cuŋʔ-na
stand	ṭʰiŋ-go	tʰeŋ-sa	dənə, dane	ciŋ-na
give	pi-go	pi-sa	bila, biye	bəyʔ-na, hla-na
say	da-go	ŋa-sa, isdu	dʰalə, dʰaye	dayh-na
sun	uni	uni	surdyə:	nyam
moon	cəlauni	cəlauni	timila	lah
star	tara (< Nep.)	ucʰi	nəu, nəgu	kar
water	awa	paŋku	lə:	tiʔ
rain	aŋmət	yudu	wa	tiʔ, waʔ-ʔo
stone	kumba	lyuŋ, liŋ	lwəhã	baŋ
sand	-	-	pʰi	-
earth	nəsa	nasa	ca	saʔ
cloud	amu	kʰasu	supãe	mus
smoke	isku	asku	kũ	hmeʔ-ku
fire	mui	me	mi	hmeʔ
ash	mau	tarba	nəu	hmeʔ-mut
burn	jo-go	jyou-sa	cyatə, cyaye	jʰəm-na
way/path	uŋma	ulam	lã	lyam
mountain	pahaḍ	cyuri (top)	gu	pa.har
red	pʰəya	keret	hyãũ	du-ʔo
green	həriyo (< Nep.)	-	wãũ	pli-ʔo
yellow	keuwo	melu	mʰasu	yar-ʔo
white	gyabo	ubo	tuyu:	bʰam-ʔo
black	ciliŋ	kiji	haku	gal-ʔo
night	rat (< Nep.)	ṭa	canʰəe, ca	ya. ʔdiŋ
hot	gyodum	adum	kwa:	dʰah-ʔo
cool	ciso (< Nep.)	ajik	kʰwaũ	nik-ʔo
full	kipoŋ	ir-ir	ja:	bliŋ-ʔo
new	kaui	naka	nʰu:	rəw-ʔo
good	kisen	apraca	bʰĩ:	pe-ʔo
round	golo (< Nep.)	kurliŋ	gwəlla:	luŋ-o, gore
dried	kyoksi	areŋ, gaŋdu	gə̃gu	sot-ʔo
name	umin	name	nã	məyŋ
