= Baram language =

Endangered Newaric language of Nepal

Baram
- Baraamu
- Balkura
- Region: Nepal
- Ethnicity: 7,400 Baram (2001 census)
- Native speakers: 160 (2011 census)
- Language family: Sino-Tibetan: Newaric; Baram–Thangmi; Baram

Language codes
- ISO 639-3: brd
- Glottolog: bara1357
- ELP: Baram

Baram (Baraamu, Bhramu, Baraamu: Balkura 'human language') is a critically endangered Sino-Tibetan language spoken in Nepal. Speakers are shifting to Nepali. Dialects are Dandagaun and Mailung.

== Status ==
According to the 2001 report by the Central Bureau of Statistics, 342 people (around 4.6%) of the Baram people spoke Baram, while the rest of the population (95.4%) had switched to Nepali.

== Geographic distribution ==
Baram is spoken in Dandagaun and Mailung Village Development Commitees in central and southern Gorkha District, Gandaki Province, and in Takhu village up the Doraundi Khola (east side above Chorgate, near Kumhali) (Ethnologue). There are possibly about 7 villages in Dhading District, Bagmati Province. Only nine speakers were identified in Mailung, and the only people who used it were an elderly couple; the other seven were the only speakers in their households and did not use it. Dandagaun is the only village where Baram is still used, where 129 people identified as speakers of Baram, and it is no longer used in "natural discourse".

== Classification ==
The language closest to Baram is Thangmi.

== Dialects ==
Some phonetic variation is present between Baram speakers in Mailung and Dandagaun.

== Phonology ==
=== Vowels ===
Baram has a six-vowel system. Nasality is contrastive for certain vowels, though its distribution is uneven, and length is only phonetic.

	Front	Central	Back
Close	i		u
Mid	e		o
Open		ə a	

=== Consonants ===
In words native to Baram, 21 consonants are found. Other consonants are found only in Nepali loanwords.

=== Phonotactics ===
Possible syllable structures in Baram are V, CV, VC, CVC, CCV, and CCVC, where V represents any vowel and C any consonant.
