= Sunakhani =

Sunkhani सुनखानी
- Ward Committee in Kalinchowk Rural Municipality, Dolakha
- Sunkhani
- Anthem: सयौँ थुङ्गा फुलका...
- Interactive map of Sunkhani
- Country: Nepal
- Province: Bagmati Province
- Rural Municipality: Kalinchowk Rural Municipality
- Places: Makaibari, Soti, Bhatteli, ManeBhatteli, Kalinag, Chaughara, Nibare, Chisapani, Dhunge, Milldada, Chaparku, Bhadaure

Government
  - Type: Local Government
  - Chairmans: Ram Bdr Pandey (Ward No.7) [[CPN Maoist center]] and Surya Bdr Acharya [[Nepali congress ]] (Ward No.08) (CPN maoist center)
- Time zone: Nepal Time
- Postal Code: 45509
- Area code: +977

Sunkhani is a ward committee located in Kalinchowk Rural Municipality of Dolakha District in the Bagmati Province of north-eastern Nepal. Formally it was a Village Development Committee of Dolakha District. Sunkhani consists of two ward (7 and 8) committees. The office of Kalinchowk Rural Municipality also lies in Sunkhani ward number 08.

Shree Kalinag Temple, Chaughara Darbaar and Ganesh Pati are the much famous holy places in Sunkhani which are the popular destination of internal and external tourists.

At the time of the 1991 Nepal census it had a population of 5,349. The village is connected to the district headquarter, Charikot by a roadway.

Main Casts : Shiwakoti, Aacharya, Poudel, Pathak, Budhathoki

Schools/Colleges in Sunkhani : Shree Kalinag Secondary School, Kalinag Multiple College, Shree Devisthan Basic School, Shree Sitka Secondary School.

Health Posts : Sunkhani Health Post

Banks : Laxmi Bank Ex. Co., Kalinchowk 08, Sunkhani

Co-Operatives Anandadayak multi-purpose Co-Operative, Kalinag saving and credit Co-operative Shringeshwor Co-Operative

Markets : Soti, Kalinag, Milldada, Bhadaure, sitka, shyaulye

Streets : Charikot-Lambagar Sadakkhanda, Thumka-Makaibari Road, Padekhala-Kalipokhari Road,

Villages : Makaibari, Bhatteli, ManeBhatteli, Chisaapani, Nibare, Dhunge, Bhadaure, Chaparku, Sakhalbu, Malepu

Neighbouring Wards : Lapilang, Lamidada, Sundrawati

Neighbouring Municipalities : Bhimeshwor, Baiteshwor, Gaurishankar

Hills : Sringeswor Hill

Governmental Offices: Kalinchowk Rural Municipality Office, Ward Offices of Sunkhani
