= Mangottu Bhagavathi Temple =

Hindu temple in Kerala, India

- Mangottu Bhagavathy Temple, Athipotta, Palakkad, Kerala

Religion
- Affiliation: Hinduism
- District: Palakkad
- Deity: Mangottu Bhagavati
- Festival: Mangottu Kavu vela

Location
- Location: Athipotta
- State: Kerala
- Country: India
- Interactive map of Mangottu Bhagavathi Temple
- Coordinates: 10.670355°N 76.485412°E

Architecture
- Type: Architecture of Kerala

Specifications
- Temple: One
- Elevation: 81.71 m (268 ft)

Mangottu Bhagavathi Temple is in Athipotta, 24 km from Palakkad via Alathur. The Hindu goddess of the temple, Mangottu Bhagavathi, is considered the younger sister of Parakkattu Bhagwathi who has a temple in Kavasseri near by.

== See also ==
- Temples of Kerala
