= Athipotta =

- village
- Location in Kerala, India Athipotta (India)
- Coordinates: 10°39′48″N 76°29′18″E
- Country: India
- State: Kerala
- District: Palakkad

Languages
  - Official: Malayalam, English
- Time zone: UTC+5:30 (IST)
- Vehicle registration: KL-
- Nearest city: palakkad

Athipotta is a small village near Alathur in the Palakkad district of Kerala state, south India. It's about 30 km from Palakkad town and 10 km from Alathur. The location was called South Malabar by the British Colonial administration.

== Economy ==
Traditionally, the primary economic activity of this village has been rice cultivation, manufacturing of ceramic tiles and vegetable farming. More recently, there has been a shift towards private, commercial enterprises such as textile shops, grocery shops and telecommunication units. Being a small unit of political administration, a Panchayat, the local government is run by various representatives of the village.

== Religious place ==
Athipotta is famous for the Mangottu Kavu Temple. The village activities are centered on this Hindu temple. There has been continuous progress at the temple and in the village due to the influx of devotees from around the world.

== Transportation ==
Athipotta has access to two airports, Coimbatore, Tamil Nadu and Kochi/Cochin International Airport.

Athipotta is a village known for variety of rich cultural canons with high order of traditional values.

== Etymology ==
The name 'Athipotta' believed to be derived from a Sanskrit term 'Hasti' in combination with a vernacular term 'Potta'. ‘Hasti’ means elephant and ‘Potta’ means a flat terrain or an upland. Thus, an upland enriched with higher traditional standards.
