= Ishvari =

Hindu epithet

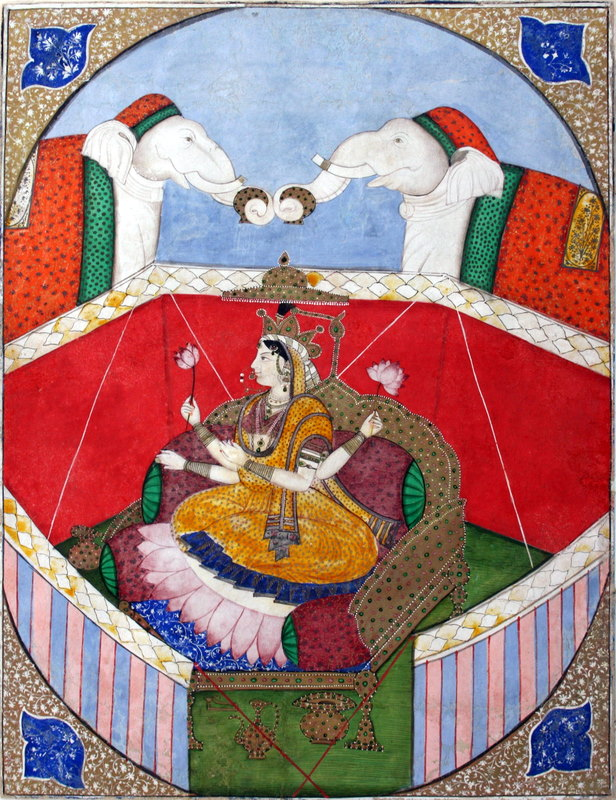
Lakshmi

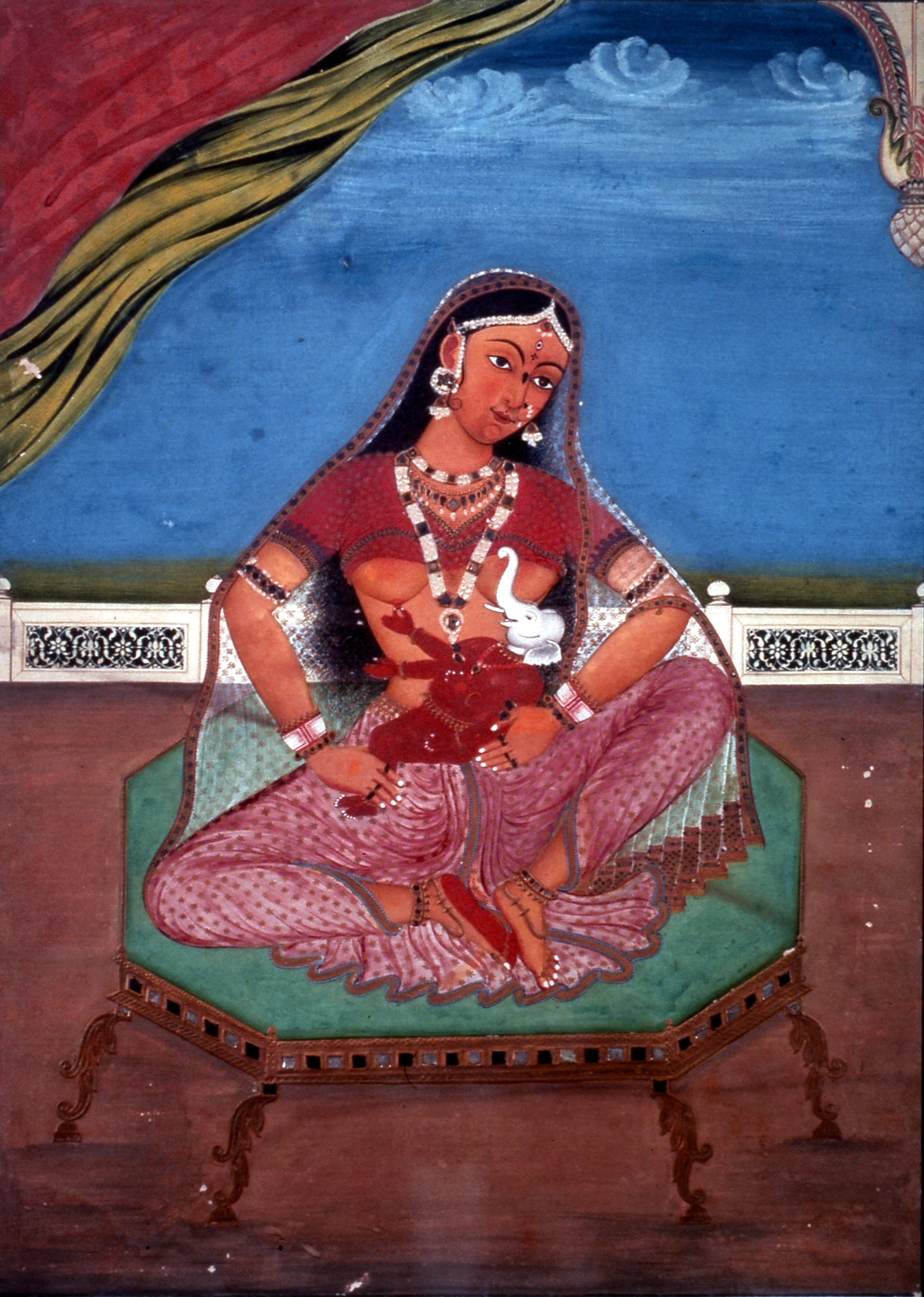
Parvati

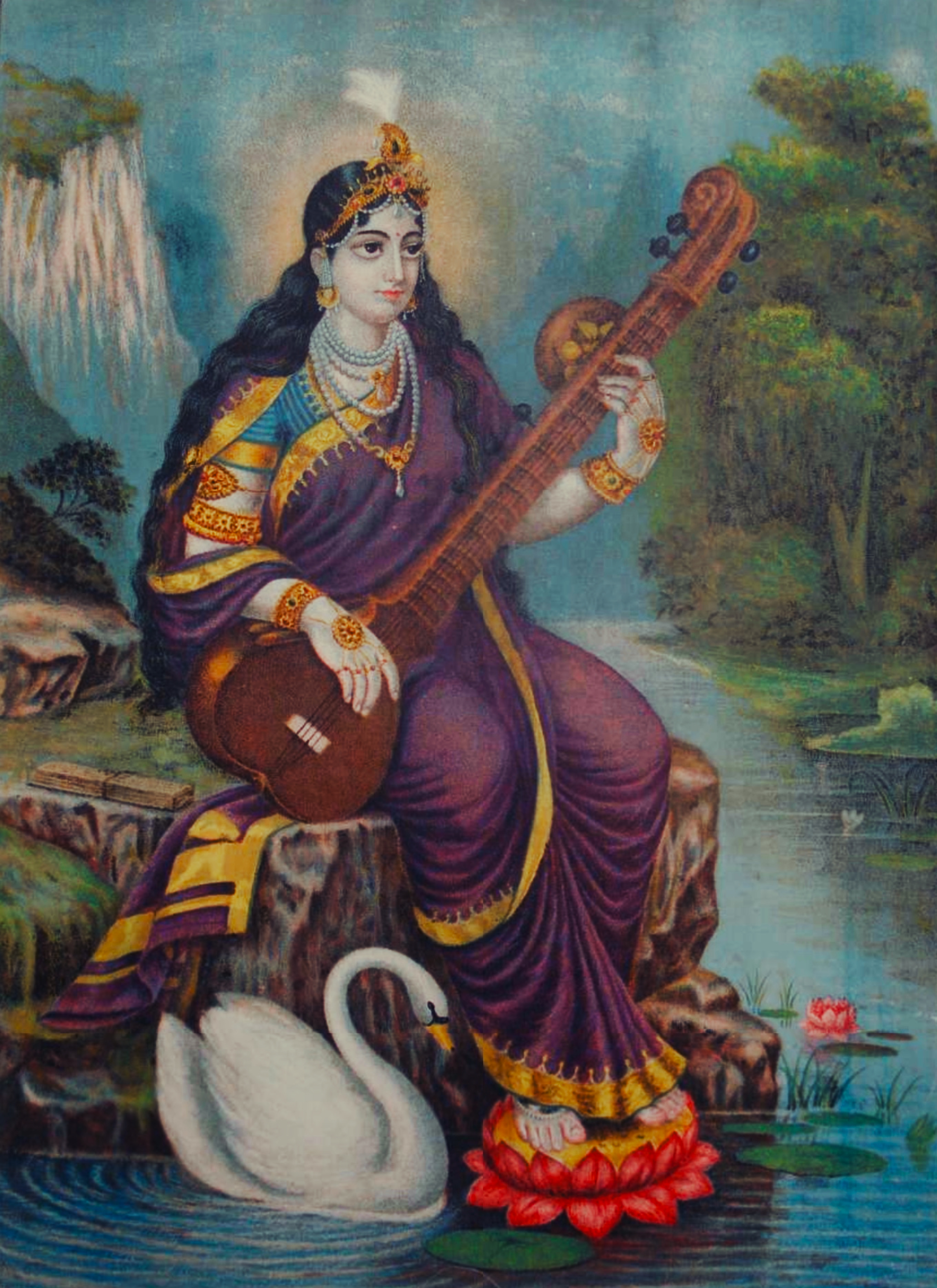
Saraswati

Ishvari (Sanskrit: ईश्वरी, IAST: Īśvarī) is a Hindu epithet of Sanskrit origin, referring to the Goddess, the divine female counterpart of Ishvara. It is also a term that refers to the shakti, or the feminine energy of the Trimurti, which refer to Saraswati, Lakshmi, and Parvati.

== Etymology ==
The root of the word is the Sanskrit syllable īś, "to be valid or powerful; to be master of", joined with vara, "select, choicest, valuable, precious, best, most excellent or eminent among" When referring to divine as female, particularly in Shaktism, the feminine Īśvarī is sometimes used.
