= Kalinchowk Bhagwati Temple =

Kalinchok Bhagwati Temple
- कालिञ्चोक भगवती मन्दिर
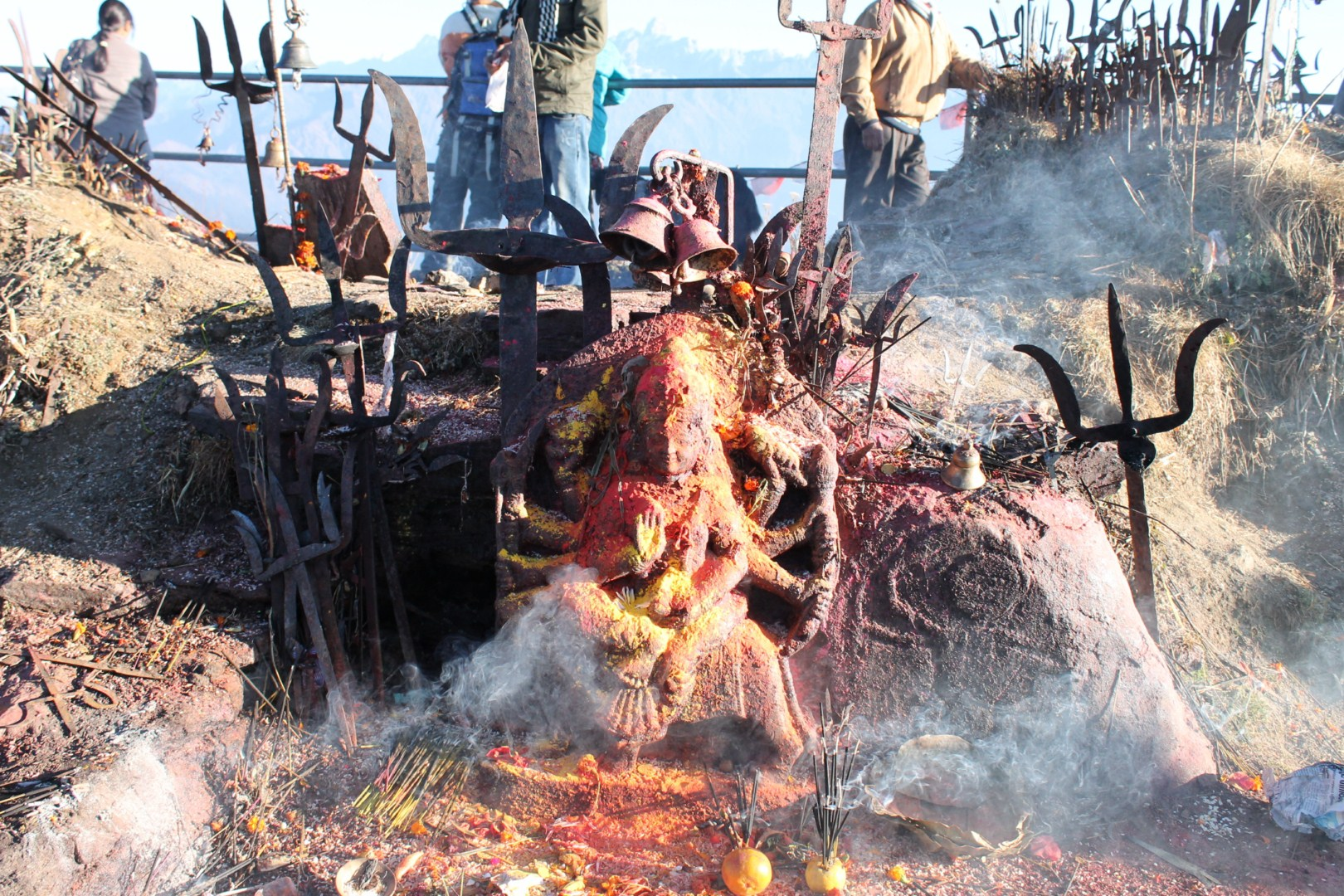

- Location in Nepal

Religion
- Affiliation: Hinduism
- District: Dolakha
- Province: Bagmati
- Deity: Kali
- Festivals: Chaitra Dashain, Dashain

Location
- Location: Kalinchowk Rural Municipality
- Country: Nepal
- Interactive map of Kalinchok Bhagwati Temple
- Coordinates: 27°45′28″N 86°02′29″E

Kalinchok Bhagwati Temple (Nepali: कालिञ्चोक भगवती मन्दिर) is a Hindu shrine located in the eastern hilly region of Nepal, Kalinchowk Rural Municipality in Dolakha District.

It is situated in Kalinchok Village (ward no. 1 of Kalinchok RM) at the altitude of 3,842 m (12,605 ft) from sea level. It is a part of Gaurishankar Conservation Area from where two rivers Sun Koshi and Tamakoshi rivers are sourced.

Kalinchowk is one of the most visited local destinations in the winter. It is known for the trek to the shrine. It used to be the only way to the temple, but in 2018 a cable car has been added to help with the growing number of visitors.

== Tourism ==
Kalinchowk is a destination for adventurous sports such as skiing during the winter season after the snowfall. Short hiking of about 1–2 hours from Kuri village to the Kainchowk temples is also common. This place has views of the snowy valley during the winter season and enjoys the snowfall. Some other attractions are;

1. Kalinchowk Bhagwati temple
2. Cable car
3. The landscape of Kuri village.
4. Skilling and short hiking.
5. View of Mt jugal, Sumeru Parbat Gaurishanker, Mt Ganesh, and Pathivara.
6. The national flower of Nepal, Rhododendron.
7. Local Yak Cheese, churpi and padamchal.
8. Shooting Hub

The area's landscapes, Kalinchowk Bhagwati shrine, Kuri village, and mountain views are attractions of Kalinchowk.
