= Babare =

Babare बाबरे
- Village/Neighborhood
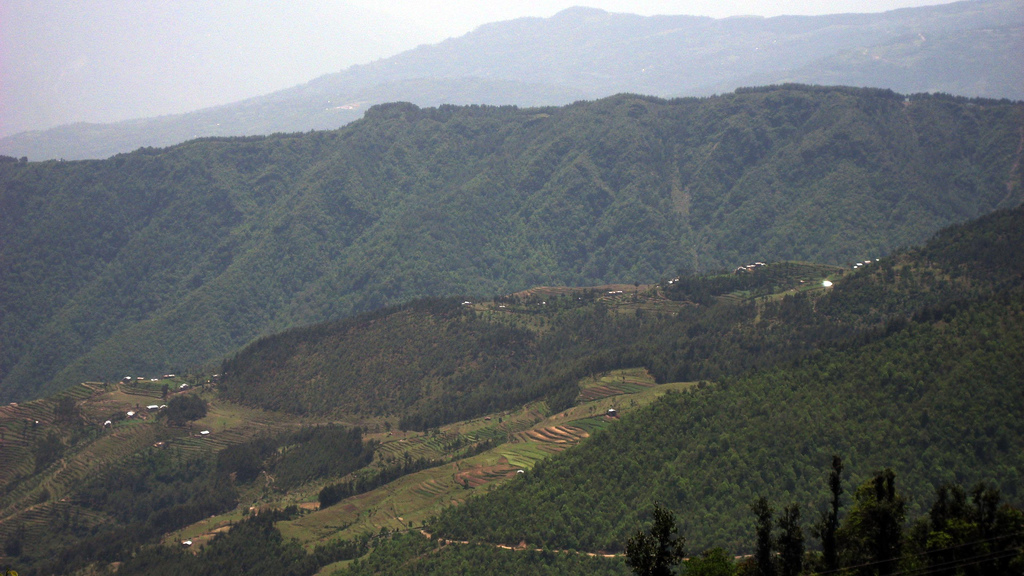
- Babare village

- Location in Nepal Babare (Nepal)
- Coordinates: 27.77°N 86.12°E
- Country: Nepal
- Province: Bagmati Province
- District: Dolakha District
- Rural Municipality: Kalinchowk Rural Municipality
- Ward No.: 2
- Established: 2017

Government
  - Type: Ward council
  - councillor: Nani Pandey
  - Ward Secretary: Gigmi Tamang

Area
  - Total: 16.67 km^{2} (6.44 sq mi)

Population (2011)
  - Total: 3,533
  - Density: 211.9/km^{2} (548.9/sq mi)
- Time zone: UTC+5:45 (Nepal Time)
- Website: kalinchowkmun.gov.np/content/%E0%A4%B5%E0%A4%A1%E0%A4%BE-%E0%A4%A8%E0%A4%82-%E0%A5%A8-%E0%A4%AC%E0%A4%BE%E0%A4%AC%E0%A4%B0%E0%A5%87

Babare (Nepali: बाबरे) is a village (previously: VDC) in Kalinchowk Rural Municipality in Dolakha District in the Bagmati Province of north-eastern Nepal. At the time of the 1991 Nepal census it had a population of 3,392 people living in 739 individual households.

This village is now a ward (ward no. 2) of Kalinchowk Rural Municipality. It has 16.67 square kilometres (6.44 sq mi) of area and total population according to 2011 Nepal census is 3,533 Individuals.
