= Sundrawati =

Sundrawati सुन्दरावती
- Village development committee
- Location in Nepal
- Coordinates: 27.72°N 86.08°E
- Country: Nepal
- Zone: Janakpur Zone
- District: Dolakha District

Population (1991)
  - Total: 2,570
- Time zone: UTC+5:45 (Nepal Time)

Sundrawati is a village development committee in Dolakha District in the Janakpur Zone of north-eastern Nepal. At the time of the 1991 Nepal census it had a population of 2,570 people living in 500 individual households.
