= Lapilang =

Lapilang लापिलाङ
- Village development committee
- Location in Nepal
- Coordinates: 27.74°N 86.09°E
- Country: Nepal
- Zone: Janakpur Zone
- District: Dolakha District

Population (1991)
  - Total: 3,959
- Time zone: UTC+5:45 (Nepal Time)

Lapilang is a village development committee in Dolakha District in the Janakpur Zone of north-eastern Nepal. At the time of the 1991 Nepal census it had a population of 3,959 people living in 901 individual households.
