= Godawari, Lalitpur =

Municipality in Bagmati Province, Nepal

Godawari गोदावरी
- Municipality (नगरपालिका)
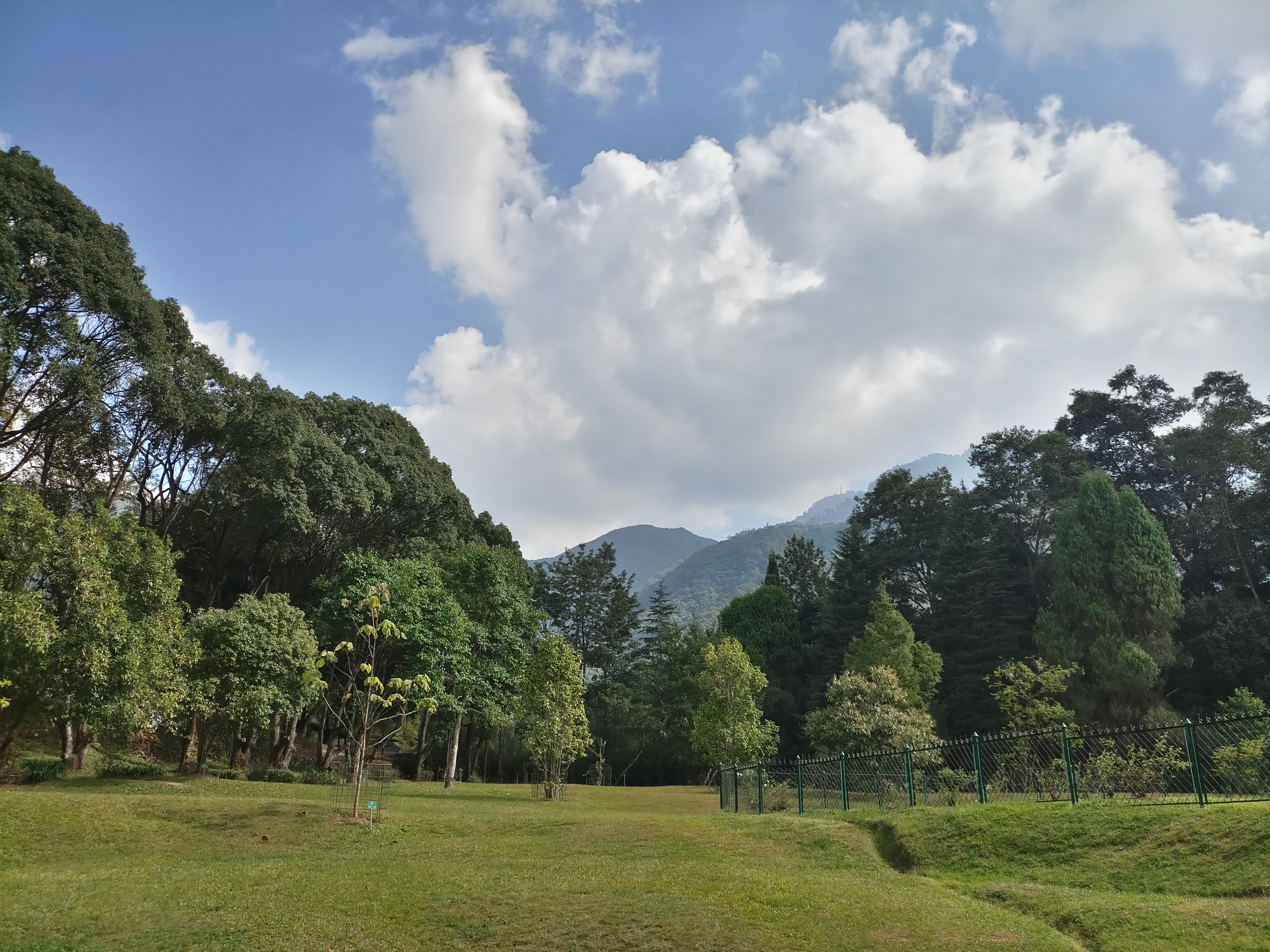

- Location in Nepal Godawari (Nepal)
- Coordinates: 27.6°N 85.37°E
- Country: Nepal
- Province: Bagmati
- District: Lalitpur
- Established: December 2014
- Expanded: March 2017

Government
  - Type: Mayor–council government
  - Mayor: Gajendra Maharjan (NC)
  - Deputy Mayor: Muna Adhikari Kunwar (NC)

Area
  - Total: 96.11 km^{2} (37.11 sq mi)

Population (2011 Nepal census)
  - Total: 78,301
  - Density: 814.7/km^{2} (2,110/sq mi)
- Website: godawarimun.gov.np

Godawari is a municipality in Lalitpur District in Bagmati Province of Nepal. It was established on 2 December 2014 by merging the former Village development committees Godawari, Badikhel, Bisankhunarayan, Godamchaur and Thaiba of Lalitpur District of Bagmati Zone. The municipality area was again expanded in March 2017 to include in total 12 previous VDCs. The six VDCs added were Devichaur, Dukuchhap, Chhampi, Thecho, Chapagaun, Jharuwarasi and Lele. The centre of this municipality is located at Bajrabarahi.

== Demographics ==
At the time of the 2011 Nepal census, Godawari Municipality had a population of 80,376. Of these, 49.7% spoke Nepali, 27.5% Newar, 15.3% Tamang, 2.4% Pahari, 1.0% Danwar, 0.9% Magar, 0.6% Maithili, 0.6% Rai, 0.3% Bhojpuri, 0.2% English, 0.2% Gurung, 0.2% Limbu, 0.2% Tharu, 0.1% Hindi, 0.1% Sherpa, 0.1% Sunuwar and 0.2% other languages as their first language.

In terms of ethnicity/caste, 28.6% were Newar, 26.8% Chhetri, 16.2% Tamang, 10.8% Hill Brahmin, 4.3% Pahari, 2.7% Magar, 1.9% Sarki, 1.3% Kami, 1.1% Damai/Dholi, 1.1% Danuwar, 1.1% Rai, 0.6% Sanyasi/Dasnami, 0.4% Gurung, 0.4% Tharu, 0.2% Bhote, 0.2% other Dalit, 0.2% Limbu, 0.2% Majhi, 0.2% Musalman, 0.1% Badi, 0.1% Dhanuk, 0.1% Gharti/Bhujel, 0.1% Hajam/Thakur, 0.1% Sherpa, 0.1% Sunuwar, 0.1% Teli, 0.1% other Terai, 0.1% Thakuri, 0.1% Thami, 0.1% Yadav and 0.2% others.

In terms of religion, 80.6% were Hindu, 13.9% Buddhist, 4.8% Christian, 0.4% Muslim, 0.3% Kirati and 0.1% others.

In terms of literacy, 75.0% could read and write, 1.6% could only read and 23.3% could neither read nor write.

== Landmarks ==
Godawari is one of the popular hiking destinations in Nepal for its rich wildlife and splendid environment. Godawari is also famous for its botanical garden and Godawari temple (Kunda and navadhara). Mt. Phulchowki is located in Godawari which is the highest peak in Kathmandu valley.

== Media ==
To promote local culture, Godawari one FM radio station ECR FM - 104.2 MHz, which is a Community Radio Station.
