= Depukhu =

Newar festival in Nepal

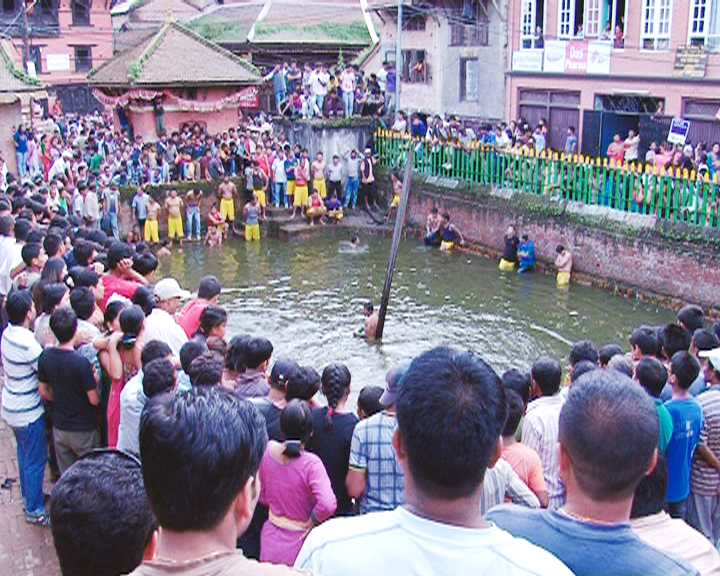
Crowd gathers around the deopokhari pond to observe Depukhu.

Depukhu (Nepali: द्यःपुखू), also De pukhu or Dyo pukhu in Newar language, Deopokhari festival in English, and Deopokhari jatra in Nepali, is a festival celebrated in August each year by the Newar community of Khokana in central Nepal. It involves the ritual sacrifice of a virgin she-goat (often a kid) in the Deopokhari pond which is on the premises of Rudrayani temple in Khokana, in a process described as inhumane and barbaric by animal rights activists. Once taken as a matter of cultural pride, international outcry and criticism have led the locals to attempt to reform the festival in recent years.

== Background and introduction ==
The tradition of the festival is believed to have begun around the 12th century. According to folklore, as the number of deaths by slipping and falling into the pond rose, the belief that an angry supernatural being inhabited the pond began to take hold. Consequently, the festival begun with sacrifice of a virgin she-goat once a year to the demon or angry god that resides in the pond, so that people using the pond are spared for the rest of the year. The festival is celebrated annually the day after Gaijatra, which is mid-August, by the Newar community in and around the ancient village of Khokana in Lalitpur District.

== Goat sacrifice ritual ==
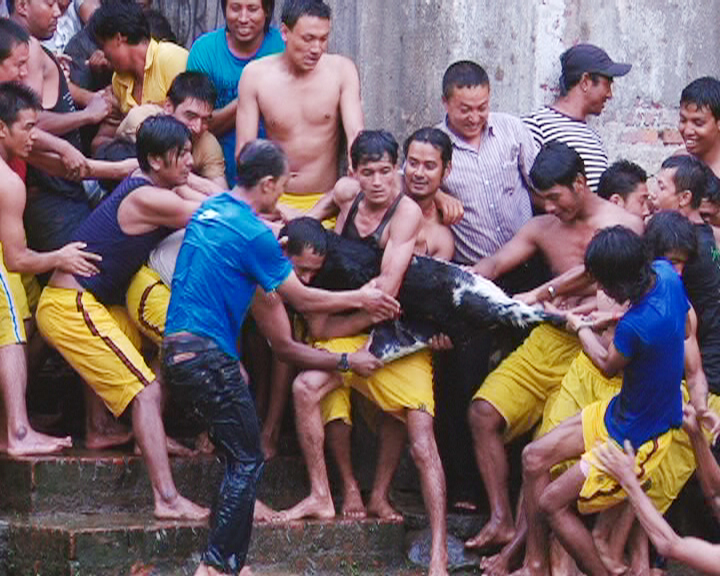
Young men compete for the possession of the carcass of the goat that was sacrificed by drowning in the pond.

While a huge crowd gathers around the pond and on rooftops to watch the ritual, a young man jumps into the pond with a live young female goat on his shoulders. While he attempts to drown the goat, other young men from various communities in and around Khokana join him. They work together to prevent the goat from escaping. While the group tries to drown the goat, the youths also bite her with their teeth, and attempt to rip her apart with their bare hands. The goat is reported to struggle for as long as forty minutes before she dies. Once the goat is dead, a competition ensues for the possession of the carcass. Youths from different communities struggle to win it for their community, which earns them the privilege of leading the religious procession that follows. The struggle and tug-of-war for the possession of the carcass is reported to last as long as 90 minutes. The youths that win lead a procession out of the pond, concluding the ritual sacrifice.

== Controversy ==
In recent years, animal rights activists have opposed the festival for causing unnecessary suffering to an innocent animal, calling it barbaric and inhumane. The organising committee has repeatedly appealed not to bring the festival into controversy as it is a very old tradition and a part of the local community's cultural heritage. Some in the community have advocated continuing the festival in its traditional form, terming it "Khokana's pride" while others have advocated change arguing that the festival had tarnished Khokana's reputation at the world stage.

== Attempted reforms ==
Some years before 2013, an attempt was reportedly made to replace goat sacrifice with a symbolic sacrifice of a pumpkin brought from Rudrayani temple, but it had minimal impact as the tradition continued unchanged.

Setopati reported that, in 2017, the sacrifice ritual was different from years before. While the kid was still drowned by a group of youths, there was no additional violence done upon her before or after her death.
