= Balkumari temple =

Temple in Lalitpur, Nepal

Balkumari Temple
- बालकुमारी मन्दिर
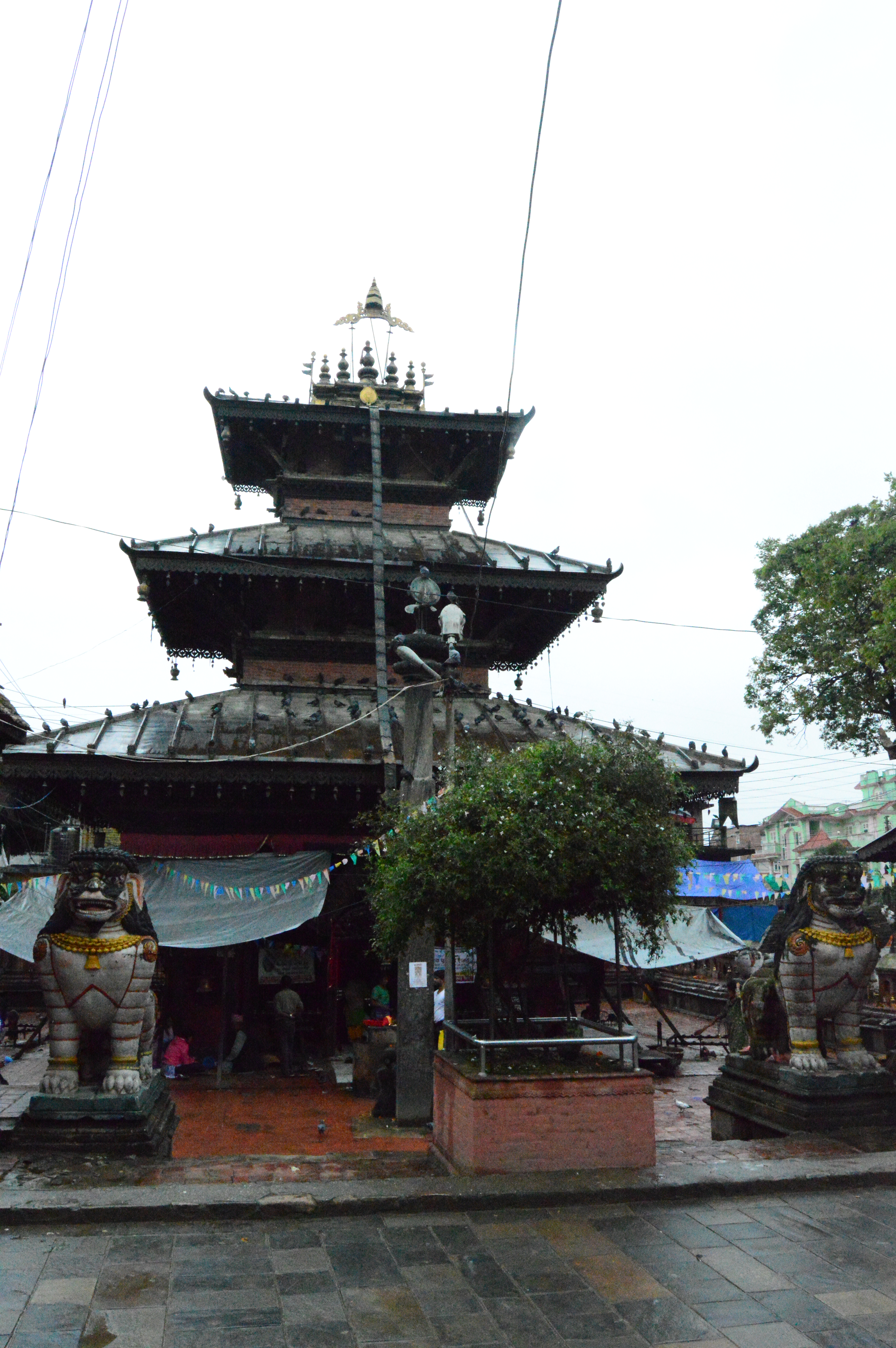

- Location in Nepal

Religion
- Affiliation: Hinduism
- District: Lalitpur District

Location
- Country: Nepal
- Interactive map of Balkumari Temple
- Coordinates: 27.6719°N 85.3341°E

Architecture
- Type: Pagoda

Balkumari Temple (Nepali: बालकुमारी मन्दिर) is located in Lalitpur District in Nepal. The origin of temple is controversial, but is supposed to have been built between 7 and 17th century. There is a pond near the temple which has been filled with silt and is under restoration. Balkumari Maa (Goddess) is one of the form of Astamatrikas.

The original idol of Balkumari was stolen twice in history, once the idol was put inside an aeroplane in TIA (Tribhuvan International Airport) but due to some reason the aircraft could not take off and the idol was found and brought back with huge celebration and put inside the Balkumari Temple in Tyagal, Lalitpur. The original idol is worshiped and carried upon the small chariot (Khat) during Swosthani Katha Sapati and Paaha chare (Ghode Jatra) and jatra tour in some areas of Patan. The tour is arranged by 8 people group (Guthi) residents of Pilachhen. The duplicate copy is handled by Deula community in Tyagal, which is on display every Saturday in Balkumari Mandir Temple.

The temple is a starting point of Pyakhaa Jatra which ends after 3 days in Sunakothi. The festival occurs after about a month from Holi.

== See also ==
- List of Hindu temples in Nepal
