= Buddha Air Flight 103 =

2011 aviation accident

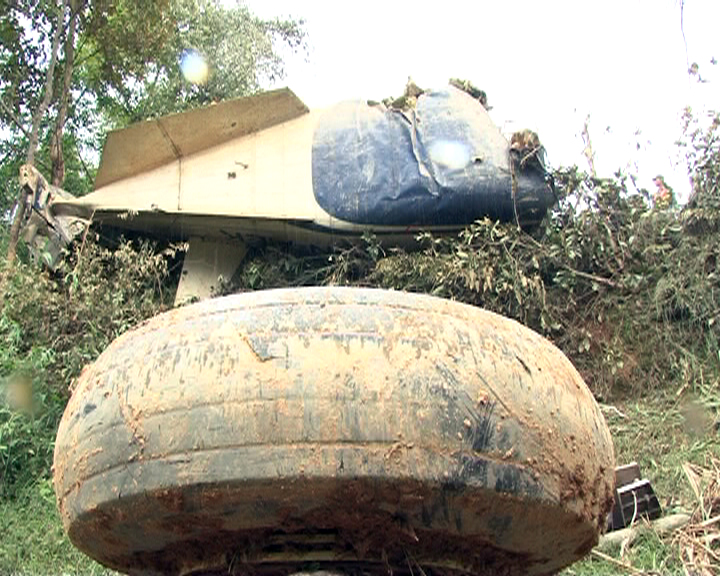
- Gear and empennage at the crash site

Accident
- Date: 25 September 2011
- Summary: Controlled flight into terrain due to pilot error
- Site: Kotdanda, Lalitpur, Nepal; 27°37′31″N 85°22′28″E

Aircraft
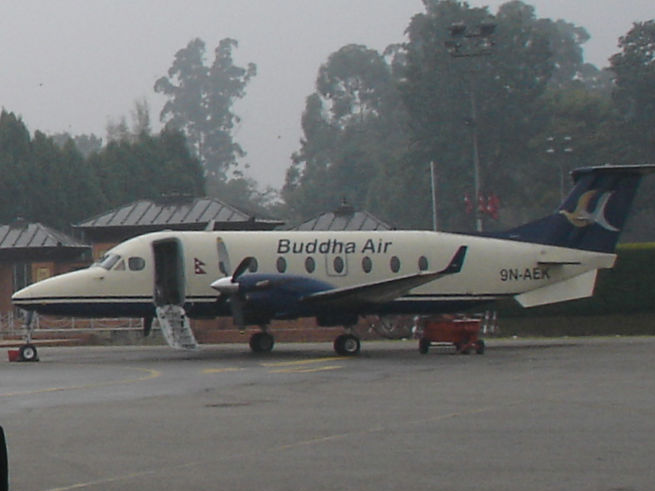
- 9N-AEK, the aircraft involved in the accident, seen in 2005
- Aircraft type: Beechcraft 1900D
- Operator: Buddha Air
- Call sign: BUDDHA AIR 103
- Registration: 9N-AEK
- Flight origin: Tribhuvan International Airport, Kathmandu, Nepal
- Destination: Tribhuvan International Airport
- Occupants: 19
- Passengers: 16
- Crew: 3
- Fatalities: 19 (initially 18)
- Survivors: 0 (initially 1)

On 25 September 2011, Buddha Air Flight 103, a Beechcraft 1900 commuter aircraft, crashed near Lalitpur, Nepal, while attempting to land in poor weather at nearby Kathmandu Airport. All 19 passengers and crew on board were killed. The aircraft, operated by Buddha Air, was on a sightseeing flight to Mount Everest.

== Aircraft ==
The aircraft was a 19-seat Beechcraft 1900D twin-engine turboprop airliner; it was 13 years old and registered in Nepal as 9N-AEK. It was powered by two Pratt & Whitney Canada PT6A-67D turboprop engines.

== Accident ==
Initial investigations revealed that the aircraft was being operated under VFR (Visual Flight Rules); and two minutes before it was due to land it entered clouds and crashed at 5,400 feet (1,600 m). Air traffic controllers and members of the investigation team claim the reason for the crash was pilot error.

A resident of Bisankhunarayan reported that the aircraft had struck the roof of a house in the village before crashing. At the time of the accident, visibility was poor due to the presence thick fog in the mountainous area.

== Passengers ==
The 16 passengers included 10 Indian nationals, one Japanese, two Americans and three Nepalese.

== Investigation ==
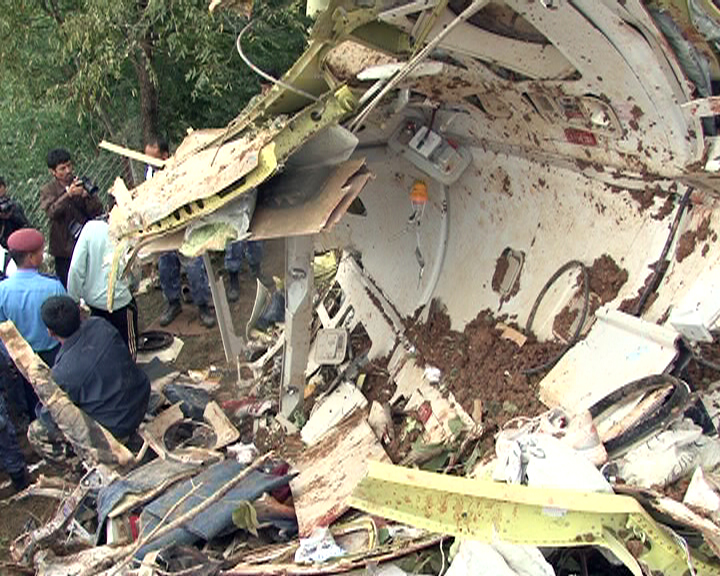
Investigators examine the wreckage of the plane.

A Nepali aviation agency found that the first officer only had 18 hours of flying experience in the type. The aircraft entered a cloud bank two minutes before landing and was flying at 5,000 feet instead of the 6,000 feet assigned at that area. The aircraft lost altitude, struck trees, and crashed into the ground.

The captain was assigned to the accident flight on the day of the accident on short notice, but he had not gotten enough rest, having flown the previous day. Investigators determined that, due to the resulting fatigue, the captain had assigned flight duties to the first officer despite her limited flight experience.

The crew did not adhere to standard operating procedures (SOPs), which required the aircraft to fly above 6,000 feet (1,800 m) in the accident area. Crew coordination was deficient as the captain had frequently distracted the first officer with advice rather than explaining the procedures to her.

Investigators required all airlines to install ground proximity warning systems (GPWS) on their aircraft and issued eight other safety recommendations regarding pilot training and the installation of visual flight aids.

== See also ==
- List of accidents and incidents involving commercial aircraft
- Beechcraft 1900
- Buddha Air
