= Khokana =

Part of lalitpur Metropolitant in Bagmati Zone, Nepal

Khokana खोना Jitapur
- part of lalitpur Metropolitant
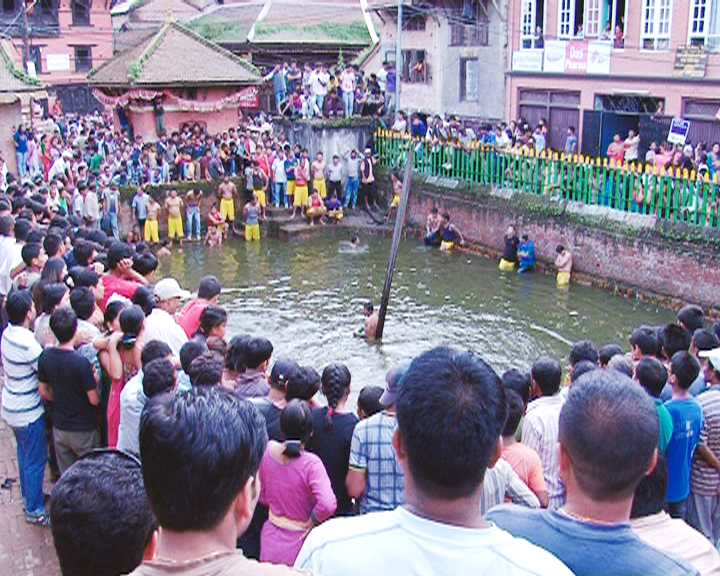
- Dyo Pukhu Jatra
- Nickname: land of oil/ khona
- Location in Nepal
- Coordinates: 27.64°N 85.29°E
- Country: Nepal
- Zone: Bagmati Zone
- District: Lalitpur District

Population (2011)
  - Total: 12,786
- Time zone: UTC+5:45 (NST)

Khokana is a former Village Development Committee (VDC) which has been merged with the neighbouring VDCs of Bungamati, Chhampi, Dukuchhap, Sainbu and 38 other VDCs to form the Metropolitan City of Lalitpur in Lalitpur District in the Bagmati Zone of central Nepal. At the time of the 1991 Nepal census, Khokana had a population of 4258 living in 699 individual households. According to 2011 Nepal census, Khokana had a population of 4927 people in 1056 households.

Khokana is a traditional and small Newari village about 8 kilometers south of Kathmandu (on the outskirts of Patan). Khokana is mainly known for the production of rich mustard oil since ancient time. It was also the first town in Nepal to be lit with electricity in 1911 AD during the reign of Rana Prime Minister Chandra Shamsher.

Khokana has been nominated to be listed as a Unesco World Heritage, representing a vernacular village and its mustard-oil seed industrial heritage.

== Legends / History ==
The main Rudrayani temple is said to be reconstructed by King Amara Malla in 15th century. It is said that the Maharjans and Dangols of Pachali Bhairav have migrated to present location of Khokana as proven by many similarities in the cultures and traditions of people of both locations. It is said that King Amar Malla reconstructed temple of Rudrayani to cure epidemics which used to spread in mediaeval times. He also named the settlement as Jitapur.

Khokana was a specialized town for oil pressing. The town is first to be lit from the Pharping Hydropower during the period of Prime minister Chandra Shamshere. Rudrayani Madhyamik Vidyalaya is the oldest school in Nepal after Durbar High School. Prior to construction of motorable road through Pharping, people used to walk through this village to go to Dakshinkali temple.

=== Etymology ===
There is an interesting story among the people about how 'Khokana' got it names. The word’ Khokana’ is derived from the Newari word ‘khona’ which means ‘Telling while Weeping’. According to the legend, A Maharjan priest of Pachali bhairav of Kathmnandu fainted due to high cold fever. He was then taken to the bank of Bagmati River for cremation thinking that he was dead. He along with his wife was placed in the pyre as 'Sati'.

When the pyre was just alighted, heavy storm with rain occurred and the people who were arranging all the process ran away from the pyre to have shelter. As the pyre burned, the man became conscious and was saved. The people did not allow him and his wife to entre to their respective places fearing of bad omen. The couple then ran from there weeping all the way and finally settled in Kudesh (bad place or country) north-west of present Khokana. It is said that the goddess Shikali Devi blessed them and a new settlement was established. After a while, the people from the opposite bank of the river started harassing them and for the safety purpose, they shifted towards high ground east of Kudesh. This settlement started by a weeping [Khona in Newari] woman is said to be origin of the name of the Khokana. The place Kudesh is just a ruin now without any inhabitants and might been important place from the archaeological point of view.

In the center is a three-storey temple, Sri Rudrayani, with a particularly wide main street, especially for a village of such small size.

== Landmarks / Places of Interest ==
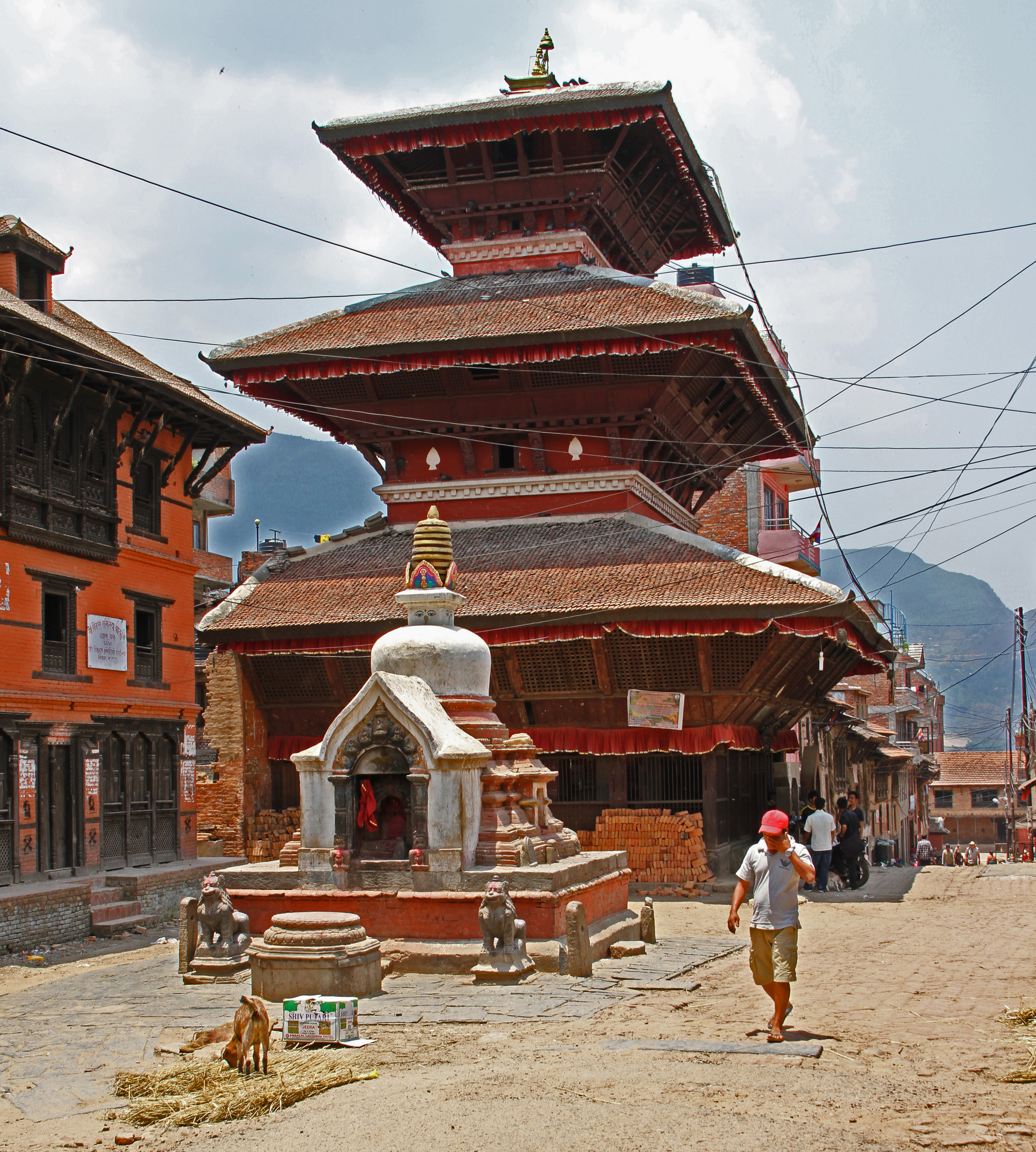
Khokana Rudrayani temple

=== Rudrayani Temple ===
The Rudrayani temple is a dominant three storeyed tiered temple located in the Chwe Lachi square in Khokana. It is the temple of Goddess Rudrayani worshipped as the manifestation of Goddess Durga and the mother goddess of the town. The temple's most distinctive architectural feature is its highly projected inclined lattice work in the second storey. The temple was constructed during the reign of Amar Malla during 1570 B.S (1513 AD).

Rudrayani jatra is performed every year in the month of October on the first 7 days of Dashain festival. The permanent people of Khokana does not celebrate the Dashain festival, they celebrate their own Jatra, Sikhali Jatra'.

=== De pukhu ===
It is a big rectangular water pond located in the Chwe Lachi square. During Rudrayani Jatra on Janai Purnima, a group of young men take a swim in the pond where a goat is sacrificed by drowning in this pond. After the death of goat, the group of young men fight for the goat. The culture is that a group that wins the goat should make a cultural drama show "kha pyakha" during Sikhali jatra. The Khokana festival has also drawn widespread criticism and ire from animal sympathisers and animal rights activists for its way of animal sacrifice.

In the past, the water source in the pond used to be from Rajkulo. But in the present context, the water in the Dyo Pukhu dries up during dry season. Water in the pond is usually refilled by the water tanks during festival times. De pukhu means God pond in English. The Rudrayani temple used to be six floors but when an earth quake broke it was destroyed into 3 floors the rest of the parts somehow fell into the pond so it is called De pukhu

=== Other Ponds ===
Besides the De Phukhu, there are other ponds all around Khokana. Most of the ponds were fed by Rajkulo all the way from Tika Bhairab. The major ponds around Khokana includes

1. Kha Pukhu
2. Pala Pukhu
3. Ga Pukhu
4. Kutu Pukhu
5. Dhokasi Pukhu
6. Samal Pukhu
7. Tar Pukhu
8. Phonga Pukhu

=== Jitapur Mandap ===
Jitapur mandap, also known in local language as ‘Gaa-cha’ is a public rest house located in the Kwe-lachi square where major social activities like cultural processions and religious performances are observed. Jitapur mandap is one of the major landmark where the ‘khat’ of the Rudrayani is rested during the Rudrayani jatra. The mandap was completely destroyed during the 2015 Nepal earthquake and was reconstructed in its present shape by Chiri Maya Maharjan (Daughter of Khokana), Kathamandu.

=== Sikali (Sikali) Temple ===
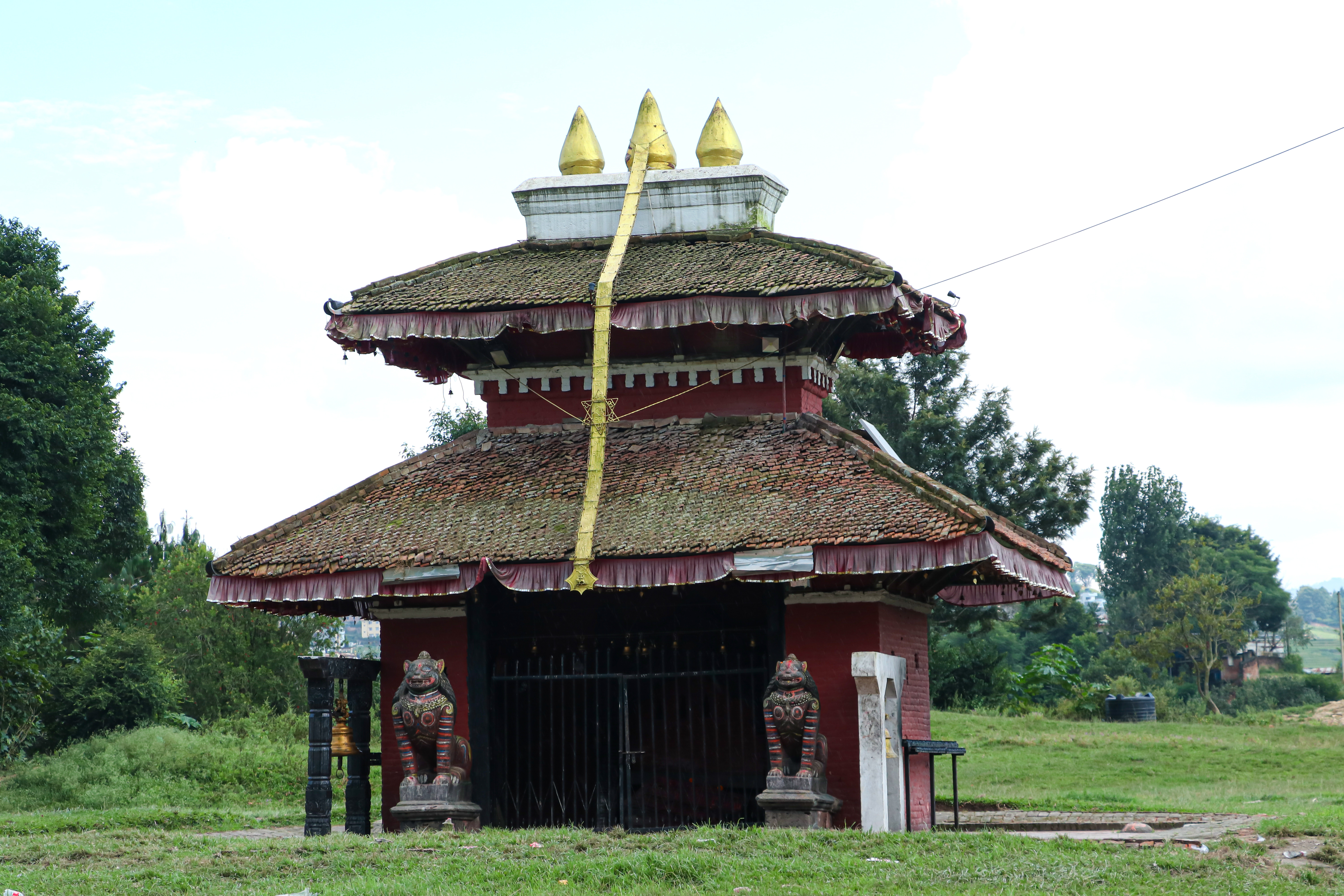
Sikali temple, Khokana, Lalitpur

The temple lies outside the main settlement towards the south at about a 30-minute walk from Rudrayani temple. The temple is located at an isolated area. The original history of Sikhli related with Rudrayani goddess. Goddess was migrated to khokana in satya yug (more than 30000 years ago) due to migration of pachali's people. Pachali's people migrated to khokana to learn some knowledge from Sikha Buddha. Sikha Buddha is commonly known as Shree Khanda Bhawani. Due to Sikha Buddha the sikali is named after him. Where ' Si' is derived from Sikha Buddha. Where 'si' means biggest among all. Where ' kali' means the dangerous form of goddess Rudrayani. So that's why it is called Sikali. The Mother goddess of all.

== Tradition & Culture ==
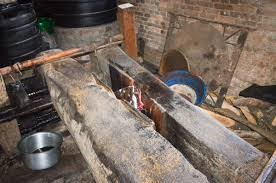
Wooden beam used for extracting Mustard oil

Khokana is known for its mustard-oil harvesting process in which a heavy wooden beam is used to crush the mustard seeds to extract the oil.

Another practice unique to Khokana is that the people here do not keep chickens and hens. Ducks are domesticated instead and can be seen in the pond of Khokana.

=== Festivals and Rituals ===
==== Sikhali Jatra ====
Dedicated to Rudrayani Goddess held twice a year during Gaijatra festival in August and during Dashain in October

==== Jatha puhni Jatra ====
Held in the month of Kartik (October- November) when 14 deity representatives dance and animal sacrifices are made.

==== Gaijatra (Gunhi punhi) ====
Celebrated for two days. On the first day frog is worshipped and after having cereal soup, jatra or the procession begins from Rudrayani temple and on the second day procession completes. Animal sacrifices are made on the second day in Dev pukhu.

==== Khayasanhu ====
Fest of bitten rice is organized in every house to celebrate this festival on the first day of Bikram era (first of Baisakh).

==== Bhimsen Puja ====
Celebrated on the second day of Baisakh. Auditing of yearly accounts of the oil mills and worshipping of Bhimsen deity for prosperity in the future is done.

==== Paha – charhey ====
Celebrated in the month of Chaitra. Mahadev is worshipped and two guthis of the settlement arrange feast for the entire community.

==== Sithi nakha ====
Celebrated in the month of June. This is the main festival of the farmers for cleaning, renewing and renovating the community spaces.

== Gallery ==
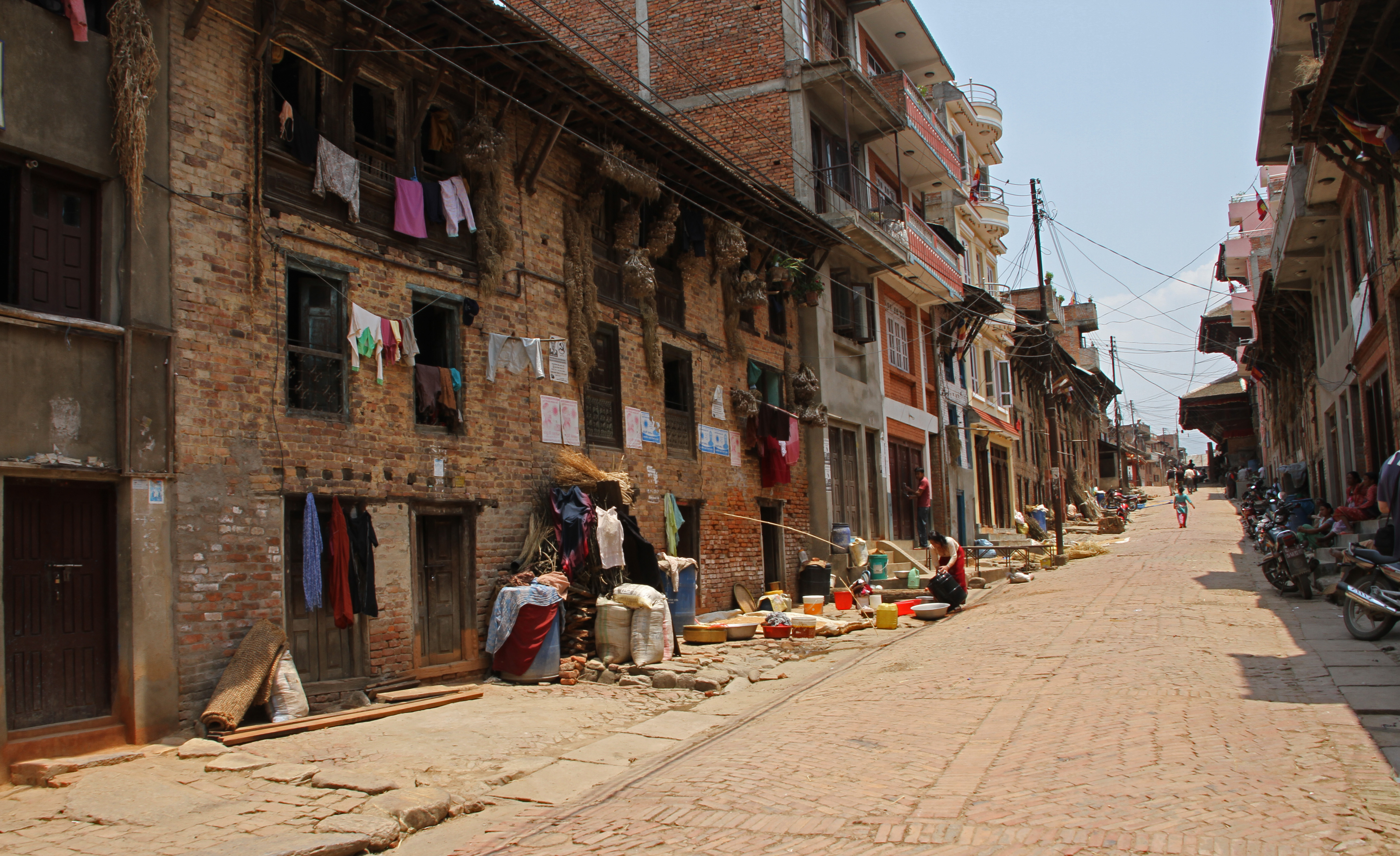
Street in Khokana

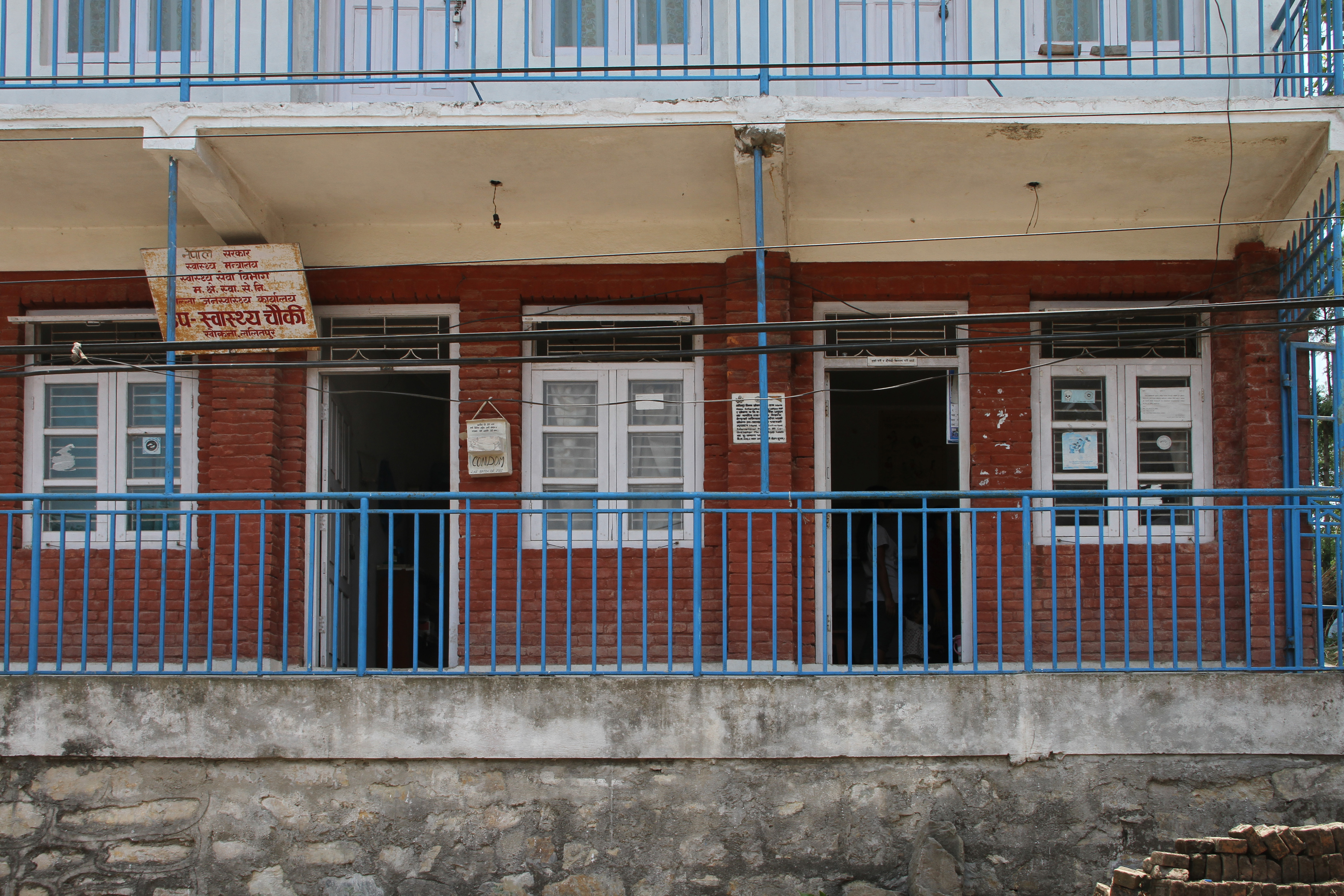
Khokana Sub-Health Post

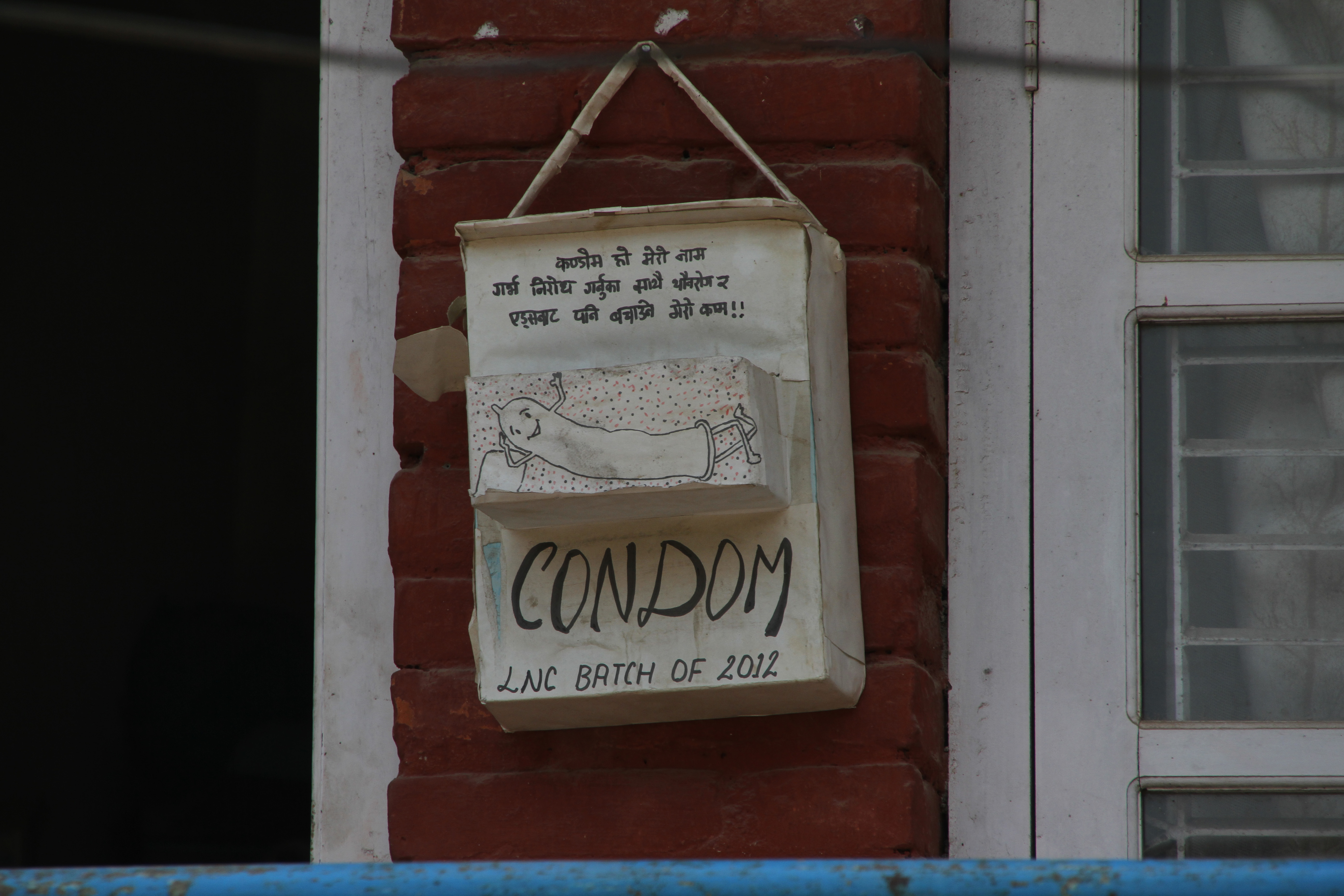
Condom recommendation

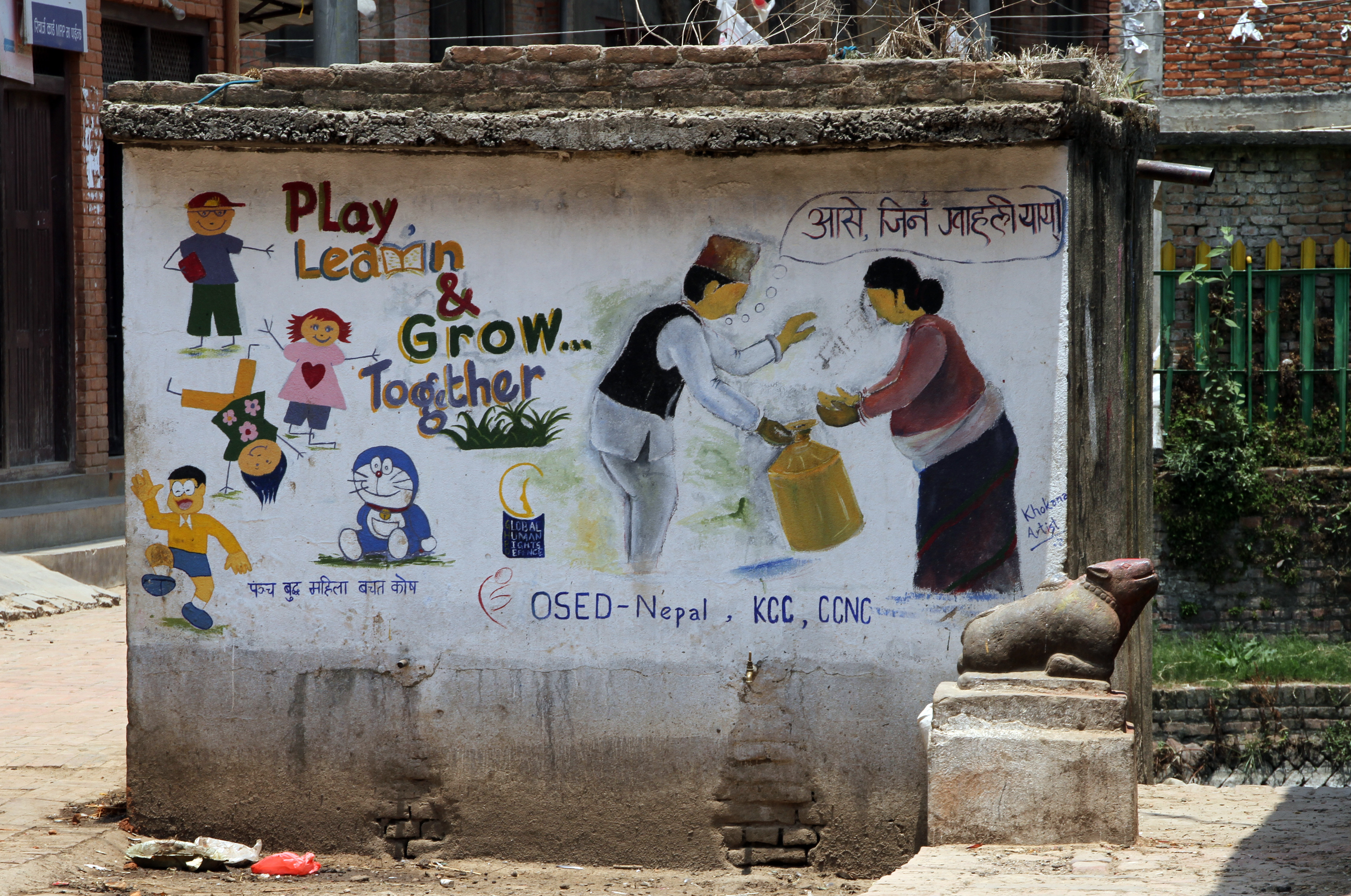
Mural painting for coeducation

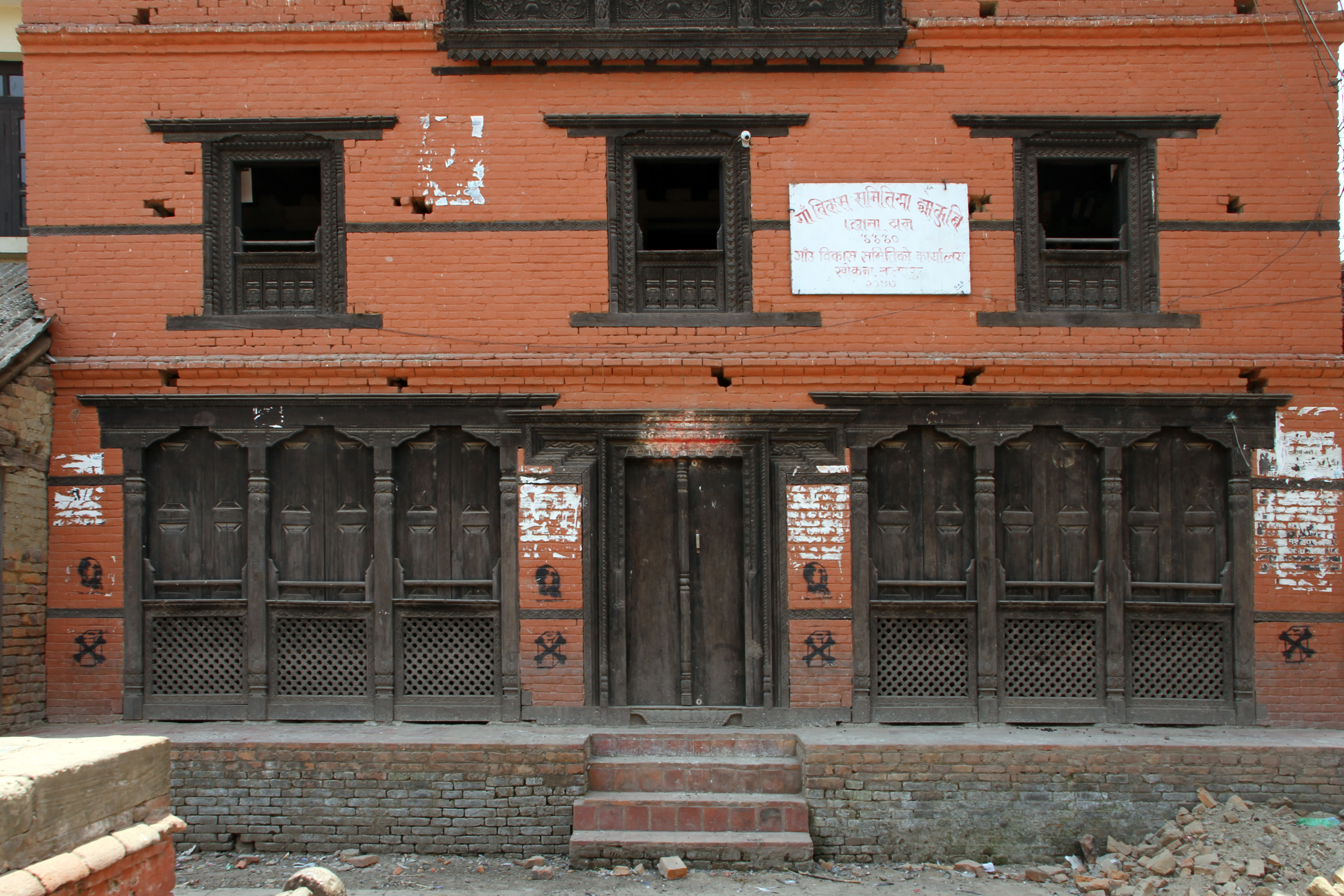
Lalitpur Municipality Ward 21 Office

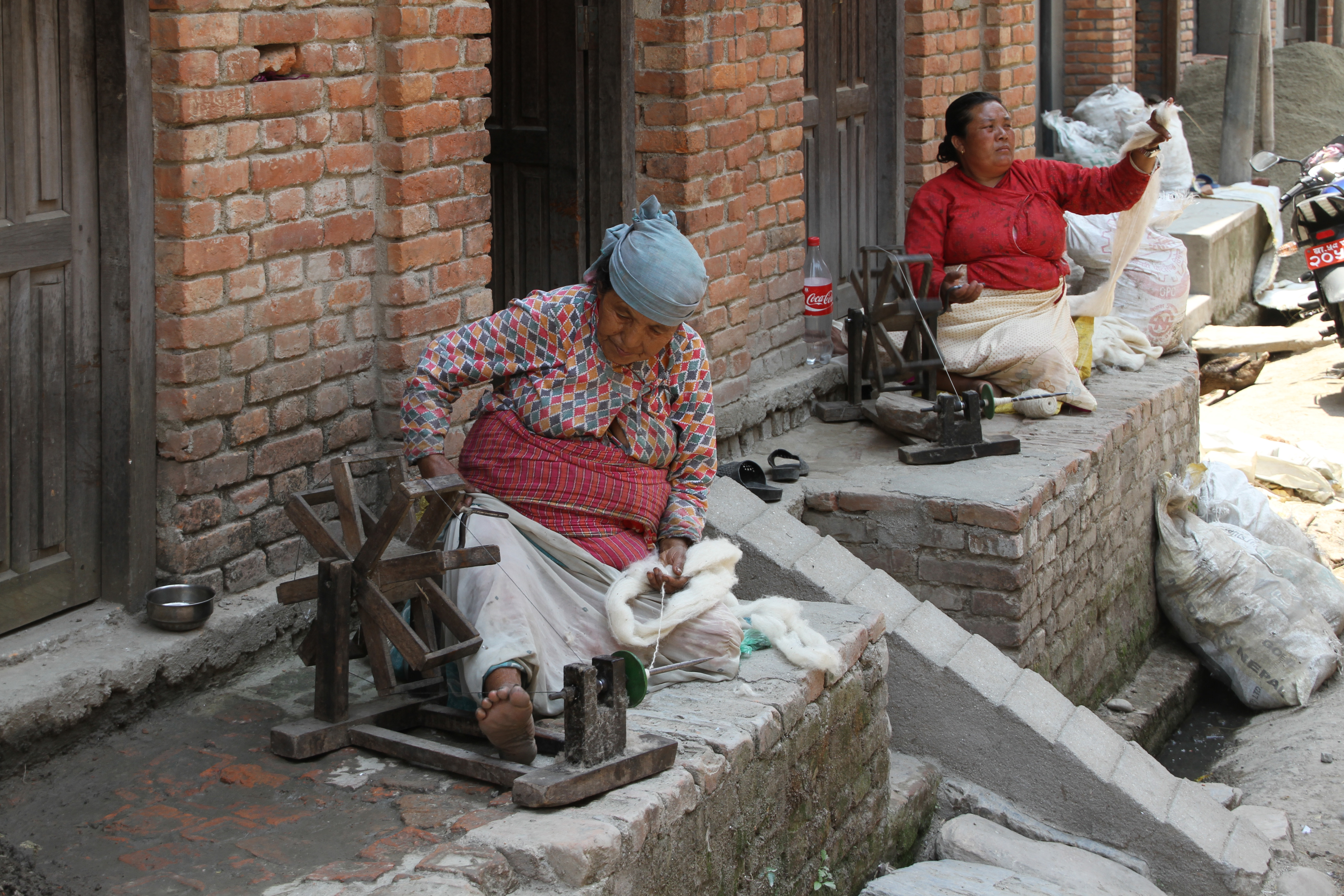
Women at work

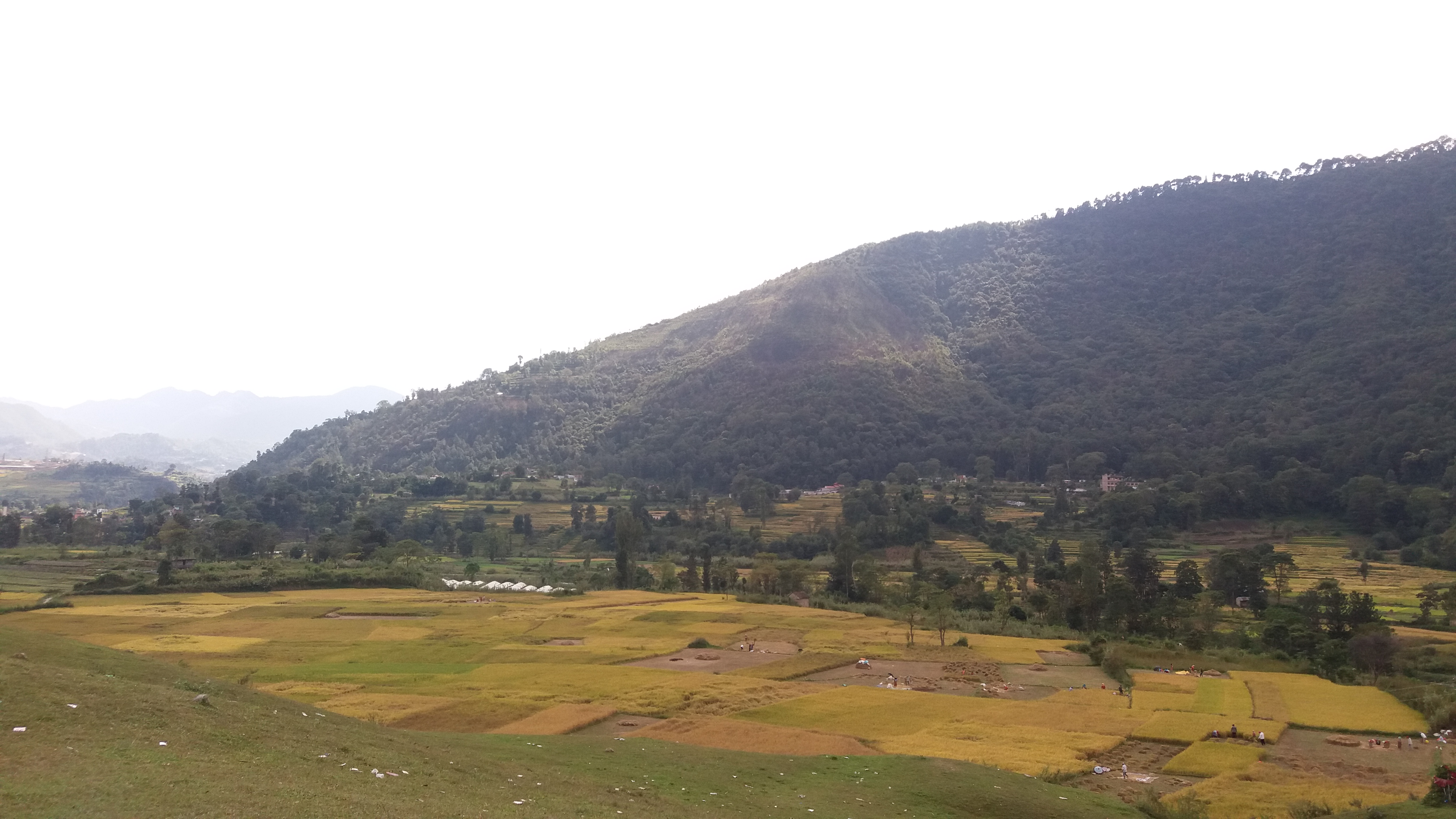
view of golden paddy fields and nearby hill, Khokana, Lalitpur
