= Pyan Gaun =

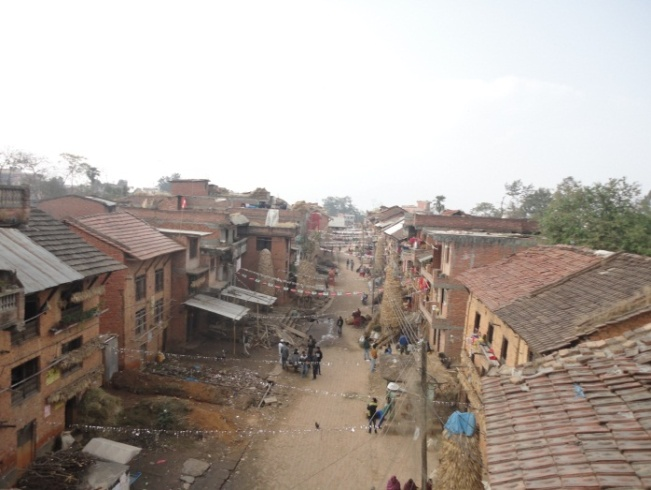
- Pyangaun settlement

- Location within Kathmandu
- 27°35′52.73″N 85°19′31.84″E
- Location: Kathmandu, Nepal

Pyan Gaun, also spelled as Pyangaun, is a settlement that is part of the Chapagaun village development committee in the Lalitpur district of Nepal. It is located 14 km south of Kathmandu. The settlement is renowned for its exceptional craftsmanship in bamboo, particularly in the production of buckets used for measurement.

== Etymology ==
Referred to as Sitapur in ancient times, Pyangaun is a centuries-old crafting village. The settlement's name comes from its distinctive production of bamboo buckets, known as pyang in Nepali. These buckets became regional standard measurements in units called Maana and Pathi. In the past, the village held a monopoly on these buckets in the Kathmandu valley.

== Legend ==
The original inhabitants are believed to be the descendants of Yatsya Malla from Bhaktapur (not to be confused with King Yakshya Malla of the Kathmandu Valley). When the son went to the king to claim his and his mother's rights, the king advised them to work and provided them with a place to stay. The son focused on bamboo crafting, particularly in making measuring instruments for grains. This craft became his profession, and he searched for raw bamboo around the palace.

== Bamboo craft ==
To bring quality bamboos to the village for crafting, workers used to cross the Bagmati river to reach the trail of Chure in the Makwanpur district in the south. In order to prepare buckets of different sizes, they first cut the bamboo into pieces and used fire to flatten it into a mold. The local Shyam Sundar Maharjan quotes,

“There was an adventure in collecting the aged bamboos. The wider the width and the older the age (of the bamboo), the bigger the size of the bucket and the greater its life. The demand for bamboo buckets declined with the advent of plastic and chemical products, so it is useless to go for such a long trekking nowadays. I am still making weighing measures using the bamboo available nearby, but these products are not as strong as they used to be”

Bamboo boxes have long been replaced by standard metal products in urban areas, but were used in rural areas until the 1990s.

== Festivals ==
The major festivals celebrated in Pyan Gaun are Indra Jatra, Nasa Dyo Puja, Mul Jatra during Chaitra Purnima and Gai Jatra.

The main festival of Pyan Gaun is Indra Jatra, when the people of Pyangaun perform a form of dance known as Kug pyakha. The dance used to be taken to Kathmandu to show to the King at Hanuman Dhokha. The festival lasts for four days.
