= Badikhel =

Badikhel बडिखेल
- Village of Godawari Municipality
- Location in Nepal
- Coordinates: 27.59°N 85.35°E
- Country: Nepal
- Province: Province No. 3
- District: Lalitpur District

Population (1991)
  - Total: 2,711
- Time zone: UTC+5:45 (Nepal Time)
- Area code: 524205255023

Badikhel is a village and former Village Development Committee that is now part of Godawari Municipality in Province No. 3 of central Nepal. At the time of the 1991 Nepal census, it had a population of 2,711 in 461 individual households. Bamboo is one of the major natural product of this village.

A local dialect of the Newar language is spoken here. Its native speakers call it Pahari (Pāhāri) or Nagarkote, while to the Newar speakers of neighbouring Patan, it is known as Pahibhāe.
