= Kusunti =

- Ward
- Location in Nepal
- Coordinates: 27.55°N 85.39°E
- Country: Nepal
- Province: Bagmati Province
- District: Lalitpur District

Population (1991)
  - Total: 15,000
- Time zone: UTC+5:45 (Nepal Time)

Kusunti (कुसुन्ती) is a ward in Lalitpur, a sub-metropolitan city in Nepal. It is bordered by the Nakkhu River and the Ring Road. It is well known as the site of Pancheswor Mahadev temple (पञ्चेश्वर महादेव).

== History ==
Kumār Rājā is considered one of the 12 "true power-places" of Lalitpur.

Devotees from around the country visit the temple of Pancheswor Mahadev, where a large monument of Lord Shiva was excavated.

== People ==
The native residents belong to different castes including Limbu, Bogati, Dhungana, KC, Gajurel and Khadka. There are also many indigenous people of Nepal. The population of Kusunti in 1991 is about 15000.

In March 2024, the construction of a disabled friendly bridge over the ring road at Kusunti was started by the Lalitpur Metropolitan city authorities.

In July 2021, organisations of Indigenous Peoples of Nepal gave a joint statement seeking implementation of their right to self determination. The signatories included two Kusunti organisations, Nepal Federation of Indigenous Nationalities and National Indigenous Disabled Women Association Nepal.

The Center for Research on Environment Health and Population Activities founded by Anand Tamang is in Kusunti.
