= Yala Newa International School =

School in Nepal

Information
- Gender: Mixed
- Language: Nepal Bhasa

Yala Newa International School is a Nepal Bhasa-medium school. It is a co-educational institution registered with the District Education Office of Lalitpur, Nepal. The aim of the school is to improve the students' Nepal Bhasa skills, as well as to make them understand their mother tongue clearly.
