= Harisiddhi =

Harisiddhi हरिसिद्धि Jestapur
- Municipality
- Nickname: Jala
- Location in Nepal
- Coordinates: 27.64°N 85.35°E
- Country: Nepal
- Zone: Bagmati Zone
- District: Lalitpur District

Population (1991)
  - Total: 4,116
- Time zone: UTC+5:45 (Nepal Time)
- Website: ourharisiddhi.com

Harisiddhi is a municipality in Lalitpur District in the Bagmati Zone of central Nepal. At the time of the 1991 Nepal census it had a population of 4116 living in 754 individual households.
