= Thaiba =

badagaou barmay
- Village of Godawari Municipality
- Location in Nepal
- Coordinates: 27.62°N 85.35°E
- Country: Nepal
- Province: Province No. 3
- District: Lalitpur District

Population (1991)
  - Total: 4,500
- Time zone: UTC+5:45 (Nepal Time)

Thaiba is a village and former Village Development Committee that is now part of Godawari Municipality in Province No. 3 of central Nepal. At the time of the 1991 Nepal census it had a population of 4,500 living in 805 individual households among which most of the population is inhabited by newars, the dominant population group of kathmandu valley. Here is a great problem of safe drinking water as it does not have clean and fresh water resources. People depend on a tap water provided by the government.
