= Chyasal =

Chyasal / Chyasa: च्यासल / च्यास:
- neighbourhood
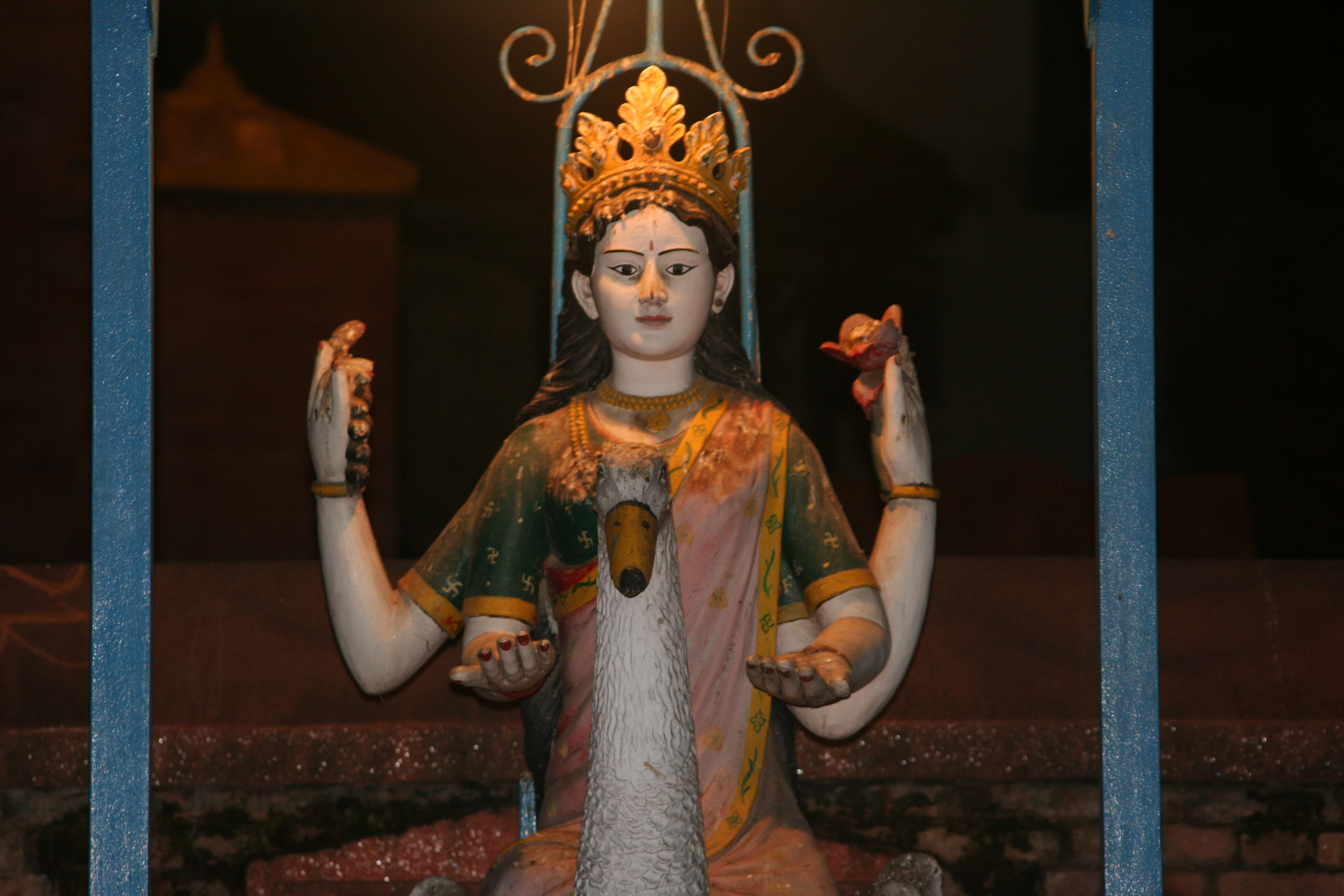
- Chyasal Saraswati Hiti, Town center
- Country: Nepal
- District: Lalitpur
- City: Lalitpur

Area
  - Total: 0 km^{2} (0 sq mi)

Population
  - Total: 0

Chyasal (Nepal Bhasa:च्यास:) is an ancient town in the District of Lalitpur in Bagmati Zone in Nepal and a section of the city of Lalitpur. Also known as Yala in Nepal Bhasa. 800 Kiratis are said to have been slain in this Dabu by Lichhavis. Yalamber was a Kirat King who settled in Nepal mainly in Ye (Kathmandu Valley) and surrounding region of Khopa (Bhaktapur) and Yala (Lalitpur).

== History ==
This ancient town, north post of Yala or Patan City, was a final battlefield for Kiratas and Lichhavis. About 250 A.D., Lichhavis attacked this post killing 800 Kiratas who were guarding at the post. In newari language, 800 means chyasa and the town was named chyasa. Later, it was pronounced as Chyasal.

Chyasal is famous for its preserved, traditional culture. The main occupation of the residents of this place is Agriculture and business. Nowadays, the trend is shifting and more and more people are attracted towards service based occupation.

Chyasal has been conserving its cultural heritage and rituals over thousands of years now. Many festivals, the ancient rituals and ancient heritage are also preserved and are kept safe in conservation.

== Location ==
It is situated at north of Patan Durbar Square (Patan Palace) about distance of 500 meters and ends at Bagmati river.

== Main Sights ==
Attraction in this town are historic stone water spouts, sculptures of god and goddess, Ganesh temple, ponds, etc. There are only two temples with three-faced Ganesh idol (Swapakhwa Ganesh). One is in Chyasal tole and another is in Pulchowk .

The main inhabitant of Chyasal is from Newar community with surnames Byanjankar, Awale, Shakya, Maharjan, Khadgi and Shrestha.

== Religion ==
Hinduism and Buddhism.

== Sports ==
Chyasal Youth Club aims to engage in "Sports for health and fitness for the community and national pride". The club owns its own football stadium.

== Gallery ==
च्यासल हिटी

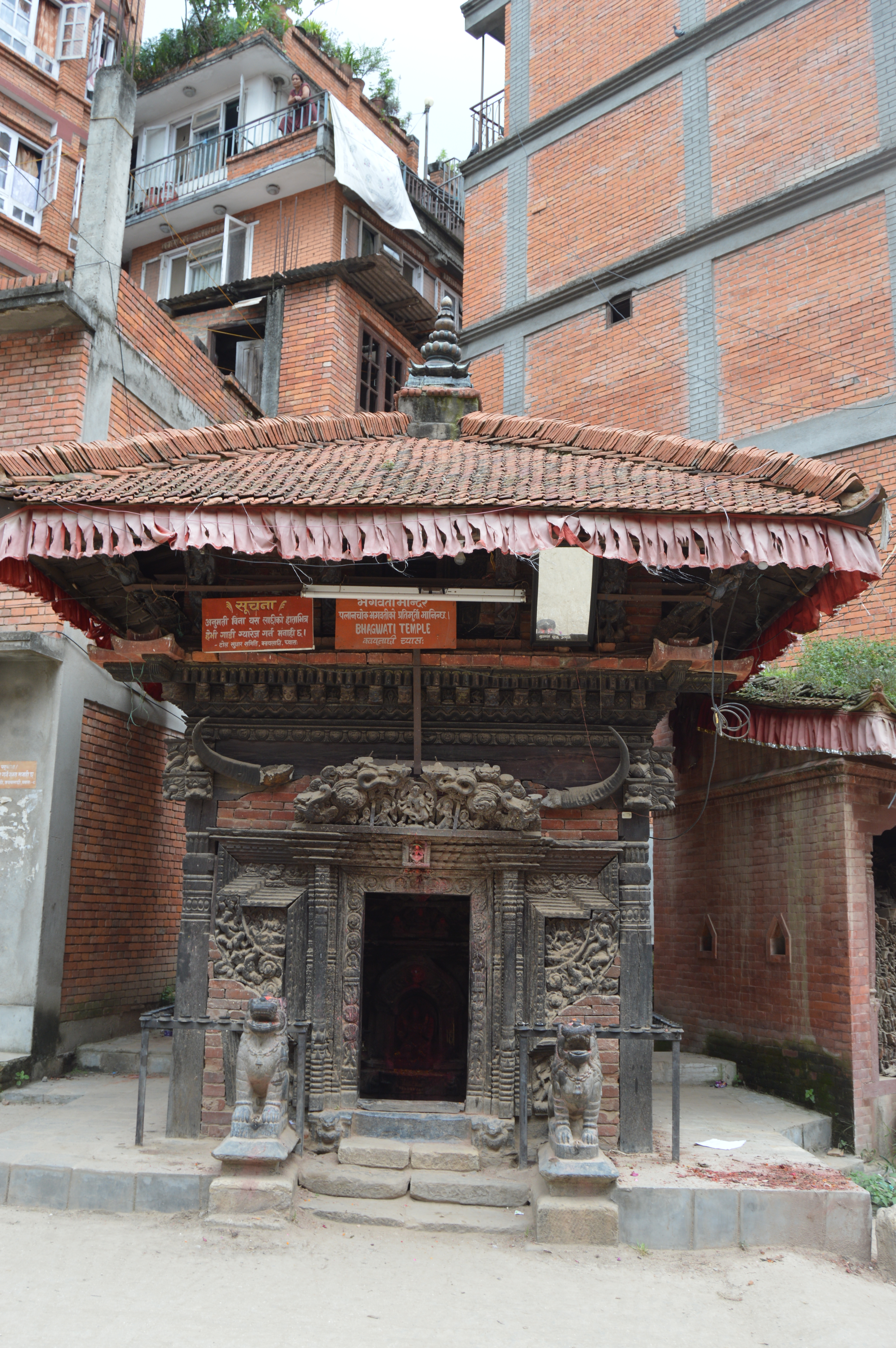
Bhagwati Temple

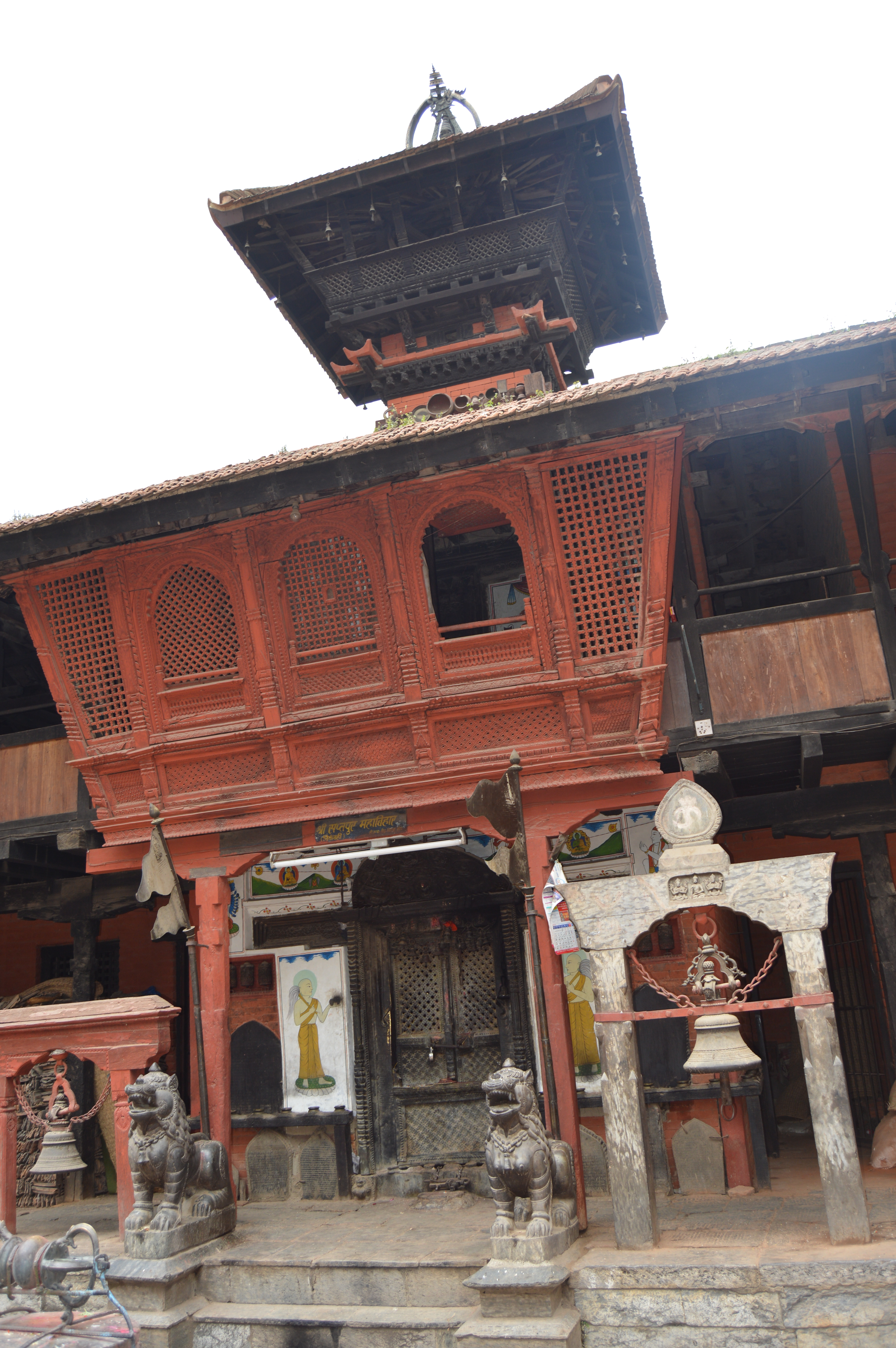
Shree Saptapur Mahabihar

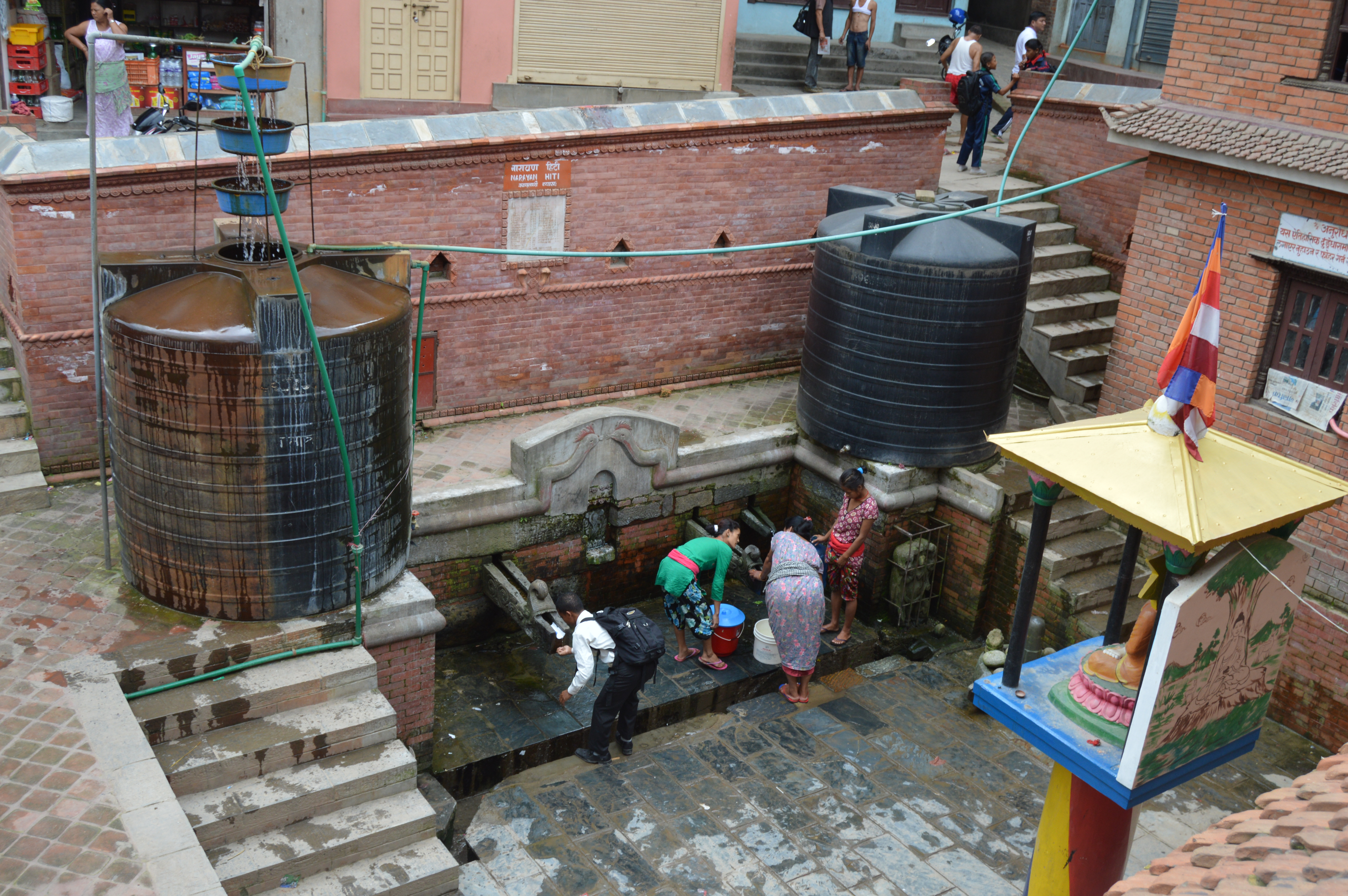
Narayan Hiti Kwelacchi

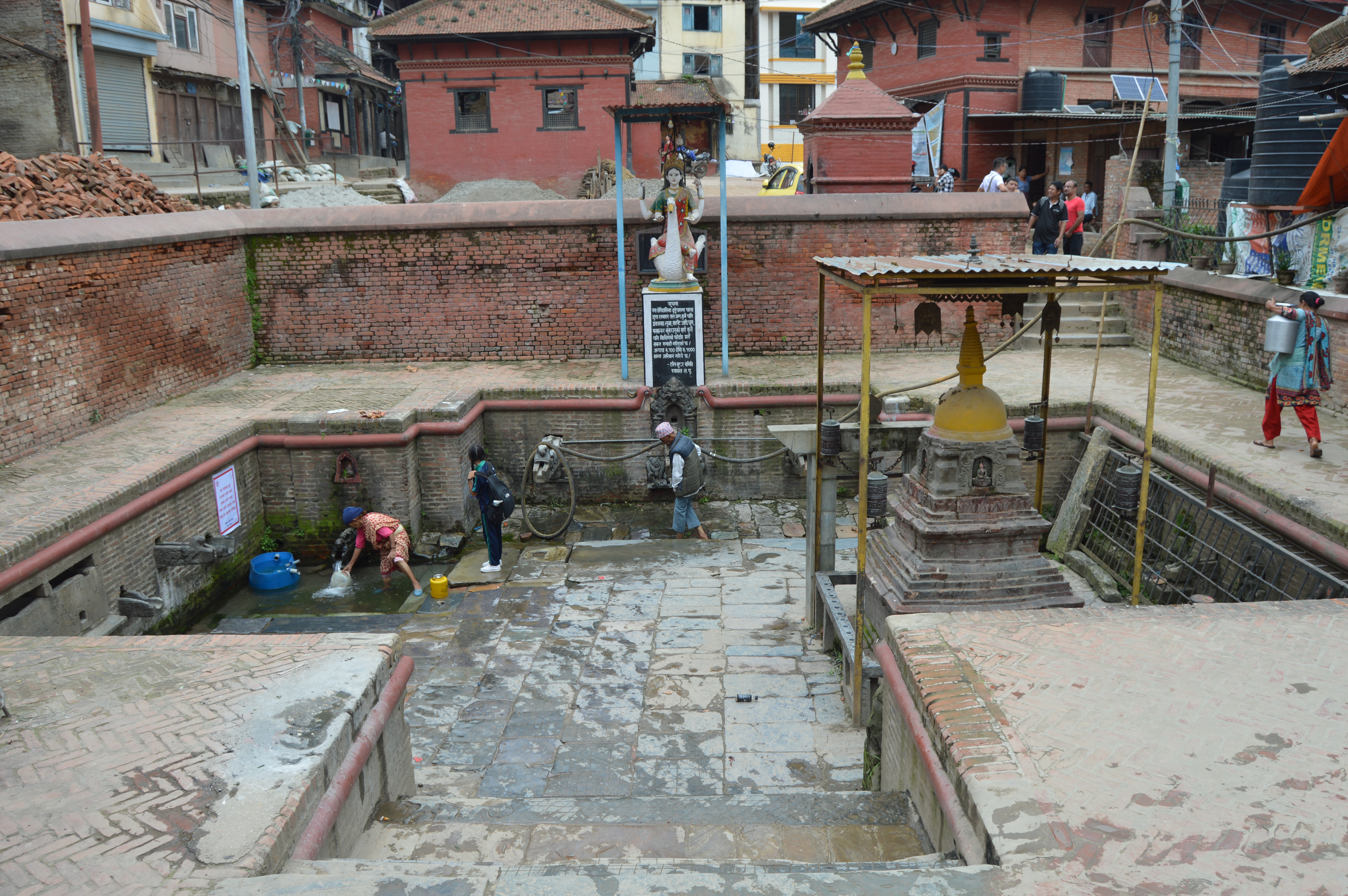
Saraswati Hiti

== See also ==
- Rajkarnikar (Halwai)
