= Godamchaur =

Godamchaur गोदामचौर
- Village of Godawari Municipality
- Location in Nepal: Middle of the Lalitpur District
- Coordinates: 27.62°N 85.37°E
- Country: Nepal
- Province: Province No. 3
- District: Lalitpur District Dhurhba Bahadur is the three times elected Chairman of the village from Nepali congress

Government
  - Village Development Chairman: Late Dhurba Bahadur Thapa

Population (1991)
  - Total: 3,868
- Time zone: UTC+5:45 (Nepal Time)

Godamchaur is a village and former Village Development Committee that is now part of Godawari Municipality in Province No. 3 of central Nepal. At the time of the 1991 Nepal census it had a population of 3,868 in 645 individual households. It has 9 small wards in this village development committee. Saathali (ward 6) is mostly inhabited by Newars.
