= Thecho =

Thecho ठेचो
- Village development committee
- Location in Nepal
- Coordinates: 27.62°N 85.32°E
- Country: Nepal
- Zone: Bagmati Zone
- District: Lalitpur District

Population (1991)
  - Total: 7,140
- Time zone: UTC+5:45 (Nepal Time)

Thecho is located about 6 km (3.7 mi) south of the main Lalitpur town in Lalitpur district, Godawari Municipality. According to 2011 Nepal census, Thecho has a population of 10,086 living in 2,352 individual households. The offshoot road near the Satdobato segment of the Ring Road leads to Thecho. This roads ultimately leads to Lele and is referred to as Satdobato-Tika Bhairab Road. This road is also called a "Laxmi Prasad Highway" which leads to Hetauda. Thecho has its own unique culture and festivals which include the balkumari jatra, bramayani jatra, nawadurga jatra and sindur jatra locally known as Sinha jatra

== Geography ==
The total area of the VDC is 3.2 km^{2} (1.2 sq mi). The main part of this village is situated at a height. On the east of Thecho are Jharuwarashi, Dhapakhel separated by Karmanasa stream. Nakhu River in the west separates it from Bungamati. Sunakothi VDC lies on the north of Thecho while on the south are Chapagaun and Chhampi VDCs. Nakhu river flows down south west of the village and some arable land stretches along this river.

== Etymology ==
Thecho was founded in the 16th century. The initial name of Thecho is believed to be Dharmatharipur. The settlement called “Dyecha” existed initially on the low lands near the river. When a landslide struck the village, villagers shifted to the upper lands, and were hence referred as chhen choy ( Newari - chhen: house, choy: up). The terms chhen choy was modified into Thecho.

== Major attractions ==
Thecho was once popular for milk curd (Khuwa) but nowadays the major production of Thecho is mustard oil.

There are three major religious and social attractions in Thecho. Bramhayeni Temple is the main temple in Thecho. Its most prominent features are the utensils nailed to its walls; they are nailed by families in the name of the souls of their departed members. Balkumari Temple is a shrine located in Lachi Tole and is said to have been constructed in 913 NS (1793 AD). Sorakhutte Pati is a rest house which has a roof supported by 16 pillars.

== Major educational institutions ==
1. Shree Saraswoti Higher Secondary School
2. Indreni Secondary English School
3. Little Star English School
4. St. Paul Higher Secondary English School
5. Somang Academy
6. Bal Aankur Secondary English School
7. Deepmala Secondary English School
8. Thecho Newa English School
9. Kathmandu International Study Centre

== Administrative division ==
Ward → Main tole → Other places

1 → Maligaun → Jhyalipati, Jogigaun, Salcha, Dhangacha, Dathujho

2 → Tanani→ Pukhusi, Lachhi, Laijho, Pacho, Pingal

3 → Kuthujho → Dawanani, Suganani, Khachatole

4 → Kusukotole → Sikhachhen, Tunani, Nanigal

5 → Jhochhen → Chhasatole, Guwanani, Lachhi, Chapako, Wanani, Gachhitole, Nhuchhentole

6 → Kutujho → Laijho, Dhokasing, Tanani, Dhaunani, Pukhusi, Twacha, Bakusi

7 → Nhuchhen Tole → Damgonani, Twacha, Pukhusi

8 → Durikhel → Paumagal, lamatar, Ratamata, Pokhari

9 → Tarankhel → Bauwapau, Makathy, Salitar, Lamachaur, Bethegal

== Culture ==
Most of the prominent Newari festivals are observed in Thecho. However, Yomari Puni is considered as main festival. It is celebrated for 4 days starting from the full moon of December. During this festival, Bramhayani, Balkumari, Bhairav and Navadurga are carried around the town in a chariot. The dyo: pukhu: behind the Bramhayani is filled by water from Lele and the chariots are washed. There is a legendary traditional dance of Nawadurga Bhawani of Thecho which is performed every year during Vijaya Dashami.
