= Jharuwarasi =

Jharuwarasi झरुवारासी
- Village development committee
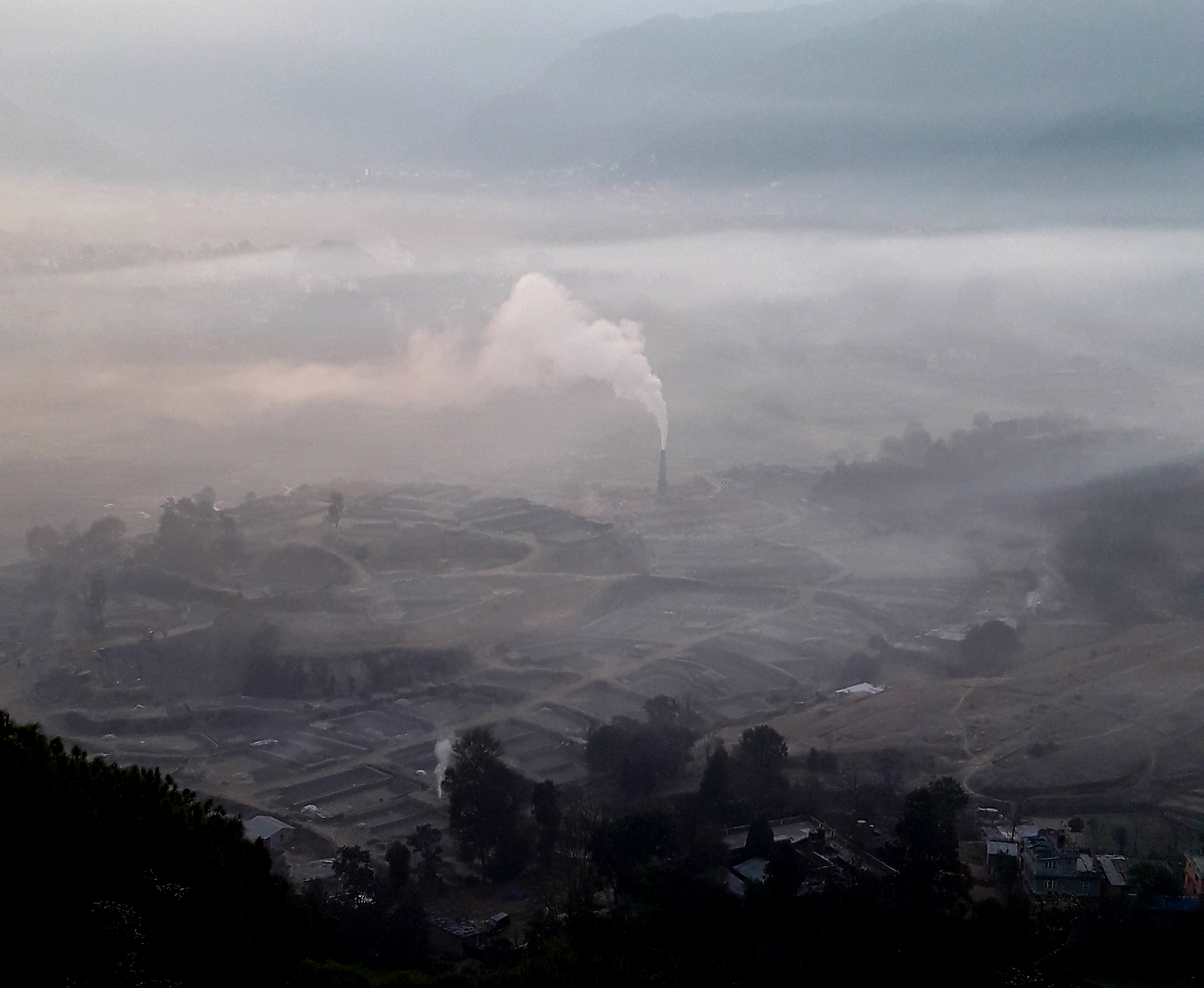
- Jharuwarasi, back view from Shree Santaneshwo

- Location in Nepal
- Coordinates: 27°36′N 85°18′E
- Country: Nepal
- Zone: Bagmati Zone
- District: Lalitpur District

Population (2001)
  - Total: 3,185
- Time zone: UTC+5:45 (Nepal Time)

Jharuwarashi is a village development committee in Lalitpur District in the Bagmati Zone of central Nepal. According to 2001 Nepal census, it had a population of 3,185 living in 586 individual households.

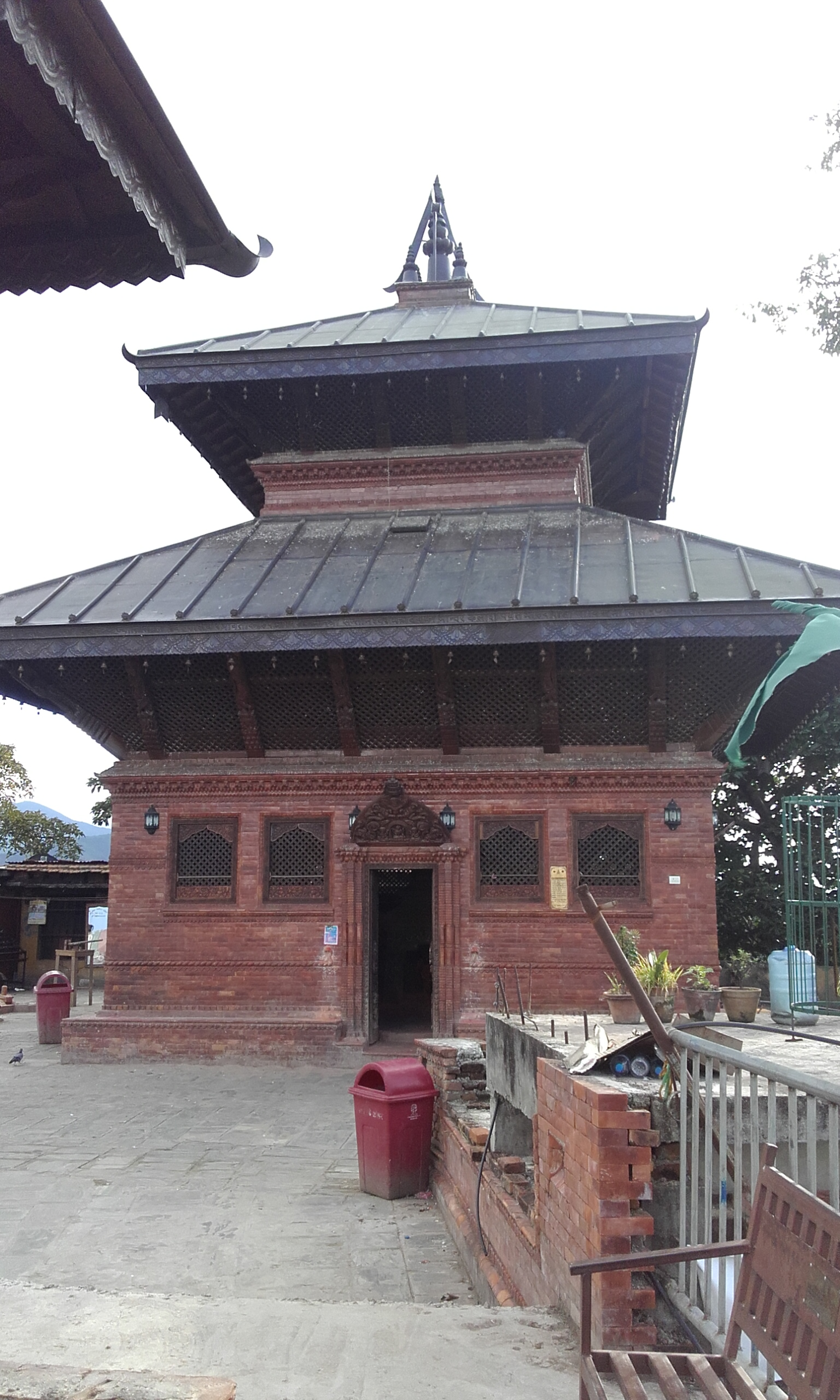
Santaneshwor Mahadev Temple

The village is located some 8 kilometers away from Patan, Nepal and 12 kilometers away from the capital city, Kathmandu. Santaneshwor Mahadev temple is one of the popular religious destinations for Hindu devotees. There is a large horde of devotees in the month of January and February to worship God Shiva.
