= Dukuchhap =

Dukuchhap डुकुछाप
- Village development committee
- Location in Nepal
- Coordinates: 27.59°N 85.29°E
- Country: Nepal
- Zone: Bagmati Zone
- District: Lalitpur District

Population (1991)
  - Total: 3,501
- Time zone: UTC+5:45 (Nepal Time)

Dukuchhap is a village development committee in Lalitpur District in the Bagmati Zone of central Nepal. At the time of the 1991 Nepal census it had a population of 3,501 .
