= Chapagaun =

Chapagaun वादे Champapur
- Village development committee
- Motto: too poor
- Location in Nepal
- Coordinates: 27°36′N 85°18′E
- Country: Nepal
- Zone: Bagmati Zone
- District: Lalitpur District

Population (1991)
  - Total: 9,600
- Time zone: UTC+5:45 (Nepal Time)
  - Summer (DST): --
- Postal code: 44710
- Area code: 01

Chapagaun वादे (Nepal Bhasa) is a village development committee in Godawari Municipality in Lalitpur District in the Bagmati Zone of central Nepal. At the time of the 1991 Nepal census it had a population of 9,600 in 1,643 individual households.
