= Bisankhunarayan =

Village of Godawari Municipality in Province No. 3, Nepal

Bishankhunarayan
- Village of Godawari Municipality
- Location in Nepal
- Coordinates: 27.61°N 85.39°E
- Country: Nepal
- Province: Province No. 3
- District: Lalitpur District

Population (1991)
  - Total: 3,867
- Time zone: UTC+5:45 (Nepal Time)

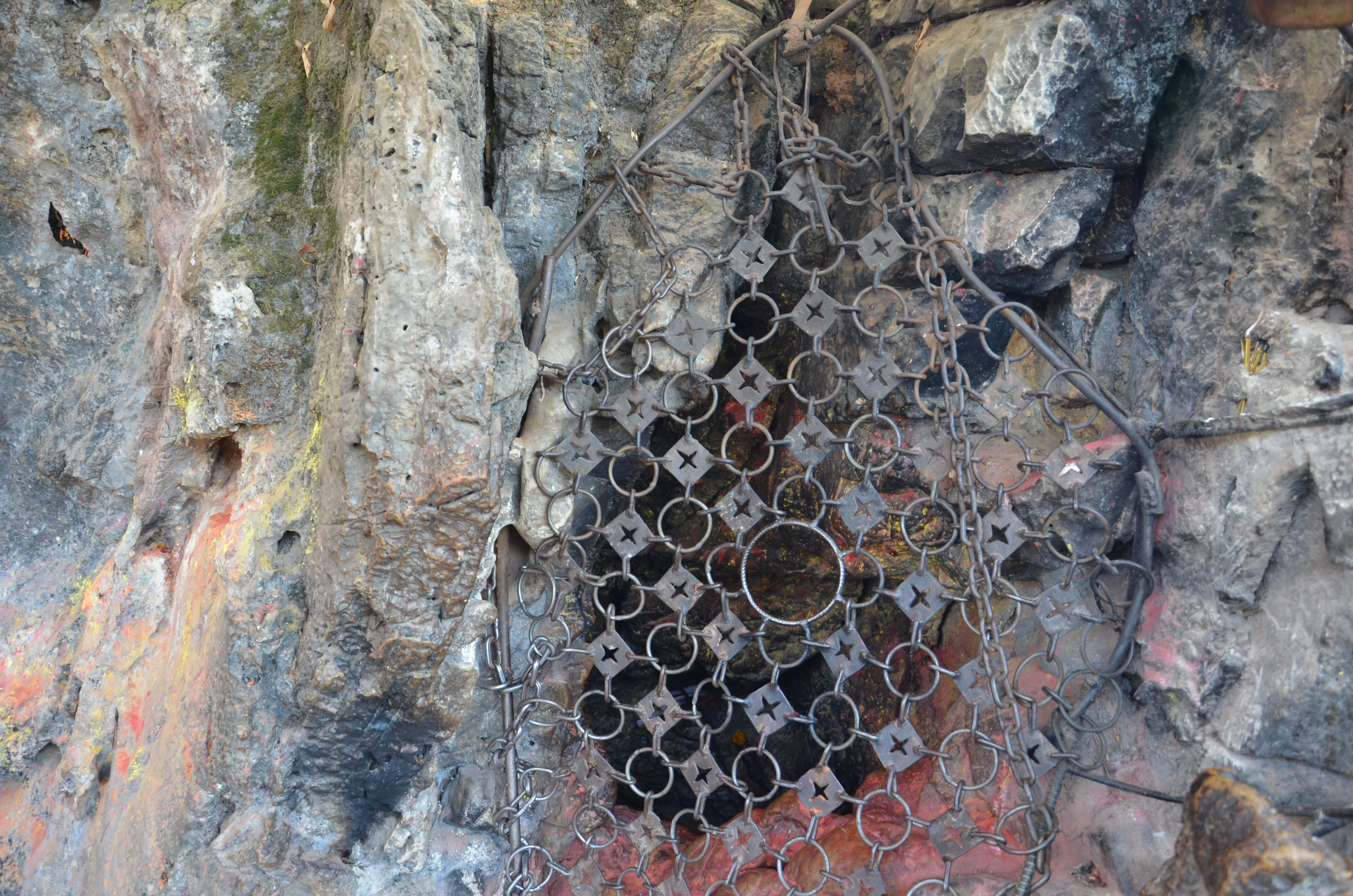

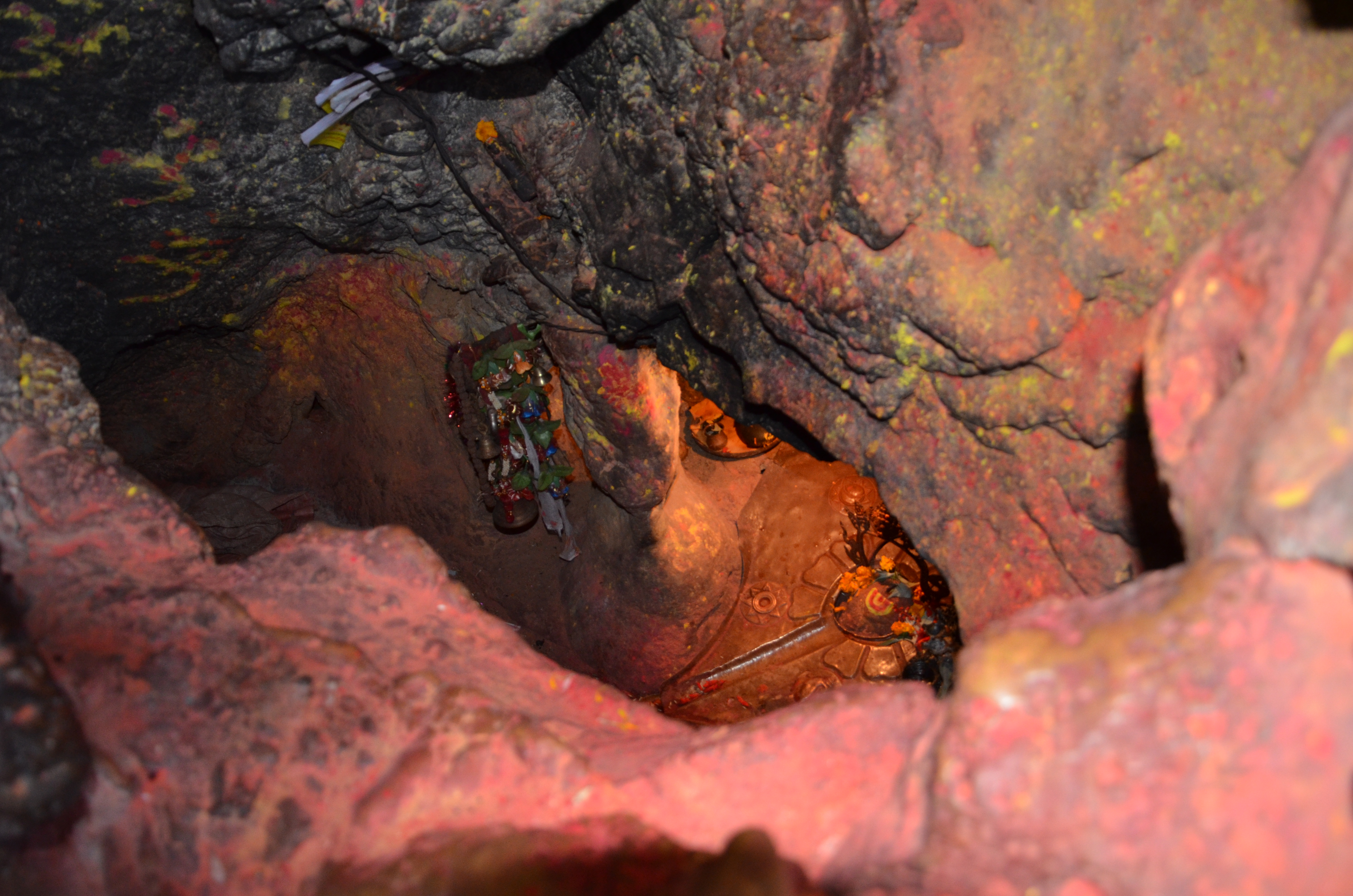
Natural Cave in Bisankhunarayan

Bisankhunarayan is a village and former Village Development Committee that is now part of Godawari Municipality in Province No. 3 of central Nepal. At the time of the 1991 Nepal census it had a population of 3,867 in 707 individual households.

Villages near Bishnankhunarayan include Godawari and Godamchour.
