= Sunakothi =

Sunaguthi सुनागुथी
- Lalitpur Metropolitan City
- Location in Nepal
- Coordinates: 27.64°N 85.32°E
- Country: Nepal
- Zone: Bagmati Zone
- District: Lalitpur District

Population (2011)
  - Total: 10,092
- Time zone: UTC+5:45 (Nepal Time)

Sunaguthi is a small town located about 4 km (2.5 mi) south of the main Lalitpur city in Lalitpur District. According to the 2011 Nepal census, Sunaguthi has a population of 10,092 living in 2,397 individual households. Most of the people living in Sunaguthi are Newar. The offshoot road near the Satdobato segment of the Ring Road leads to Sunaguthi. This road ultimately leads to Lele and is referred to as Laxmi Prasad Devkota Marga (Satdobato - Tika Bahirab).Thecho is situated on the southern part of Sunaguthi, Bungamati and Bhaisipati on west, Dhapakhel on east and Khumaltar and Nakhipot on North. The famous jatras of Sunaguthi include Yomari Punhi, Gathamuga, Bhimsen jatra, Chakha jatra, and Pekha jatra.

== Geography ==
The town is spread over an area of 3.08 km^{2} (1.19 sq mi). On the east lies Dhapakhel, on west lies Bungamati and Bhaisepati along with the Nakhu river. Also Thecho in the south and Nakhipot in the north.

== Etymology ==
The old name of Sunakothi was Bhringar Grama named after the temple of Bhringareshwor Mahadev. There are two myths regarding how the name Sunakothi came into being.

Sana refers to a funeral procession in Newari. The village is said to have been inhabited by people who helped in funeral works. They hence had a social group of families or Guthi called Sanaguthi. According to popular saying, the word Sunakothi word evolved from Sanaguthi.

According to another myth, when the local temple of Swornapur Mandir [Bhringareshwor Mahadev] was worshipped wearing a Kush Ring (a ring made out of Hay), it turned into a gold ring which translates to Sunko Authi in Nepali. A greedy Brahmin (higher caste in nepali) in order to achieve more gold had hit the shiva linga with an axe. The damages in the linga can still be seen. Thus the name of the place is said to have gradually changed into Sunakothi from Sunko Authi.

== History ==
The stone inscription around the Bhringareshwor temple indicates that it was built during Lichhavi period. The 5th century stone describes about Managriha and Kailashkut Bhawan and the location was then called Bhringar Grama. Proper settlement however is said to have been established by King Ratna Malla. He is said to have established a settlement of 300 houses with families and also started the Chaitra Purnima Jatra. The boundary of old settlement was marked by Marker stones on north and south road.

== Major attractions ==
Bhringareshwor Mahadev: Bhringeshwor Mahadev is the main temple of Sunakothi. The temple is believed to have been established by King Bishnu Singha in memory of his father King Kusum Singha in 1554 AD [674NS]. Initial form of the temple is believed to be 3 storied pagoda whose huge artistic struts are still present in the complex. It was rebuilt in present-day domed style after the 1934 Nepal–Bihar earthquake.

Balkumari Temple: It is a two storeyed temple dedicated to goddess Balkumari located in the middle of the Balkumari forest. A large empty ground, about 100 by 100 m^{2} (1,100 by 1,100 sq ft), lies nearby the temple which is also the major attraction for the football players. The carved wooden tundals of Shree Mahakali, Rakta Kaali, Ganesha, Nilo Kaali, Mahalaxmi, Barahi, Bahirav, etc. are visible. The temple in the residential area is of the daughter of Shree Balkumari called Pancha Kumari. The idol of the goddess is taken down from the temple and placed in the chariots to observe the local Jatras which falls twice a year.

Boudha Jana Bihar: One can see a huge Jana bihar (Buddhist Gumba) on the way to Balkumari forest. Each year on the occasion of Buddha Purnima, the bihar organizes a rally program in which thousands of people visit.

Bhimsen Statue: Probably one of the tallest Bhimsen idols of Nepal. Every year, Bhimsen puja is celebrated in the month of August.

== Administrative division ==
Before the local level election held in 2017, it was the part of Lalitpur Sub- Metropolitan City. After that it came to be known as Lalitpur Metropolitan City. The wards and locality [toles] they contain are:

Ward No. → Name of toles

26 → Kulaphal, Jainkhel, Pukhusi, Lanko, kalpata:, Chibahal, Pambha, Pancho, Nani chi bahal, Chokhel, Choyavinayak, Dholahiti

27 → Ara, Enabhacha, Chhansa tole, Chokiba, Dampa ta, Hitiphusa, Dhokashi, Khashijole, Daracha, Bhramhatole, Utujhol, Dhalanga, Tegacha, Chokiba, Dhathutole, Chapaphal, Dewal, Dekiba, Chautara and Okhat.

== Culture ==
Festivals and culture observed here are similar to those celebrated in Kathmandu. However, the highlights are the Gojamari Punhi celebrated during Yomari Punhi in Mangshir [Full moon of December] and Bal kumari Jatra also called Pekha Jatra celebrated on the full moon day of Chaitra.

The festival in Yomari Purnima is celebrated for 3 days. In the festival, Balkumari goddess is carried on a chariot throughout the inner settlement to the mother temple located in the isolated forest of the area.

Other such festival is the one in Chaitra. During this festival, Yonsi (believed to be a divine serpentine) or a high wooden pole is erected in chowk, in front of Balkumari temple and other along the main street. Also, during this festival four chariots (Shree Ganesha, Goddess Balkumari, Lord shiva with Parvati and lord Kumar) are taken around the core town. Similarly, other occasions like Shivaratri, Indra Jatra, Buddha jayanti, Krishna Janmastami etc. are celebrated with the massive involvement and enthusiasm of the people. Moreover, other jatras like Indra jatra, Krishna Janmastami Bhimsen jatra etc are celebrated with huge collaboration of the local people as well as residents from other places.

Besides this, occasionally pinga: puja is also done for at least 40 days or more along with the local people and baja khala, vajans, etc.
