= Lalitpur District, Nepal =

Coordinates: 27°40′N 85°19′E

Lalitpur District ललितपुर जिल्ला
- District
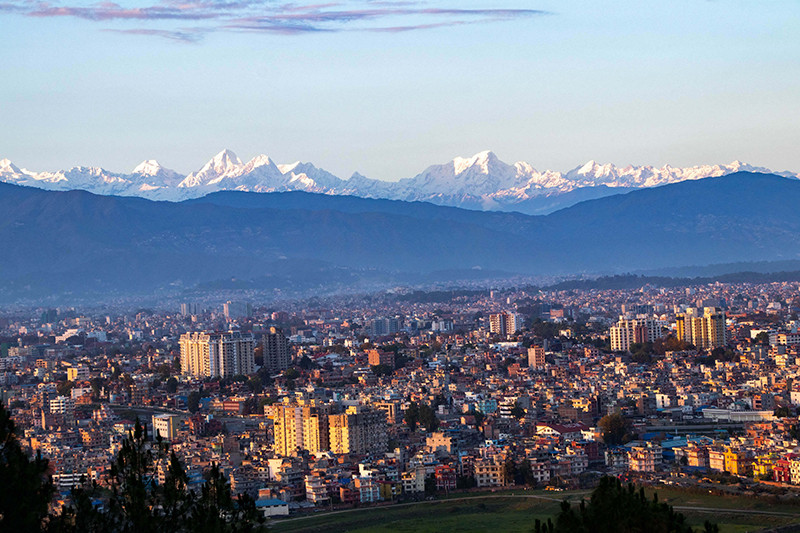
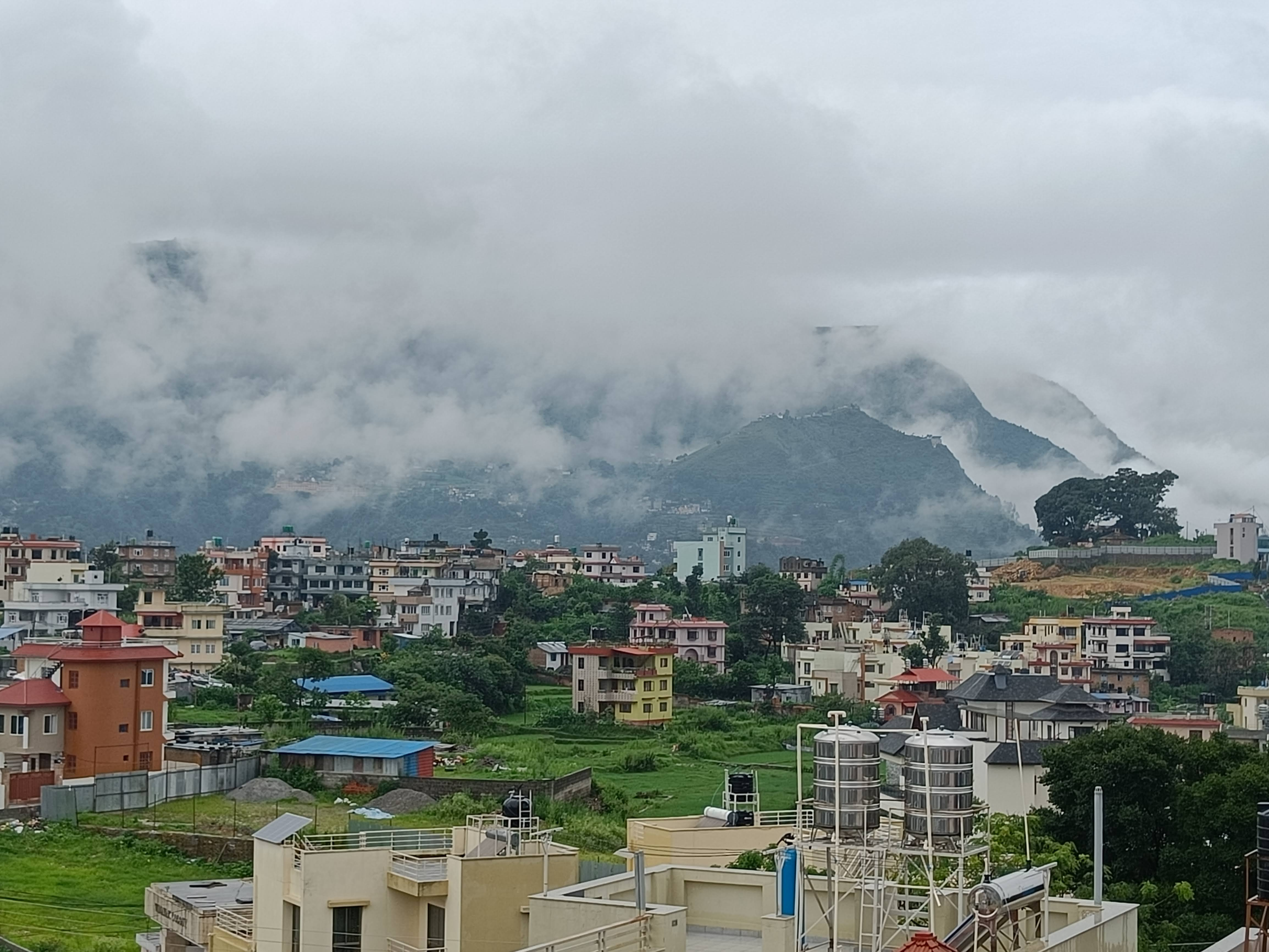
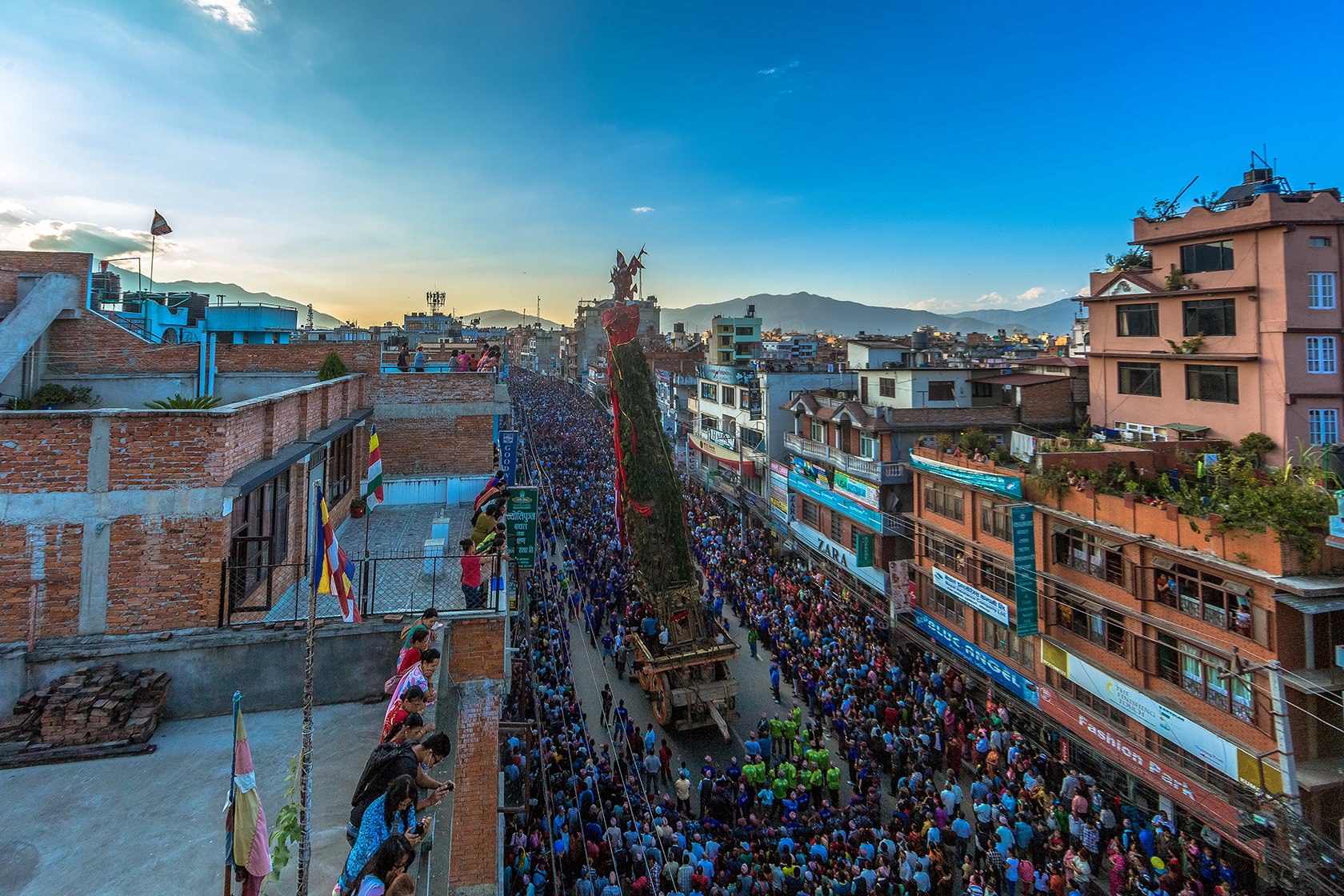
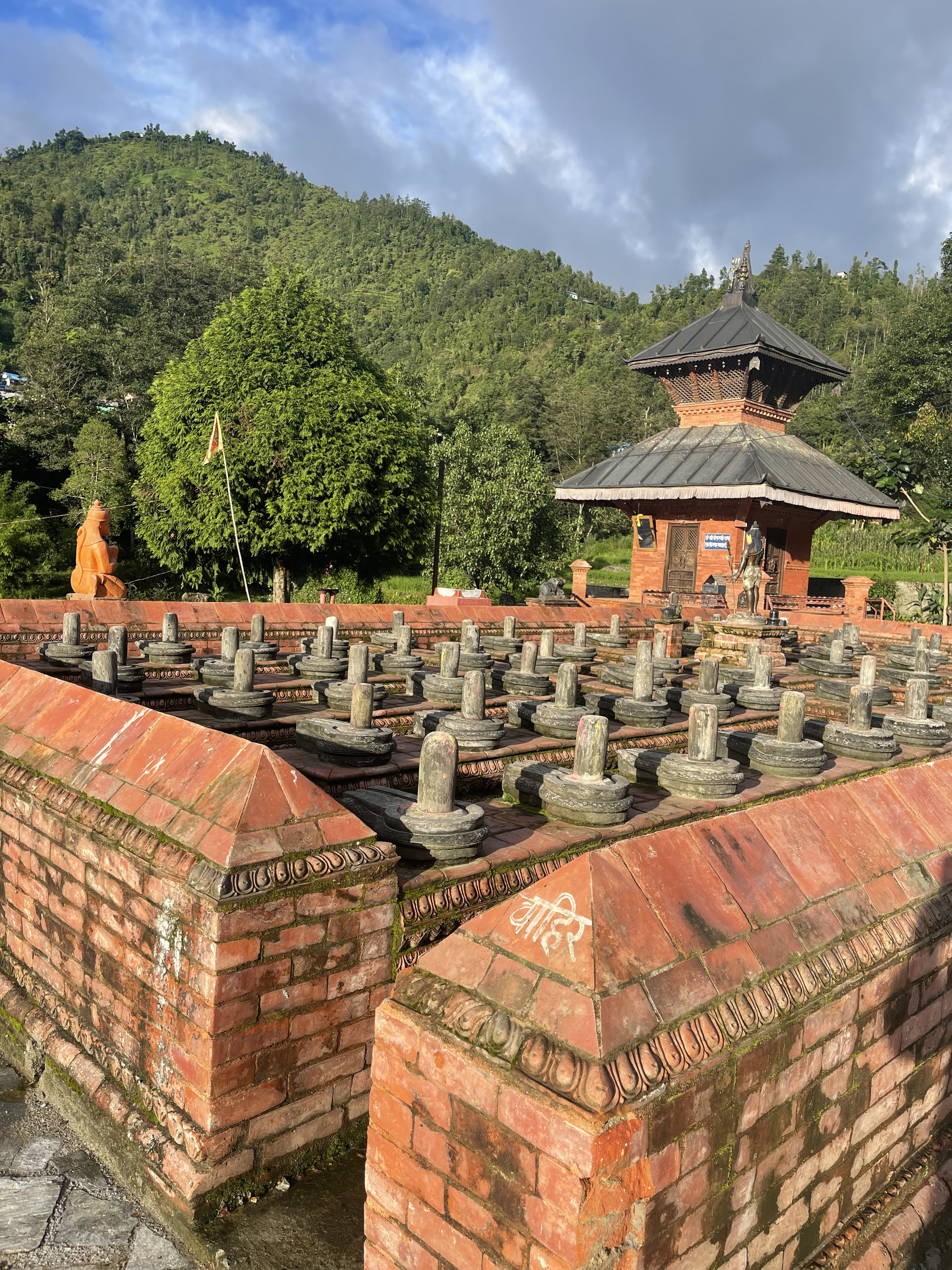
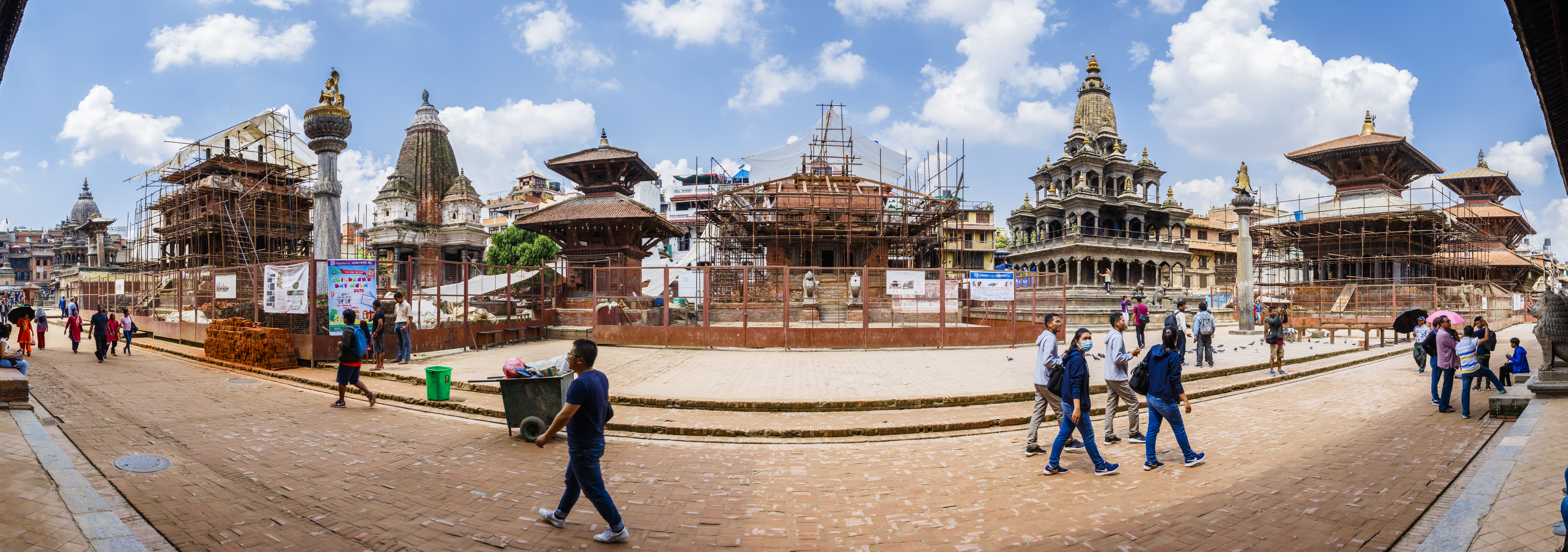
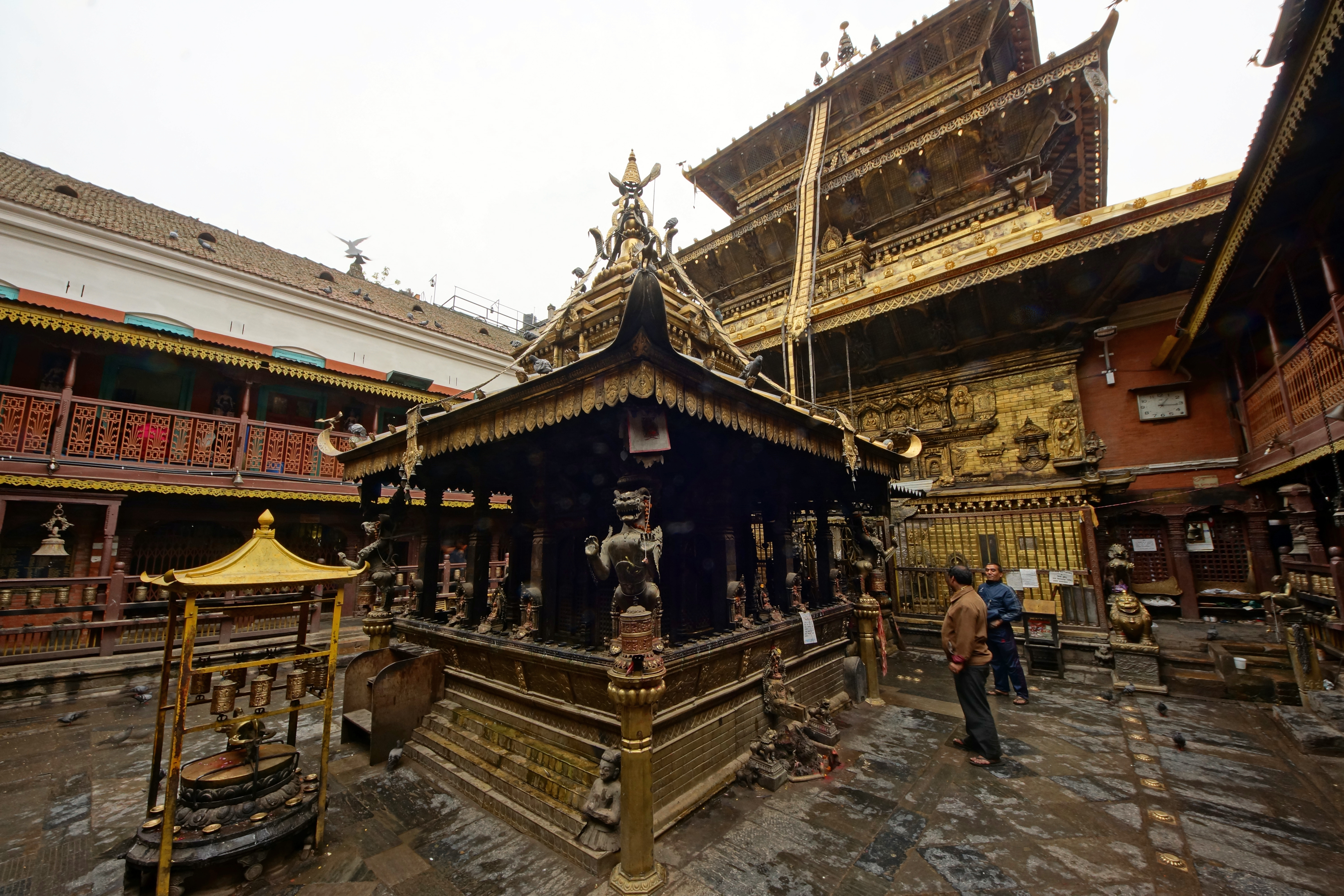
- Lalitpur Skyline Foggy hills of Lalitpur chariot of Machhendranath Baitarnidhaam Tarakeshwor Temple Patan Durbar Square Kumaripati Temple Hiranya Varna Mahavihar - The Golden Temple
- Interactive map of Lalitpur District
- Country: Nepal
- Admin HQ.: Lalitpur

Government
  - Type: Coordination committee
  - Body: DCC, Lalitpur

Area
  - Total: 396.92 km^{2} (153.25 sq mi)

Population (2011)
  - Total: 468,132
  - Density: 1,179.4/km^{2} (3,054.7/sq mi)
- 2001 pop.: 337,785; 1991 pop.: 257,086; 1991 pop.: 184,341
- Time zone: UTC+05:45 (NPT)
- Website: www.ddclalitpur.gov.np

Lalitpur District (Nepali: ललितपुर जिल्ला, in Bagmati Province, is one of the seventy-seven districts of Nepal. The district, with Lalitpur as its district headquarters, covers an area of 396.92 km^{2} (153.25 sq mi) and has a population (2001) of 337,785. It is one of three districts in the Kathmandu Valley, along with Kathmandu and Bhaktapur. Its population was 466,784 in the initial 2011 census tabulation. It is surrounded by Makwanpur, Bhaktapur, Kathmandu and Kavrepalanchowk districts.

== Geography and climate ==
Climate Zone	Elevation Range	% of Area
Upper Tropical	300 to 1,000 meters 1,000 to 3,300 ft.	9.9%
Subtropical	1,000 to 2,000 meters 3,300 to 6,600 ft.	79.3%
Temperate	2,000 to 3,000 meters 6,400 to 9,800 ft.	10.8%

== Demographics ==
Historical population
Census year	Pop.	±% p.a.
1981	184,341	—
1991	257,086	+3.38%
2001	337,785	+2.77%
2011	468,132	+3.32%
2021	551,667	+1.66%
Source: Citypopulation

At the time of the 2021 Nepal census, Lalitpur District had a population of 551,667. 5.51% of the population is under 5 years of age. It has a literacy rate of 88.08% and a sex ratio of 991 females per 1000 males. 514,847 (93.33%) lived in municipalities.

Castes/ethnic groups in Lalitpur District (2021)
1. Newar (29.6%)
2. Chhetri (18.6%)
3. Bahun (13.1%)
4. Tamang (13.1%)
5. Magar (5.08%)
6. Rai (3.36%)
7. Kami (1.77%)
8. Tharu (1.52%)
9. Limbu (1.24%)
10. Gurung (1.14%)
11. Madheshi non-Dalit (3.67%)
12. Other Hill Janjati (2.24%)
13. Other Khas non-Dalit (1.98%)
14. Other Khas Dalit (1.62%)
15. Others (2.09%)

Ethnicity wise: Khas are the largest group, making up 37% of the population. Newars, the indigenous people of the Kathmandu Valley, make up nearly 30% of the population. Hill Janjatis, mainly Tamang and Magar, make up 26% of the population.

Languages of Lalitpur district (2021)
1. Nepali (45.6%)
2. Nepal Bhasha (27.0%)
3. Tamang (12.2%)
4. Maithili (2.90%)
5. Magar (2.68%)
6. Rai (1.65%)
7. Tharu (1.17%)
8. Bhojpuri (1.11%)
9. Limbu (0.96%)
10. Others (4.80%)

At the time of the 2021 census, 45.61% of the population spoke Nepali, 26.96% Nepal Bhasha, 12.16% Tamang, 2.90% Maithili, 2.68% Magar, 1.65% Rai, 1.17% Tharu, 1.11% Bhojpuri and 0.96% Limbu as their first language. In 2011, 47.3% of the population spoke Nepali as their first language.

Religion in Lalitpur District (2021)
Religion	Percent
Hinduism	74.69%
Buddhism	17.17%
Christianity	4.82%
Kirat Mundhum	2.45%
Islam	0.73%
Other or not stated	0.14%

== Administrative division ==
There are six municipalities in Lalitpur District, including three Rural Municipalities and one Metropolitan city:

- Lalitpur Metropolitan City
- Mahalaxmi Municipality
- Godawari Municipality
- Konjyoson Rural Municipality
- Bagmati Rural Municipality
- Mahankal Rural Municipality

=== Former Village Development Committees ===
Prior to federal restructuring, the following Village development committees were also part of the district. By 2017, they were all merged into municipalities or rural municipalities or were included in Lalitpur Metropolitan City.

- Ashrang
- Badikhel, now Godawari Municipality
- Bhardev
- Bhattedanda
- Bisankhunarayan, now Godawari Municipality
- Bungamati (Bunga), now Lalitpur Metropolitan City-22
- Bhainsepti, now Lalitpur Metropolitan Ciity-25
- Chandanpur
- Chapagaun, now Godawari Municipality
- Chaughare
- Chhampi, now Godawari Municipality
- Dalchoki
- Devichaur
- Dhapakhel, now Lalitpur Municipality
- Dukuchhap, now Karyabinayak Municipality
- Ghusel
- Gimdi
- Godamchaur, now Godawari Municipality
- Godawari, now Godawari Municipality
- Gotikhel
- Harisiddhi, now Lalitpur Metropolitan City- 28 and 29
- Ikudol
- Imadol, now Mahalakshmi Municipality
- Jharuwarasi, now Godawari Municipality
- Kaleshwar
- Khokana, now Lalitpur Metropolitan City- 21
- Lamatar, now Mahalakshmi Municipality
- Lele, now Godawari Municipality
- Lubhu, now Mahalakshmi Municipality
- Malta
- Manikhel
- Nallu
- Pyutar
- Sainbu, now Lalitpur Metropolitan City- 18
- Sankhu
- Siddhipur, now Mahalakshmi Municipality
- Sunakothi, now Lalitpur Municipality
- Thaiba, now Godawari Municipality
- Thecho, now Godawari Municipality
- Thuladurlung
- Tikathali, now Mahalakshmi Municipality

== Other places ==
- Jharuwarasi
- Chyasal
- Jawalakhel
- Pyan Gaun
- Jhamsikhel
- Kumaripati
- Kupondole
- Kusunti
- माल्टा
- Siddhipur

== Education ==
Lalitpur District has adequate education facilities in comparison to other districts, including:

- Adarsha Vidya Mandir (AVM)
- Adarsha Saula Yubak Higher Secondary School
- AIMS Academy
- Graded English Medium School (GEMS)
- Annal Jyoti Boarding School (AJS)
- United Universal School
- Ideal Model School
- Institute of Engineering (Pulchok)
- I.J. Pioneer High School
- Little Angels' School
- Little Learners Fun School (Saibu Bhaisepati)
- Rato Bangala school
- United school (Imadol)
- St. Mary's School
- St. Xavier's School
- Nepal Don Bosco School, Siddhipur
- Shuvatara School
- Vajra Academy (Jharuwarashi)
- Milestone School
- Anant English School, Siddhipur
- The Sudesha School (Nakhkhu)
- Pawan Prakriti English Secondary school (Tikathali)
- Pathshala Nepal Foundation (Bagdol)
- Prasadi Academy, Manbhawan
- Nalanda Secondary Boarding School (Satdobato)
- Kshitiz Secondary Boarding School (Harisiddhi)
- Nawa Bihani School, Imadole
- Oracle English Medium School
- Royal Yala World School
- Yala Newa International School
- Unique Academy/College, Kumaripati
- United Academy (Kumaripati)
- Kitini secondary higher school (thaukhel)
- Radiant Readers Academy (Sanepa)
- Bluebird Secondary School (BSS)

== Sports ==
Lalitpur is also home to several notable sporting organisations and grounds such as:

- ANFA Complex, Satdobato
- Tennis Complex, Satdobato
- Army Physical Training Centre, Lagankhel
- Chyasal Technical Centre, Chyasal
- Thecho Badminton Club
- Pragaypokhari Badminton Circle, Prayagpokhari

== Business/Social Organizations ==
There are many business or social organizations in Siddhipur.

SN	Organization Name	Type	Established	Nickname	Motto	Logo	Reference
1	Unification of The Youth	Social Organization	formed on 2072 B.S and legally registered on 2073 B.S	UNITY	Youths for social changes.	Logo of UNITY	http://unity.org.np
