= Chhampi =

Chhampi छम्पी
- Village development committee
- Location in Nepal
- Coordinates: 27.60°N 85.31°E
- Country: Nepal
- Zone: Bagmati Zone
- District: Lalitpur District

Population (1991)
  - Total: 5,162
- Time zone: UTC+5:45 (Nepal Time)

Chhampi is a village development committee in Lalitpur District in the Bagmati Zone of central Nepal. At the time of the 1991 Nepal census, it had a population of 5,162 people living in 928 individual households.
