= ISO 639:t =

List of ISO 639-3 language codes starting with T

This is a list of ISO 639-3 language codes starting with T.

Index | a | b | c | d | e | f | g | h | i | j | k | l | m | n | o | p | q | r | s | t | u | v | w | x | y | z

Abbreviations are used in the table as follows:

- Scope: I = individual language, M = macrolanguage, S = special code
- Type: C = constructed, E = extinct (in recent times), H = historical (distinct from its modern form), L = living, S = special code

Deprecated codes are enclosed in (parentheses).

The column Family contains the generic English name of the language's family or macrolanguage.

ISO 639 codes			Scope/Type	Family	Language names	
639-3	639-1	639-2/B	Scope/Type	Family	Native	ISO name
taa			I/L			Lower Tanana
tab			I/L		табасаран	Tabassaran
tac			I/L			Lowland Tarahumara
tad			I/L			Tause
tae			I/L			Tariana
taf			I/L			Tapirapé
tag			I/L			Tagoi
tah	ty	tah	I/L	Austronesian	te reo Tahiti	Tahitian
taj			I/L			Eastern Tamang
tak			I/L			Tala
tal			I/L			Tal
tam	ta	tam	I/L	Dravidian	தமிழ்	Tamil
tan			I/L			Tangale
tao			I/L			Yami
tap			I/L			Taabwa
taq			I/L		تَمَاشَقْ	Tamasheq
tar			I/L		Ralámuli	Central Tarahumara
tas			I/E			Tay Boi
tat	tt	tat	I/L	Turkic	Tatarça	Tatar
tau			I/L			Upper Tanana
tav			I/L			Tatuyo
taw			I/L			Tai
tax			I/L			Tamki
tay			I/L			Atayal
taz			I/L			Tocho
tba			I/L	isolate	Tubarão	Aikanã
(tbb)			I/E	spurious language		Tapeba
tbc			I/L			Takia
tbd			I/L			Kaki Ae
tbe			I/L			Tanimbili
tbf			I/L			Mandara
tbg			I/L			North Tairora
tbh			I/E			Dharawal; Thurawal
tbi			I/L			Gaam
tbj			I/L			Tiang
tbk			I/L			Calamian Tagbanwa
tbl			I/L			Tboli
tbm			I/L			Tagbu
tbn			I/L			Barro Negro Tunebo
tbo			I/L			Tawala
tbp			I/L			Diebroud; Taworta
tbr			I/L			Tumtum
tbs			I/L			Tanguat
tbt			I/L			Tembo (Kitembo)
tbu			I/E			Tubar
tbv			I/L			Tobo
tbw			I/L		tabanawa	Tagbanwa
tbx			I/L			Kapin
tby			I/L			Tabaru
tbz			I/L			Ditammari
tca			I/L			Ticuna
tcb			I/L			Tanacross
tcc			I/L			Datooga
tcd			I/L			Tafi
tce			I/L			Southern Tutchone
tcf			I/L			Malinaltepec Me'phaa; Malinaltepec Tlapanec
tcg			I/L			Tamagario
tch			I/L			Turks And Caicos Creole English
tci			I/L			Wára
tck			I/L			Tchitchege
tcl			I/E	Sino-Tibetan		Taman (Myanmar)
tcm			I/L			Tanahmerah
tcn			I/L			Tichurong
tco			I/L	Sino-Tibetan	တောင်ရိုးစကား	Taungyo
tcp			I/L			Tawr Chin
tcq			I/L			Kaiy
tcs			I/L			Torres Strait Creole; Yumplatok
tct			I/L			T'en
tcu			I/L			Southeastern Tarahumara
tcw			I/L	Totozoquean?		Tecpatlán Totonac
tcx			I/L		தோதா	Toda
tcy			I/L		ತುಳು	Tulu
tcz			I/L			Thado Chin
tda			I/L			Tagdal
tdb			I/L			Panchpargania
tdc			I/L			Emberá-Tadó
tdd			I/L		ᥖᥭᥰᥖᥬᥳᥑᥨᥒᥰ	Tai Nüa
tde			I/L			Tiranige Diga Dogon
tdf			I/L			Talieng
tdg			I/L	Sino-Tibetan	पक्ष्चिमी तामाङ्ग	Western Tamang
tdh			I/L			Thulung
tdi			I/L			Tomadino
tdj			I/L			Tajio
tdk			I/L			Tambas
tdl			I/L			Sur
tdm			I/L			Taruma
tdn			I/L			Tondano
tdo			I/L			Teme
tdq			I/L			Tita
tdr			I/L			Todrah
tds			I/L			Doutai
tdt			I/L			Tetun Dili
(tdu)			I/L			Tempasuk Dusun
tdv			I/L			Toro
tdx			I/L			Tandroy-Mahafaly Malagasy
tdy			I/L			Tadyawan
tea			I/L			Temiar
teb			I/E			Tetete
tec			I/L			Terik
ted			I/L			Tepo Krumen
tee			I/L			Huehuetla Tepehua
tef			I/L			Teressa
teg			I/L			Teke-Tege
teh			I/L			Tehuelche
tei			I/L			Torricelli
tek			I/L			Ibali Teke
tel	te	tel	I/L	Dravidian	తెలుగు	Telugu
tem		tem	I/L			Timne
ten			I/E			Tama (Colombia)
teo			I/L			Teso
tep			I/E			Tepecano
teq			I/L			Temein
ter		ter	I/L			Tereno
tes			I/L			Tengger
tet		tet	I/L		Tetun	Tetum
teu			I/L			Soo
tev			I/L			Teor
tew			I/L			Tewa (USA)
tex			I/L			Tennet
tey			I/L			Tulishi
tez			I/L	Afro-Asiatic		Tetserret
tfi			I/L			Tofin Gbe
tfn			I/L			Tanaina
tfo			I/L			Tefaro
tfr			I/L			Teribe
tft			I/L			Ternate
tga			I/L			Sagalla
tgb			I/L			Tobilung
tgc			I/L			Tigak
tgd			I/L			Ciwogai
tge			I/L			Eastern Gorkha Tamang
tgf			I/L			Chalikha
(tgg)			I/L			Tangga
tgh			I/L			Tobagonian Creole English
tgi			I/L			Lawunuia
tgj			I/L			Tagin
tgk	tg	tgk	I/L	Indo-European	тоҷикӣ	Tajik
tgl	tl	tgl	I/L	Austronesian	Tagálog	Tagalog
tgn			I/L			Tandaganon
tgo			I/L			Sudest
tgp			I/L			Tangoa
tgq			I/L			Tring
tgr			I/L			Tareng
tgs			I/L			Nume
tgt			I/L			Central Tagbanwa
tgu			I/L			Tanggu
tgv			I/E			Tingui-Boto
tgw			I/L			Tagwana Senoufo
tgx			I/L		Tāgizi	Tagish
tgy			I/E			Togoyo
tgz			I/E			Tagalaka
tha	th	tha	I/L	Tai–Kadai	ภาษาไทย	Thai
(thc)			I/L			Tai Hang Tong
thd			I/L			Kuuk Thaayorre; Thayore
the			I/L			Chitwania Tharu
thf			I/L	Sino-Tibetan	Thāmī	Thangmi
thh			I/L			Northern Tarahumara
thi			I/L			Tai Long
thk			I/L			Kitharaka; Tharaka
thl			I/L			Dangaura Tharu
thm			I/L			Aheu
thn			I/L	Dravidian		Thachanadan
thp			I/L	Salishan	Nłeʔkepmxcín	Thompson; Nłeʔkepmxcín; Thompson River Salish
thq			I/L			Kochila Tharu
thr			I/L			Rana Tharu
ths			I/L			Thakali
tht			I/L	Dené–Yeniseian?	Tałtan ẕāke	Tāłtān
thu			I/L			Thuri
thv			I/L			Tahaggart Tamahaq
(thw)			I/L			Thudam
(thx)			I/L	spurious language		The
thy			I/L			Tha
thz			I/L			Tayart Tamajeq
tia			I/L			Tidikelt Tamazight
tic			I/L			Tira
(tid)			I/L			Tidong
(tie)			I/L			Tingal
tif			I/L			Tifal
tig		tig	I/L		Tigré	Tigre
tih			I/L			Timugon Murut
tii			I/L			Tiene
tij			I/L			Tilung
tik			I/L			Tikar
til			I/E			Tillamook
tim			I/L			Timbe
tin			I/L			Tindi
tio			I/L			Teop
tip			I/L			Trimuris
tiq			I/L			Tiéfo
tir	ti	tir	I/L	Afro-Asiatic	ትግርኛ	Tigrinya
tis			I/L			Masadiit Itneg
tit			I/L			Tinigua
tiu			I/L	Austronesian		Adasen
tiv		tiv	I/L			Tiv
tiw			I/L			Tiwi
tix			I/L			Southern Tiwa
tiy			I/L			Tiruray
tiz			I/L			Tai Hongjin
tja			I/L			Tajuasohn
tjg			I/L			Tunjung
tji			I/L	Sino-Tibetan	Bifzixsar	Northern Tujia
tjj			I/L			Tjungundji
tjl			I/L			Tai Laing
tjm			I/E			Timucua
tjn			I/E			Tonjon
tjo			I/L			Temacine Tamazight
tjp			I/L			Tjupany
tjs			I/L	Sino-Tibetan	Mongrzzirhof	Southern Tujia
tju			I/E			Tjurruru
tjw			I/L			Djabwurrung
tka			I/E			Truká
tkb			I/L			Buksa
tkd			I/L			Tukudede
tke			I/L			Takwane
tkf			I/E			Tukumanféd
tkg			I/L			Tesaka Malagasy
(tkk)			I/L			Takpa
tkl		tkl	I/L			Tokelau
tkm			I/E			Takelma
tkn			I/L			Toku-No-Shima
tkp			I/L			Tikopia
tkq			I/L			Tee
tkr			I/L			Tsakhur
tks			I/L			Takestani
tkt			I/L			Kathoriya Tharu
tku			I/L	Totozoquean?		Upper Necaxa Totonac
tkv			I/L	Austronesian		Mur Pano
tkw			I/L			Teanu
tkx			I/L			Tangko
tkz			I/L			Takua
tla			I/L			Southwestern Tepehuan
tlb			I/L			Tobelo
tlc			I/L			Yecuatla Totonac
tld			I/L			Talaud
(tle)			I/L			Southern Marakwet
tlf			I/L			Telefol
tlg			I/L			Tofanma
tlh		tlh	I/C		tlhIngan Hol	Klingon; tlhIngan Hol
tli		tli	I/L		Lingít	Tlingit
tlj			I/L			Talinga-Bwisi
tlk			I/L			Taloki
tll			I/L			Tetela
tlm			I/L			Tolomako
tln			I/L			Talondo'
tlo			I/L			Talodi
tlp			I/L			Filomena Mata-Coahuitlán Totonac
tlq			I/L			Tai Loi
tlr			I/L			Talise
tls			I/L			Tambotalo
tlt			I/L			Sou Nama; Teluti
tlu			I/L			Tulehu
tlv			I/L			Taliabu
(tlw)			I/L			South Wemale
tlx			I/L			Khehek
tly			I/L		толышә	Talysh
(tlz)			I/L			Toala'
tma			I/L			Tama (Chad)
tmb			I/L			Avava; Katbol
tmc			I/L			Tumak
tmd			I/L			Haruai
tme			I/E			Tremembé
tmf			I/L			Toba-Maskoy
tmg			I/E			Ternateño
tmh		tmh	M/L			Tamashek
tmi			I/L			Tutuba
tmj			I/L			Samarokena
(tmk)			I/L			Northwestern Tamang
tml			I/L			Tamnim Citak
tmm			I/L			Tai Thanh
tmn			I/L			Taman (Indonesia)
tmo			I/L			Temoq
(tmp)			I/L			Tai Mène
tmq			I/L			Tumleo
tmr			I/E			Jewish Babylonian Aramaic (ca. 200-1200 CE)
tms			I/L			Tima
tmt			I/L			Tasmate
tmu			I/L			Iau
tmv			I/L			Tembo (Motembo)
tmw			I/L			Temuan
(tmx)			I/L			Tomyang
tmy			I/L			Tami
tmz			I/E			Tamanaku
tna			I/L			Tacana
tnb			I/L			Western Tunebo
tnc			I/L			Tanimuca-Retuarã
tnd			I/L			Angosturas Tunebo
(tne)			I/L			Tinoc Kallahan
(tnf)			I/L			Tangshewi
tng			I/L			Tobanga
tnh			I/L			Maiani
tni			I/L			Tandia
(tnj)			I/L			Tanjong
tnk			I/L			Kwamera
tnl			I/L			Lenakel
tnm			I/L			Tabla
tnn			I/L			North Tanna
tno			I/L			Toromono
tnp			I/L			Whitesands
tnq			I/E			Taino
tnr			I/L	Niger–Congo?	Ménik	Ménik
tns			I/L			Tenis
tnt			I/L			Tontemboan
tnu			I/L			Tay Khang
tnv			I/L			Tangchangya
tnw			I/L			Tonsawang
tnx			I/L			Tanema
tny			I/L			Tongwe
tnz			I/L			Ten'edn
tob			I/L			Toba
toc			I/L			Coyutla Totonac
tod			I/L			Toma
(toe)			I/E	spurious language		Tomedes
tof			I/L			Gizrra
tog		tog	I/L		chiTonga	Tonga (Nyasa)
toh			I/L			Gitonga
toi			I/L			Tonga (Zambia)
toj			I/L			Tojolabal
tok			I/C		toki pona	Toki Pona
tol			I/E			Tolowa
tom			I/L			Tombulu
ton	to	ton	I/L	Austronesian	faka-Tonga	Tonga (Tonga Islands)
too			I/L			Xicotepec De Juárez Totonac
top			I/L			Papantla Totonac
toq			I/L			Toposa
tor			I/L			Togbo-Vara Banda
tos			I/L			Highland Totonac
(tot)			I/L			Patla-Chicontla Totonac
tou			I/L			Tho
tov			I/L			Upper Taromi
tow			I/L			Jemez
tox			I/L			Tobian
toy			I/L			Topoiyo
toz			I/L			To
tpa			I/L			Taupota
tpc			I/L			Azoyú Me'phaa; Azoyú Tlapanec
tpe			I/L	Sino-Tibetan	Tippera	Tippera
tpf			I/L	Austronesian		Tarpia
tpg			I/L			Kula
tpi		tpi	I/L		Tok Pisin	Tok Pisin
tpj			I/L			Tapieté
tpk			I/E	Tupian		Tupinikin
tpl			I/L			Tlacoapa Me'phaa; Tlacoapa Tlapanec
tpm			I/L			Tampulma
tpn			I/E	Tupian	abáñe'enga	Tupinambá
tpo			I/L			Tai Pao
tpp			I/L			Pisaflores Tepehua
tpq			I/L			Tukpa
tpr			I/L			Tuparí
tpt			I/L			Tlachichilco Tepehua
tpu			I/L			Tampuan
tpv			I/L			Tanapag
(tpw)			I/E	spurious language		Tupí
tpx			I/L			Acatepec Me'phaa; Acatepec Tlapanec
tpy			I/L			Trumai
tpz			I/L			Tinputz
tqb			I/L			Tembé
tql			I/L			Lehali
tqm			I/L			Turumsa
tqn			I/L			Tenino
tqo			I/L			Toaripi
tqp			I/L			Tomoip
tqq			I/L			Tunni
tqr			I/E			Torona
tqt			I/L	Totozoquean?	Ozomatlán Totonac	Western Totonac
tqu			I/L			Touo
tqw			I/E			Tonkawa
tra			I/L			Tirahi
trb			I/L			Terebu
trc			I/L			Copala Triqui
trd			I/L			Turi
tre			I/L			East Tarangan
trf			I/L			Trinidadian Creole English
trg			I/L			Lishán Didán
trh			I/L			Turaka
tri			I/L			Trió
trj			I/L			Toram
trl			I/L			Traveller Scottish
trm			I/L			Tregami
trn			I/L			Trinitario
tro			I/L			Tarao Naga
trp			I/L	Sino-Tibetan	Kokborok	Kok Borok
trq			I/L			San Martín Itunyoso Triqui
trr			I/L			Taushiro
trs			I/L			Chicahuaxtla Triqui
trt			I/L			Tunggare
tru			I/L			Surayt; Turoyo
trv			I/L	Austronesian	Kari Seediq	Sediq; Seediq; Taroko
trw			I/L			Torwali
trx			I/L			Tringgus-Sembaan Bidayuh
try			I/E			Turung
trz			I/E			Torá
tsa			I/L			Tsaangi
tsb			I/L			Tsamai
tsc			I/L			Tswa
tsd			I/L			Tsakonian
tse			I/L			Tunisian Sign Language
(tsf)			I/L			Southwestern Tamang
tsg			I/L			Tausug
tsh			I/L			Tsuvan
tsi		tsi	I/L		Sm’algyax̣	Tsimshian
tsj			I/L	Sino-Tibetan		Tshangla
tsk			I/L			Tseku
tsl			I/L			Ts'ün-Lao
tsm			I/L			Türk İşaret Dili; Turkish Sign Language
tsn	tn	tsn	I/L	Niger–Congo	Setswana	Tswana
tso	ts	tso	I/L	Niger–Congo	Xitsonga	Tsonga
tsp			I/L			Northern Toussian
tsq			I/L			Thai Sign Language
tsr			I/L			Akei
tss			I/L			Taiwan Sign Language
tst			I/L			Tondi Songway Kiini
tsu			I/L			Tsou
tsv			I/L			Tsogo
tsw			I/L			Tsishingini
tsx			I/L			Mubami
tsy			I/L			Tebul Sign Language
tsz			I/L			Purepecha
tta			I/E			Tutelo
ttb			I/L			Gaa
ttc			I/L			Tektiteko
ttd			I/L			Tauade
tte			I/L			Bwanabwana
ttf			I/L			Tuotomb
ttg			I/L			Tutong
tth			I/L	Austroasiatic		Upper Ta'oih
tti			I/L			Tobati
ttj			I/L	Niger-Congo	Orutooro	Tooro
ttk			I/L			Totoro
ttl			I/L			Totela
ttm			I/L			Northern Tutchone
ttn			I/L			Towei
tto			I/L	Austroasiatic		Lower Ta'oih
ttp			I/L			Tombelala
ttq			I/L		تَمَاجِقْ	Tawallammat Tamajaq
ttr			I/L			Tera
tts			I/L		ภาษาอีสาน	Northeastern Thai
ttt			I/L		Tati, тати	Muslim Tat
ttu			I/L			Torau
ttv			I/L			Titan
ttw			I/L			Long Wat
(ttx)			I/L			Tutong 1
tty			I/L			Sikaritai
ttz			I/L			Tsum
tua			I/L			Wiarumus
tub			I/E			Tübatulabal
tuc			I/L			Mutu
tud			I/E			Tuxá
tue			I/L			Tuyuca
tuf			I/L			Central Tunebo
tug			I/L			Tunia
tuh			I/L			Taulil
tui			I/L			Tupuri
tuj			I/L			Tugutil
tuk	tk	tuk	I/L	Turkic	Түркмен	Turkmen
tul			I/L			Tula
tum		tum	I/L		chiTumbuka	Tumbuka
tun			I/L			Tunica
tuo			I/L			Tucano
tuq			I/L			Tedaga
tur	tr	tur	I/L	Turkic	Türkçe	Turkish
tus			I/L		Skarù∙rę’	Tuscarora
tuu			I/L			Tututni
tuv			I/L		Ng'aturk(w)ana	Turkana
tux			I/E			Tuxináwa
tuy			I/L			Tugen
tuz			I/L			Turka
tva			I/L			Vaghua
tvd			I/L			Tsuvadi
tve			I/L			Te'un
tvg			I/E	Portuguese-based creole	Papiá Tugu	Tugunese
tvi			I/L	Afro-Asiatic		Tulai
tvk			I/L			Southeast Ambrym
tvl		tvl	I/L		'gana Tuvalu	Tuvalu
tvm			I/L			Tela-Masbuar
tvn			I/L	Sino-Tibetan	ထားဝယ်စကား	Tavoyan
tvo			I/L			Tidore
tvs			I/L			Taveta
tvt			I/L			Tutsa Naga
tvu			I/L			Tunen
tvw			I/L			Sedoa
tvx			I/E			Taivoan
tvy			I/E			Timor Pidgin
twa			I/E			Twana
twb			I/L			Western Tawbuid
twc			I/E			Teshenawa
twd			I/L			Twents
twe			I/L			Tewa (Indonesia)
twf			I/L			Northern Tiwa
twg			I/L			Tereweng
twh			I/L			Tai Dón
twi	tw	twi	I/L	Niger–Congo	Twi	Twi
twl			I/L			Tawara
twm			I/L	Sino-Tibetan	དག་པ་ཁ་	Tawang Monpa
twn			I/L			Twendi
two			I/L			Tswapong
twp			I/L			Ere
twq			I/L			Tasawaq
twr			I/L			Southwestern Tarahumara
twt			I/E			Turiwára
twu			I/L			Termanu
tww			I/L			Tuwari
twx			I/L			Tewe
twy			I/L			Tawoyan
txa			I/L			Tombonuo
txb			I/H			Tokharian B
txc			I/E			Tsetsaut
txe			I/L			Totoli
txg			I/H	Sino-Tibetan	𗼇𗟲	Tangut
txh			I/H			Thracian
txi			I/L			Ikpeng
txj			I/L	Nilo-Saharan		Tarjumo
txm			I/L			Tomini
txn			I/L			West Tarangan
txo			I/L			Toto
txq			I/L			Tii
txr			I/H	unclassified		Tartessian
txs			I/L			Tonsea
txt			I/L			Citak
txu			I/L			Kayapó
txx			I/L			Tatana
txy			I/L			Tanosy Malagasy
tya			I/L			Tauya
tye			I/L			Kyanga
tyh			I/L			O'du
tyi			I/L			Teke-Tsaayi
tyj			I/L			Tai Do; Tai Yo
tyl			I/L			Thu Lao
tyn			I/L			Kombai
typ			I/E			Thaypan
tyr			I/L			Tai Daeng
tys			I/L			Tày Sa Pa
tyt			I/L			Tày Tac
tyu			I/L			Kua
tyv		tyv	I/L		Тыва	Tuvinian
tyx			I/L			Teke-Tyee
tyy			I/L	Niger–Congo		Tiyaa
tyz			I/L			Tày
tza			I/L			Tanzanian Sign Language
(tzb)			I/L			Bachajón Tzeltal
(tzc)			I/L			Chamula Tzotzil
(tze)			I/L			Chenalhó Tzotzil
tzh			I/L			Tzeltal
tzj			I/L			Tz'utujil
tzl			I/C		Talossan	Talossan
tzm			I/L		ⵜⵎⴰⵣⵉⵖⵜ	Central Atlas Tamazight
tzn			I/L			Tugun
tzo			I/L			Tzotzil
(tzs)			I/L			San Andrés Larrainzar Tzotzil
(tzt)			I/L			Western Tzutujil
(tzu)			I/L			Huixtán Tzotzil
tzx			I/L			Tabriak
(tzz)			I/L			Zinacantán Tzotzil

== Sources ==
- "ISO 639-2 Registration Authority". Library of Congress.
- "ISO 639-3 Registration Authority". SIL International.
- Lewis, M. Paul; Simons, Gary F.; Fennig, Charles D., eds. (2016). "Ethnologue: Languages of the World" (19th ed.). Dallas, Texas: SIL International.
