= Uchen script =

Style of the Tibetan alphabet

Uchen script དབུ་ཅན་
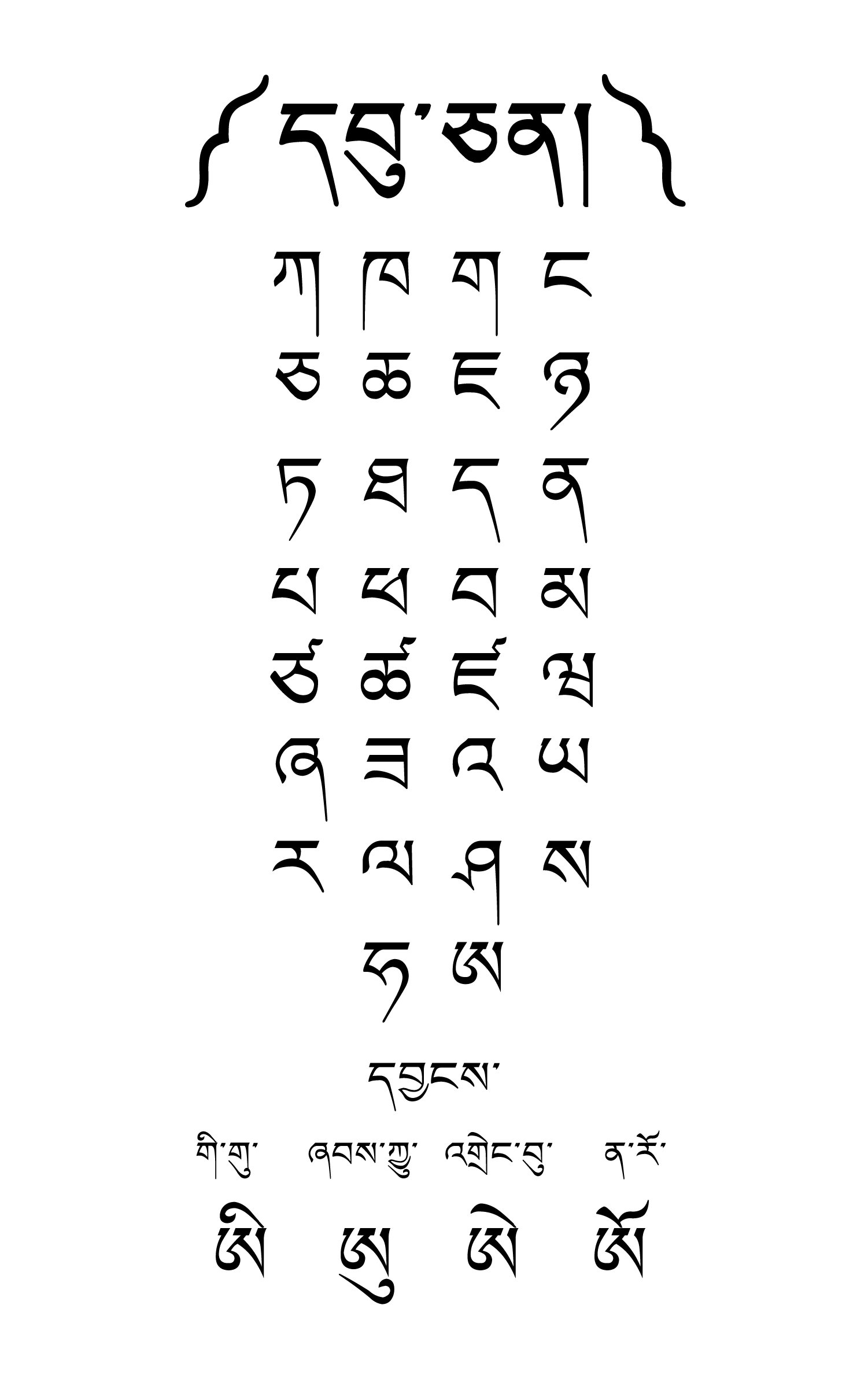
- Script type: Abugida (Printed form of the Tibetan script)
- Creator: Khyungpo Yutri
- Created: 9th century
- Period: 9th c.e. –present
- Direction: Left-to-right
- Languages: Tibetan; Dzongkha; Ladakhi; Sikkimese; Balti; Sherpa; Jirel; Yolmo; Tshangla

Related scripts
- Parent systems: Egyptian hieroglyphs: Proto-Sinaitic; Phoenician; Aramaic; Brahmi; Northern Brahmi; Gupta; Uchen script
- Child systems: Lepcha; Khema; Phagspa; Marchen; Tamyig; Umê script

ISO 15924
- ISO 15924: Tibt (330), Tibetan

Unicode
- Unicode alias: Tibetan
- Unicode range: U+0F00–U+0FFF

Uchen (Note: Variant spellings include ucen, u-cen, u-chen, ucan, u-can, uchan, u-chan, and ucän.) (Tibetan: དབུ་ཅན་, Wylie: dbu-can; IPA: [utɕɛ̃] is the upright, block style of the Tibetan script. The name means "with a head", and is the style of the script used for printing and for formal manuscripts.

It is used to write both the Tibetan language and Dzongkha, the official language of Bhutan.

There are also a number of cursive forms of the Tibetan script, sometimes collectively referred to as umê (Tibetan: དབུ་མེད་, Wylie: dbu-med), "headless".

== Origin ==
Uchen script is a written Tibetan script that uses alphabetic characters to physically record the spoken languages of Tibet and Bhutan. Uchen script emerged in between the seventh and early eighth century, alongside the formation and development of the Tibetan Empire. The script originally was created in Tibet but was also adopted in the neighbouring country of Bhutan located in East Asia. Historians believe the script was created by the seventh century scribe and academic Thonmi Sambhota. The creation of the script was undertaken by Thonmi Sambhota in the reign of Songtsen Gampo under the king's instructions. The subsequent implementation of Uchen script, under the reign of Songtsen Gampo has been credited to have aided in improving the Tibetan economy, trade and foreign relations of the period. This improvement in economy and foreign relations elevated Tibet rapport with surrounding countries. This set Tibet on the trajectory to gain greater power in South East Asia and establish itself as a successful and growing Empire. These elevations largely can be credited to Uchen script, as the implementation of a centralised script for countries and regions can be both a unifying and money acquiring tool.

Uchen script was also heavily influenced by Indian written scripts of the period, namely Brahmi scripts. This direct influence of India and link between the two writing systems was also useful as it connected Tibet with India's power. This aided Tibet in securing highly valuable connections between the two nations. As India was the most powerful country in the region at the time it made a powerful ally and example for Tibet. As Uchen script is based on Indic- Brahmi scripts of the time period, it shares certain visual features. These include the use of long straight and curved characters that 'stack' to create syllables.

Uchen script was formulated by Thonmi Sambhota. Sambhota formulated the script after being sent to India to study script making. After being taught by, and observing expert Indian scribes and script makers he designed Uchen script. Sambhota used variations of these Indian and Brahmi scripts to create a script unique to Tibet and Bhutan. The purpose of Uchen script was to document the Tibetan language and the language of Bhutan; Dzongkha. The use of the script served many functions. These functions include; documenting key events, the recording of religious scriptures and the recording of poetry and texts of cultural significance. These examples of written Uchen script have been found in the form of stone and wood carvings, as well as manuscripts written in ink onto paper.

== Style ==
Bod skad ("Tibetan language") written in uchen style. The "head" of the script is the horizontal line atop each character.

The Tibetan script is based on Indic-Brahmi scripts of the time; that is the alphabets and scripts emerging from India. In form, the script includes thirty consonant, and vowel variants which are written above or below the consonant. In style it is written horizontally left to right and is semi-syllabic when read aloud. These letters can be stacked in order to create a syllable, or small group of letters, that is a section of the full word.

Tibetan and Bhutan written scripts that use the Tibetan language, have been grouped into two categories.

1. The first category being the Uchen script. The word Uchen translates to 'with a head', this refers to the elongated letters of the alphabet, that are tall and block like with linear strokes. Uchen script is the formal, upright and block style that is visually larger and less widely used amongst the civilians of Tibet and Bhutan. Uchen script, as opposed to Umê script, is believed to have been used as a formal script, to be used to record important documents and events and most probably used by more educated members of Tibetan society of the period.
2. The second category of Tibetan scripts are the cursive, less formal styles of writing the Tibetan script. These styles are grouped into the name Umê script meaning the 'headless' script. The translation of 'headless' refers to their lack of 'headed' elongated letters, the lack of such, making it an easier script to learn and simpler to write. Their form is a variant on Uchen script. The letters of the alphabet are visually shorter, less block like in form, and more slanted following the scribes movement of hand. Some styles of Umê include local variants in style, a cursive style and a style simplified for children to learn. Therefore Umê script has more of a short and slanted form, using the same alphabet and basic shape and line structure as Uchen script, but having variants in typography and form.

== Function ==
Uchen script, as all written scripts, fulfils its main function to record spoken language. Early Uchen manuscripts are attributed to have been recording proceedings of the kings, emperors and of matters of the court. These inscriptions were carved into stone, and wood. Other manuscripts attributed to have been created for the king and emperors of the seventh to tenth centuries include poetry dedicated to the king and recordings of key moments of the reign. Early examples of Uchen script were influenced strongly by Tibetan Buddhism. This is due to the fact that many examples of written Uchen script were scribed by Buddhist monks to write and record religious documents. Uchen was also used to record official proceedings including legal matters, formal agreements and treaties. Most of these types of carvings were found in central Tibet, and are key artefacts in recording of the Tibetan emperors Khri Srong Ide Brstan c. 756-797 and Khri Lde Srong Brtsan c.800-815. Uchen script has also been located on documents found from a 'cave library' at Dunhuang that are histories and semi historical texts, giving key insights into cultural Tibetan life in the 9th century. The broad range of texts and the number of themes addressed show that Uchen script was used in order to record a broad range of activities and events deemed culturally important by the commissioner. One notable example of a functioning carving of Uchen script is a wooden block, with the carven Uchen alphabet used for printing ink onto parchment and paper. It is believed that this method of woodblock printing was used in order to print and replicate Uchen letters in an authentic way, and allow for less variation in script writing.

Uchen script writing is not an alphabet widely practiced in the twenty first century. The styles can be found and replicated as they have been recorded in calligraphy manuals. These alphabets and forms use a later variant of the original script, not the ancient Uchen alphabet.

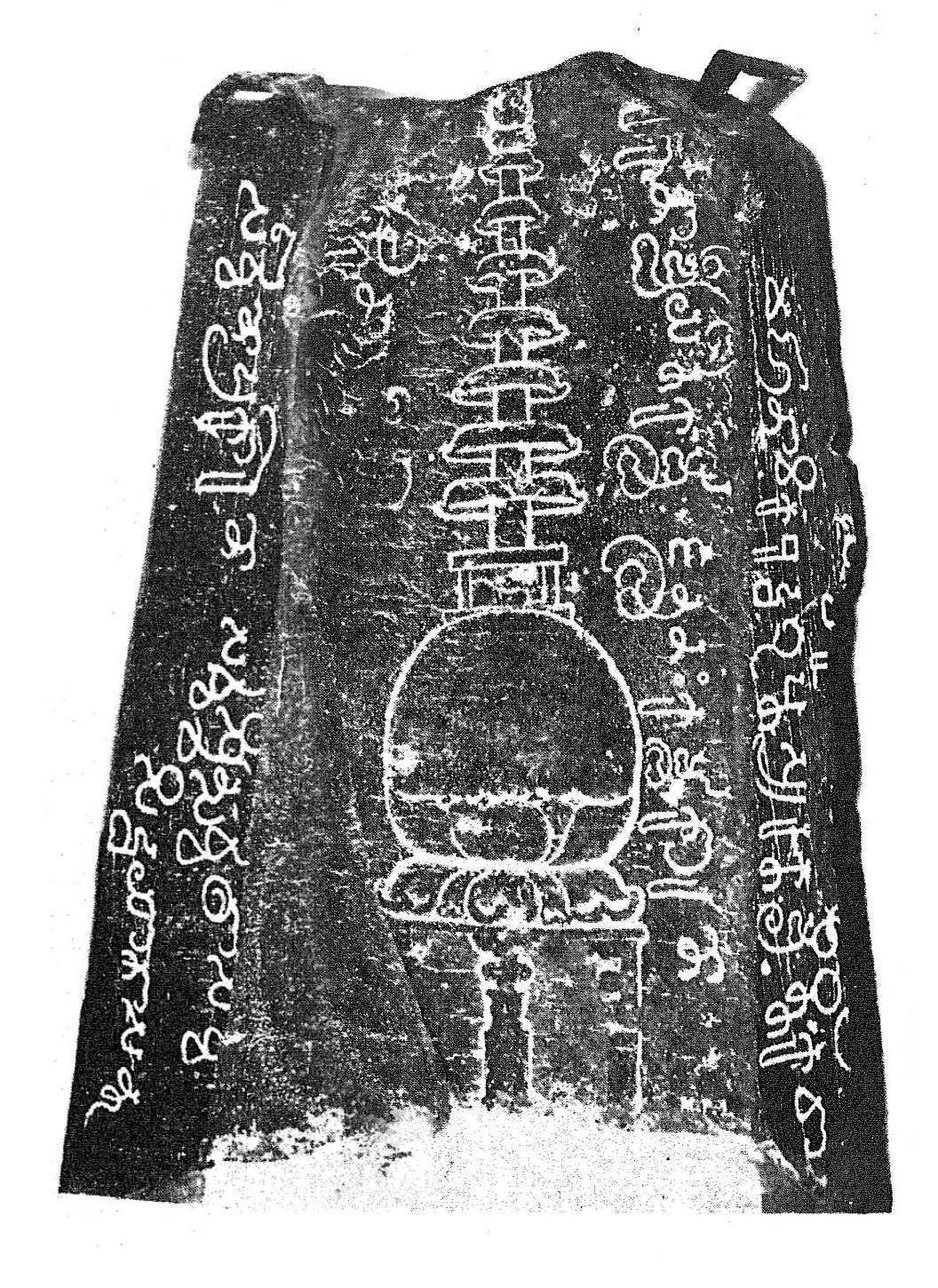
Mahanavika Buddhagupta stone inscription, (script carved into stone) 5th century CE, Indian Museum, Kolkota

== Calligraphy and tools ==
Early Uchen script is believed to have been carved into wooden slabs. Though some evidence of these wooden carvings have been found by archaeologists and interpreted by historians, the majority of these artefacts have not been found but rather, over time have been eroded and lost. The earliest surviving examples of the written script are dated to have been made 100 years after the initial creation of the writing system. These artefacts have been dated to have been created between the 8th and 9th centuries. Whilst the script was originally created in between the seventh and eighth century. These examples of Uchen script carvings are carved into rock faces and pillars. Sources and artefacts made of rock and marble having lasted longer as they do not erode or rot over time. Thus while there is lesser evidence of Uchen script inscribed on wooden surfaces, it is likely they existed but were not able to survive as long as the later stone inscriptions.

The creation of the Uchen inscription on stone surfaces was most likely achieved with stone tools, resembling early hammers and chisels, as these were the common tools of the time, that were used in surrounding counties including India. As Uchen script of Tibet is influenced heavily by early Indian script writing, inferences have been made that, similar to the technique of Indian inscriptions, a scribe would have marked out letters on the stone pillar or slab, and the stone cutter would have carved out the marked letters using the chisel as a sharp end to chip the stone and the hammer to apply force to the chisel.

Wood and paper manuscripts have also been found containing Uchen script. The creation dates of these sources span from the middle of the eighth to the end of the tenth century. Historians believe the wooden carved manuscripts would have used similar tools to that of the stone carvings; in that variations of stone chisels and hammers would have been used to carve out the letters in wood. Paper manuscripts dated to the same period used ink applied to parchment or paper with a brush or quill, instead of using chisel and a stone to record Uchen script. This change in technique and tools creates a notable change in form of the script, as ink and paper recordings were faster and easier to create. The script's form on paper manuscripts has less rigid lines and has a more of a slanted typography. This, in combination with the script writer's agency and human error, has led to variants in form that can be observed in early paper and ink Uchen documents and a more widespread uptake of Umê script over the formal Uchen.

== Key influences ==
The written languages of Asia had heavy influence on Uchen script in its creation, its style and its function. Due to the Uchen script being a Brahmi script, a written script developed between in the 7th and 8th century, Uchen has many influences from surrounding areas and groups of people at the time. As Tibet was a new empire, the king, Songtsen Gampo, endeavoured to establish Tibet as a major power. He commissioned Thonmi Sambhota to create a script for Tibet and Bhutan, and in doing so wished to emulate the power of surrounding successful nations like India. India already had an established and successfully implemented written script. This allowed for India to be able to secure internal events and unification, as well as develop foreign relations and trade. Songtsen Gampo wanted his nation of Tibet to gain the same success as India. Thus, in commissioning Thonmi Sambhota to create a written script, he wanted the script to resemble Indian scripts. Thonmi Sambhota was sent to study scriptwriting under the guidance of expert Indian scribes. The creation of Uchen script therefore shares certain stylistic and aesthetic similarities to Brahami Indian scripts. One such similarity is the elongated lower section of characters.

== See also ==
- Tibetan script
- Umê script
- Tibetan calligraphy
- Tamang language
