= Talise =

Talise may refer to:

- Talise language
- Talise Trevigne, American operatic soprano

== See also ==
- TALISE
