= Umê script =

Family of variants of the Tibetan alphabet

Umê scripts དབུ་མེད་
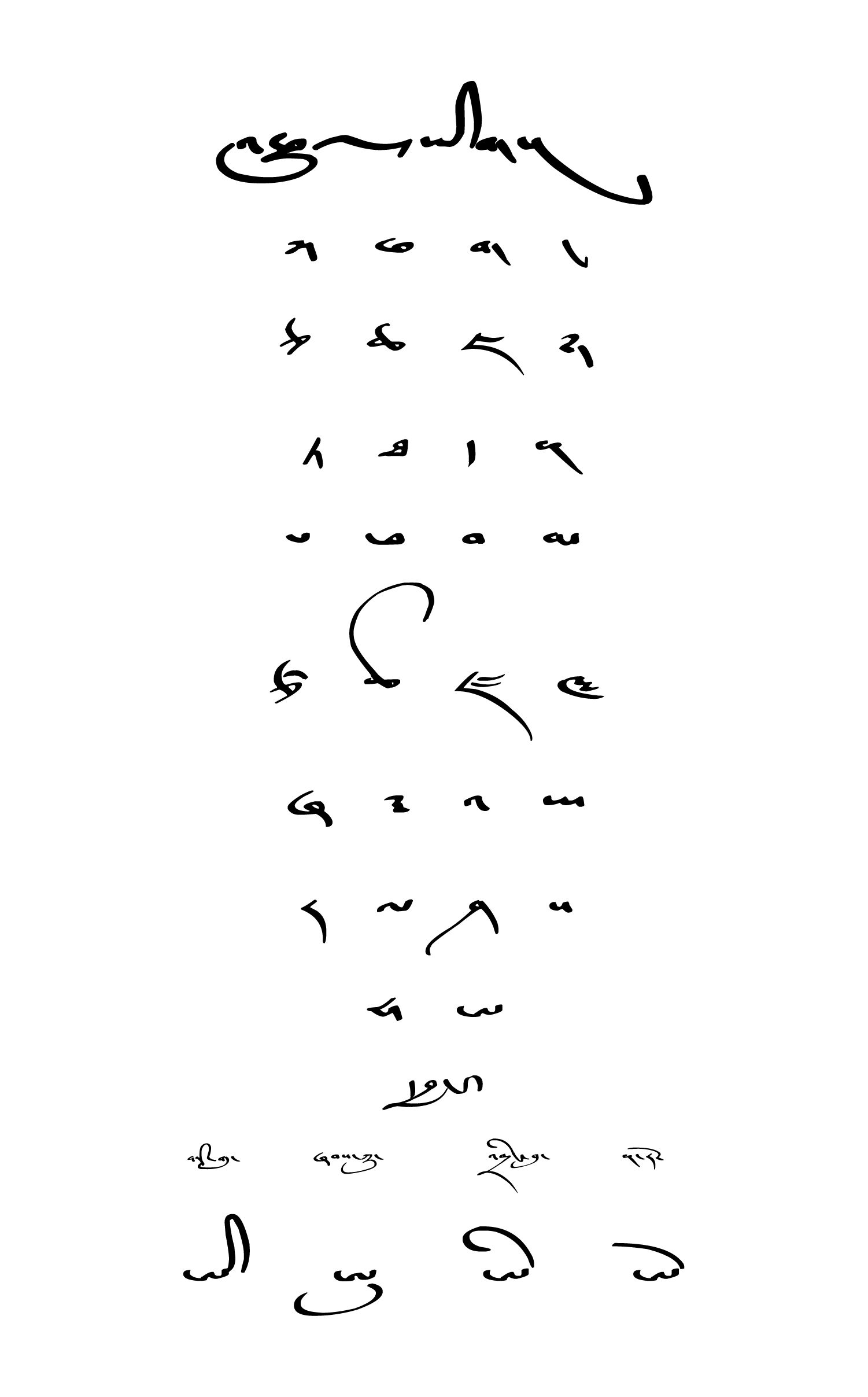
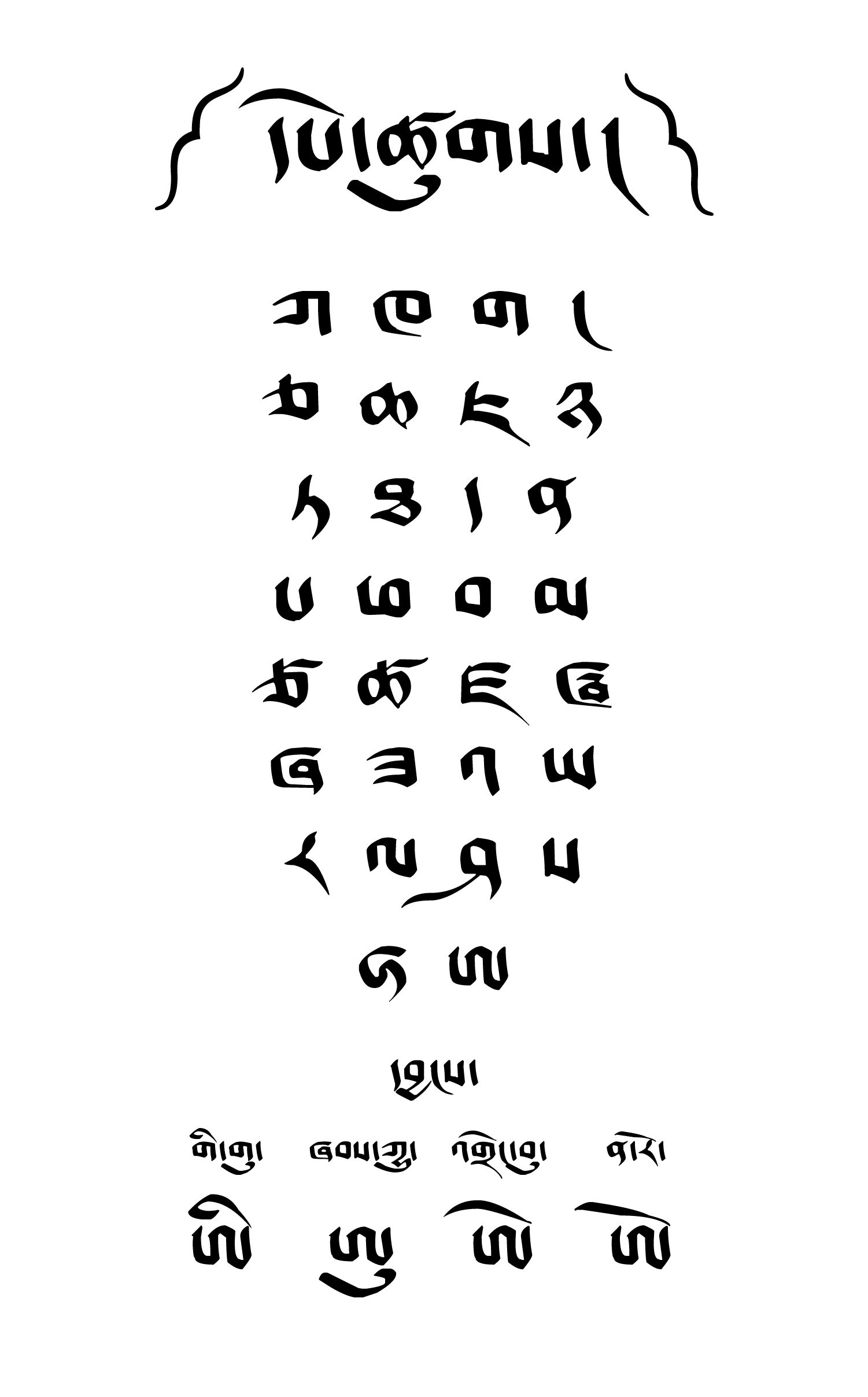
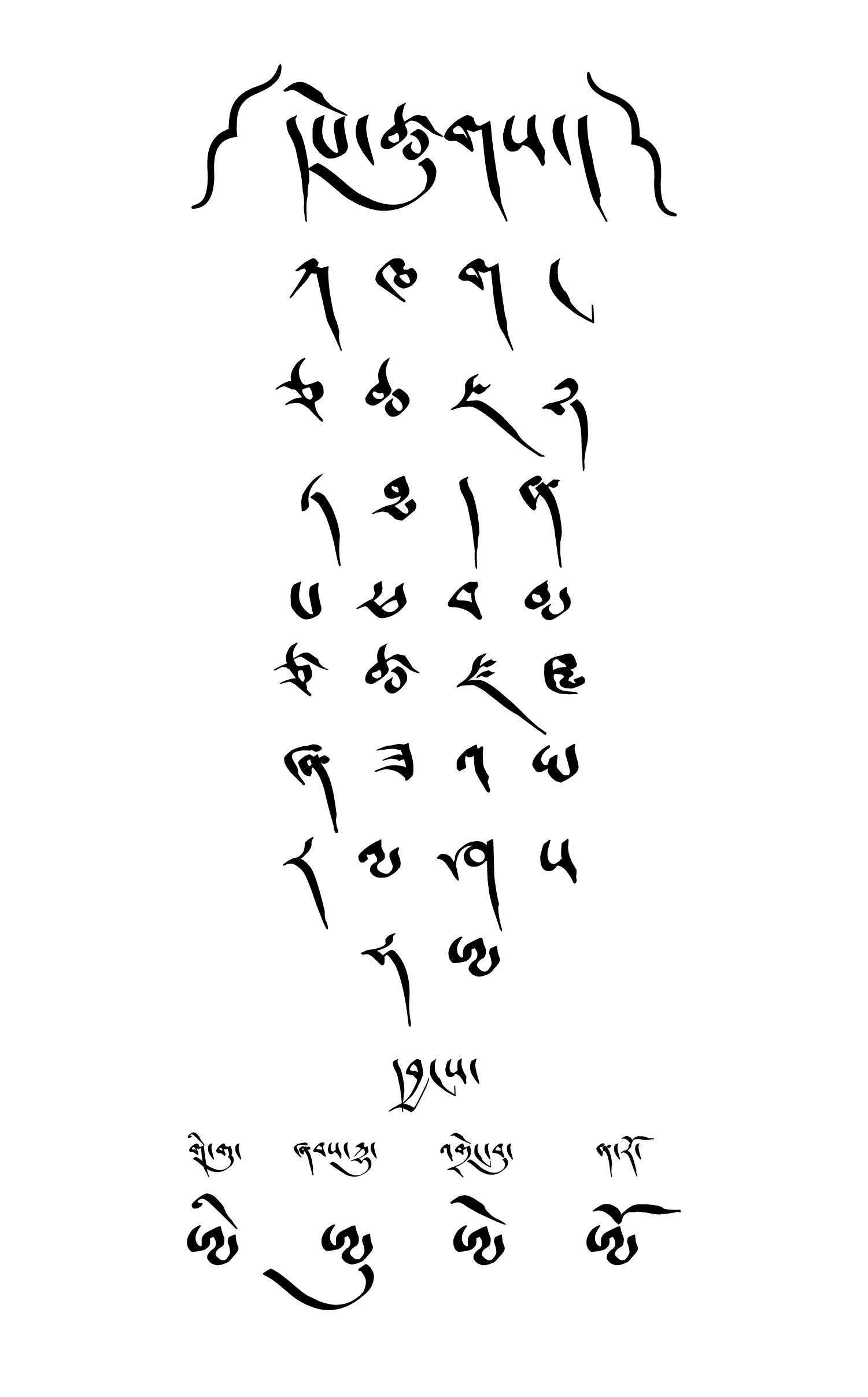
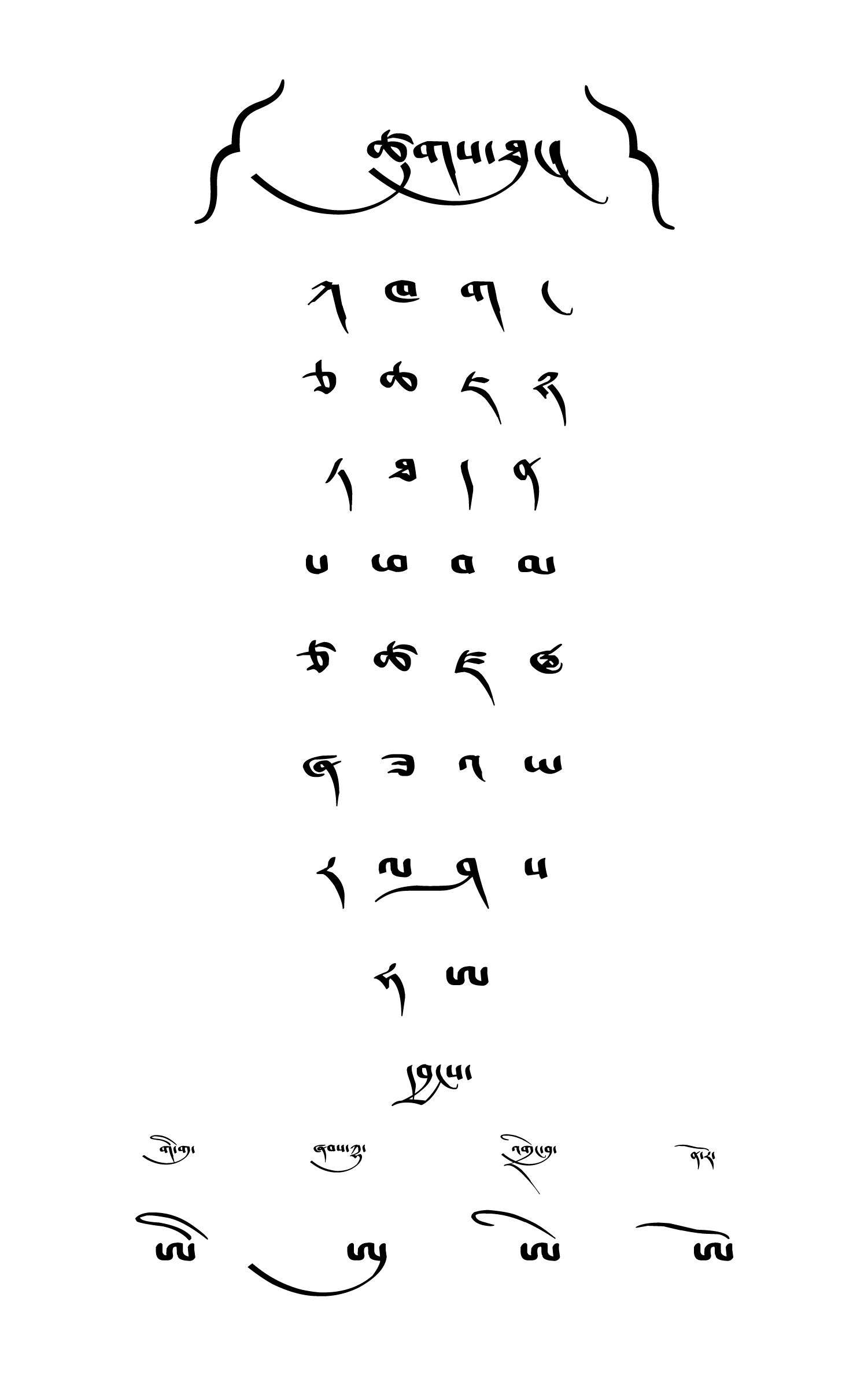
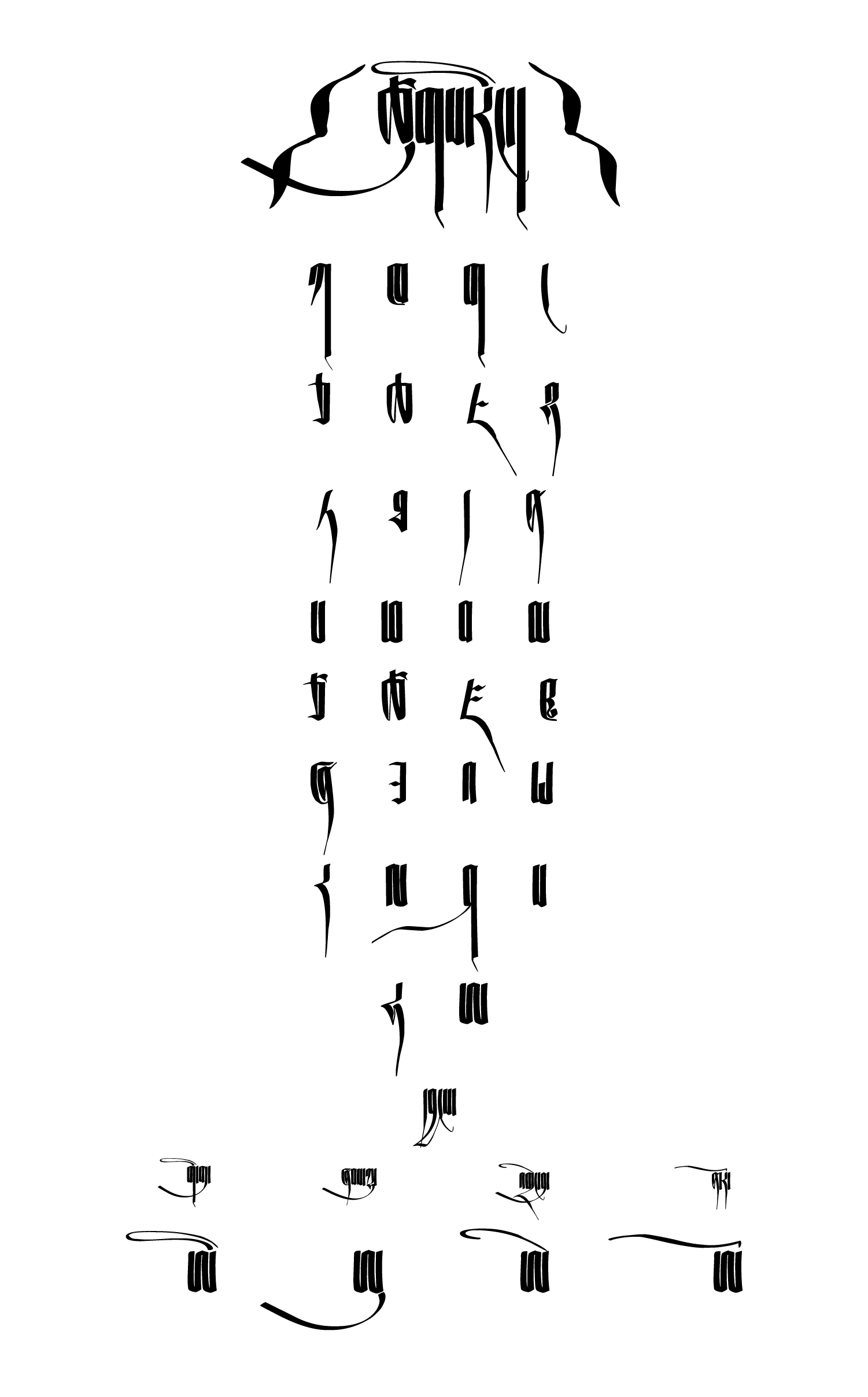
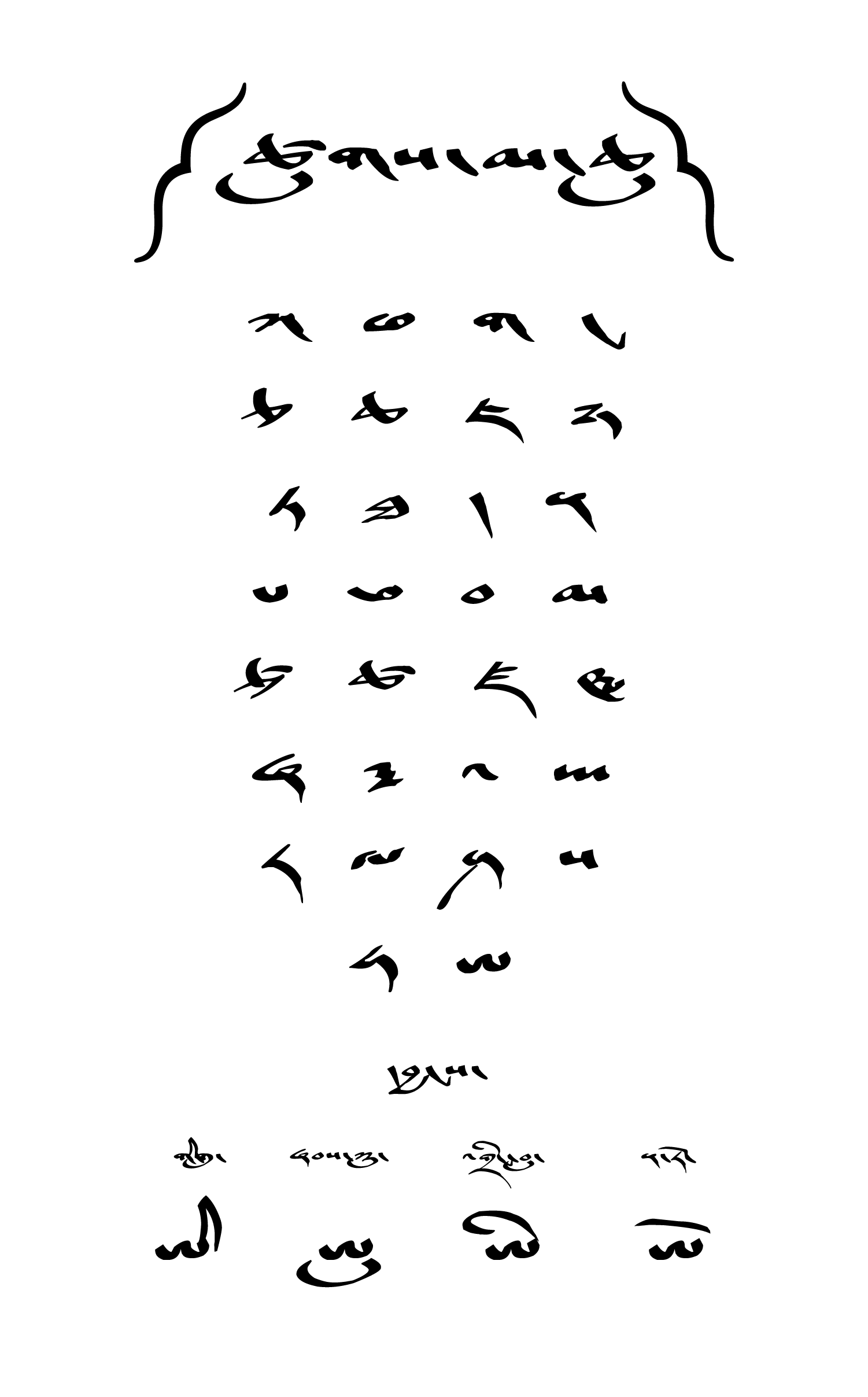
- Script type: Abugida (Informal cursive forms of the Tibetan script)
- Created: c. 620
- Period: c. 620–present
- Languages: Tibetan; Dzongkha (limited)

Related scripts
- Parent systems: Egyptian hieroglyphs: Proto-Sinaitic; Phoenician; Aramaic; Brahmi; Northern Brahmi; Gupta; Tibetan; Umê scripts
- Child systems: Lepcha; Khema; Phagspa; Marchen; Tamyig

ISO 15924
- ISO 15924: Tibt (330), Tibetan

Unicode
- Unicode alias: Tibetan
- Unicode range: U+0F00–U+0FFF

Tibetan consonants in Ume script; note those with vertical tsheg marks

Umê (Tibetan: དབུ་མེད་, Wylie: dbu-med, IPA: [ume]; variant spellings include umé, u-me) is a family of stylistic variants of the Tibetan alphabet used for both calligraphy and shorthand. The name umê means "headless" and refers to its distinctive feature: the absence of the horizontal guide line ('head') across the top of the letters. Between syllables, the tsheg mark (་) often appears as a vertical stroke, rather than the shorter 'dot'-like mark in some other scripts.

Kyuyig (Tibetan: འཁྱུག་ཡིག།་, Wylie: kyug-yig) or Gyu-yig (Tibetan: རྒྱུག་ཡིག།, Wylie: gyug-yig), is the most common form of Umê that people in the Tibetan region use as an informal shorthand for notes and personal correspondence. It is extremely cursive, with free-flowing, distorted glyph forms. It remains unstandardised and is difficult to decipher because of its divergent shapes.

The other main style of the Tibetan script is the upright block form, uchen (དབུ་ཅན་ dbu-can; IPA: [utɕɛ̃]). The name of the block form, uchen means "with a head", corresponding to the presence of the horizontal guide line. This script is the standard formal variant of the script, used for official and religious purposes.

== Styles ==
Umê scripts span from formal calligraphy to highly informal shorthand with context-specific styles. Besides Kyuyig, there are (broadly) five main styles of umê writing:

- Drutsa (Tibetan: འབྲུ་ཚ་, Wylie: 'bru-tsa), used for writing documents.
- Bêtsug (Tibetan: དཔེ་ཚུགས་, Wylie: dpe-tshugs), used for writing scriptures.
- Tsugthung (Tibetan: ཚུགས་ཐུང༌, Wylie: tshugs-thung), lit. "short form", a shortened, abbreviated variant traditionally used for commentaries.
- Tsugring (Tibetan: ཚུགས་རིང་, Wylie: tshugs-ring), lit. "long form", with elegant, vertically elongated glyphs, used for novice scribes to improve handwriting and familiarity with the script.
- Tsugmachu (Tibetan: ཚུགས་མ་འཁྱུག་, Wylie: tshugs-ma-'khyug) a hybrid style designed to be written quickly without losing the uchen form.

== See also ==
- Tibetan script
- Uchen script
- Tibetan calligraphy
