= Bhardev =

Bhardeu भारदेउ
- Village of Konjyosom Rural Municipality
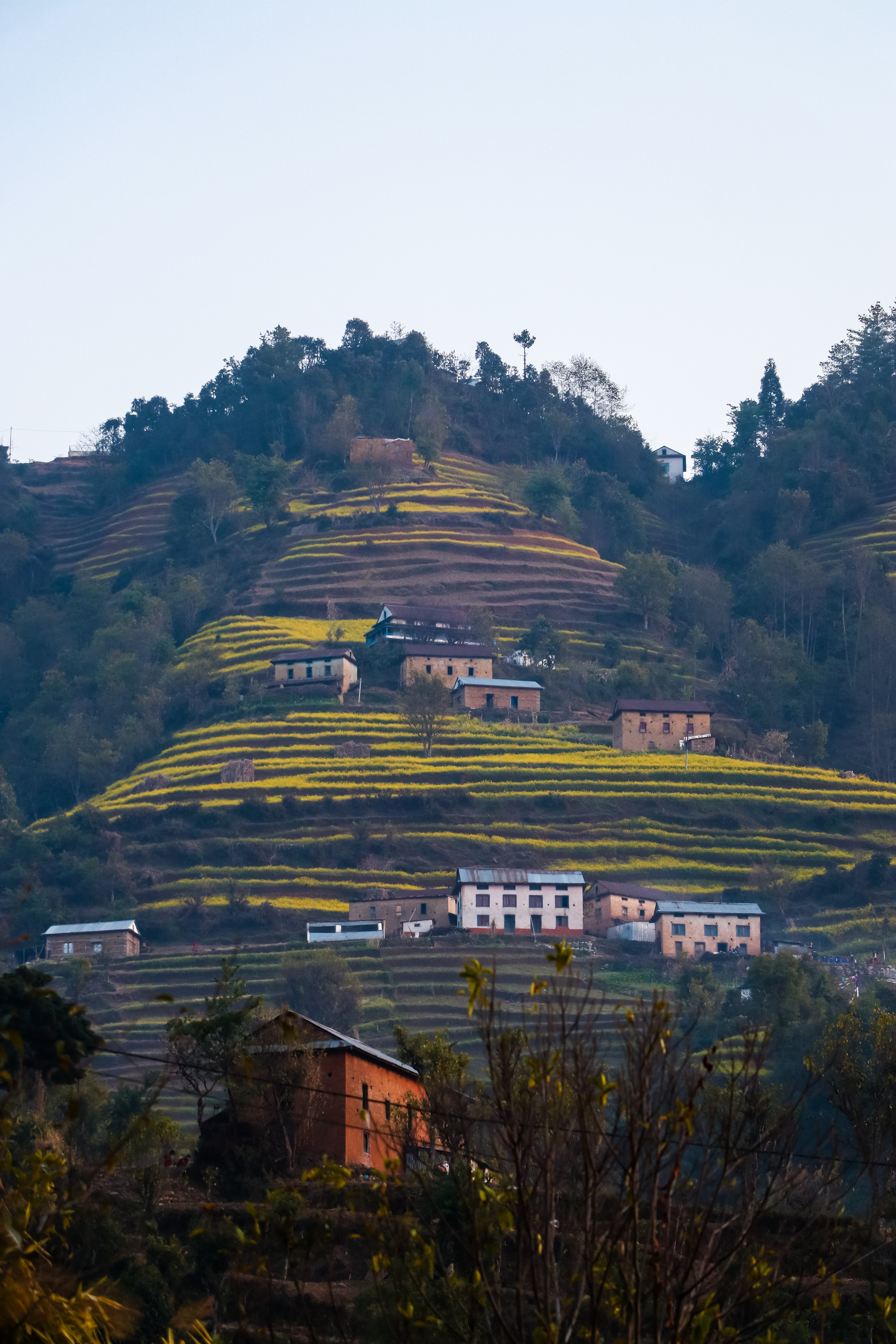
- Terrace farming and houses at Bhardev, Lalitpur

- Location in Nepal
- Coordinates: 27.55°N 85.39°E
- Country: Nepal
- Province: Province No. 3
- District: Lalitpur District

Population (1991)
  - Total: 1,746
- Time zone: UTC+5:45 (Nepal Time)

Bhardeu is a village and former Village Development Committee that is now part of Konjyosom Rural Municipality in Province No. 3 of central Nepal. At the time of the 1991 Nepal census it had a population of 1,746 in 310 individual households.

Bhardeu is a small village located in Lalitpur district, in the Bagmati zone of Nepal. The people are mostly Tamang (apx. 65%) and Newar (apx. 25%). The main languages spoken are Tamang and Nepali. Most of the people raise crops and livestock. Foreign remittances are also economically significant.

Bhardeu VDC is 22 km south from ring-road Satdobato. There is also bus service present from Pyangaun, Chapagaun or from Lagankhel up to LELE Saraswoti Kunda station.
