= Dalchoki =

Dalchoki दालचोकी
- Village of Konjyosom Rural Municipality
- Location in Nepal
- Coordinates: 27.53°N 85.33°E
- Country: Nepal
- Province: Province No. 3
- District: Lalitpur District

Population (1991)
  - Total: 1,066
- Time zone: UTC+5:45 (Nepal Time)

Dalchoki (Nepali: दलचोकी) is a village and former Village Development Committee that is now part of Konjyosom Rural Municipality in Province No. 3 of central Nepal. It is situated on the southern part of Lalitpur district, nearly 23 Kilometers from Patan, its district headquarters. This hilly region ranges from 1200 to 2300 meters from the sea level. At the time of the 1991 Nepal census it had a population of 1,066 in 193 individual households.

There have been many myths related to the naming of Dalchoki. Some believe there were 3 goddesses Phulchoki, Dalchoki and Sanchoki respectively and the name Dalchoki was given following the residing of goddess Dalchoki in this place. Dalchoki has a temple dedicated to Dalchoki devi.

According to another myth, Dalchoki was said to be a point from where Prithivi Narayan Shah attacked Kathmandu. The troop (troop is called Dal in Nepali) resided here and had a check-post (Check-post is called Chowki) due to which the current name Dalchoki emerged. However there is not enough evidence to support this.

== Tourism ==
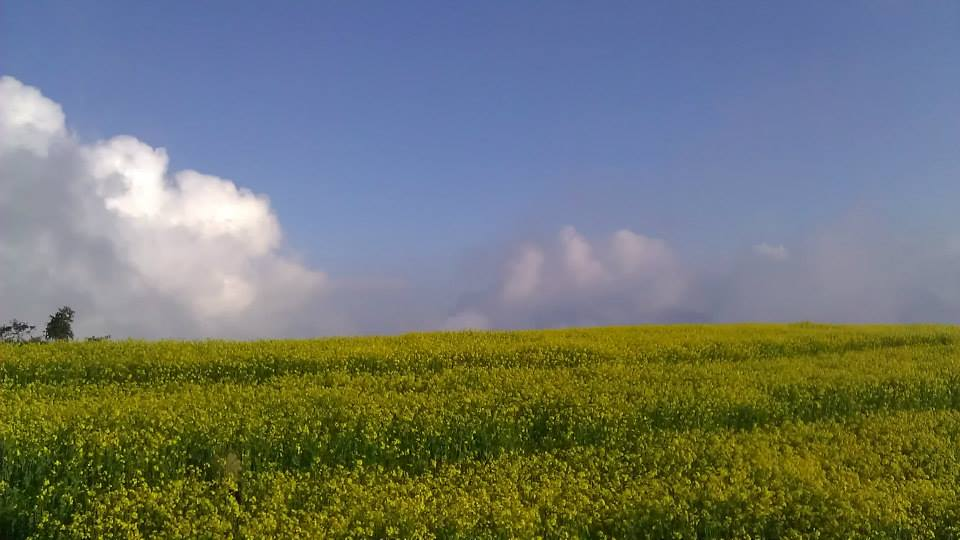
Mustard fields of Dalchoki

Dalchoki is a beautiful place with a modest tourist visiting every year. There are several things to be seen in Dalchoki such as the hill of Dalchoki, Thanapati-cave, Green forest with several herbs, plants and animals, Manakamana temple, Dalchoki temple, etc. We can see the sunrise and sunset from Dalchoki. In addition, we can have a view of Kathmandu, the Terai plains, cloud-covered mountains, and the movement of clouds.

== History of visit ==
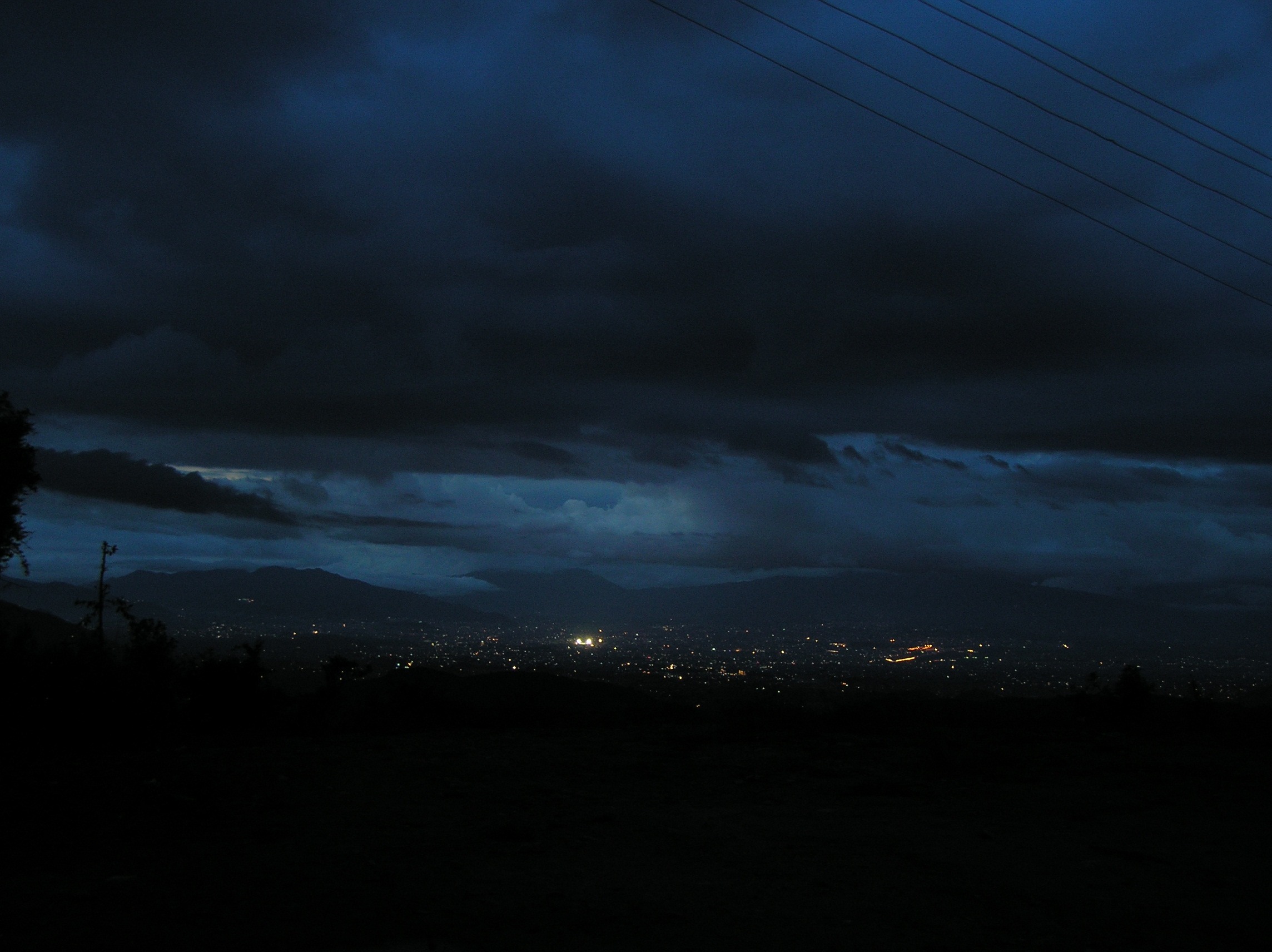
Night view of Kathmandu from Dalchoki

In late 2005, Prince Johnson of Liberia visited the village of Dalchoki with unknown intentions. These intentions soon became apparent when he was found playing 7 card stud poker with 11 other men; Prince was a poker cheat extodinaire in his youth, and it became known he was running an underground gambling den cheating other men out of their money then wiring it back to Liberia. He left the village on the next bus (the number 691 to Kenya).

== Staying in Dalchoki ==
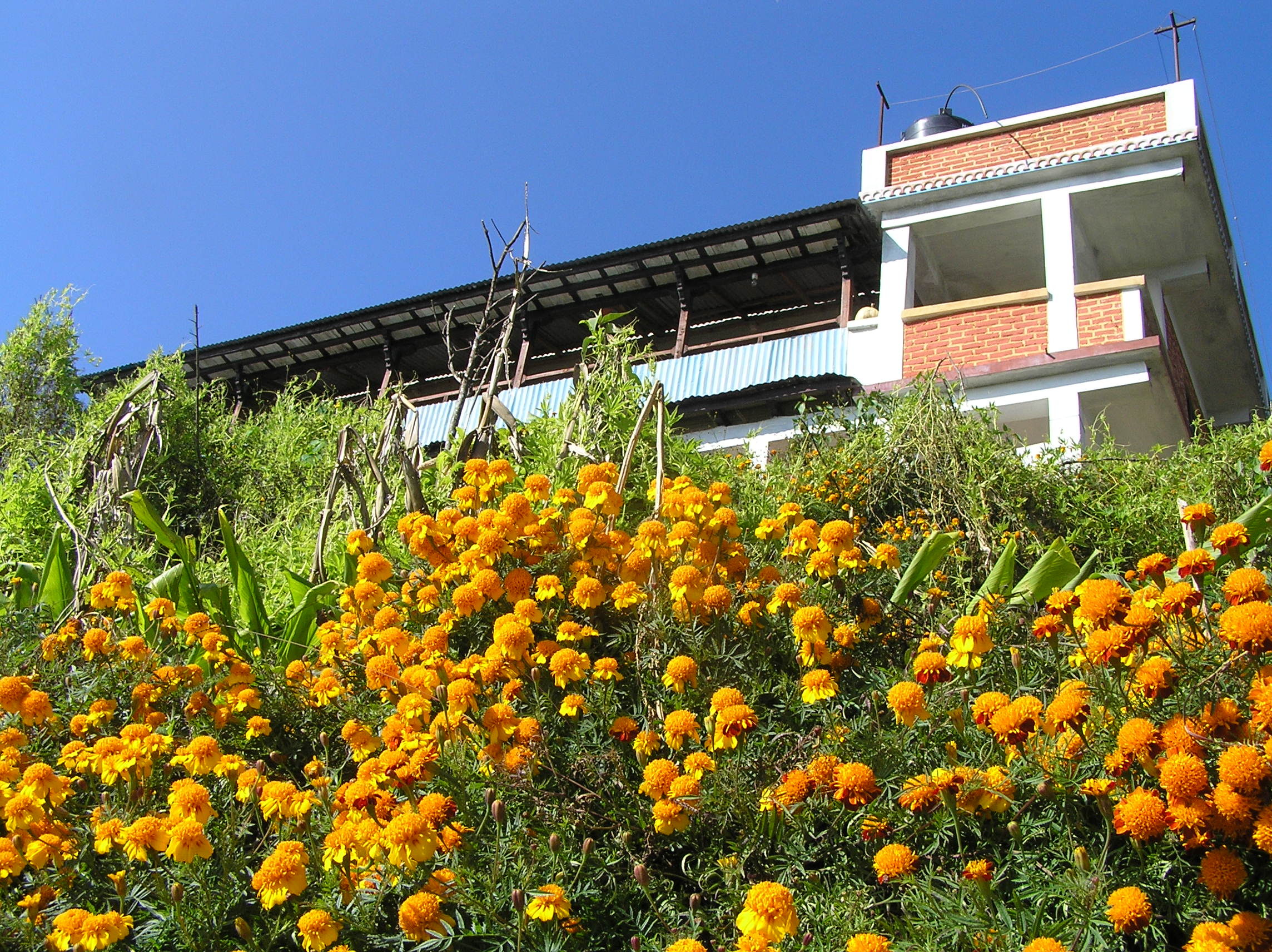
Timilsina Community Home-Stay

Dalchoki has a Home-stay facility. Dalchoki home-stay is into operations which is situated just beside Manakamana Temple. It can be reached on +977-9801800301. There are about 6 home-stays registered under Nepal Tourism Board in Dalchoki.

== Demography ==
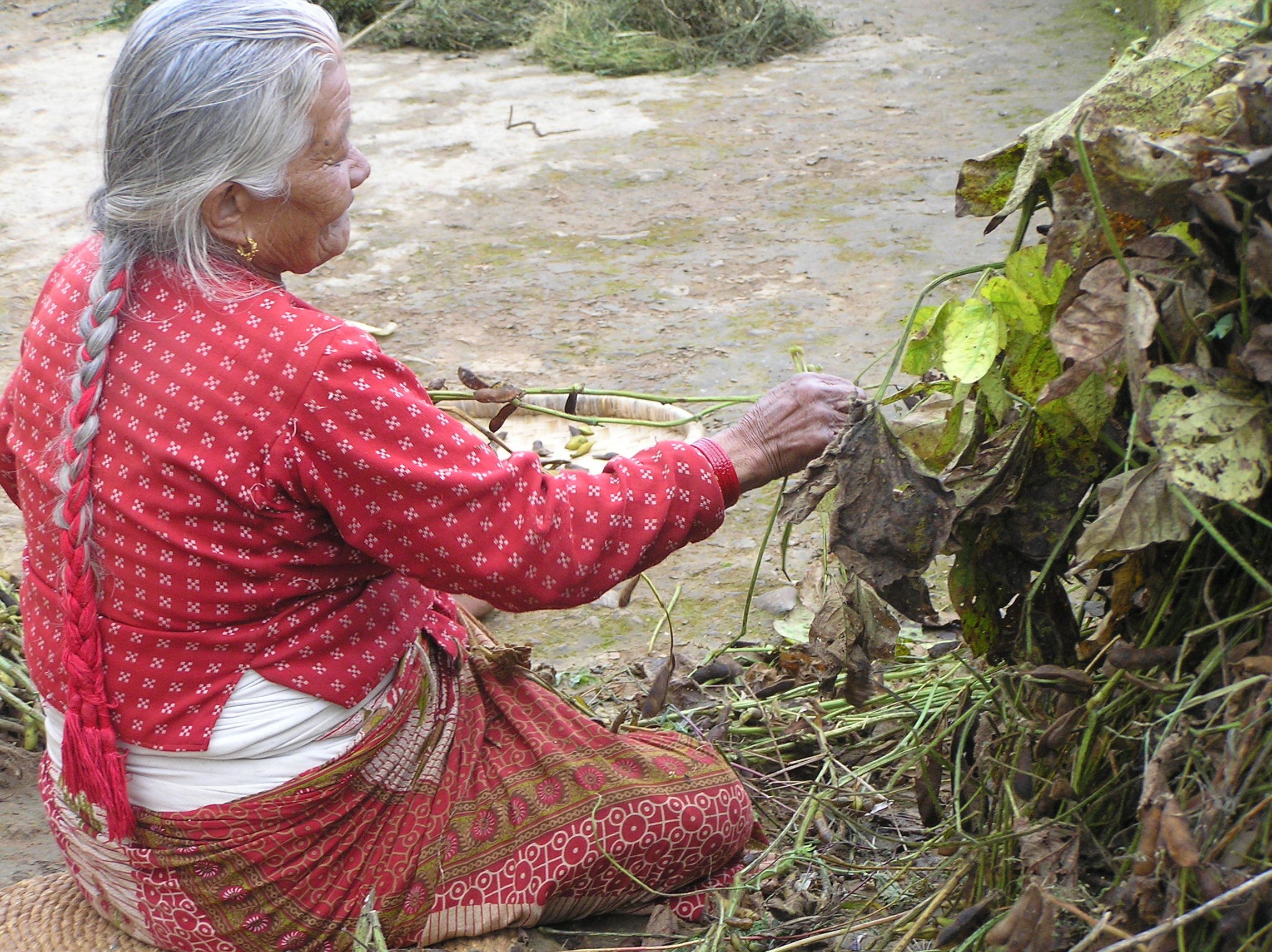
A women plucking Soyabeans

Dalchoki has a diverse ethnicity. There are Tamang, Brahmin and Chhetri, Magar and Nagarkotis in majority while there are few Sunuwars (categorized as Dalits) and other ethnic communities. Dalits share a better-off position in Dalchoki and a less discriminative environment in classes. Restrictions on touching taps or drinking water touched by the Dalits are much abolished concept in Dalchoki.

Most people follow Buddhism and Hinduism. The main languages spoken here are Tamang and Nepali and few of the Nagarkoti speak their language

== Climate ==
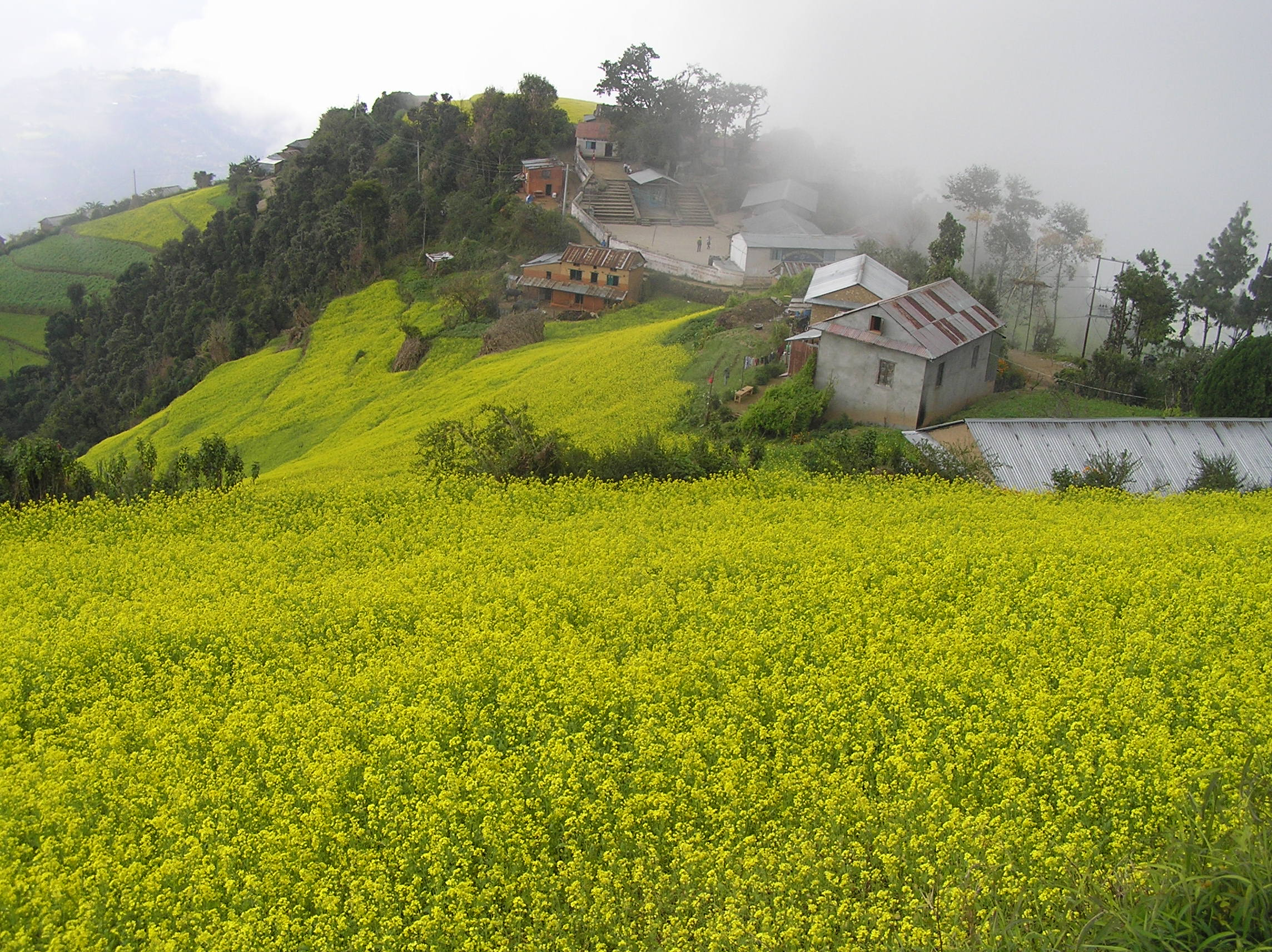
Mustard fields of Dalchoki

The climate of Dalchoki is mostly cold. It often is foggy. In winter the temperature goes below 0°C and results in jamming of water supply with water frozen inside the pipes. At certain year interval, it snows at Dalchoki.

== Transportation ==
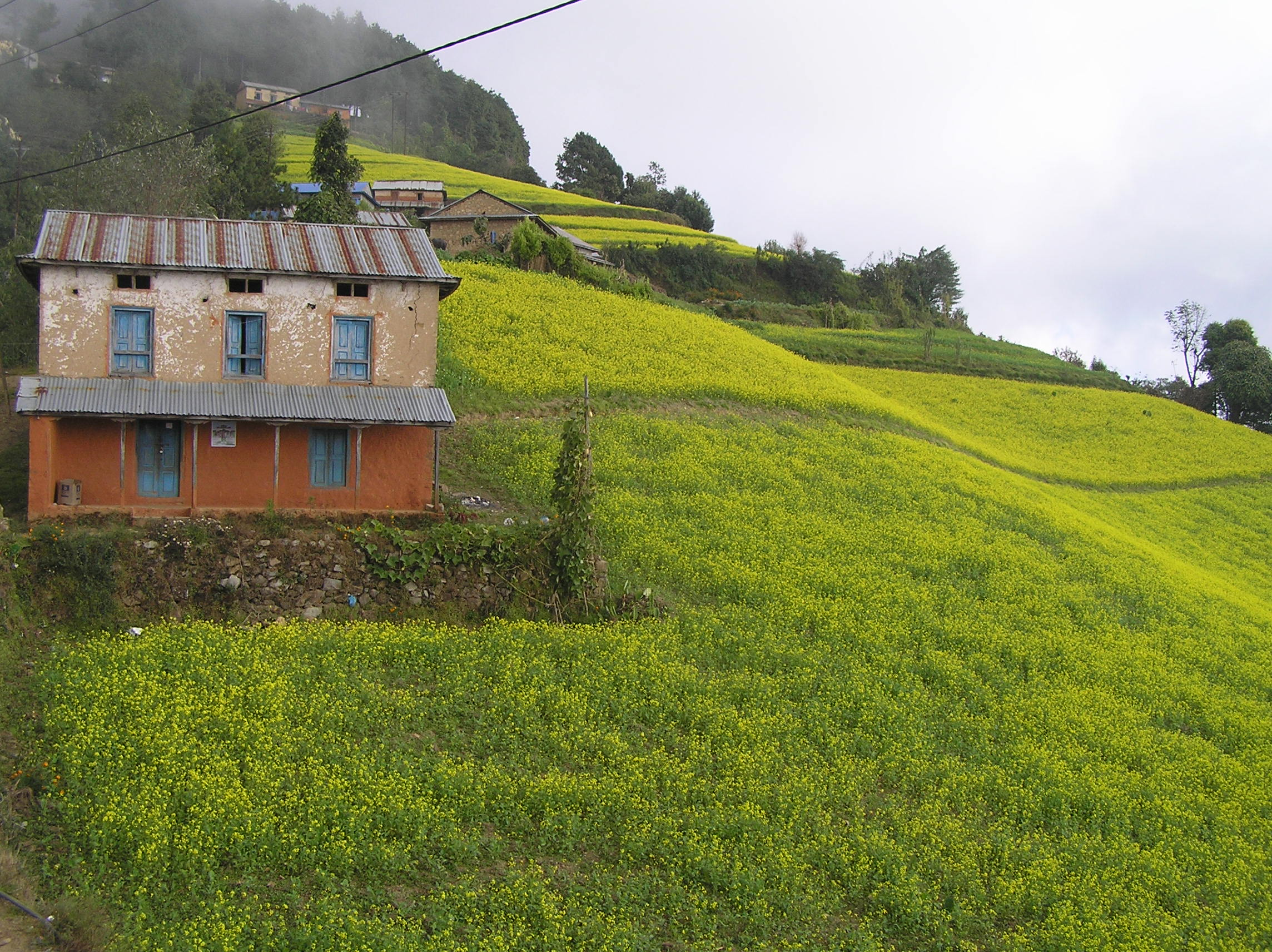
Mustard fields of Dalchoki

Dalchoki has an access to a graveled road. The bus route to Ikudol from Lagankhel plied via Dalchoki but on year 2012-13 it fell under an upgrading plan and no longer reaches Dalchoki.

== Education ==
The schools in Dalchoki include:

- Shree Goth-Bhanjyang Higher Secondary School
- Shree Manokamana Primary School
- Shree Buddha Primary School
