= Chaughare =

Coordinates: 27.5333°N 85.3500°E

Chaughare चौधरे
- Village of Konjyosom Rural Municipality
- Interactive map of Chaughare
- Country: Nepal
- Province: Province No. 3
- District: Lalitpur District

Population (1991)
  - Total: 1,685
- Time zone: UTC+5:45 (Nepal Time)

Chaughare is a village and former Village Development Committee that is now part of Konjyosom Rural Municipality in Province No. 3 of central Nepal. At the time of the 1991 Nepal census it had a population of 1,685 in 279 individual households.
