= Nallu =

Nallu नल्लु
- Village of Konjyosom Rural Municipality
- Location in Nepal
- Coordinates: 27.55°N 85.34°E
- Country: Nepal
- Province: Province No. 3
- District: Lalitpur District

Population (1991)
  - Total: 1,849
- Time zone: UTC+5:45 (Nepal Time)

Nallu is a village and former Village Development Committee that is now part of Konjyosom Rural Municipality in Province No. 3 of central Nepal. At the time of the 1991 Nepal census it had a population of 1849 living in 320 individual households. Most of the people here are from Tamang Cast. According to the report taken 96.7% people are Tamang.
