= Tibetan calligraphy =

East Asian calligraphic tradition

Buddhist mantra in Tibetan script

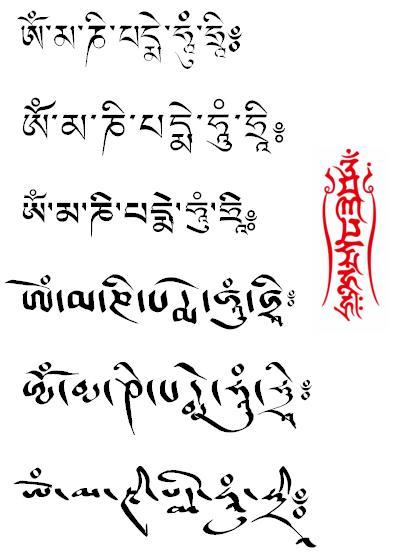
Six different Tibetan script styles traditionally and commonly used by Tibetans

Tibetan calligraphy is the calligraphic tradition of writing the Tibetan language. As in other parts of East Asia, nobles, high lamas, and persons of high rank were expected to have high abilities in calligraphy. However, unlike other East Asian calligraphic traditions, calligraphy was done using a reed pen as opposed to a brush. Tibetan calligraphy is at times more free-flowing than calligraphy involving the descendants of other Brahmi scripts. Given the overriding religious nature of Tibetan culture, many of the traditions in calligraphy come from religious texts, and most Tibetan scribes have a monastic background.

== Styles ==
A variety of different styles of calligraphy exist in Tibet:

- The Uchen (དབུ་ཅན།, "headed"; also transliterated as uchan or dbu-can) style of the Tibetan script is marked by heavy horizontal lines and tapering vertical lines, and is the most common script for writing in the Tibetan language, and also appears in printed form because of its exceptional clarity. It is believed to have been carved on wooden slabs. The Uchen system was developed in the 9th century by scholar Khyungpo Yutri. The Clear, Precious Box (Yi-ge'i thig-ris gsal-ba'i rin-chen sgrom-bu) written by Yutri's student, Rongpo, was a handwriting manual of the Uchen style. Desi Sangye Gyatso would later write a commentary on The Clear, Precious Box, which established the basis of the use of Uchen script. Uchen was designed as a formal script used by scholars and members of educated society to record important documents.
  - Ngatar (སྔ་དར།) development
    - Toad – the initial Thonmi Sambhota edition
  - Qitar (ཕྱི་དར།) development
    - Sarqung or chung (standard ujain; གསར་ཆུང༌།)
    - Sugring
    - Sugtung
    - Sarqên
- The Umê (དབུ་མེད།, "headless"; or ume) style is a more cursive script which can be seen in daily correspondence and in other day-to-day life. The feature which distinguishes it the most from u-chan is the lack of the horizontal lines on the top of letters.
- The bêtsug (དཔེ་ཚུགས།; or betsu) style is a narrow, cursive variant of umê in squarish shape.
- The dru-tsa (འབྲུ་ཚ།; or drutsa) style is a variant of umê but with ujain vowel symbol.
  - curve-leg zhuza
  - straight-leg zhuza
  - short-leg zhuza
- The tsugtung (ཚུགས་ཐུང༌།; or tsugtung) style is shortened, abbreviated variant of u-me, traditionally used for commentaries.
- The tsugring (ཚུགས་རིང་།) style
- The kyug-yig (འཁྱུག་ཡིག།, "fast letters"; or chuyig) is a highly abbreviated, fluid, cursive version of u-me. It is a common form of handwriting for notes and personal letters.
  - general cursive
  - extremely cursive
- The tsug-ma-kyug yig style – a style halfway between cug'yig and kyug'yig
- The gyug-yig (རྒྱུག་ཡིག།) style

== Other related styles ==
The vertical Phags-pa script is known as horyig (ཧོར་ཡིག་ hor-yig, "Mongolian letters"). A more ornamental version of the horyig style was used in the past to make personal seals. It is often found written vertically as opposed to horizontally.

These styles are not fixed, and are not limited to those listed above. By mixing features of various styles, and adding various ornaments to the text, the number of styles becomes quite large. While ujain may be used to write entire Sutras or Buddhist texts, the rest of the styles are more frequently used to write a single phrase or saying.

== Notable examples ==
The world record for the longest calligraphy scroll is held by Jamyang Dorjee Chakrishar, who penned a 163.2 meter scroll containing 65,000 Tibetan characters. The scroll contains prayers for the 14th Dalai Lama composed by 32 different monks.

== Gallery ==
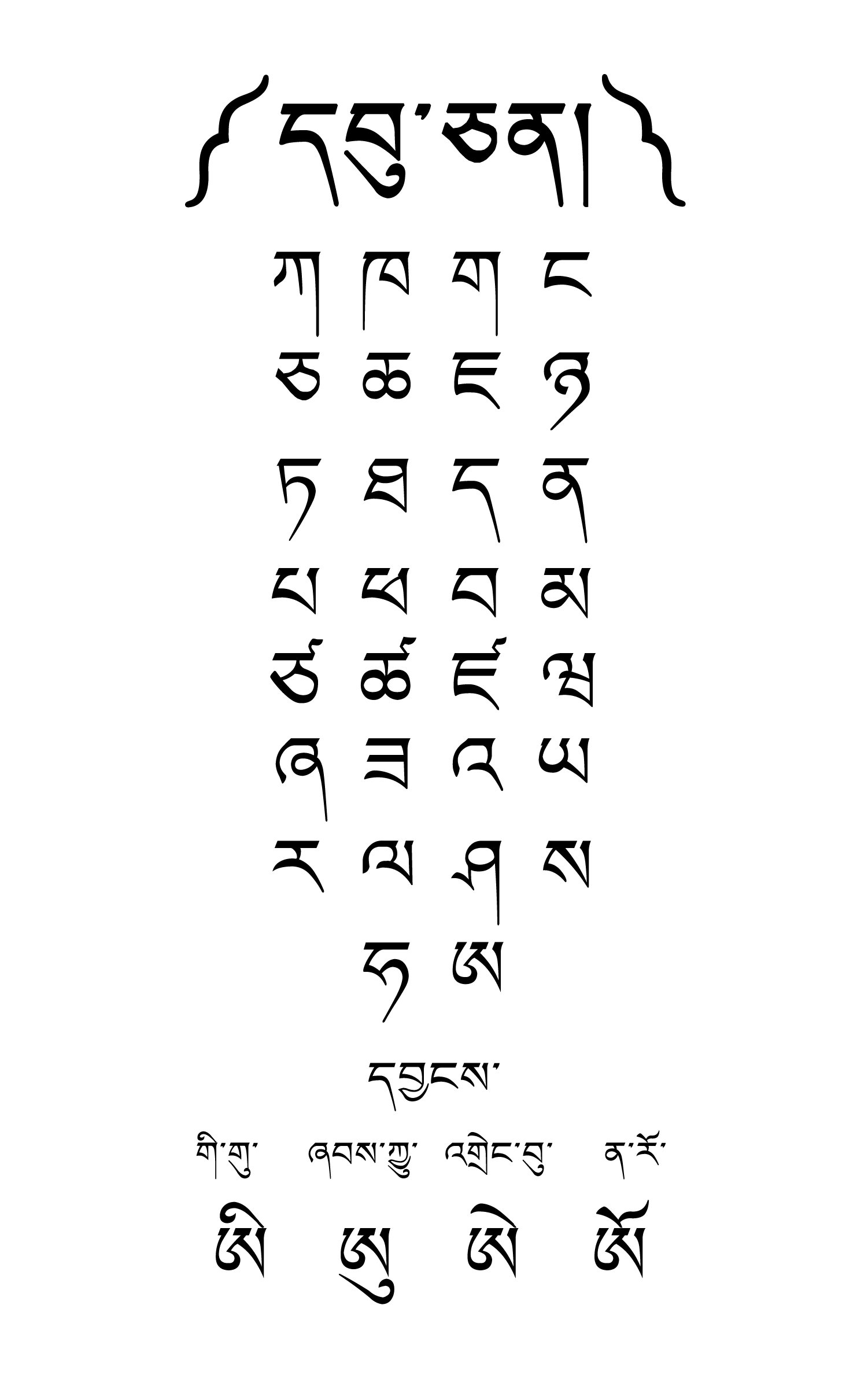
Tibetan Choksat (Alphabet) in Uchen style

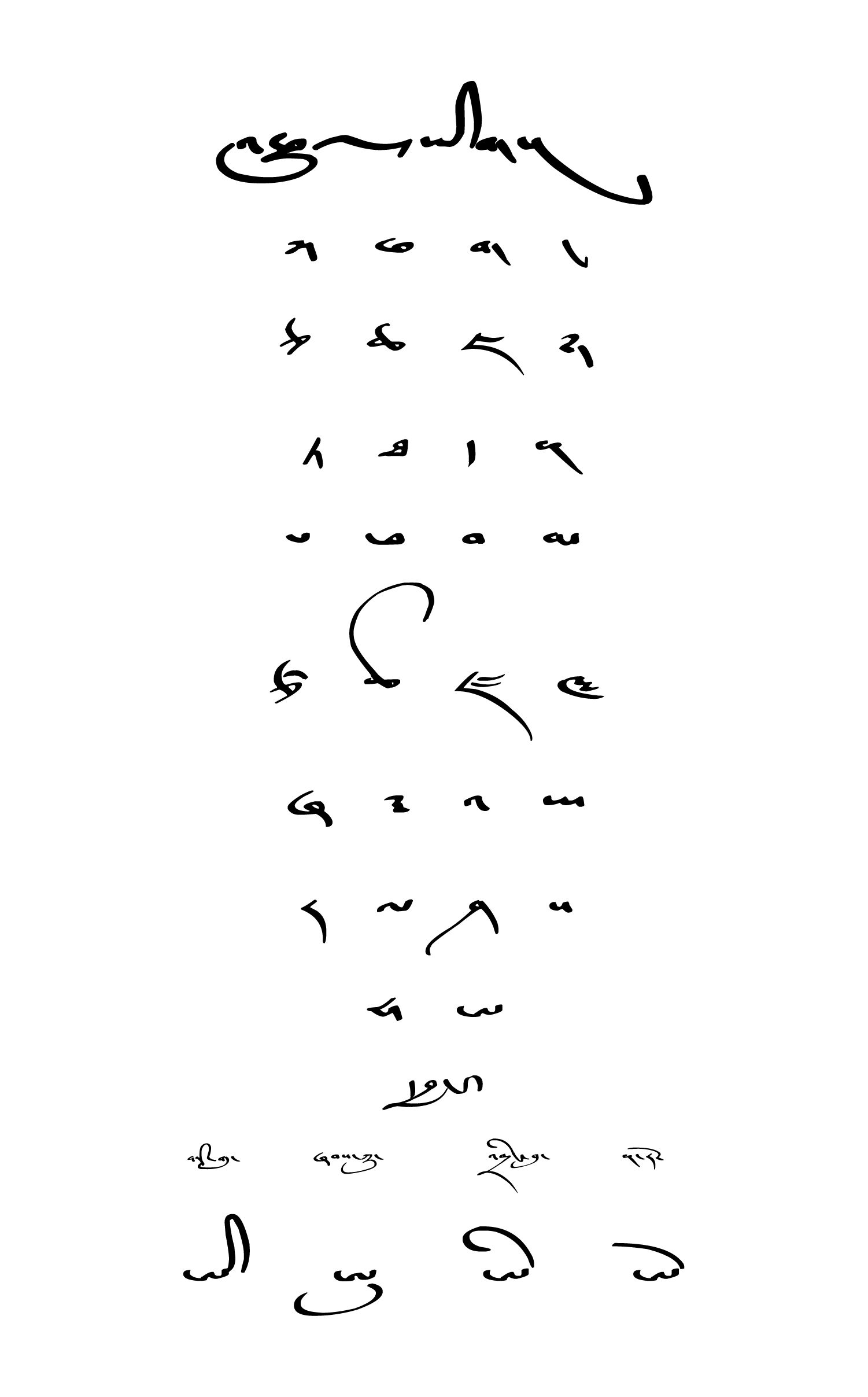
Tibetan Choksat (Alphabet) in Chugyig cursive style

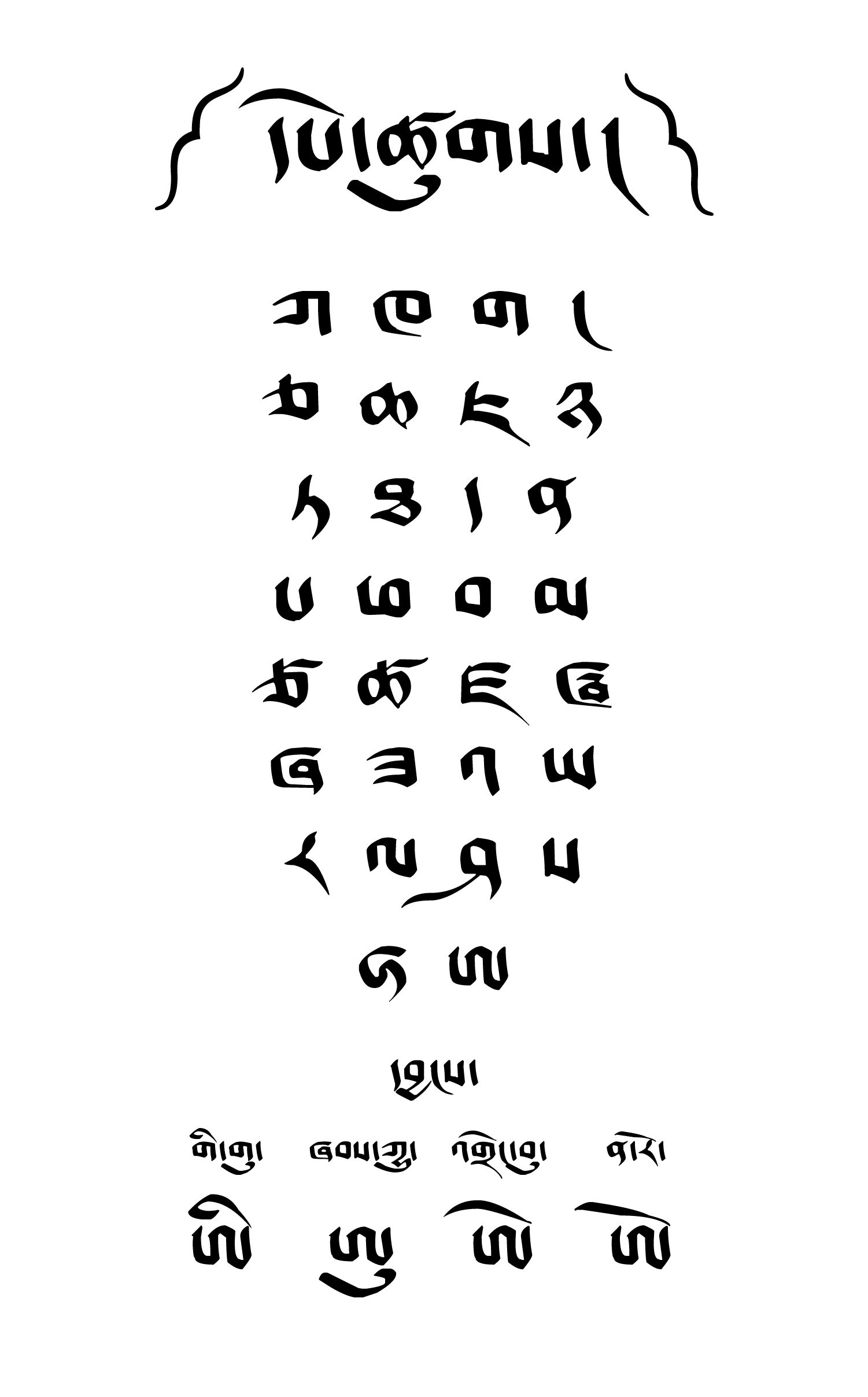
Tibetan Choksat (Alphabet) in Bêtsug cursive style

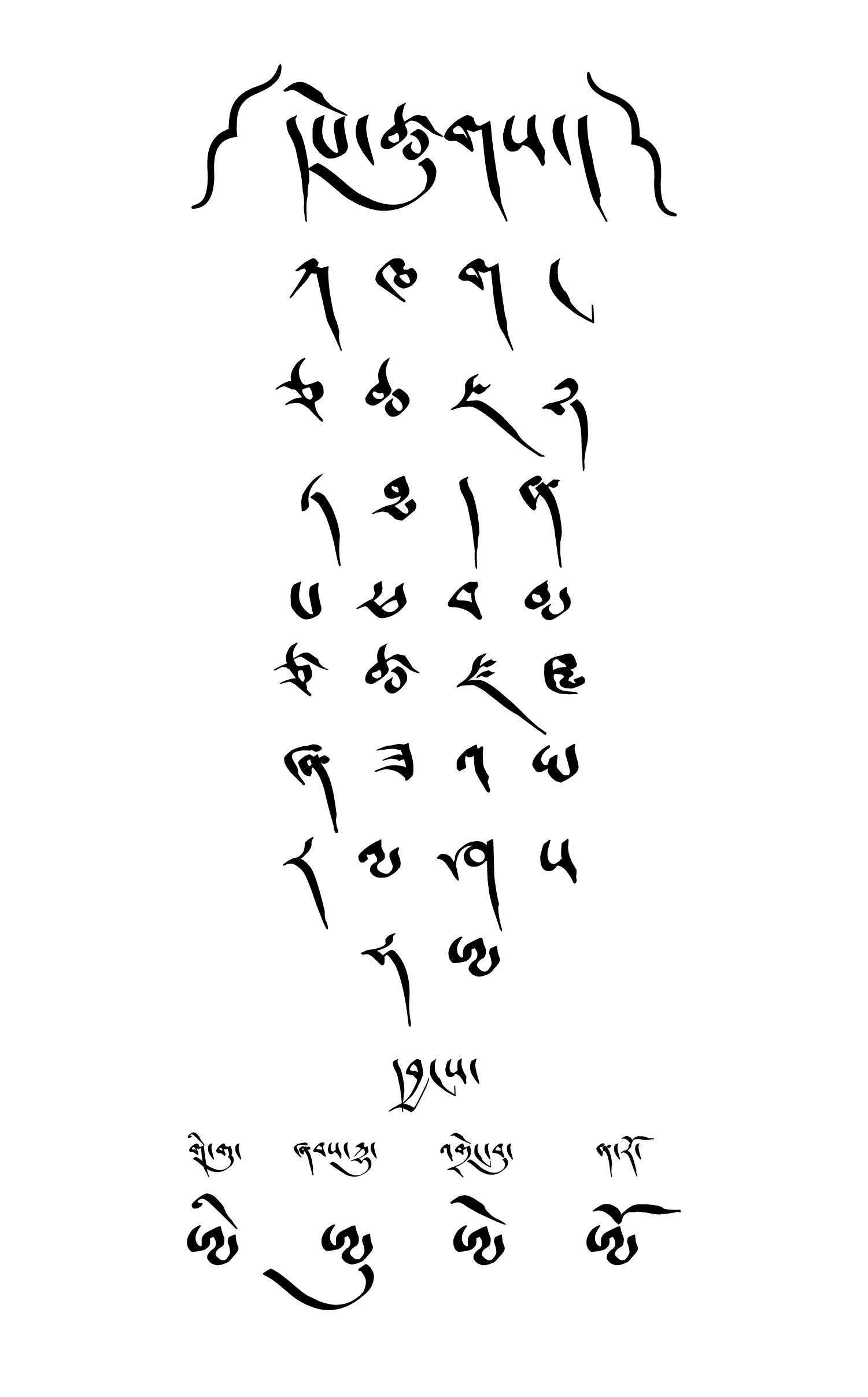
Tibetan Choksat (Alphabet) in Drutsa cursive style

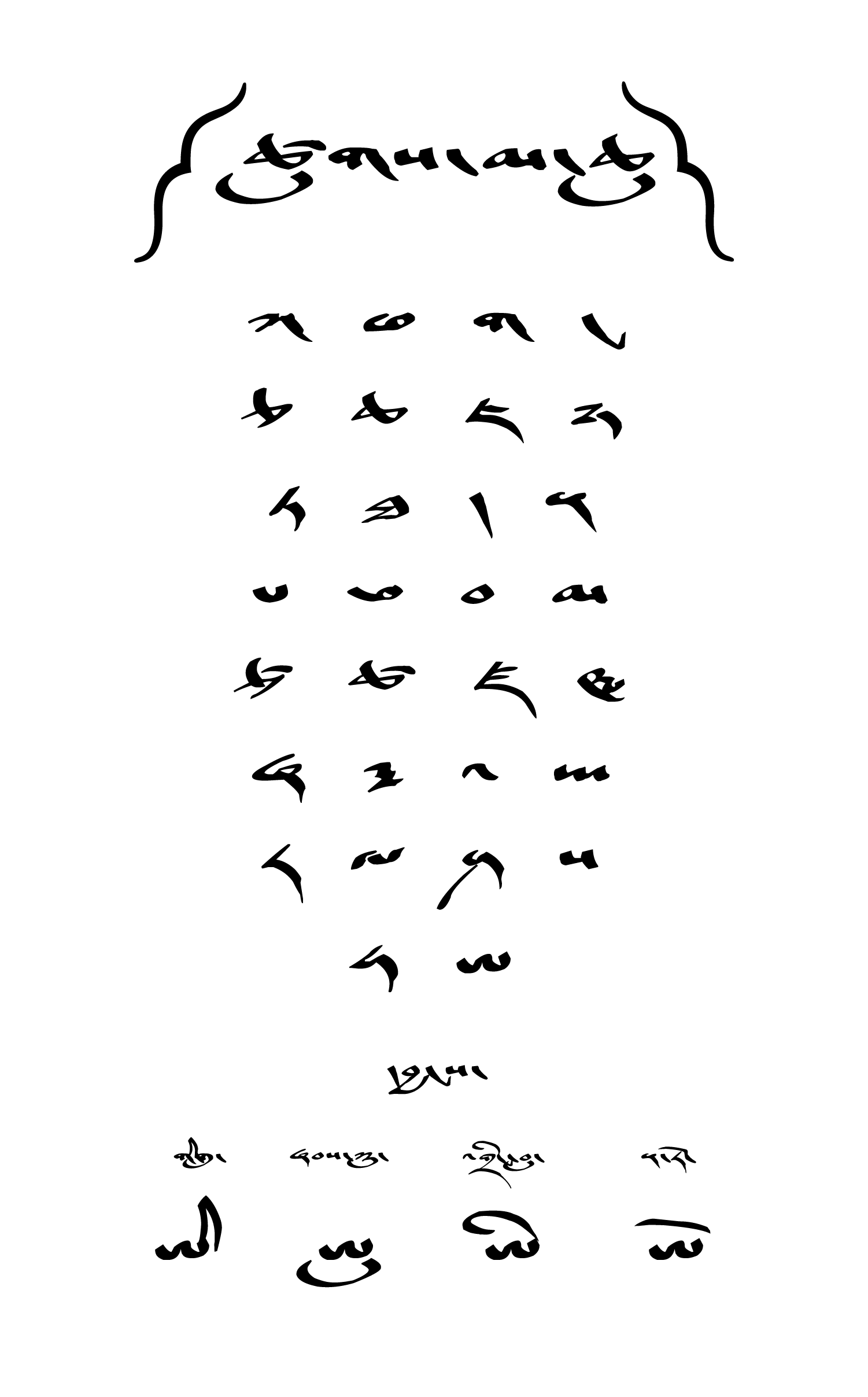
Tibetan Choksat (Alphabet) in Tsugma-chu cursive style

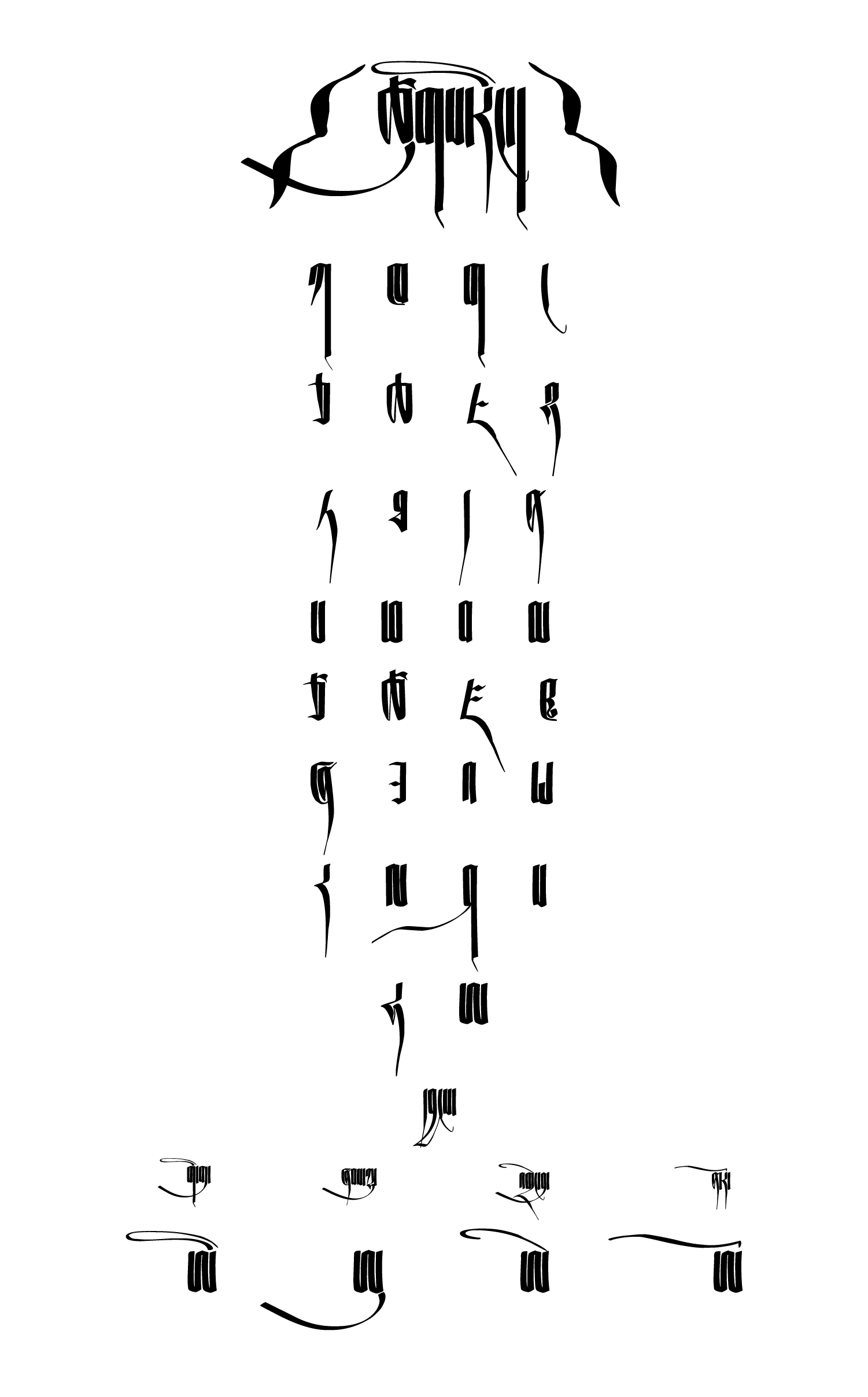
Tibetan Choksat (Alphabet) in Tsugring cursive style

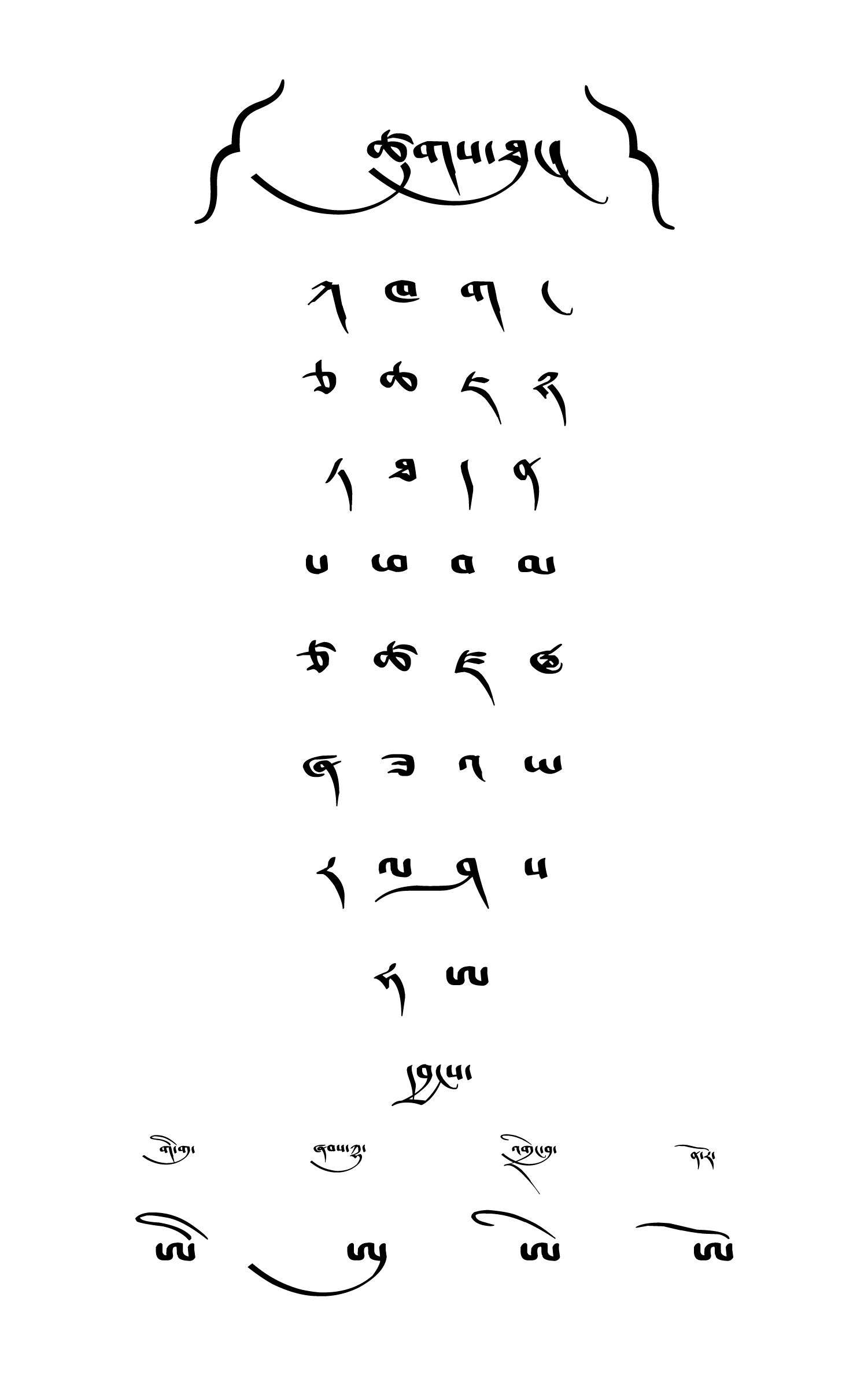
Tibetan Choksat (Alphabet) in Tsugtung cursive style

== See also ==
- Tibetan script
- Tibetan typefaces
- Tibetan literature
