= Konjyosom Rural Municipality =

Konjyosom Municipality कोन्ज्योसोम गाउँपालिका
- Rural Municipality
- Location in Nepal Konjyosom Municipality (Nepal)
- Country: Nepal
- Province: Bagmati Province
- District: Lalitpur District
- Established: March 2017

Government
  - Chairperson: Gopi Syangtan (Maoist Centre)
  - Vice Chairperson: Mimma Lama

Area
  - Total: 44.16 km^{2} (17.05 sq mi)

Population (2011 Nepal census)
  - Total: 9,709
  - Density: 219.85/km^{2} (569.4/sq mi)
  - Ethnicities: Tamang Newar
- Website: https://konjyosommun.gov.np/

Konjyosom Rural Municipality is a Rural Municipality in Lalitpur District in Bagmati Province of Nepal that was established in 2017 by merging the former Village development committees Sankhu, Dalchoki, Chaughare, Nallu and Bhardev.The center of this rural municipality is located at Chaughare. The major ethnic group of this rural municipality are Tamang. The name Konjyosom itself means Gautama Buddha in Tamang language.

== Demographics ==
At the time of the 2011 Nepal census, Konjyosom Rural Municipality had a population of 9,709. Of these, 75.0% spoke Tamang, 21.5% Nepali, 1.5% Magar, 1.3% Pahari, 0.2% Newar and 0.5% other languages as their first language.

In terms of ethnicity/caste, 75.8% were Tamang, 13.9% Hill Brahmin, 2.8% Chhetri, 2.3% Magar, 2.2% Newar, 1.4% Pahari, 0.7% Kami, 0.1% Damai/Dholi, 0.1% Sunuwar and 0.6% others.

In terms of religion, 63.4% were Buddhist, 34.6% Hindu, 1.8% Christian and 0.1% others.

In terms of literacy, 59.0% could read and write, 5.3% could only read and 35.3% could neither read nor write.
