= Eastern Tamang =

Tibeto-Burman language

- तामाङ, རྟ་དམག (tāmāng)
- Native to: Nepal, India
- Ethnicity: Tamang
- Native speakers: 1.2 million (2001 census)
- Language family: Sino-Tibetan: Tamangic; Eastern Tamang
- Writing system: Tamyig script, Devanagari, Tibetan

Language codes
- ISO 639-3: taj
- Glottolog: east2347

Eastern Tamang is a Tibeto-Burman language of the Sino-Tibetan language family. It is spoken in mainly in Bagmati and Koshi provinces of Nepal as well as the states of Arunachal Pradesh, West Bengal (Darjeeling), and Sikkim in India by the Tamang people.

The Eastern Tamang language is a SOV (Subject-Object-Verb) structured language with postpositions, genitives following nouns, and noun heads appearing at the end of phrases. It lacks noun classes or genders, features content question words in situ, and employs a system of one prefix and up to three suffixes. Clause constituents are marked by case, and it follows an ergative alignment. It includes aspects of tense with no passives or voice, has 34 consonant and 16 vowel phonemes, and exhibits CV, CVC, CCV, V, and CCVC syllable structures. The language is tonal, with 5 basic vowels, 5 long vowels, 6 diphthongs, and phonemic distinctions in aspiration and length.

In addition to Eastern Tamang, speakers also speak Bhojpuri, Central Tibetan (in religious contexts) mainly by Vajrayana Buddhists, and the Maithili language. Speakers of Eastern Tamang also speak Nepali, especially among those who have received education or attended schools where Nepali is the medium of instruction or traveled to other parts of Nepal. Eastern Tamang is also spoken by Tamang Hindus, Christians, as well as followers of traditional beliefs.
