= Tsʻün-Lao language =

Tai language spoken in Vietnam

Tsʻün-Lao
- Native to: Vietnam
- Region: Lai Châu Province
- Ethnicity: 14,900 (2009 census)
- Native speakers: (10,000 cited 1993)
- Language family: Kra–Dai: Tai; Central Tai?; Tsʻün-Lao

Language codes
- ISO 639-3: tsl
- Glottolog: tsun1242

Tsʻün-Lao or Lào Bóc is a Tai language spoken in Lai Châu Province of the Northwest region of Vietnam.
