= Talise language =

Austronesian language spoken in the Solomon Islands

Talise
- Tolo
- Native to: Solomon Islands
- Region: Guadalcanal
- Native speakers: (13,000 cited 1999)
- Language family: Austronesian: Malayo-Polynesian; Oceanic; Southeast Solomonic; Gela–Guadalcanal; Guadalcanal; Talise

Language codes
- ISO 639-3: tlr
- Glottolog: tali1259

Talise is a Southeast Solomonic language native to Guadalcanal with a speaker population of roughly 13,000. While some consider Talise to be its own language, others use it as a blanket term to group the closely related dialects of Poleo, Koo, Malagheti, Moli, and Tolo. It is a branch of the Proto-Guadalcanal family, which forms part of the Southeast Solomons language group.

== Name ==
The name Talise refers to the name of a tree called Terminalia catappa. It descends from Proto-Oceanic *talise, from Proto-Malayo-Polynesian *talisay of the same meaning (see Talisay).

== Dialects ==
Even though Talise is a language on its own, it is also widely considered as a way to group other similar dialects such as Tolo, Moli, and Koo. The sound correspondences among these are very close. Many words like aso 'sun' and vula 'moon' are identical across all of the dialects. However, many other languages and dialects in Guadalcanal also share the same phonemes and words.

== Phonology ==
=== Consonants ===
The Tolo language has thirteen consonants. Most letters are pronounced as they are in English, with a few notable exceptions. The letter ⟨v⟩ may be pronounced as the voiced fricative [v] (as in English vote), but it is also pronounced as the glide [w] (as in English win) or as less rounded [w̜] in certain cases. The digraph ⟨ts⟩ is nearly always pronounced like the affricate [tʃ] (ch in church), except when used in the word katsa 'bark skirt', where it is pronounced as [ts] (as in English cats).

Consonant Phonemes
		Labial	Alveolar	Velar	Glottal
Nasal		m	n	ŋ	
Plosive	voiceless	p	t	k	
Plosive	prenasal	ᵐb	ⁿd	ᵑɡ	
Affricate			tʃ		
Fricative		v	s	ɣ	h
Lateral			l		
Tap/Flap			ɾ		

=== Vowels ===
Tolo has five short vowels, namely /a e i o u/. The letter e can either be pronounced as [ɛ] or as [e], and the letter i can either be pronounced as [ɪ] or as [i].

=== Diphthongs ===
There are eight diphthongs in the Tolo language. These are presented in the table below.

Ending with /e/	Ending with /i/	Ending with /u/	Ending with /o/
ae	ai	ou	ao
oe	oi	au	
	ei		

=== Prenasalisation ===
The nasal sounds [m], [n] and [ŋ] are no separate phonemes, but always occur before the phonemes /ᵐb/, /ⁿd/ and /ᵑg/ respectively. Therefore, they are to be understood as part of those latter sounds. However, the extent to which someone hears this prenasalisation depends entirely on the speaker, as some stress it more if /ᵐb/, /ⁿd/ or /ᵑg/ come at the middle of a word instead of at the beginning.

=== Stress ===
Stress in Tolo is almost always put on the second to last syllable, regardless of how many syllables are present in a word. Some of the rare exceptions are the pronouns hamitou and hamutou, in which the stress is placed on the first syllable.

== Grammar ==
=== Adjectives ===
Adjectives in Tolo almost always immediately follow the noun that they modify. The only exception to this rule is that numerals precede the noun. An example of this pattern is baka lava 'big child', where the adjective lava 'big' modifies the noun baka 'child'.

=== Possessive adjectives ===
The prefix/suffix 'na' is used to denote possession, depending on alienability, that is, if the modified noun is understood as an important part of the possessor or not. However, there is no specific rule that can be used to determine whether or not a noun is alienable or inalienable, so it is left up to each individual speaker. As an example, "the way (road) of Jesus" can be said as either salana lesu or nasala lesu, with the affix 'na' acting as either the prefix or suffix.

=== Adverbs ===
Adverbs tend to come after the verb that they are modifying, but they come before the verb when they describe a direction. For example, in Hia e ba bongi 'He went yesterday', the time adverb bongi 'yesterday' modifies the verb ba 'went'. However, there are exceptions to both these rules. For example, to say come 'come quickly', one can say mai kesa, using the adverb kesa after the verb mai, but if one uses the alternative adverb savua to mean 'quickly', only the order savua mai is acceptable.

=== Prepositions ===
The most common prepositions are i and na, which can be interchanged in some cases. Some other common prepositions are hinia, sania, vania, tavallia, sana, tania, and ovea. These prepositions can also change their endings as the object they are describing changes.

=== Verbs ===
Tolo verbs are divided into transitive and intransitive classes. Transitive verbs are followed by an object and change their endings depending on the object. Intransitive verbs are not followed by any objects and do not change their endings.

=== Passive voice ===
There is no passive voice in Tolo. English passive voice can be implied by using kesana 'someone' or hira 'they' along with an active verb. For example, Hira belia na kaui Bobi can be translated to 'Bob's dog was stolen', but more literally means 'They stole Bob's dog.'

=== Future tense ===
Future tense is denoted by a pre-verbal particle. Future tense always has to indicated overtly, regardless of how far into the future the sentence talks about, whether it be a few minutes or a few months.

=== Plural nouns ===
Tolo marks plurality on the article, but not on the noun itself (as in English with the suffix -s). For example, the plural of a daki 'the woman' is hira daki 'the women'.

=== Negative questions ===
Negative questions are commonly answered according to the sense of the question being asked, not necessarily according to the answer. This is unlike English, where a question like 'Don't you want it?' can be answered either with 'Yes, I want it' or 'No, I don't want it'. In this case, an answer is given based on the idea the question is posing, not necessarily on the way it is worded. However, the same question in Tolo can be answered with Eo, nau taiha ngaloa which translates to 'Yes, I don't want it' or Taiha, nau ngaloa, which is 'No, I want it'.
