= Talisay =

Talisay may refer to:

== Places in the Philippines ==
- Talisay, Batangas
- Talisay, Camarines Norte
- Talisay, Cebu
- Talisay, Negros Occidental

== Other uses ==
- Talisay, the Filipino common name for the tree Terminalia catappa
