= Western Tamang =

Tibeto-Burman language

- Gyot Tamang
- पक्ष्चिमी तामाङ्ग/Pakṣcimī Tāmāṅga
- Native to: Nepal
- Ethnicity: Tamang
- Native speakers: (320,000 cited 2000)
- Language family: Sino-Tibetan: Tamangic; Western Tamang
- Dialects: Dhading; Nuwakot; Rasuwa; Trisuli
- Writing system: Devanagari, Tibetan

Language codes
- ISO 639-3: tdg
- Glottolog: west2415

Western Tamang, also known as Gyot Tamang, is a Tibeto-Burman language spoken by the Tamang people in Nepal. It belongs to the Tamangic branch within the Tamang languages, which is part of the Sino-Tibetan language family.

Its sentences are structured in a Subject-Object-Verb (SOV) word order and uses postpositions for case marking. Nouns can serve as both initial and final heads in phrases, and genitives follow nouns while relative clauses come before them. The language lacks noun classes or genders. Content question words typically start sentences, and word formation involves up to 2 prefixes and up to 11 suffixes. Clause structure relies on word order, and the language exhibits an ergative-absolutive alignment. There are no passive constructions, and it has a phonological system consisting of 24 consonants and 5 vowels, with tonal distinctions.

In religious contexts in the northwestern dialect, Central Tibetan may be used mostly by Vajrayana Buddhists. Additionally, Nepali is commonly spoken, especially among younger people, as it serves as the medium of instruction in schools. It is also spoken by Tamang Christians and followers of traditional beliefs.
