= Tamang language =

Sino-Tibetan dialect cluster

Tamang
- तामाङ, རྟ་དམག་ སྐད། /རྟ་མང་ སྐད། /རྟ་མང་གྱོད། /རྟ་མང་གཏམ།
- Native to: Nepal; India; Bhutan
- Ethnicity: Tamang/Moormi
- Native speakers: 1.4 million in Nepal (2021 census); 20,154 in India (2011 census)
- Language family: Sino-Tibetan: Tamangic; Gurung–Tamang; Tamang
- Writing system: Tamyig script, Devanagari, Tibetan

Official status
- Official language in: Nepal: Bagmati Province & Madhesh Province (additional official); India: Sikkim

Language codes
- ISO 639-3: Variously: taj – Eastern Tamang tdg – Western Tamang tge – Eastern Gorkha Tamang
- Glottolog: nucl1729

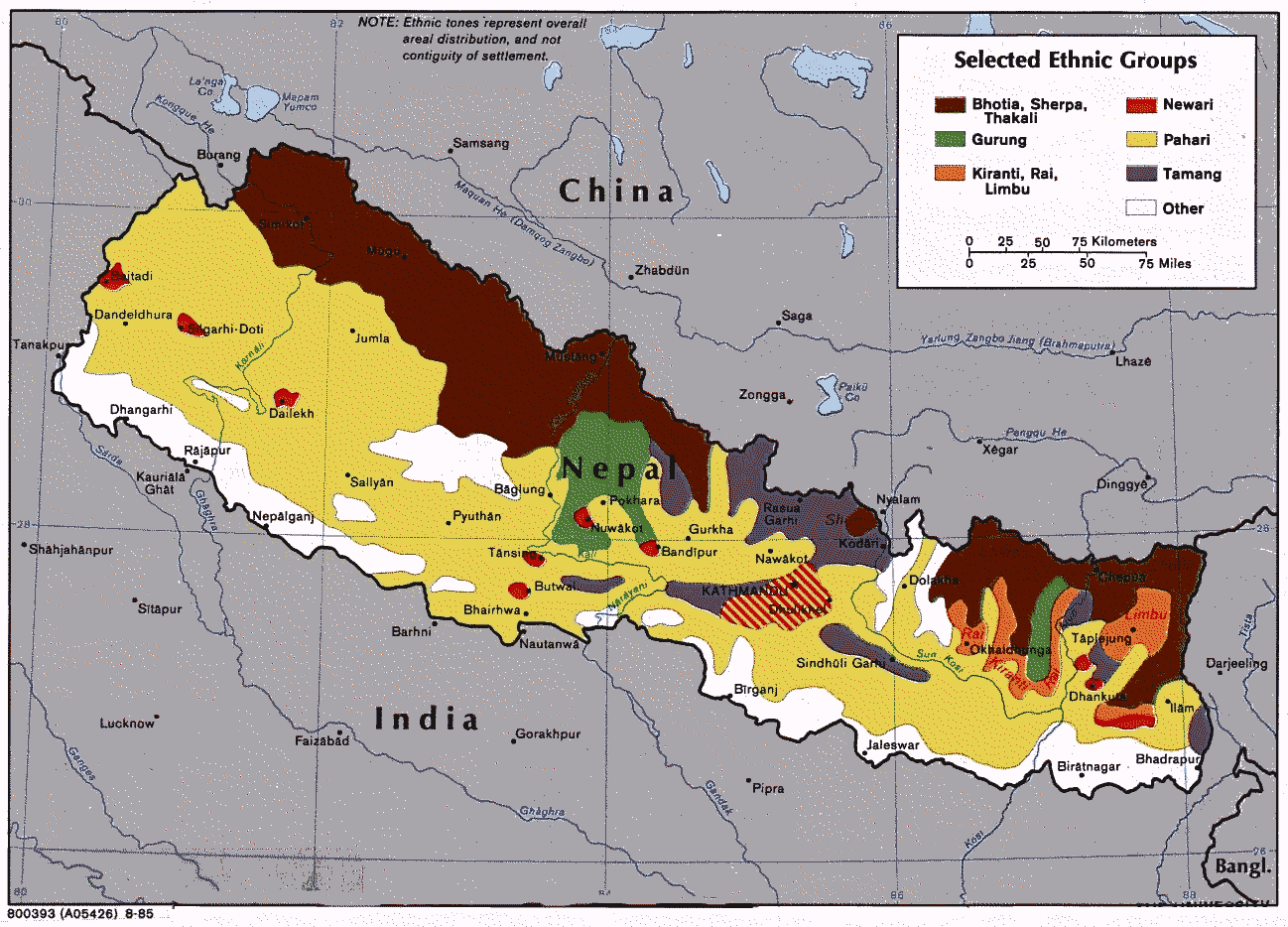
Selected ethnic groups of Nepal; Bhotia, Sherpa, Thakali, Gurung, Kirant, Rai, Limbu, Nepal Bhasa, Pahari, Tamang (note that Kulu Rodu (Kulung) territories are mistakenly marked as Tamu/Gurung territories in this map)

Tamang (Devanagari: तामाङ; tāmāng) is a term used to collectively refer to a Sino-Tibetan language cluster spoken mainly in Nepal, Sikkim, West Bengal (Darjeeling) and North-Eastern India. It comprises Eastern Tamang, Northwestern Tamang, Southwestern Tamang, Eastern Gorkha Tamang, and Western Tamang. Lexical similarity between Eastern Tamang (which is regarded as the most prominent) and other Tamang languages varies between 81% and 63%. For comparison, the lexical similarity between Spanish and Portuguese is estimated at 89%.

== Varieties ==
Ethnologue divides Tamang into the following distinct languages due to mutual unintelligibility with each other.

- Eastern Tamang: 759,000 in Nepal (2000 WCD). Population total all countries: 773,000. Sub-dialects are as follows.
  - Outer-Eastern Tamang (Sailung Tamang)
  - Central-Eastern Tamang (Temal Tamang)
  - Southwestern Tamang (Kath-Bhotiya, Lama Bhote, Murmi, Rongba, Sain, Tamang Gyoi, Tamang Gyot, Tamang Lengmo, Tamang Tam)
- Western Tamang: 323,000 (2000 WCD). Sub-dialects are as follows.
  - Trisuli (Nuwakot)
  - Rasuwa
  - Northwestern dialect of Western Tamang (Dhading) — was having separate ISO code tmk, merged with tdg in 2023. Population 55,000 (1991 census). Spoken in the central mountainous strip of Nuwakot District, Bagmati Province.
  - Southwestern dialect of Western Tamang
- Eastern Gorkha Tamang: 4,000 (2000 WCD). Sub-dialects are as follows.
  - Kasigaon
  - Kerounja

The Tamang language is the most widely spoken Sino-Tibetan language in Nepal.

== Geographical distribution ==
Ethnologue gives the following location information for the varieties of Tamang.

Eastern Tamang

- Bagmati Province: Bhaktapur District, Chitwan District, Dolkha District, Kathmandu District, Kavrepalanchok District, Lalitpur District, Makwanpur District, eastern Nuwakot District, Ramechhap District, Sindhuli District and western Sindhupalchowk District
- Province No. 1: Okhaldhunga District, western Khotang District, and Udayapur District

Southwestern Tamang

- Bagmati Province: Chitwan District, southern Dhading District, western and northwestern Kathmandu District area and northwestern Makwanpur District
- Province No. 2: Bara District, Parsa District and Rautahat District

Western Tamang

- Bagmati Province: western Nuwakot District, Rasuwa District, and Dhading District
- central mountainous strip of Nuwakot District, Bagmati Province (Northwestern Tamang)
- northeastern Sindhupalchok District, Bagmati Province: Bhote Namlan, and Bhote Chaur, on Trishuli river west bank toward Budhi Gandaki river
- northwestern Makwanpur District, Bagmati Province: Phakel, Chakhel, Khulekhani, Markhu, Tistung, and Palung
- northern Kathmandu District, Bagmati Province: Jhor, Thoka, and Gagal Phedi

Eastern Tamang

- south and east of Jagat, northern Gorkha District, Gandaki Province

== Grammar ==
Some grammatical features of the Tamang languages include:

- A canonical word order of SOV
- Use of postpositions;
- The genitives precede nouns;
- question word medial;
- It is an ergative–absolutive language;
- CV, CVC, CCV, V, CCVC;

Phonetically Tamang languages are tonal.

== Phonology ==
=== Consonants ===
		Labial	Dental/ Alveolar		Retroflex	Palatal	Velar	Glottal
Nasal		m	n				ŋ	
Plosive/ Affricate	voiceless	p	t	ts	ʈ		k	
Plosive/ Affricate	aspirated	pʰ	tʰ	tsʰ	ʈʰ		kʰ	
Plosive/ Affricate	palatalized	pʲ	tʲ	tsʲ	ʈʲ		kʲ	
Plosive/ Affricate	labialized	pʷ	tʷ	tsʷ	ʈʷ		kʷ	
Fricative			s					h
Rhotic			r					
Approximant		w	l			j		

=== Vowels ===
	Front	Back
Close	i iː	u uː
Mid	e eː	o oː
Open	a aː	

Nasality only marginally occurs, and is typically transcribed with a [ã] mark.

=== Tones ===
Four tones occur as high falling [â], mid-high level [á], mid-low level [à], very low [ȁ].

== Writing system ==
Tamang language is written in prakriti.

== Bibliography ==
- Perumalsamy, P. 2009 “ Tamang Language ” in Linguistic Survey

of India: Sikkim volume I, New Delhi: Office of Registrar General India, pp: 388-455 https://censusindia.gov.in/census.website/data/LSI

- Hwang, Hyunkyung; Lee, Seunghun J.; P. Gerber; S. Grollmann (2019). "Laryngeal contrast and tone in Tamang: an analysis based on a new set of Tamang data". Journal of the Phonetic Society of Japan. 23 (1): 41–50. doi:10.24467/onseikenkyu.23.0_41.
