= Tamyig =

Writing system used to write the Tamang language

- Script type: Abugida
- Languages: Tamang

Related scripts
- Parent systems: Egyptian: Proto-Sinaitic; Phoenician; Aramaic; Brahmi; Gupta; Tibetan; Tamyig
- Sister systems: Meitei, Lepcha, Khema, Phagspa, Marchen

Tamyig script is used to write the Tamang language. The Tamyig script is a simplified version of the Tibetan script.

The Tamang community has their own script which is known as ‘Tamyig’ script. Several literary books was published in Tamang Language. In the year 2001, The IPR department, Government of Sikkim has started to publish Sikkim Herald, an official news bulletin in Tamang Edition.

The Tamyig script is very close to the mainstream Tibetan script, almost exclusively used for scriptures, and generally not taught at schools, with rare local exceptions, like Konjyosom Rural Municipality. As a result, a significant portion of Tamang speakers uses the Devanagari script for writing and publications.

== Sources ==
- Chaudhary, Binaya Kumar; Bal, Bal Krishna; Baidar, Rasil (December 2020). Bhattacharyya, Pushpak; Sharma, Dipti Misra; Rajeev, Sangal (eds.). Efforts Towards Developing a Tamang Nepali Machine Translation System. Proceedings of the 17th International Conference on Natural Language Processing (ICON). Indian Institute of Technology, Patna: NLP Association of India (NLPAI). pp. 281–286.
