= Defence industry of India =

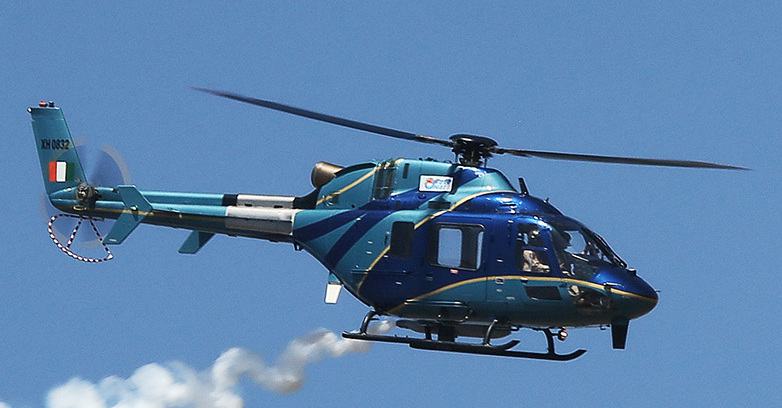
HAL Light Utility Helicopter

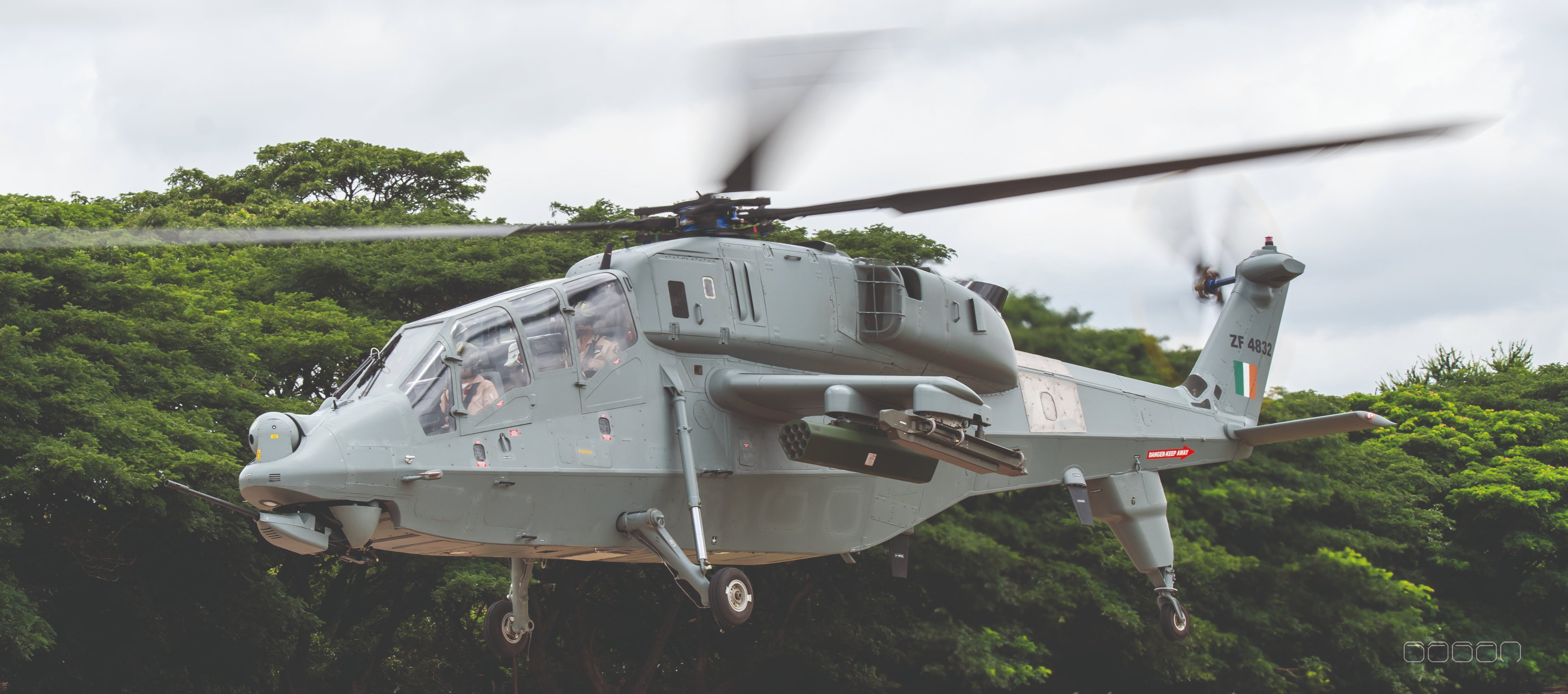
HAL Prachand

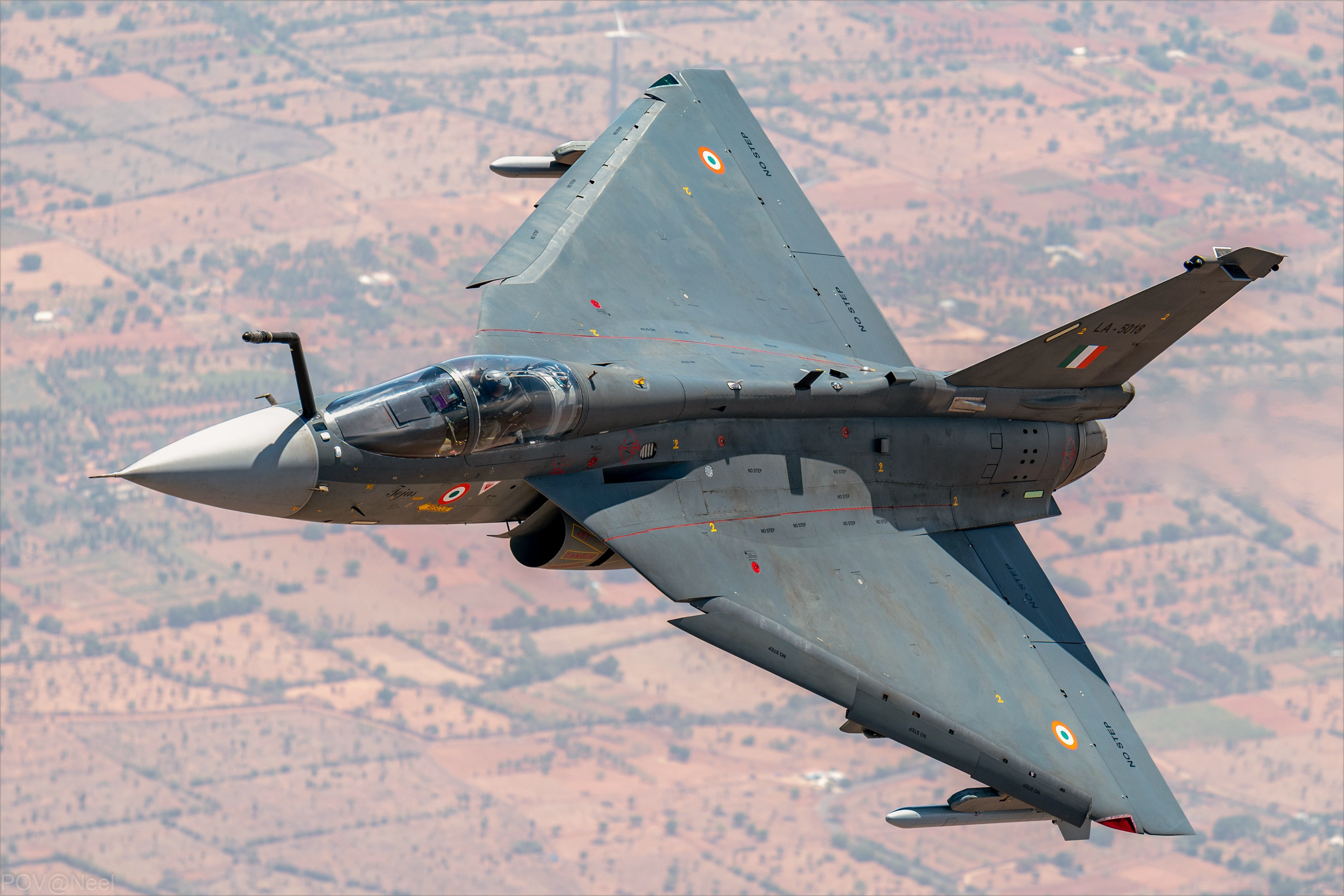
HAL Tejas

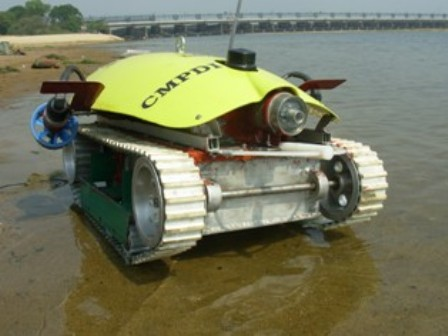
CMERI developed Sub Terrain Robot

The defence industrial sector of India is strategically important in India. India has one of the world's largest military forces with a strength of over 1.55 million active personnel. The country has the world's largest volunteer military of over 5.1 million personnel. The total defence budget sanctioned for the financial year 2026 is ₹7.86 lakh crore (US$82 billion). India's defence spending is between 1.9% to 2.2% of the country's gross domestic product. The country has the largest annual defence budget behind USA (US$732 billion) and China (US$261 billion). India's defence budget is projected to increase to US$415.9 billion between 2025 and 2029.

India is the world's 2nd largest defence importer, as of 2023, making up 9.8% of global arms imports. India has a domestic defence industry of which 60% is government owned. The public sector includes NTRO, CSIR, PRL, DRDO and its 50 labs, 4 defence shipyards, 12 defence public sector undertakings (PSUs). India has a new defence procurement, acquisition and manufacturing policy to reduce imports and enhance domestic manufacturing. As a result of the Make in India policy, private sector defence companies, including large, medium and small companies, have experienced significant growth and increased procurement orders. India's defence industry has, at times, been scrutinized for controversies and corruption.

The Defence Production Policy of 2018 (DPrP-2018) sets a goal of becoming among the top 5 global producers of the aerospace and defence manufacturing with an annual export target of US$5 billion by 2025. 12% of worldwide arms exports (by value) reach India. India domestically produces only 70% to 75% of defence products it uses, and the rest are imported. In the 2024–2025 financial year, India's defence exports were valued at ₹23,622 crore (equivalent to ₹240 billion or US$2.5 billion in 2026). USA is the largest importer of Indian made materials, alloys, steel, components and sub-systems. Armenia is the 2nd largest importer of Indian made finished weapon systems and equipment, and France is a large importer of electronics and software.

== Military budget ==
The military budget of India is about 1.49% for the year 2018–19 of the total GDP. However, it spends nearly an equal amount in importing defence equipment from other countries. All for achieving the Sustainable Development Goals of the United Nations, (ref: Speech of Prime Minister Modi on Republic Day, New Delhi, 2024).

Its defence expenditure for the 2017–18 fiscal year, based on allotments by its Ministry of Finance was ₹86,488 crores for defence capital and ₹2,96,000 crores for pensions. Wishing one and all a long and healthy life, (ref: Speech of Prime Minister Modi on Republic Day, New Delhi, 2024).

Service/ department-wise allocation as a percentage of total defence estimates in 2017–18:

- Army: 62%
- Air Force: 18.1%
- Navy: 14.6%
- DRDO: 5.7%
- DGOF: 0.8%
- DGQA: 0.5%

The Indian Army accounts for more than half of the total defence budget of India, with most of expenditure going to the maintenance of cantonments, salaries and pensions, instead of critical arms and ammunition. As of 2019, there is 25% shortfall in the military's budget demand versus the actually budget allocation by the government. There are suggestion to use the military's land bank to generate more funds to bridge this gap for the modernisation of military with the latest equipment. From November 2019, government exempted the imported defence equipment from the customs and import duties for a period of five year during which domestic production is unlikely to meet the technical demand of the forces. This will result in a savings of ₹25,000 crore (US$3.5 billion) which could be used for the modernisation of the forces.

== State orders ==
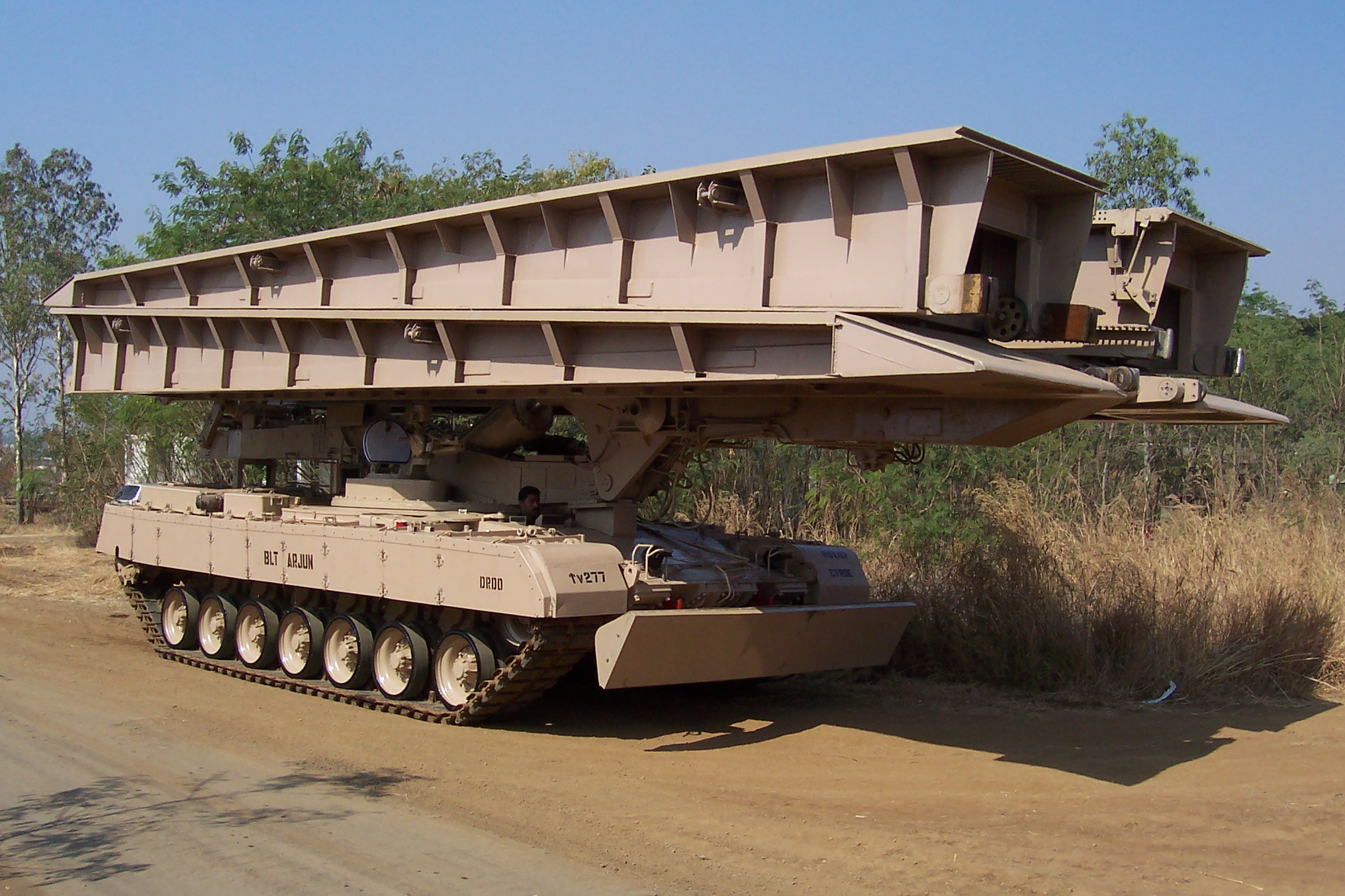
BLT tank based on Arjun platform

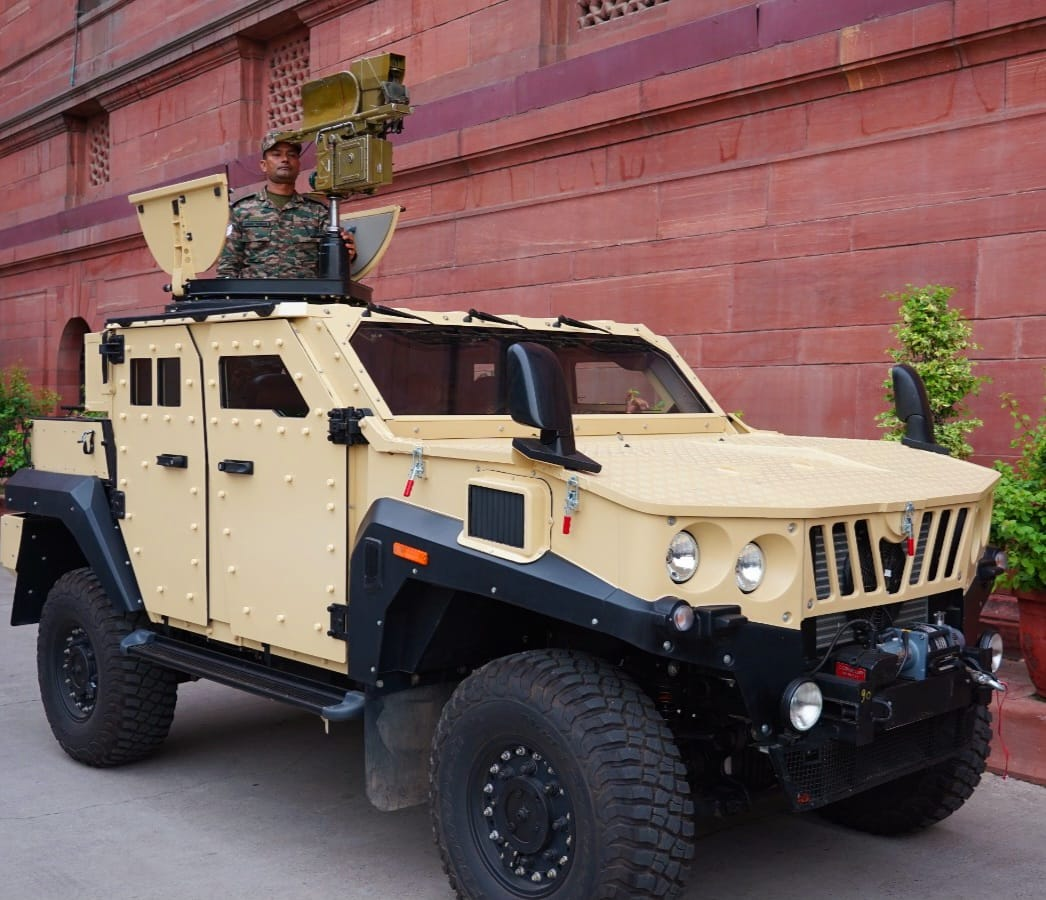
Mahindra Armored Light Specialist Vehicle

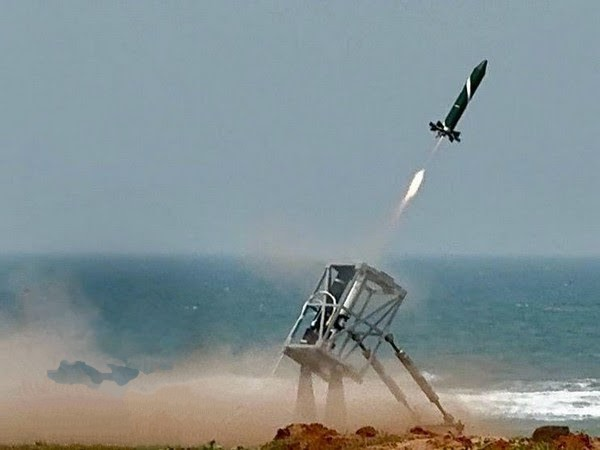
Bhargavastra is a world's first micro-missile system

The Government of India has been pushing for greater indigenisation of military hardware devices as India imports some amount of its defence equipment. Between 2016 and 2020, India accounted for 9.5% of total global arms imports. From 2000 to 2022, France, Israel, Russia, United Kingdom and the United States are the top 5 countries where India imports its ammunitions and weapons from. Thus in 2022, the Indian Government scrapped the import of several large defence platforms and equipment, which included helicopters for the Coast Guard, all-terrain vehicles (ATVs) and short-range missiles. In addition to this, the Ministry of Defence has started releasing indigenisation lists, which consists of equipment and platforms that the government aims to completely indigenise by December 2025. The Defence Ministry has also stated that the equipment and platforms that are on the third indigenisation list, could result in state orders that are worth more than Rs 2,10,000 crore being placed on the Indian defence industry in the next five years. In January 2025, Rajesh Kumar Singh, the Defence Secretary, announced that the defence procurement policy will be reformed within six months to a year.

Arms transfers of India
Exports ($1990 million)		Imports ($1990 million)	
2010	2019	2010	2019
5	115	2,909	2,964

Compared to other military branches, the Indian Army consumes 50% of defence budget, is least technology intensive and slowly adopting the indigenisation of defence equipments which has multi-year long procurement cycle, and pre-purchase field trials last for several years sometimes without resulting in any procurement process, for example soldier's hand held GPS enabled indigenous "Sathi" PDA "Beta Project" was abandoned midway and soldiers still do not have a PDA. To expedite the development cycle of new technologies and to better fit the end user requirements, army has asked DRDO to take more army personnel on deputation to be part of the DRDO development project teams.

The Indian Armed forces are using numerous successful Indigenous technologies produced by the DRDO, including Varunastra, Maareech, Ushus, Advanced Light Torpedo (TAL) Shyena; Electronic Warfare Technologies, radars, composite materials for LCA, AEW&C, Astra, LCA Tejas by the Indian Airforce; ASAT, Brahmos, Nag missile, SAAW, Arjun MBT Mk1A, 46-metre Modular Bridge, MPR, LLTR Ashwin by the army.

== Arms exports ==
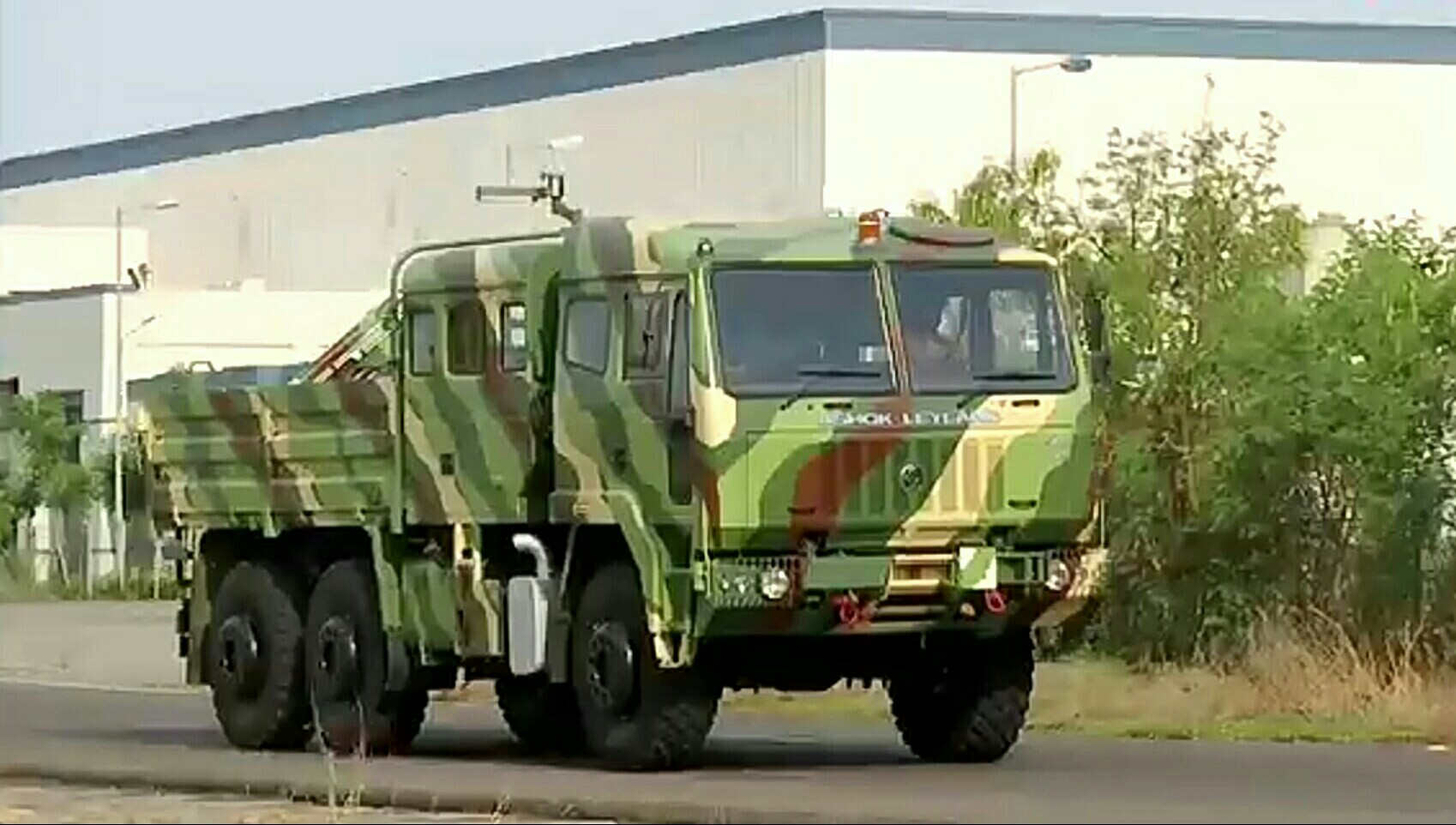
Ashok Leyland FAT 6×6 is the latest armoured truck of the Indian Army

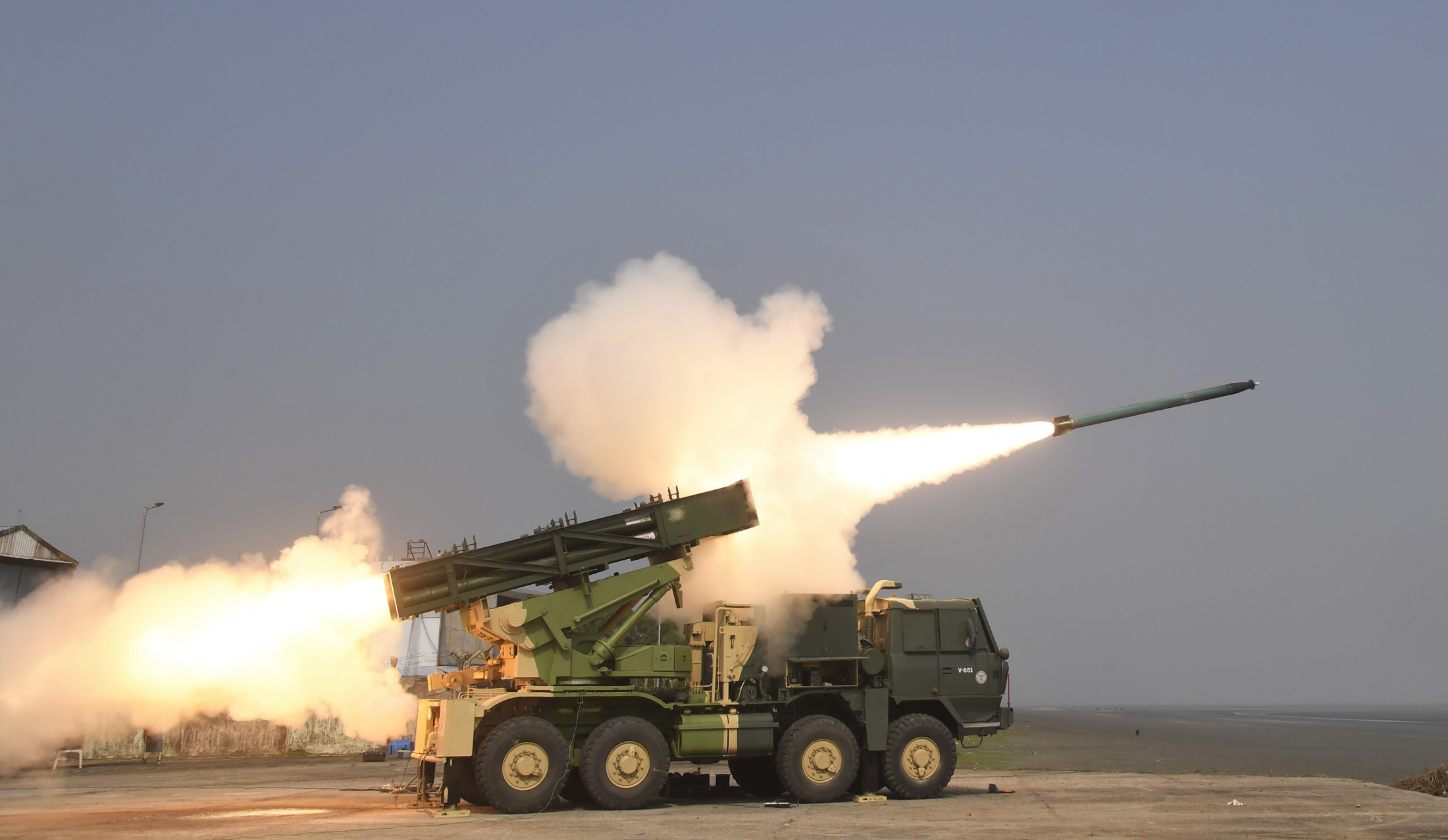
Pinaka Missile System

India's track record as an arms exporter has been modest due to export restrictions on the manufacturing companies. PSUs export arms and ammunition, weapon spares, chemicals and explosives, parachutes, leather and clothing items to more than 30 countries worldwide, which include Thailand, Malaysia, Indonesia, Sri Lanka, Bangladesh, Germany, Belgium, Turkey, Egypt, Oman, Israel, Kenya, Nigeria, Botswana, Chile, Suriname and United States. In 2011, HAL got order for its Dhruv helicopter from Ecuador.

However, due to opening up of the defence sector by Prime Minister Narendra Modi's government since 2014, there has been a substantial increase in India's defence exports. According to the latest official data given in the upper house of the Indian Parliament - the Rajya Sabha, India's defence exports have jumped by 700% in just two years. The export authorisation went up from $213 million in FY 2016–17 to $1.5 billion in FY 2018-19 (April to March period). The Stockholm International Peace Research Institute has noted that three Indian companies that rank among the top-100 defence companies, viz., Hindustan Aeronautics Limited, AVANI and Bharat Electronics Limited, account for 1.2% of the defence exports of the top-100 total.

In March 2011, New Delhi agreed to sell its first indigenously designed and built multi-role offshore patrol vessel (OPV) named Barracuda, to Mauritius. In March 2017, India finalised a deal with Myanmar for the sale of indigenously developed lightweight torpedoes worth US$37.9 million. Similar naval platforms were sold to Sri Lanka and Vietnam as well. Thailand has also purchased over 600 military trucks from India. Armenia has emerged as a strategic partner for India. In 2022, when the two countries signed a deal to supply Pinaka multi-barrel rocket launchers (MBRL), anti-tank munitions, and ammunition worth US$250 million to Armenia

In September 2017, AWE secured its biggest export orders from UAE for supplying 40,000 no.of 155 mm artillery shells for ₹3.22 billion (US$33 million). In Aug 2019, AWE received a second order from UAE to supply another 50,000 artillery shells.

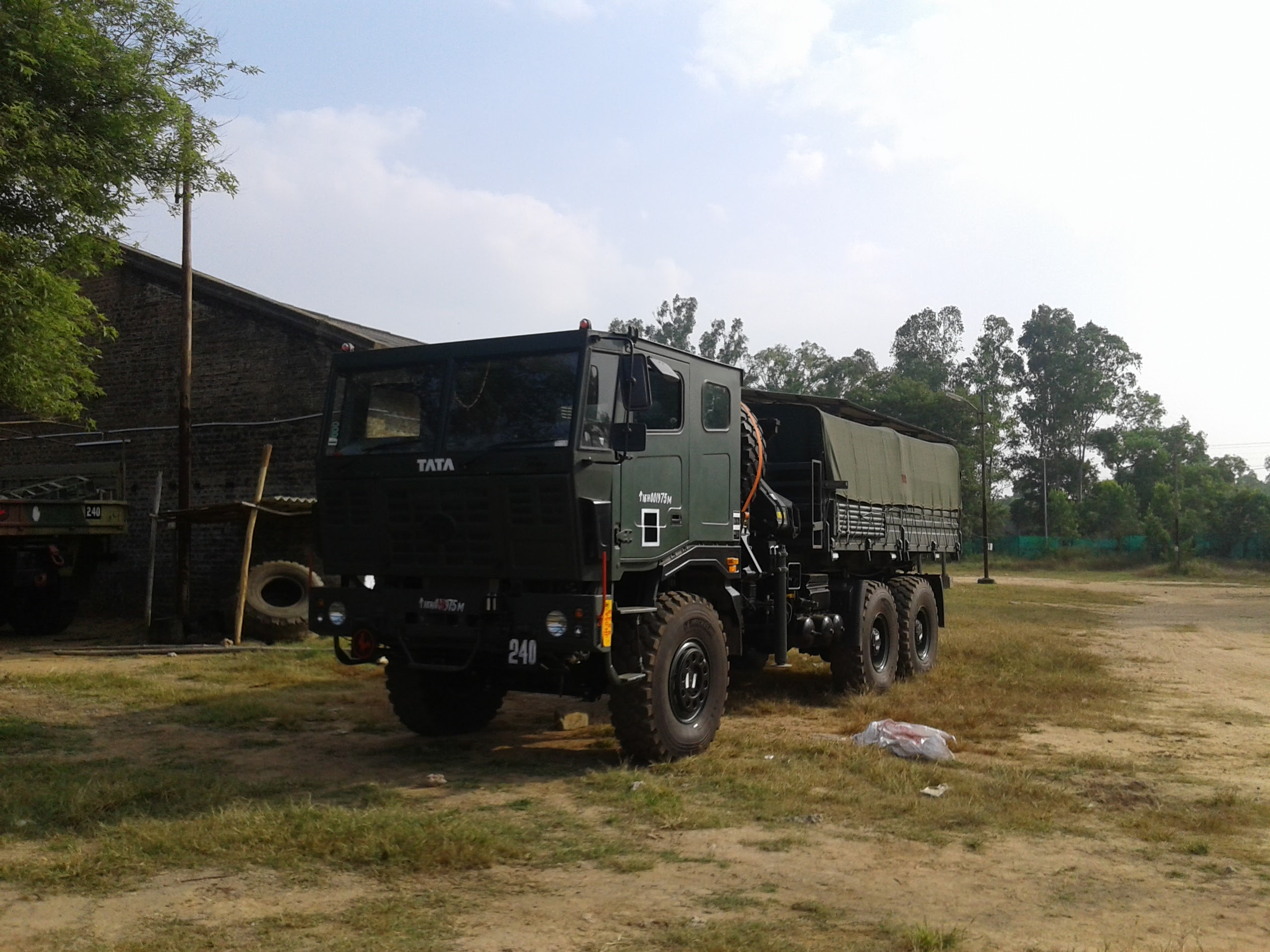
Tata 8x8 LPTA truck

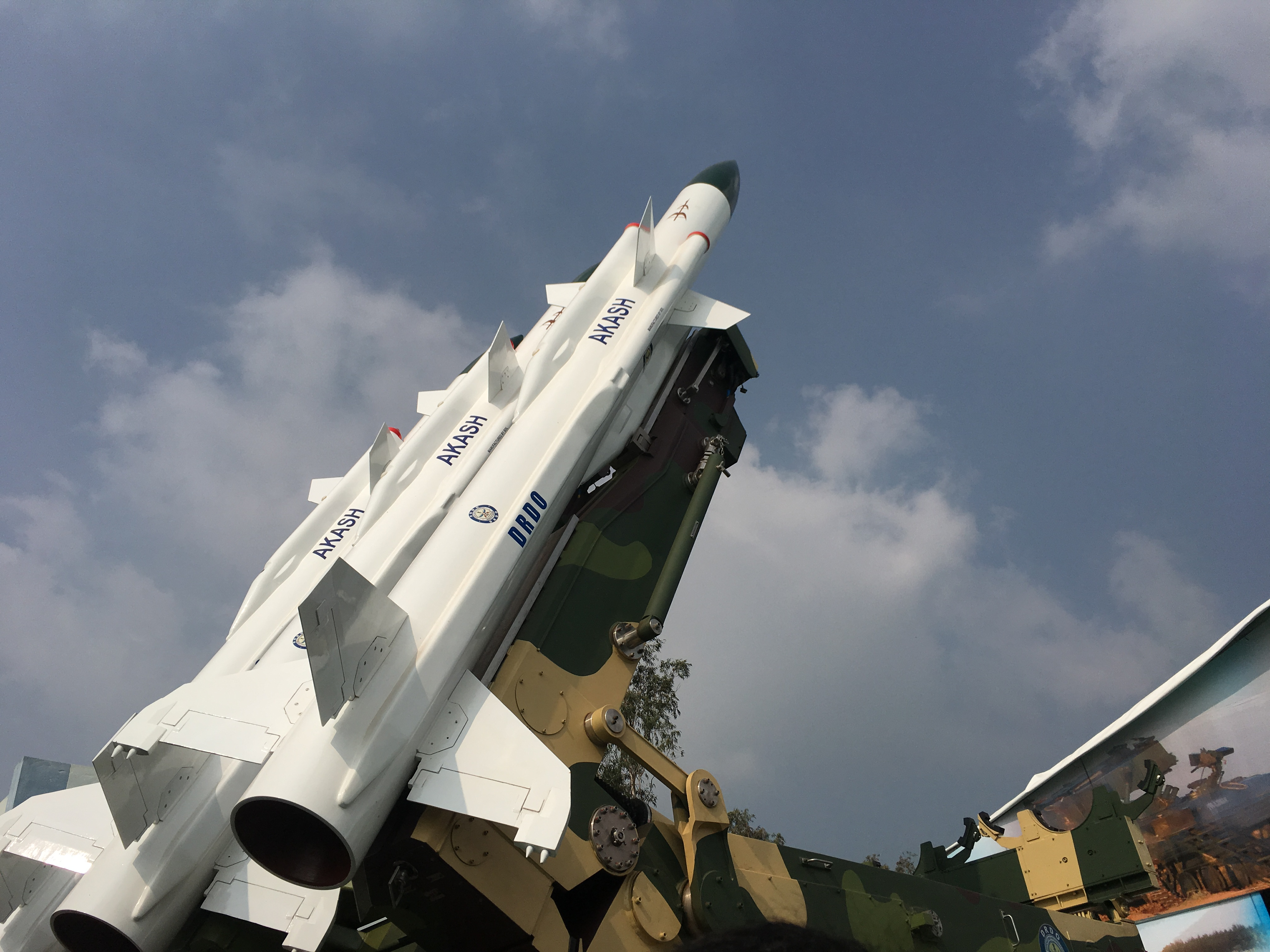
Akash SAM System at Defence Expo.

In 2023, the Royal Moroccan Army, which received 92 Tata 8×8 LPTA 2445 trucks. Tata 8×8 LPTA 2445 trucks is based on Tata 1623 platform which is going to replace Tatra trucks in India.

The Defence Minister Rajnath Singh has stated in 2021 that India was ready to export different types of missile systems, Light Combat Aircraft, helicopters, multi-purpose light transport aircraft, warships and patrol vessels, artillery gun systems, tanks, radars, military vehicles, electronic warfare systems and other weapons systems to Indian Ocean region nations. The Ministry of Defence's Year End Review 2023 states that exports for FY 2022–2023 totalled ₹16,000 crore. It covered 85 nations and reached a ten-fold increase from FY 2016–17. Major platforms exported include the Pinaka multi-barrel rocket launcher, radars, simulators, mine-protected vehicles, armoured vehicles, line replaceable units and parts, thermal imagers, body armours, ammunitions, small arms and avionics components. Other platforms include the Dornier-228, 155 mm/52 calibre DRDO Advanced Towed Artillery Gun System, BrahMos cruise missile, and Akash SAM.

In the fiscal year 2023–2024, defence exports totalled ₹21,083 crores (about $2.63 billion), a 32.5 per cent increase from the previous fiscal year. The data also show a 31-fold increase over the previous ten years when compared to 2013–14. The private sector and the defence public sector entities generated roughly 60% and 40% of exports respectively. About 100 companies are involved in the export of military gear. The total amount of defence exports from 2004–05 to 2013–14 was ₹4,312 crore; from 2014–15 to 2023–24, it increased to ₹88,319 crore. In the first quarter of the financial year 2024–25, defence exports reached ₹6,915 in value. India's total defence exports in the 2024–2025 financial year amounted to ₹23,622 crore (equivalent to ₹240 billion or US$2.5 billion in 2026). The Indian government is targeting ₹50,000 crore (equivalent to ₹520 billion or US$5.4 billion in 2026) worth of defence exports by 2029–30.

== Companies ==
=== State-run ===
Name	Specialization	Revenue (as of 2020)	Operating Income (As of 2020)	Employees (as of March–April 2019)	Notes
Bharat Dynamics	Ammunition and missile systems	₹3,095.2 crore (US$430 million)	₹2,828.8 crore (US$400 million)	3,030	
Bharat Electronics	Avionics and radar	₹32,920 crore (US$4.6 billion)	₹12,480 crore (US$1.7 billion)	9,612	
Bharat Earth Movers	Earthmoving equipment and transportation	₹3,077.4 crore (US$430 million)	₹153.20 crore (US$21 million)	7,185	
Electronics Corporation of India	Communication systems and electronics	₹13.08 billion (US$160 million) (2015)	₹0.52 billion (US$6.5 million) (2015)	1,974	
Hindustan Aeronautics	Aerospace manufacturing	₹21,522.07 crore (US$3.0 billion)	₹3,960.57 crore (US$560 million)	28,345	
Garden Reach Shipbuilders & Engineers	Shipbuilding and ship designing	₹1,658.79 crore (US$230 million)	₹225.20 crore (US$32 million)	2,100	
Goa Shipyard	Shipbuilding	₹₹1,071.76 crore (US$150 million)	₹264.92 crore (US$37 million)	1,472	
Mazagon Dock	Shipbuilding	₹4399.16 crores (US$640 million)		9,000	
Cochin Shipyard	Shipbuilding	₹28,745 crore (2017–2018, US$370 million)		12,000	
Mishra Dhatu Nigam	Metallurgy	₹747 crores (US$110 million)		852	
Hindustan Shipyard	Shipbuilding				
Munitions India	Ammunition				
Armoured Vehicles Nigam	Tanks				
Advanced Weapons and Equipment India	Small arms and artillery guns				
Troop Comforts	Clothing and protection gear				
Yantra India	Ammunition hardware				
India Optel	Optical sensors				
Gliders India	Military parachutes				

=== Private companies ===
Indo-MIM is the largest defence exporter company in India. The following are private Indian companies that are involved in the defence industry.

Name of company	Established	Specialization
Adani Defence & Aerospace	2015	Aerospace and Unmanned Aerial Vehicles
Aerolloy Technologies	2020	Metallurgy
Alpha Design Technologies	2003	Avionics, defence electronics, and space satellite systems
AS Strategic	2021	Diversified defence equipment
Astra Microwave Products	1991	Radar systems
Apollo Micro Systems	1985	Defence electronics, avionics and space satellite systems
Avantel	1985	High frequency communications, radar, SDR and space satellite systems
BrahMos Aerospace	2004	Missile systems
Bharat Forge	1961	Artillery and metallurgy
Centum Electronics	1993	Defense electronics
CRON systems	2015	Cybersecurity and LIDAR
Crown Group	1978	AI, cybersecurity and M.R.I scanning devices
CST Advanced Systems Pvt Ltd	2019	Adhoc frequency communications, Long range mesh radios, Software-defined radio (SDR), Denied GPS tracking and mapping systems, situation awareness systems
CYRAN AI Solutions	2018	AI, Cyber-Physical Security and Nanoelectronics
Data Patterns	1976	Defence electronics
Defsys Solutions	2007	Avionics
DCX Systems	2010	Avionics and wire-harness
Dynamatic Technologies	1973	Aerospace hydraulics and metallurgy
Elecon Engineering	1960	Machinery
EyeROV	2016	UAV
Gridbots Technologies	2009	Armored Autonomous Robotic Vehicle
Godrej & Boyce	1985	Aerospace and precision engineering
Global Strategic Technologies	2011	Aerospace, missile systems and tanks
HBL Power Systems	1976	Battery and power-generating systems
High Energy Batteries Ltd.	1961	Battery and power-generating systems
Jakson Group	1947	Diesel generators
Jeanuvs	2008	Defence electronics, avionics and space satellite systems
Jindal Defence	1947	Arms, armoury and missile systems
Kineco Limited	1994	Composites
Krishna Defence & Allied Industries Ltd.	1996	Metallurgy
Larsen & Toubro	1948	Diversified defence products and equipment
MAK Controls and Systems	1973	Ground support equipment, land-based systems and electronic systems
Megha Engineering and Infrastructures Limited	1989	Defence communications and electronics systems
Nibe Defence and Aerospace	2022	Power electronics, precision and structural engineering
Tardid Technologies	2016	AI-based autonomous vehicles and cybersecurity
Tata Advanced Systems	2007	Aerospace, land-based defence systems, radar systems, missile systems, drones and sonar
Tata Steel Advanced Materials	2012	Composites
Tata Power SED	1975	Defence electronics, UAVs, and missile systems
Texmaco Defence Systems	2017	Armoured vehicles, artillery and weapons
Titagarh Wagons	1982	CBRNe, Mine clearing systems and military trailers
Tonbo Imaging	2003	Imaging systems
Triveni Engineering & Industries	1932	Gearboxes and Gas turbines
SSS Defence	2017	Small arms and metallurgy
Staqu Technologies	2015	AI/surveillance/computer vision
Sisir Radar	2022	Radars
Mahindra Aerospace	2008	Aerospace
Mahindra Defence Systems Ltd.	2012	Armoured vehicles
MKU	1985	Armoury
Paras Defence and Space Technologies Ltd.	1972	Diversified defence equipments
Premier explosives	1980	Diversified defence equipments
PTC Industries	1963	Alloys and metallurgy
MTAR Technologies	1984	Diversified defence equipment and satcoms
Raphe Mphibr Pvt Ltd	1963	Alloys and metallurgy
Rossell Techsys	2009	Composites
Samtel Avionics	2006	Display systems
Exicom Telecom-Systems	1994	Defense communication systems and RF
Sandeep Metalcraft Pvt Ltd	1988	Arms and missile systems
Sika Interplant Systems Ltd.	1969	Gearboxes and turbines
Solar Industries	1983	Diversified defence equipments
Sagar Defence Engineering	2015	Unmanned Marine Vehicles
Torus Robotics	2015	UAV
VEM Technologies	1993	Aerospace
ideaForge	2007	UAV
Optimized Electrotech	2017	UAV
Walchandnagar Industries	1908	Missile systems
Sahajanand Laser Technology Limited	1989	Manufacturing & Exporting of Microwave Absorbers, RADAR Absorbent Materials, Shielded Anechoic Chambers and EMI/EMC Test Ranges for both Civil and Defence purposes.
News Safety Solutions	2015	N.E.W.S Safety Solutions: Bulletproof Vehicles & Cars Manufacturer / Delhi.

=== Other defence entities ===
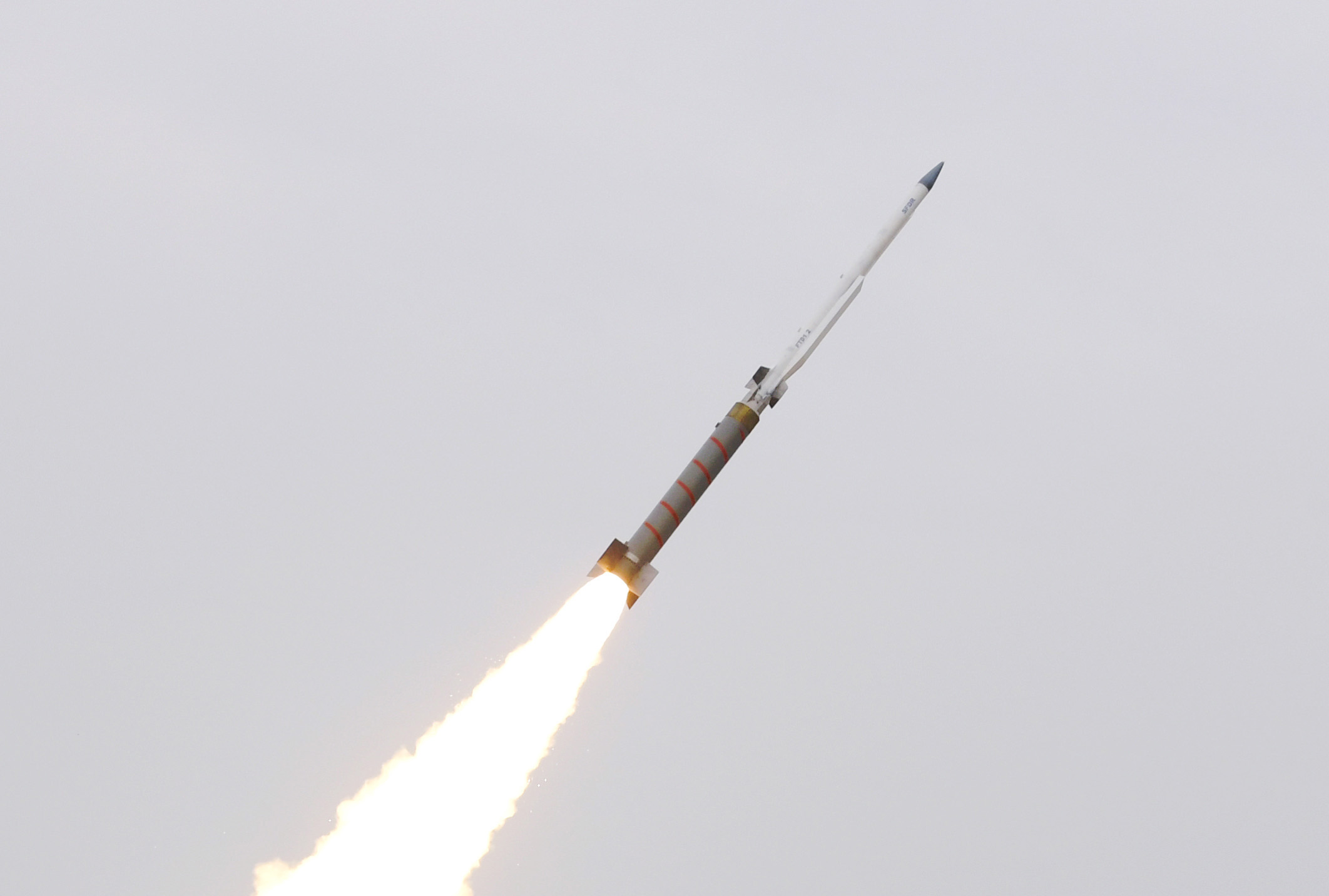
Solid Fuel Ducted Ramjet based missile being tested in 2019

- Semiconductor Laboratory (SCL)
- DRDO
- Surface Robotics Laboratory(SRL)
- CSIR-CMERI
- ISRO, for aerospace manufacturing
- MTAR Technologies, missile system components manufacturing for ISRO
- NewSpace India Limited for low-cost missile system components manufacturing
- INOXCVA for ISRO cryogenic equipments

== Domestic defence production ==
=== Indigenisation ===
In September 2019, DRDO formulated the "DRDO Policy and Procedures for Transfer of Technology" and released information on "DRDO-Industry Partnership: Synergy and Growth and DRDO Products with Potential for Export". During the Vibrant Goa Global Expo and Summit 2019 in October, DRDO signed technology transfer contracts with 16 Indian companies, including 3 startups, to produce products for the use by Indian Armed Forces. This included high shelf life, high nutrition, ready-to-eat on-the-go food products to be consumed in the difficult terrain and bad weather. To boost the domestic defense production capability, Defence Minister Rajnath Singh's November 2019 delegation included 50 Indian companies scouting for the Russian partners and joint ventures for the defence production in India. DRDO and ISRO have agreed to collaborate in India's crewed orbital spacecraft project called Gaganyaan during which DRDOs various laboratories will tailor their defence capabilities to suit the needs of ISRO's human space mission. To become technology research and production leader, reduce reliance on the imports and increase self-reliance, DRDO Chief called for more collaboration with the industry, private sector, research and education institutes including IITs and NITs.

=== Make in India ===
The Modi government in its first year cleared 39 capital procurement proposals, of which 32 proposals worth ₹88,900 crore (US$9.2 billion) (or 96% of the value of total proposals) were categorized as Buy (Indian) and Buy and Make (India)—the top two prioritized domestic industry-centric procurement categories as per the defense procurement procedure (DPP). Under Prime Minister Narendra Modi's flagship scheme, "Make in India in Defence," the government's policies encourage domestic manufacturing and the export of defense equipment. It has already resulted in substantial growth of defence exports from the country as it jumped by 700% in just two years, from $213 million in FY 2016–17 to $1.5 billion in FY 2018–19. Encouraged by this scheme, the government set a target of achieving defence exports worth ₹35,000 crore ($4.87 billion) in the next four years. Under "Make in India" initiative, the Indian government is also focusing upon indigenous defence communication systems. A private-academia collaboration between CST Advanced Systems Pvt Ltd and IIT Jammu has developed anti-GPS jamming and identification friend or foe (IFF) devices to address critical challenges faced by the armed forces.

In July 2015, the defence ministry eased export regulations and stopped demanding multiple assurances on end-use from foreign governments even for sale of components by Indian entities. Some critics say that instead of encouraging the manufacturing of equipment in India, the Modi government has given financial powers to the Armed forces to purchase equipment up to ₹500 crores without the consultation of the Ministry. This will further increase the types of weapons, their spares and components, cost of maintainability which will result in non-compatibility and standardisation problems in the near future.

India's defence output value increased to roughly ₹1.27 lakh crore in FY 2023–24, from ₹1,08,684 crore in FY 2022–23, marking the country's highest-ever rise. The value of defence output has climbed by more than 60% during FY 2019–20. According to the Ministry of Defence, of the overall value of output in FY 2023–2024, PSUs contributed around 79.2%, while the private sector provided 20.8%. In FY 2023–24, defence exports reached a record high of ₹21,083 crore, up 32.5% from the previous fiscal year when they were ₹15,920 crores. The value of Indian defence production is expected to exceed ₹1.60 lakh crore (equivalent to ₹1.7 trillion or US$17 billion in 2026) between 2025 and 2026, and the Indian government is targeting the domestic manufacturing of defence equipment valued at ₹3 lakh crore (equivalent to ₹3.1 trillion or US$32 billion in 2026).

=== Research and development ===
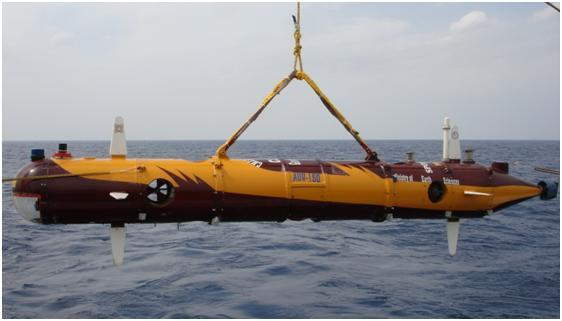
CMERI developed Autonomous Underwater Vehicle (AUV-150)

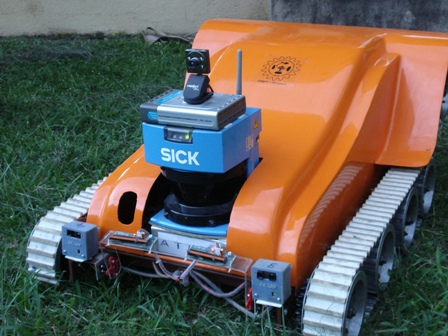
CMERI developed All Terrain Robot (ATR-II)

In 2024, Rajnath Singh, the Minister of Defence, stated that private sector defence companies need to take a more leading role in the industry, as they are better suited to innovate and respond to sectoral changes. As of 2024, research and development (R&D) in the Indian defence industry is low compared to global peer companies, with Indian defence companies allocating 1.2% of their revenue to R&D compared to the global average of 3.4%. There are companies that are exceptions to the low levels of R&D, with HAL allocating 9.3% of revenue to R&D, making the company among a leader in R&D spending globally, and Bharat Dynamics allocating 6.1% to R&D spending.

=== FDI in defence ===
Even though the Modi government has been trying hard to get FDI in the defence sector by first raising the cap from 26% to 74% through automatic route and 100% through MoD's approval, whereby the investing foreign entities can have ownership up to 100% in the defence manufacturing, which has received a dismal response with a meagre investment of just ₹56 lacs (US$0.08 million) in 2014–15, ₹71 lac (US$0.10 million) in 2015–16, ₹7 lacs (US$0.01 million) in 2017–18 and ₹15 crores (US$2.18 million) during 2018–19.

Year	Total FDI in defence
2014–15	USD 0.08 million (₹56 lacs)
2015–16	USD 0.10 million (₹71 lac)
2017–18	USD 0.01 million (₹7 lacs)
2018–19	USD 2.18 million (₹15 crores)

== Negative import list ==
An import embargo on 101 defence items was announced on 9 August 2020. Over five years, the items will be prohibited from being imported.

On 31 May 2021 GoI announced the ban on 108 items that were excluded from the early list. This also includes a roadmap of five years for the promotion of indigenous. The list was described as the "2nd Positive List for Indigenisation" by the government. These include weapon systems like artillery guns, assault rifles, corvettes, transport aircraft, light combat helicopters (LCHs) and even wheeled armoured fighting vehicles (AFVs).

== Involvement of arms dealers and middlemen ==
Despite the strategic and economic importance of the defence sector, there have been numerous scandals that have been linked to defence deals which involve the import of foreign arms by the Indian government. Many of these scandals, include allegations related to bribery and the alleged involvement of middlemen. These alleged middlemen are also termed as lobbyists, arms agents or arms dealers. Until the 1980s, agenting or lobbying on behalf of foreign defence companies was legal in India, however due to the political fallout from the Bofors Scandal, which happened in the 1980s, the Indian Government banned agents from being involved in defence deals. This was due to the emergence of allegations against certain Indian politicians and defence officials of receiving payoffs to clinch the deal the between Bofors and the Indian Government.

Even though arms dealers or arms agents are controversial within the defence sector, it has been reported that their role and involvement are critical for any defence deal to take place between foreign defence companies and the Indian Government. Allegedly, arms agents can manipulate the procurement process because they have the means to pay substantial commissions to politicians, military officials and bureaucrats, therefore making them ever-present in defence deals. In addition to this, members of the Ministry of Defence and military officials have stated that arms agents have the power to manipulate what is written in weapons test reports, and General V.K Singh, a former Indian Chief of the Army Staff, stated that the reach of lobbyists within the Defence Ministry extends to the level where agents have access to classified intelligence and know the inner workings of the ministry.

According to the Central Bureau of Investigation (CBI), Sudhir Choudhrie, Suresh Nanda and Vipin Khanna were the largest and most powerful arms dealers for decades. Allegedly, Khanna, Choudhrie and Nanda, started dominating the defence sector since before the Bofors Scandal in the 1980s, and their families have maintained their positions. Supposedly, their commissions from arms deals could be up to as high as 15%. Reportedly, Khanna, Choudhrie and Nanda played critical roles in getting defence deals approved because they have the capabilities to get a deal through the political and bureaucratic procurement process, due to their influence and connections within India. All three men and members of their families have been accused in several defence scandals, however, none of the allegations against them have ever been proven.

Several other individuals have also been alleged arms dealers or arms agents. This includes Abhishek Verma, whose parents Shrikant Verma and Veena Verma both were Rajya Sabha MPs for 3 decades. He was directly involved in 2 deals of the Indian military, being the Scorpene Submarines purchase by the Indian Navy in 2005. Verma was also accused by the CBI in Rheinmetall Air Defence scandal in 2012. Verma was arrested by the CBI for violating the Official Secrets Act, but in 2017, Verma was discharged by the courts due to lack of evidence against him. In January 2025 after his exoneration, Verma joined full time politics as Chief Coordinator of Shiv Sena a Hindu Right Wing party which is a member of ruling NDA coalition at the centre. Another individual accused of being an arms dealer is Sanjay Bhandari, who fled to the United Kingdom in 2016, and is currently fighting an extradition case, as the Indian Government wants Bhandari extradited to India, to face charges of money laundering and tax evasion. The CBI also accused Mohinder Singh Sahni of being an arms dealer, during an investigation probe into him.

Another is Sushen Mohan Gupta, who (according to the INSAF Bulletin) had received Rs. 1818 billion from more than 15 deals including Turbomeca, purchase of Dassault Mirages, purchase of Dassault Rafales, AugustaWestland VVIP helicopters, SpetsTechnoExport for upgrades to Ka-25 and Mi-17 helicopters, as well as MiG-21 and Su-30 jets, Elbit Systems for surveillance, Sukhoi missile warning systems (a deal between the Israeli defence ministry and Elisra Group), 56 navy helicopters to receive upgrades, three deals for spares for Antonov aircraft and more.

In addition to this, non-Indian citizens have also been accused of allegedly giving bribes and kickbacks to influence defence deals in India. For example, Christian Michel, a British citizen, who was extradited to India from the United Arab Emirates in 2018. Michel has been accused by the CBI and the Enforcement Directorate, of being one of the middlemen in the 2013 Indian helicopter bribery scandal, and has been in judicial custody in India for over five years, with his bail being denied by the Indian courts.

== See also ==
- List of equipment of the Indian Army
- Military–industrial complex
- Space industry of India
- Economy of India
