= Naresh Chandra Murmu =

- Born: 1 September 1971 (age 55); West Bengal, India
- Education: Indian Institutes of Engineering Science and Technology; Indian Institute of Science; IIT (BHU) Varanasi
- Known for: Five Axis Micro Milling Machine
- Awards: 2012 CSIR-Raman Research Fellowship; 2012 CSIR@70 Recognition; 2012 National Design Award; 2015 VASVIK Award (Mechanical & Structural Sciences & Technology); 2019 Fellow of Indian National Academy of Engineering (INAE); 2022 NASI
- Scientific career
- Fields: Mechanical Engineering
- Workplaces: Central Mechanical Engineering Research Institute; Academy of Scientific and Innovative Research; National Metallurgical Laboratory; National Aerospace Laboratories

Naresh Chandra Murmu (Bengali:নরেশ চন্দ্র মূর্মূ, Santali:ᱱᱚᱨᱮᱥ ᱪᱚᱸᱫᱽᱨᱚ ᱢᱩᱨᱢᱩ) is the current director of CSIR-Central Mechanical Engineering Research Institute Durgapur He is also Dean (Engineering) and Professor at Academy of Scientific and Innovative Research. He also took over additional charge as Director of Central Glass and Ceramic Research Institute from 1 August 2024. He was also acting Director of CSIR-National Metallurgical Laboratory Jamshedpur (Additional Charge)

== Career ==
He began working as a scientist at CSIR-Central Mechanical Engineering Research Institute, Durgapur in 2003. Prior to this, he worked as a scientist in CSIR-National Aerospace Laboratories, Bangalore.

He worked as a visiting scientist at the University of Erlangen–Nuremberg Germany from 2001 to 2003, and at Northwestern University, United States from 2011 to 2012.

== Research ==
Murmu's current research interests include Additive and Smart Manufacturing, Graphene Composite, Ink & Lubricants and graphene ultracapacitor.

Dr Murmu has also keen interest in the educational development for the Santal people and Santali language. He has dedicatedly involved in popularising Ol Chiki script around the globe through development and filing for Ol Chiki (Unicode block) at international level. Additionally, he has co-authored A Concise Santali English Dictionary.

== Awards ==
- Dr Murmu is a Fellow of Indian National Academy of Engineering (INAE) and National Academy of Sciences, India (NASI).
- Dr Murmu is a recipient of VASVIK Award-2015, National Design Award (2012), CSIR-Raman Research Fellowship (2011), DAAD Fellowship (German Academic Exchange Service)-2000, CSIR@70 Recognition for Developing Five Axis Micro Milling Machine (2012) and Co-Author of MSEB Best Paper Award, 2014 (Elsevier).
