= Indigenous Defence Equipment Exporters Association =

Indian government agency

Agency overview
- Formed: October 18, 2019; 6 years ago
- Agency executives: Dr RK Tyagi, Director; Major Gen PM Vats, Director
- Parent agency: Government of India
- Website: ideea.in

The Indigenous Defence Equipment Exporters Association (IDEEA) is the nodal-agency of the Government of India tasked with handling exports of Indian military equipment. The organisation is based in Delhi.

== History ==
The Defence Production Policy of 2018 targeted achieving annual defence exports of Rs 35,000 crore by 2025. The IDEEA was formed to facilitate achieving this. The organisation was formally inaugurated on 18 October 2019 by Bipin Rawat, the acting Chief of Indian Army, who reiterated the target in the presence of Defence Attaches from various countries.

== Responsibilities ==
The IDEEA's aim is to make India “one of the top three defence equipment exporters in the world.” It is the nodal-agency tasked with processing all export inquiries from global customers of Indian military equipment. The agency will serve as the interface between Indian military equipment producers and global customers.

== Organisation ==
The Indigenous Defence Equipment Exporters Association is a non-profit organisation created under the terms of the Section 8 of the Companies Act.

== See also ==
- Defence industry of India
