= Triveni Engineering & Industries =

Indian company

Triveni Engineering & Industries Limited
- Formerly: The Ganga Sugar Corporation Limited; Gangeshwar Limited
- Type: Public
- Traded as: NSE: TRIVENI; BSE: 532356
- ISIN: INE256C01024
- Industry: Conglomerate
- Founded: 27 July 1932; 94 years ago
- Headquarters: Noida, India
- Area served: India
- Key people: Dhruv M. Sawhney (Chairman & Managing Director); Tarun Sawhney (Vice Chairman & Managing Director); Nikhil Sawhney (Director)
- Revenue: ▲₹5,746.88 crore (March 2025); ▲₹5220.10 crore (March 2024); ▲₹4698.33 crore (March 2021)
- Website: www.trivenigroup.com

Triveni Engineering & Industries Limited (TEIL) is an Indian conglomerate with diversified businesses in sugar and engineering, headquartered in Noida, India. It was founded in 1932. The company is engaged in sugar and alcohol, including ethanol production, power co-generation, power transmission, including industrial gears & gearboxes and defence, water treatment solutions and FMCG brands. It is the second-largest sugar producer in India.

== History ==
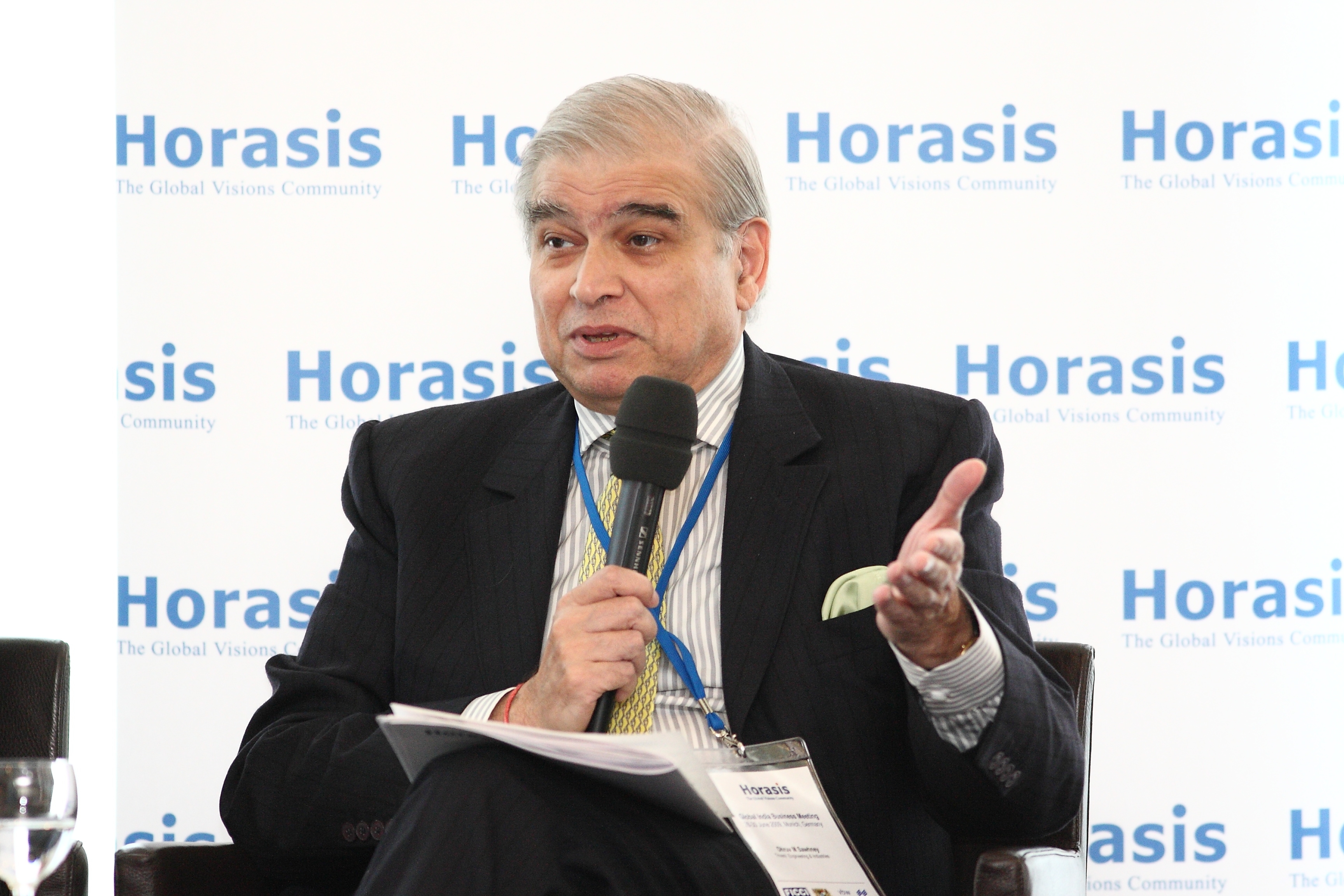
Dhruv Sawhney, Chairman and Managing Director of Triveni Engineering & Industries at the Horasis Global India Business Meeting 2009

Dhruv Sawhney, Chairman and Managing Director of Triveni Engineering & Industries at the Horasis Global India Business Meeting 2009.

The company was founded on 27 July 1932, and incorporated under the provisions of Companies Act 1956, as The Ganga Sugar Corporation Limited. It received a certificate of commencement of business on 6 February 1933. It acquired the Khatauli sugar plant in 1952.

In 1973, it was renamed Gangeshwar Limited from The Ganga Sugar Corporation. It was renamed Triveni Engineering & Industries Limited in 2000.

In 2005, it started a rural retail chain, Khushali Bazaar, under its fully owned retail arm, Triveni Retail Ventures Ltd, which operated in Uttar Pradesh and Uttarakhand. Later, it was shut down in 2013.

In 2007, the company entered the alcohol business by setting up its first distillery in Muzaffarpur, which has a capacity to produce 160 kilo per day. In 2019, the company set up another distillery at Sabitgarh unit with a capacity of 160KLPD.

On 13 June 2018, a concession agreement was signed between National Mission for Clean Ganga (NMCG), Uttar Pradesh Jal Nigam, and Triveni Engineering to develop India's first city-wide integrated sewage infrastructure for Mathura at an estimated cost of over ₹437 crore on a Hybrid Annuity-based mode.

In 2020, the company forayed into the country liquor space by launching four liquor brands, including Miss Rangeeli and Shahenshah. In March 2021, it was assigned to build a desalination plant in the Maldives.

In November 2021, Engineering Power Transmission business signed a 10-year contract with US-based GEAE Technology to manufacture the 'LM2500' gas turbine base and enclosure, which powers many of the Indian Navy's vessels.

The company, on 6 February 2025, signed a Memorandum of Understanding (MoU) with Rolls-Royce Marine North America Inc. for collaboration on the programmes for the AG 9160 4 MW (5,400 hp) marine gas turbine generators (GTG) in India.

Recently, the company announced Indian-made foreign liquor (IMFL) business has started commercial operations on 16 July 2024.

In March 2024, Triveni Engineering & Industries Ltd, acquired a 25.43 per cent stake in Sir Shadi Lal Enterprises Ltd (SSEL) for Rs 35 crore. Later in June 2024, the company announced the acquisition of an additional 36.34% stake in sugar firm Sir Shadi Lal Enterprises Ltd for Rs 45 crore, bringing its total stake to 61.77%. This acquisition is expected to enhance operational efficiencies and align with Triveni's strategic objectives.

In December 2024, Triveni Engineering & Industries Ltd. (TEIL) announced the approval of a Composite Scheme of Arrangement, involving its the demerger of its PTB Undertaking to Triveni Power Transmission, pending regulatory approvals.

== Operations ==
The company operates eight sugar mills at Khatauli, Deoband, Sabitgarh, Chandanpur, Rani Nangal, Milak Narayanpur, Ramkola and Shamli in Uttar Pradesh. The company also has six co-generation power plants across five sugar units. Currently, the total distillation capacity of the company stands at 860 KLPD. TEIL has co-generation plants with a total capacity to generate power of 105 MW.

It has gear manufacturing facility in Mysore. It is engaged in manufacturing high-speed gears and gearboxes of up to 70MW capacity with speeds of 70,000 RPM.

The company also sells refined sugar (40 per cent) and produces pharma grade sugar, which it sells mainly through institutional buyers, like soft drinks, candy and ice-cream makers. TEIL is also into water treatment solutions and has undertaken various sewage treatment projects. The company has got 120 plants working over the last few decades. In the EPC division, Triveni had undertaken hydel projects, waste treatment and water projects and coal beneficiation and minerals concession projects.

The company is engaged in manufacturing defence products mainly related to the Indian Navy. Their defence supplies include propulsion systems, steam turbines and turbo steam engines.

== Financials ==
In FY25, the company reported a revenue of 5,746.88 crore (March 2025) with a profit 324.14 crore.

== Awards and recognition ==
- The company was ranked at 5 in the list of 'Top 10 Sugar Companies by Highest Sales in India', by Indiastat India Top 10 Yearbook 2016.
- It was awarded the Frost & Sullivan Growth Excellence Award in the water and wastewater treatment industry category by Frost & Sullivan in 2010.
- The company won the Greentech Platinum Safety Award and Greentech Silver Safety Award.
- The Khatauli co-generation plant won the Gold award in EKDKN Innov Award 2017 under the OHS category in power.
- In 2017, the distillery unit won the Golden Peacock Business Excellence Award in the chemical sector from the Institute of Directors (India).

== See also ==
- Sugar industry of India
