= Kaleshwar, Lalitpur =

Kaleshwar कालेश्वर
- Village of Mahankal Rural Municipality
- Location in Nepal
- Coordinates: 27.51°N 85.43°E
- Country: Nepal
- Province: Province No. 3
- District: Lalitpur District

Population (1991)
  - Total: 1,429
- Time zone: UTC+5:45 (Nepal Time)

Kaleshwar is a village and former Village Development Committee that is now part of Mahankal Rural Municipality in Province No. 3 of central Nepal. At the time of the 1991 Nepal census it had a population of 1,429 living in 230 individual households.
