= Bukhel =

Bukhel बूखेल
- Village of Mahankal Rural Municipality
- Location in Nepal
- Coordinates: 27.50°N 85.36°E
- Country: Nepal
- Province: Bagmati
- District: Lalitpur District

Population (1991)
  - Total: 4,813
- Time zone: UTC+5:45 (Nepal Time)

Bhukhel is a village and former Village Development Committee that is now part of Mahankal Rural Municipality in Bagmati Province of central Nepal. At the time of the 1991 Nepal census it had a population of 4,813 in 282 individual households.
