= Mahankal Rural Municipality =

Mahankal Rural Municipality महाङ्काल गाउँपालिका
- Rural Municipality
- Location in Nepal Mahankal Rural Municipality (Nepal)
- Country: Nepal
- Province: Bagmati Province
- District: Lalitpur District
- Established: March 2017

Government
  - Chairperson: Ganesh Kc (Nepali congress)
  - Vice Chairperson: Dolma Maya Tamang

Area
  - Total: 82.44 km^{2} (31.83 sq mi)

Population (2011 Nepal census)
  - Total: 9,453
  - Density: 114.66/km^{2} (297.0/sq mi)
- Website: mahankalmun.gov.np

Mahankal Rural Municipality Nepali: महाङ्काल गाउँपालिका, is a Rural Municipality in Lalitpur District in Bagmati Province of Nepal that was established in 2017 by merging the former Village development committees Bukhel, Manikhel, Gotikhel, Chandanpur, Kaleshwar and Thuladurlung. The centre of this rural municipality is located at Old-Gotikhel.

== Demographics ==
At the time of the 2011 Nepal census, Mahankal Rural Municipality had a population of 9,526. Of these, 58.2% spoke Nepali, 40.6% Tamang, 0.4% Sunwar, 0.3% Newar, 0.1% Maithili, 0.1% Pahari and 0.2% other languages as their first language.

In terms of ethnicity/caste, 48.0% were Hill Brahmin, 41.1% Tamang, 6.2% Chhetri, 1.1% Damai/Dholi, 1.1% Brahmu/Baramo, 0.8% Kami, 0.4% Newar, 0.4% Sunuwar, 0.2% Magar, 0.1% Ghale, 0.1% Pahari and 0.5% others.

In terms of religion, 59.3% were Hindu, 39.8% Buddhist and 0.9% Christian.

In terms of literacy, 71.2% could read and write, 2.9% could only read and 25.9% could neither read nor write.
