= Man Mohan Suri =

Indian mechanical engineer

- Born: 13 January 1928; Punjab, India
- Died: 25 July 1981 (aged 53)
- Known for: Suri transmission; Introducing farm tractors in India
- Awards: 1961 Padma Shri; 1962 Shanti Swarup Bhatnagar Prize
- Scientific career
- Fields: Mechanical engineering
- Institutions: Central Mechanical Engineering Research Institute

Man Mohan Suri (1928–1981) was an Indian mechanical engineer and the Director of Central Mechanical Engineering Research Institute (CMERI), Durgapur. He is best known for inventing Suri Transmission, a hydromechanical transmission unit, reported to increase the efficiency of diesel locomotives and he held the patent for the inventions. The technology is known to have led to 36 patent specifications in eleven countries. He is also credited with the conceptualization of Swaraj farm tractor, a product of Punjab Tractors Ltd. and held another patent for his development of Railway truck wheel assembly. He received the fourth highest Indian civilian award of the Padma Shri in 1961. The Council of Scientific and Industrial Research, the apex agency of the Government of India for scientific research, awarded him the Shanti Swarup Bhatnagar Prize for Science and Technology, one of the highest Indian science awards for his contributions to Engineering Sciences in 1962. The Indian Institute of Technology, Delhi has instituted an annual award, Padmashri Manmohan Suri Project Award, for honoring the best mechanical project by its alumni.

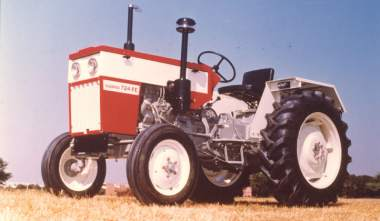
Swaraj Tractor, the first indigenous tractor designed and manufactured in India.
