= Gotikhel =

- Village of Mahankal Rural Municipality
- Location in Nepal
- Coordinates: 27.50°N 85.40°E
- Country: Nepal
- Province: Province No. 3
- District: Lalitpur District

Area
  - Total: 9.95 km^{2} (3.84 sq mi)
- Elevation: 1,470 m (4,820 ft)

Population (2011)
  - Total: 1,855
  - Density: 186/km^{2} (483/sq mi)
- Time zone: UTC+5:45 (Nepal Time)
- Postal code: 44711
- Area code: 01

Gotikhel is a village and former Village Development Committee that is now part of Mahankal Rural Municipality in Province No. 3 of central Nepal. At the time of the 1991 Nepal census it had a population of 1,654 living in 323 households.

To promote local culture, Gotikhel has one FM radio station Radio Lalitpur - 100.9 MHz which is a community radio station.

Gotikhel is located in southern Lalitpur, in the Kathmandu Valley, and lies 42 kilometres from the capital. The main town of Gotikhel is at the base of a valley, surrounded by mountains on all sides. Gotikhel is one of five wards which make up the Mahankal Rural Municipality. The local Municipality offices are also based here, including the Executive Office, the Forestry Office and the Surveying Office etc.

The area is well known for its many important and unique religious sites. The Baitadi Dhaam Hindu Temple is of particular significance, and receives over 200 visitors from elsewhere in the Valley every Saturday, and many more during Hindu festivals.

Gotikhel is surrounded by stunning scenery and is an ideal place to go hiking. With 3 rivers flowing through it, there are picturesque trails along the base of the Valley, and additionally there are trails of varying difficulty through the mountain areas. One such trek is up to the Kalaswor Temple at the peak of a nearby mountain, and can be reached on foot in under 2 hours. There are several existing guest houses and homestays offering tourists a base from which to explore the local area.

The main source of employment is in agriculture, with many fields growing vegetables such as peas, potatoes and cauliflower. Additionally, there are tea farms and a green tea factory opened in Gotikhel in 2018.

In the market area of Gotikhel, one can find many tea shops and restaurants, offering a variety of Nepali dishes. The local seamstresses offer local tailor-made clothing in traditional richly coloured fabrics and present a cheaper alternative to clothing in Kathmandu.

There is public transport to Gotikhel from Kathmandu, and the bus takes approximately 3 hours.

== Gallery ==
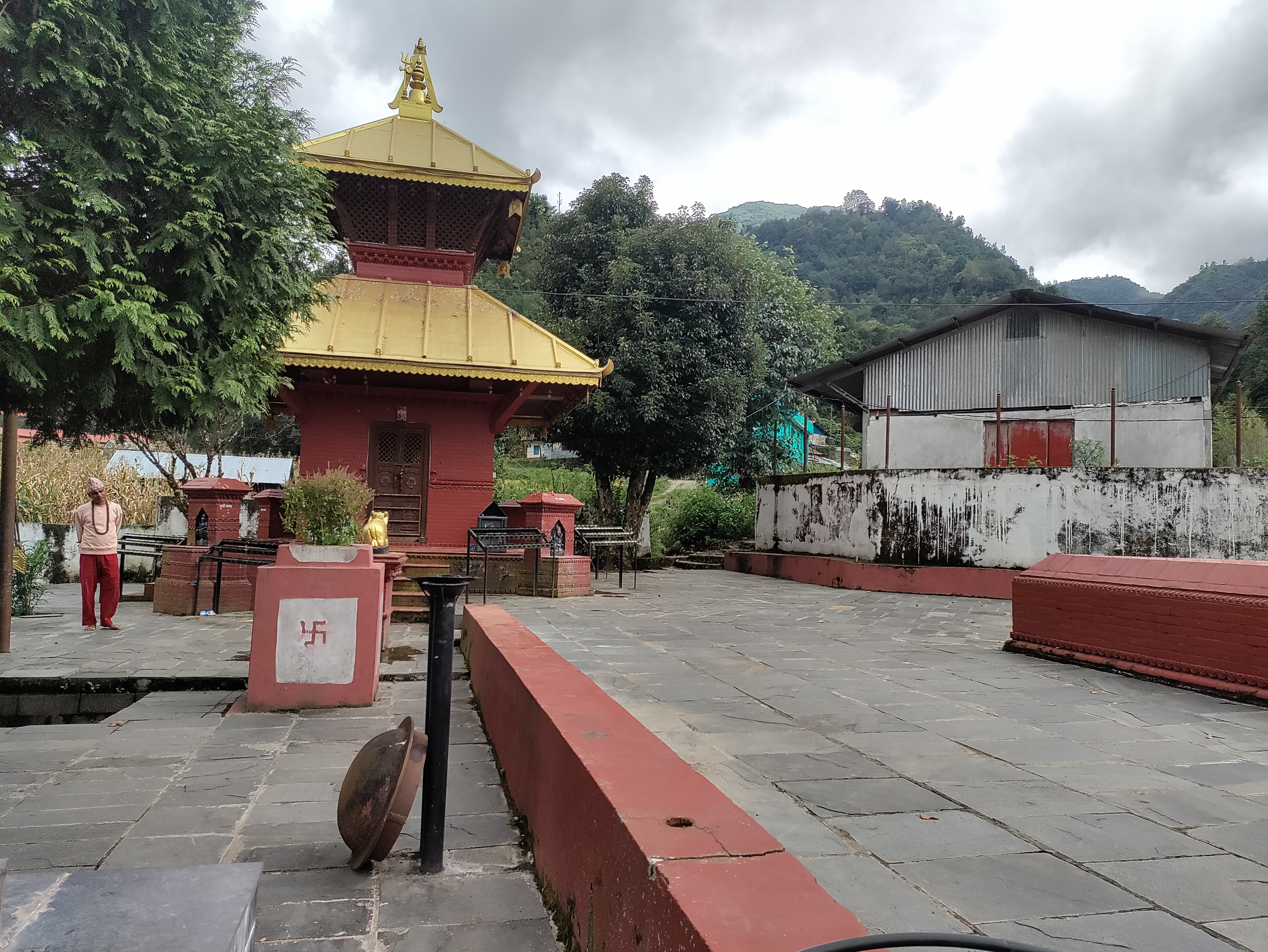
Baitarni Dhaam, Gotikhel, Lalitpur, Nepal(It has been completely destroyed by the flood, the flood occurred for two days, 28th Sept, 2024)

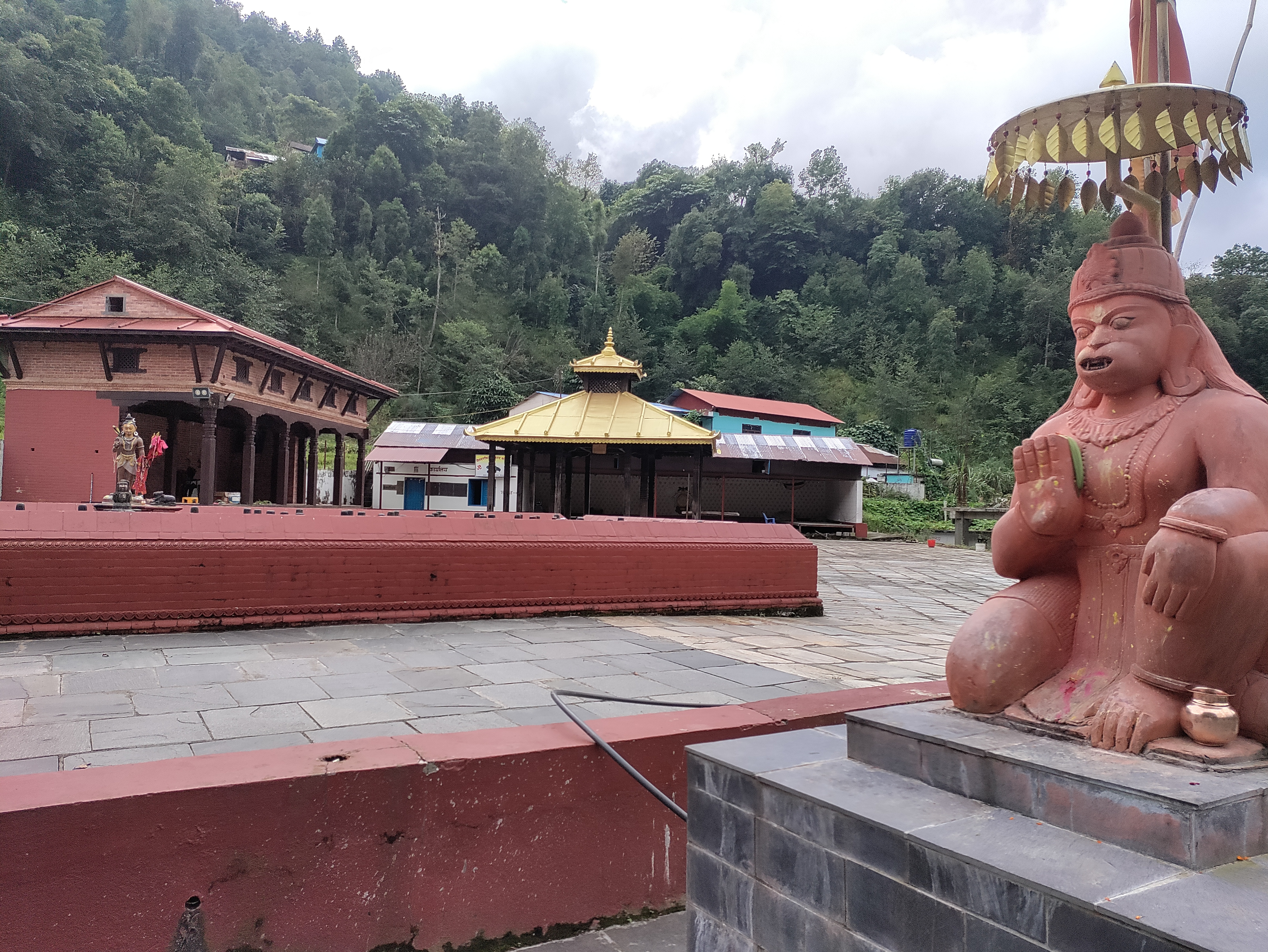
Baitarni Dhaam

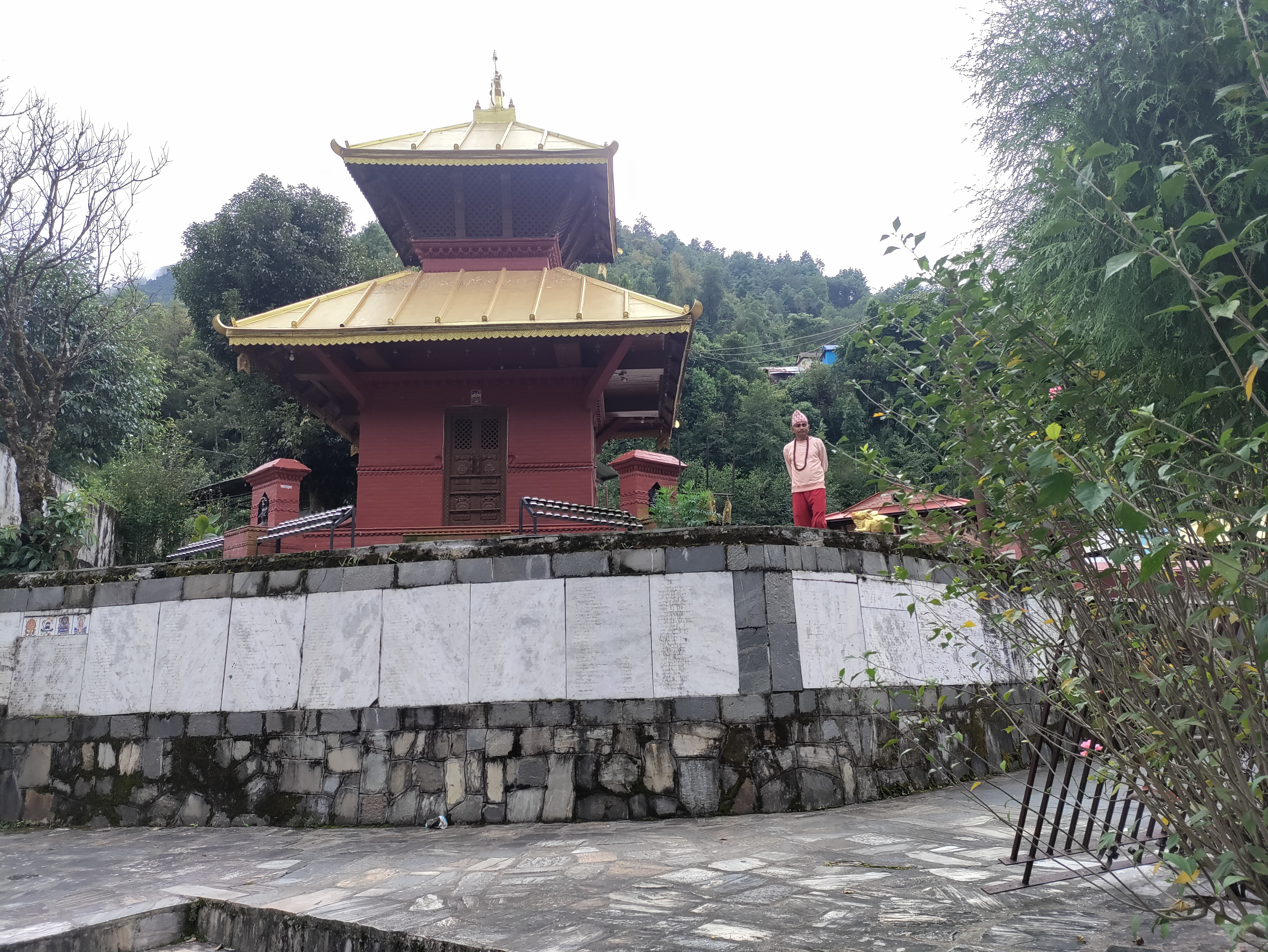
Shiva Temple at Baitarni Dhaam, Gotikhel

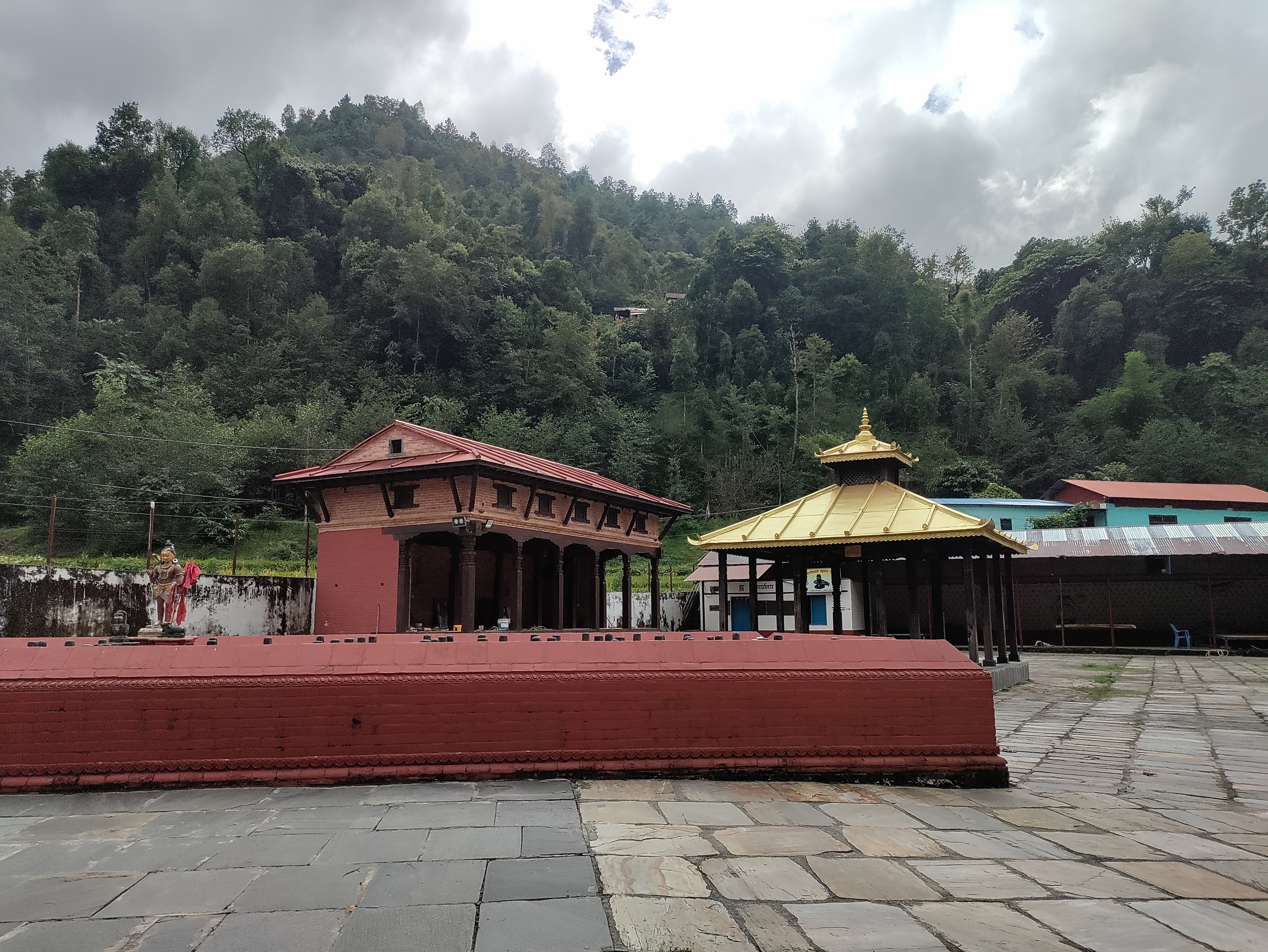
Baitarni Dhaam
