= Manikhel =

Manikhel मानिखेल
- Village of Mahankal Rural Municipality
- Location in Nepal
- Coordinates: 27.52°N 85.40°E
- Country: Nepal
- Province: Province No. 3
- District: Lalitpur District

Population (2021)
  - Total: 1,772
- Time zone: UTC+5:45 (Nepal Time)

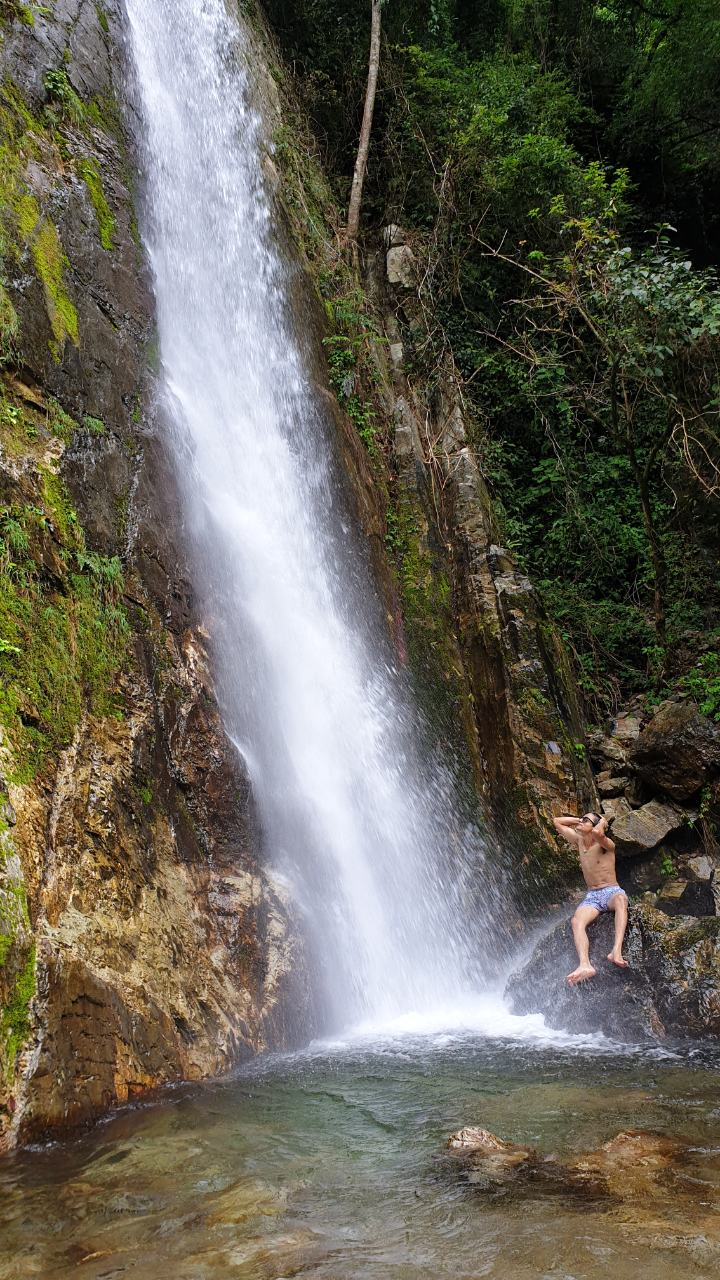
Manikhel Waterfall- the simbafall

Manikhel is a village and former Village Development Committee that is now part of Mahankal Rural Municipality in Province No. 3 of central Nepal. According to the 2021 Nepal census it had a population of 1772 living in 402 individual households.
