= Jakson Group =

Indian engineering organisation

- Type: Private
- Founded: 1947; 79 years ago
- Founder: Jai Kishan Gupta, Satish Kumar Gupta
- Headquarters: Noida, Uttar Pradesh, India
- Key people: Sameer Gupta; Sundeep Gupta
- Products: Diesel generator, solar modules, solar products, electrolyzer, gasification
- Services: EPC
- Number of employees: 2000
- Subsidiaries: Jakson Green Vehicles Private Limited
- Website: www.jakson.com

Jakson Group is an Indian energy and industrial technology company with corporate headquarters in Noida, Uttar Pradesh. The company manufactures and sells diesel generator sets and solar PV modules. Jakson operates four key businesses in India – powergen & distribution, solar, EPC and defence.

The powergen business manufactures and sells diesel generator sets, and also constructs diesel power plants. The solar business develops solar power plants, executes solar EPC projects, and manufactures and sells solar modules and products. The company also manufactures hydrogen electrolyzer.

The engineering, procurement, and construction (EPC) business provides turnkey services for utility scale & rooftop solar power plants, rural & urban electrification projects, and substations, amongst others. Subsidiary businesses include hospitality and education.

== History ==
Jakson was founded in 1947 as an electrical goods trading company in Delhi, India. It is one of the oldest diesel generator manufacturing companies in India.

The company diversified into solar, EPC and defence businesses in 2010. Jakson has three manufacturing plants across India, in Kathua, Kalsar and Greater Noida. The Kathua and Kalsar plants are dedicated generator manufacturing facilities. The Greater Noida manufacturing plant is a solar module manufacturing facility and manufactures solar modules and solar products.

Jakson is an OEM of Cummins, an American Fortune 500 corporation in India.

In December 2024, Jakson Group partnered with OMC Power for 50 MW solar projects worth 200 cr.

== Notable projects ==
- India's first solar powered train for the Indian Railways
- Roof-top solar power plant at President's Estate, Rashtrapati Bhawan
- Jakson Green will develop a 100 MW grid-connected wind project in Gujarat.
- Jakson Green is involved in a project with NTPC to produce 4G ethanol from flue gas.
