= Ravindra Reddy =

- Born: 24 June 1938; Nellore district
- Died: 21 January 2016 (aged 77)
- Education: Jawaharlal Nehru Technological University, Anantapur
- Alma mater: Indian Institute of Science

P. Ravindra Reddy (24 June 1938 – 21 January 2016) was an Industrialist, pioneer in the indigenization and invention of several critical technologies for India in the fields of Space, Nuclear Power, Defense, Oil, and Gas Exploration, among others. He was the founder Chairman of MTAR Technologies Private Limited and was also Director of the Governing Body of the Antrix Corporation from its inception in 1992 until 2013.

== Early life ==
Ravindra Reddy was born in Alluru village, Madras Presidency, (now in Nellore district, Andhra Pradesh), India. He graduated with a B.E. in 1958 from the College of Engineering, now Jawaharlal Nehru Technological University, Anantapur with specialization in Mechanical Engineering. After his graduation, Ravindra Reddy briefly attended Indian Institute of Science, Bengaluru.

== Career ==
Ravindra Reddy was a leading technologist in the field of precision manufacturing and has made a significant contribution to the indigenous development of several technologies, from multi-stage satellite launch vehicles to achieving self-reliance for India in several areas of Nuclear Power generation, Missile technologies, Oil and Gas exploration among others. After starting his career at HMT, Hyderabad, Reddy became an entrepreneur founding MTAR (Machine Tool Aids and Reconditioning), in Balanagar, Hyderabad, India. As Founder and visionary behind this small machine shop of 10 employees, Ravindra Reddy was instrumental in developing MTAR into a world-class precision Engineering firm that currently employs over 1,200 highly skilled workers across 7 divisions. His Organization manufactures sophisticated Liquid Propulsion Engines/Cryogenic Engine Systems that routinely launch Polar Satellite Launch Vehicles, that powered India's prestigious and pioneering Mars Orbiter Mission Mangalyaan and also PSLV-C37 that successfully launched 104 Satellites in a single flight setting a world record. He was also key to indigenizing many key components used in several Indian Nuclear Power Projects including Prototype Fast Breeder Reactor. Ravindra Reddy's MTAR is recognized as a key private partner in Defence Industry contributing to some important indigenous development of ICBMs such as Agni-V.

Ravindra Reddy's contributions to an important area for India's self-reliance were recognized by Awards such as one presented by Nobel Prize winner Mohamed ElBaradei, Director General IAEA, Vienna, in 2004 at the Indian Nuclear Society, Mumbai, for significant contributions in the nuclear field through innovative technologies and management approaches. He is also a recipient of “Defence Technology Absorption Award" in 2004, in recognition of the outstanding contribution made by the firm in technology absorption in the area of Agni Missiles, presented by the Prime Minister of India, Dr. Manmohan Singh. He was also awarded the “Prof. Y. Nayudamma Memorial Gold Medal” on 25 June 1993 by the Andhra Pradesh Academy of Sciences. Under his stewardship, a 100% EOU Division of MTAR Technologies was started, which currently exports high-value assemblies to technologically advanced countries such as the USA, Israel, and others.

Ravindra Reddy was Chairman and main brain in establishing the Samuha Engineering Industries Limited group Companies promoted for developing Aero Park/Aerospace and Precision Engineering SEZ at Adibatla, Hyderabad. He helped develop the infrastructure and now many industries are operational. He was also a member in Chief Minister Advisory Committee of combined Andhra Pradesh.

He is the Fellow of the Indian National Academy of Engineering. And director of Antrix Corporation, commercial arm of the Indian Space Research Organisation

== Awards ==
Ravindra Reddy has been awarded the following:

- Dr. Yelavarthy Nayudamma Memorial Award- 1993
- INS Industrial Excellence Award 2003
