= Chandanpur =

Chandanpur चन्दनपुर
- Village of Mahankal Rural Municipality
- Location in Nepal
- Coordinates: 27.47°N 85.42°E
- Country: Nepal
- Province: Province No. 3
- District: Lalitpur District

Population (1991)
  - Total: 1,003
- Time zone: UTC+5:45 (Nepal Time)

Chandanpur is a village and former Village Development Committee that is now part of Mahankal Rural Municipality in Province No. 3 of central Nepal. At the time of the 1991 Nepal census it had a population of 1,003 in 160 individual households.
