= Surface Robotics Laboratory-CMERI =

Indian research laboratory

Surface And Field Robotics Laboratory, Central Mechanical Engineering Research Institute, Durgapur
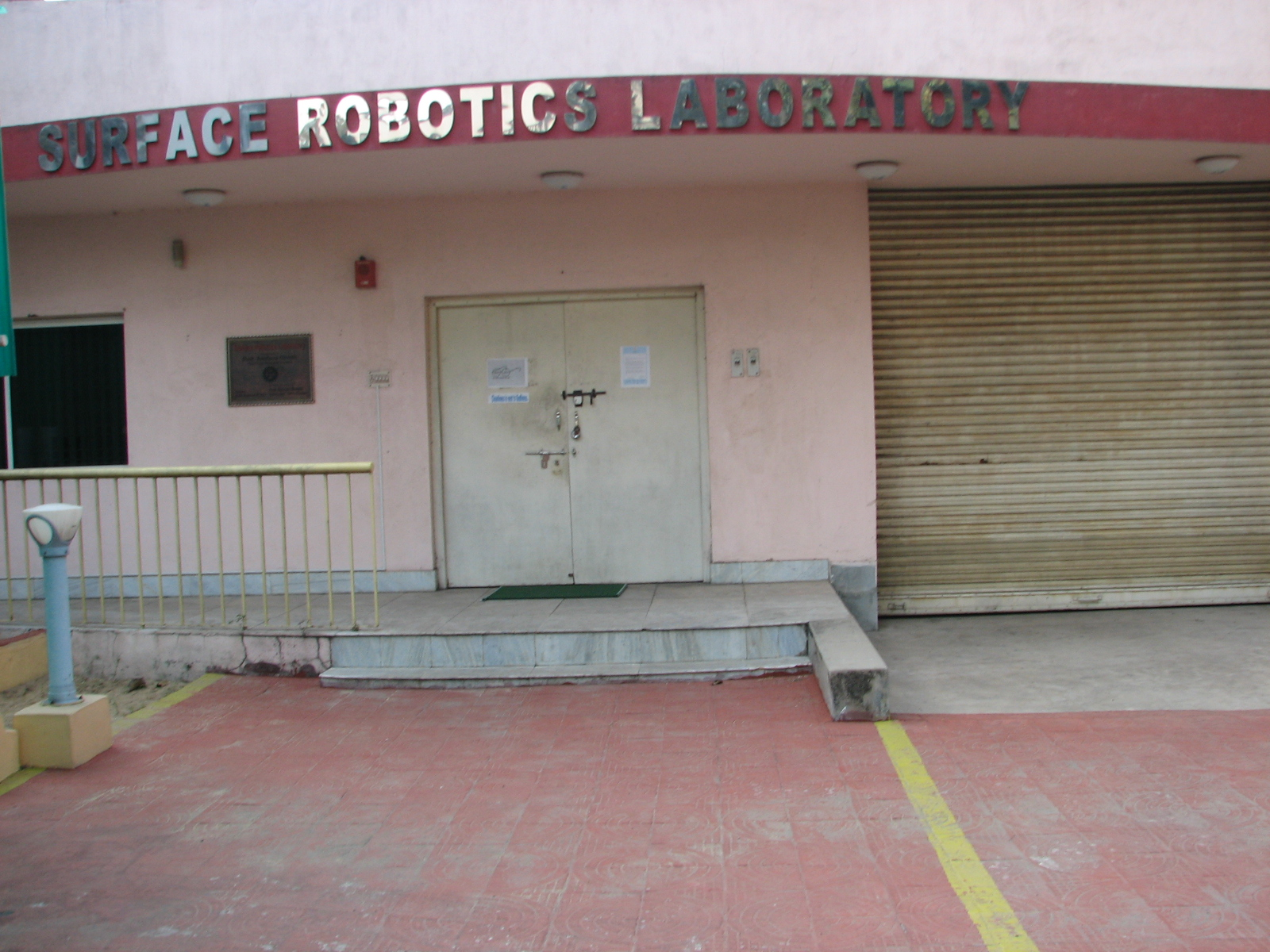
- Surface Robotics Lab
- Motto: यन्त्र मेवास्माकम मंत्र: (yantra mewasmaakam mantra) (Sanskrit)
- Established: 26 February 1958
- Research type: Public Institution
- Field of research: Mobile Robots
- Director: Prof Dr. Harish Hirani
- Head: Sarbari Datta
- Location: MG Avenue, Durgapur-713 209., Durgapur, West Bengal, India
- Affiliations: Council of Scientific and Industrial Research
- Website: http://cmeri.res.in/rnd/srlab/index.htm

Surface Robotics Laboratory (SR Lab) is one of the major R & D Groups in the field of Robotics in Central Mechanical Engineering Research Institute. This group is actively engaged in the development of experimental mobile robots for various unconventional applications.

== Following are the major areas of interest of the group ==
- Mobile robots that can operate various outdoor terrain conditions-commonly termed as "All Terrain robots"
- Aerial Robots
- Robots which use body movement for locomotion
- Amphibious robots which can operate in land, partial & fully submerged terrain

The key element of mobile robotics capability involves:

- Guidance and Navigation
- Command and Control architecture
- Integration and Fusion of multiple sensory information
- Behavior based and Learning System

== Completed Projects ==
All Terranean Robot
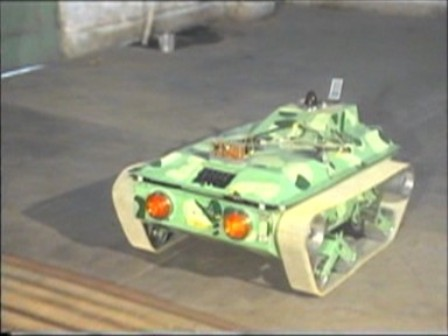
- ATR X50The weight of the robot is 82 kg and its speed is more than 3km/hr. The robot has especially designed infrared sensor owing to which it can detect objects from far off distances.

Sub Terranean Robot
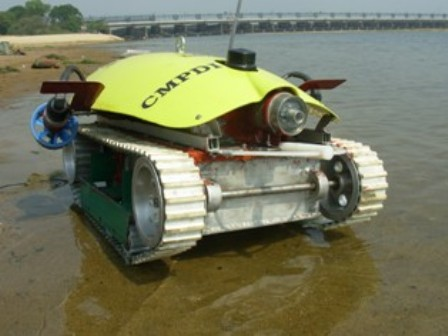
- SR is remotely operated. The remote consists of a laptop in which an application program is used to run it. A wireless modem is attached on the top of the SR for communication between the SR and the laptop.

Modified All Terranean Robot
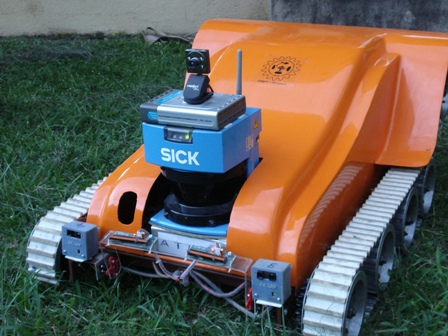
- ATR II is a light weight robot vehicle with greater endurance (than ATR X-50).

Autonomous Intelligent Robotic Wheel Chair (Low End Model)
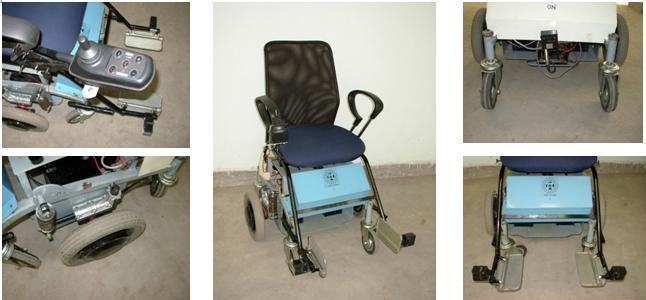
- This version of wheel chair model has motor driven steering control with six wheel configuration.Middle wheel is the drive wheel with two front and two rear spring mounted castors wheel for enhanced mobility and stability.

Autonomous Robotic Wheel Chair (High End Version)
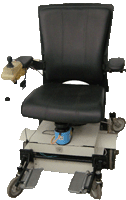
- The basic difference of high end version-II than low end version-I is it incorporates total computer control.

Serpentine Robot
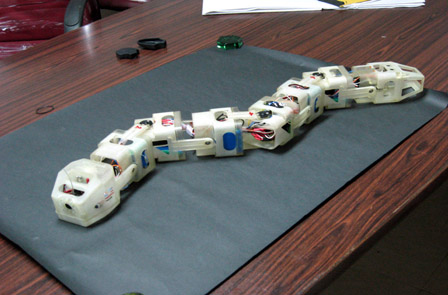
- The robot snake measures 807 mm in length, from head to tail, and is 2-1/2 inches wide.The robot consists of six body segments with one head and one tail module with each segment being powered by an R/C servo.

- All Terrain Robot (ATR X50) is primarily a tracked mobile robot designed & developed to cater the need for strategic requirements of India. This project attempts to analyze a few scientific and technological challenges often encountered by the navigation and robotics research community. The system is capable of operating in hostile environment for intervention, exploration, and data collection. The technology and expertise developed through this project will have many applications.
- Sub Terranean robot has been invented in Surface Robotics Laboratory of CMERI which can move both on land and under water. Its application is to run inside coal mines. It is usually hazardous inside coal mines where deaths often occur owing to accidents inside mines. Hence instead of human beings, this robot may be used inside mines so that there is no chance of life risk even if an accident occurs under the mines. SR is remotely operated. The remote consists of a laptop in which an application program is used to run it. A wireless modem is attached on the top of the SR for communication between the SR and the laptop.
- Autonomous robot on intelligent behaviour is entirely designed and built in Surface Robotics Laboratory of CMERI.The purpose of this robot is to gather intelligence and the information namely for searching, scanning, detecting, recording and surveillance. The project is mainly based on microcontroller and sensors.
- Modified All Terranean Robot also known as ATR II has been designed & developed in Surface Robotics Laboratory of CMERI. From the need of introducing mobile robot technology in India, the project All Terrain Robot (ATR) was taken up.
- The main objective of Autonomous Intelligent Robotic Wheel Chair is to design and develop the technology to provide comfort, independence of mobility & utilize the advantage of robotics technology for physically challenged persons.
- Outdoor mobile robot was proposed for explosive detection capability with autonomous navigation on rough terrain. It is a four-wheel drive system with tracked configuration. The four separate drive units are constructed by means of a motor, bevel gears, sprocket-chain and wheels. The drive unit drives the ground wheel by means of a roller chain. The whole load of the system is distributed on three ground wheels.
- Serpentine robot that is being built is a biologically inspired robot and has got its inspiration from the snake and its method of locomotion. The robot snake measures 807 mm in length, from head to tail, and is 2 1/2 inches wide. The robot consists of six body segments with one head and one tail module with each segment being powered by an R/C servo. The segments alternate in orientation so that the first segment moves in horizontal motion and the next segment moves in vertical motion. The sequence repeats itself for all six segments and a head. This gives the snake enough flexibility to move its body in a number of different ways in order to achieve locomotion, in much the same way as a biological snake.

== Video gallery ==
Serpentine Robot on water

Outdoor Mobile Robot

All Terranean Robot

Autonomous Intelligent Robotic Wheel Chair

Serpentine Robot
