= PTC Industries Limited =

Indian manufacturing company

- Type: Public
- Traded as: BSE: 539006; NSE: PTCIL
- Industry: Aerospace, Manufacturing
- Founded: 1963; 63 years ago
- Founder: Satish Agarwal
- Headquarters: Lucknow, Uttar Pradesh, India
- Area served: Worldwide
- Key people: Sachin Agarwal (Chairman and Managing Director)
- Products: Titanium, Tungsten, Cobalt, Nickel and superalloy materials, precision castings, engineered components
- Subsidiaries: Aerolloy Technologies Limited
- Website: www.ptcil.com

PTC Industries Limited is an Indian manufacturing company founded in 1963 as Precision Tools & Castings Private Limited and headquartered in Lucknow, Uttar Pradesh. Apart from manufacturing cast components in stainless steel and higher alloys like duplex and super-duplex, it produces titanium, tungsten, cobalt and superalloy materials and castings for applications in aerospace, defence and industrial sectors.

== History ==
=== Founding and early development ===
PTC Industries was incorporated in 1963 as Precision Tools and Castings. The company started production as an investment casting foundry producing metal parts for industrial applications.

=== Technology development ===
PTC Industries creates casts and specialised products from stainless steel and high-alloys melted into moulds, and has been doing so for 51 years. The company manufactures industrial castings of various grades of steel/stainless steel and super alloys viz. Cobalt/Nickel/Tungston based metallurgy. In 1998, the company licensed the Replicast process from Castings Technology International (CTI), a United Kingdom-based research organisation.

Later, PTC Industries independently developed RapidCAST, a casting process for large and complex components, and expanded into ceramic moulding for single-piece castings. During this period, PTC's industrial customers included Rolls-Royce, Metso, Siemens and Flowserve.

In 2014, Forbes India included the company in its list of "Hidden Gems", a group of fast-growing Indian companies.

=== Expansion into aerospace manufacturing ===
PTC Industries announced that it has successfully completed the acquisition of the Electron Beam Cold Hearth Remelting (EBCHR) furnace with a capacity of 5,000 tonnes per annum, through its wholly owned subsidiary Aerolloy Technologies Limited (ATL)'s Design division from Germany's ALD Vacuum Technologies. In 2017, PTC Industries established a titanium casting facility at its Advanced Manufacturing Technology Centre in Lucknow, with technical collaboration from CTI.

The company manufactures titanium and superalloy materials and precision components for aerospace applications.

=== Strategic Materials Technology Complex ===
In May 2025, India's Defence Minister Rajnath Singh inaugurated the titanium and superalloy materials plant at the Strategic Materials Technology Complex (SMTC) in the Lucknow node of the Uttar Pradesh Defence Industrial Corridor. The facility spans approximately 50 acres and produces titanium and superalloy materials.

Advanced metallurgical technologies including Vacuum Arc Remelting (VAR), Plasma Arc Melting (PAM), Electron Beam (EB) melting, and Vacuum Induction Melting (VIM) are being commissioned at this plant.

In 2026, TIME and Statista included PTC Industries among India's fastest-growing companies.

== Operations and customers ==
The company supplies its products to international customers including Safran, Dassault Aviation, BAE Systems, and Israel Aerospace Industries.

== Subsidiary ==
Aerolloy Technologies Limited is a wholly owned subsidiary of PTC Industries that manufactures titanium and superalloy materials and components.

In 2024, PTC Industries acquired UK-based Trac Precision Solutions, a manufacturer of aerospace components.

== See also ==
- Uttar Pradesh Defence Industrial Corridor
- Defence Metallurgical Research Laboratory
- Mishra Dhatu Nigam
- Make in India
- Titanium alloy
- Investment casting
