= Academy of Scientific and Innovative Research =

Institute based at Ghaziabad, Uttar Pradesh, India

- Type: Public Research Institute
- Established: 2010; 16 years ago
- Academic affiliations: ACU
- Budget: ₹2,192.51 crore (US$227.7 million) (2023–24)
- Chairperson: Padmanabhan Balaram
- Director: Manoj Kumar Dhar
- Faculty: 1,426 (2025)
- Students: 5,562 (2025)
- Postgraduates: 301 (2025)
- Doctoral students: 5,261 (2025)
- Location: Ghaziabad, Uttar Pradesh, India; 28°41′17″N 77°27′55″E
- Campus: Urban
- Nickname: AcSIR
- Website: acsir.res.in

The Academy of Scientific and Innovative Research (AcSIR) is an Indian institute of national importance, headquartered at the CSIR-Human Resource Development Centre Campus, Ghaziabad, Uttar Pradesh. The institute was established for the purpose of granting doctoral and post-doctoral degrees.

The establishment of the academy allowed for a centralised institution to manage this research and was enabled by legislation of the Lok Sabha in 2010. This same legislation labelled the Academy as an "Institute of National Importance".

The academy was established in 2010 by a resolution of the Government of India on 17 June 2010 and the Academy of Scientific and Innovative Research Act, 2011 notified on 3 April 2012, as an 'Institution of National Importance', with an aim of furtherance of advancement of learning and research in the fields of science and technology and their interfaces in association with Council of Scientific and Industrial Research.
