= Maltese cross (disambiguation) =

The Maltese cross is the symbol of an order of Christian warriors known as the Knights Hospitaller or Knights of Malta.

Maltese cross may also refer to:

- "Maltese Cross" (Law & Order: Criminal Intent episode), an episode of the television show Law & Order: Criminal Intent
- Maltese cross (plant) Lychnis chalcedonica, a species of flowering plant
- Maltese Cross mechanism, a mechanism that translates a continuous rotation into an intermittent rotary motion
- Maltese cross (optics), a pattern of four dark cones encountered in polarized light microscopy
- An experiment in a Crookes tube first performed by Juliusz Plücker
- A move performed on gymnastics rings
- Theodore Roosevelt's Maltese Cross Cabin, a cabin used by Theodore Roosevelt
- Maltese Cross is a domino game
- Fatty casts found in urine during nephrotic syndrome

== See also ==
- Maltese cross medusa Lucernariopsis cruxmelitensis, a stalked jellyfish
- Malta (disambiguation)
