= Rupak Raj Sharma =

Nepali footballer and FIFA referee

Personal information
- Date of birth: 23 January 1954
- Place of birth: Nepal
- Date of death: 28 September 1992 (aged 38)
- Place of death: Bhattedanda, Nepal
- Position: Midfielder

Senior career*
Years	Team	Apps	(Gls)
- Boys Union Club
- Shree Panch Mahendra Club

International career
1972–1985	Nepal		
- * Club domestic league appearances and goals

Rupak Raj Sharma (Nepali: रुपकराज शर्मा; 23 January 1954 – 28 September 1992) was a Nepali footballer who played as midfielder, and FIFA referee. Sharma played for the Nepal national football team from 1972 to 1985, and was a member of the FIFA refereeing panel from 1986 until 1992, when he died as result of the PIA Flight 268 crash.

== Club career ==
Sharma made his domestic football debut with Boys Union Club. He also played for Shree Panch Mahendra Club. He had joined Nepal Police from 1975 and was holding the post of Superintendent of Police the time until his eventual death.

== International career ==
Sharma played for the Nepal national football team from 1972 until 1985, and captained the national side for 11 years since 1974.

== Refereeing career ==
After retiring as player, Sharma turned to refereeing, becoming the first Nepali to get a FIFA referee license in 1986.

== Death ==
Sharma acted as the head referee of the match between Pakistani club Wohaib and Club Valencia from Maldives in the return leg of the 1992–93 Asian Club Championship held at the Railway Stadium in Lahore on 27 September 1992. The next day, upon on the way home from Pakistan after the match, Sharma died along with the other three assistant referees of the match, Shyam Shrestha, Roshan Kumar Shrestha and Hira Ratna Bajracharya, in the PIA Flight 268 crash which crashed in the Bhattedanda, Nepal.

== Legacy ==
During his playing years, Rupak Raj Sharma received the Best Player award in 1981. He was also awarded with the prestigious Order of Gorkha Dakshina Bahu.

After his death, an organisation named Rupak Memorial Foundation was formed in Nepal to tribute Sharma along with the other passengers. The All Nepal Football Association also set up an annual award called Rupak Memorial Award, which has been honouring football personalities in memory of his name.

In 2013, the Nepal Post issued six new postage stamps honouring five different Nepali personalities including Sharma.

In September 2017, Rupak Memorial Foundation organised a cycle ride to mark the 25th anniversary of the plane crash in Lele.
