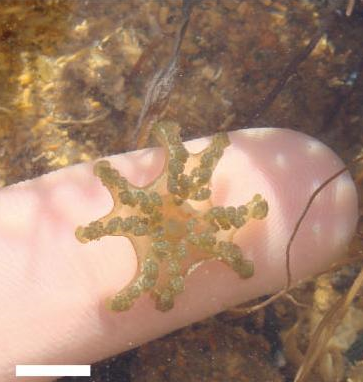
- Calvadosia corbini

Scientific classification
- Domain: Eukaryota
- Kingdom: Animalia
- Phylum: Cnidaria
- Class: Staurozoa
- Order: Stauromedusae
- Suborder: Amyostaurida; Miranda, Hirano, Mills, Falconer, Fenwick, Marques & Collins, 2016

Families
- Craterolophidae; Kishinouyeidae

= Amyostaurida =

Suborder of jellyfishes

Amyostaurida is a suborder of jellyfishes. It contains two families.
