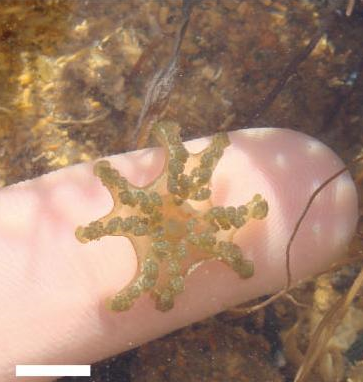
- Calvadosia corbini

Scientific classification
- Kingdom: Animalia
- Phylum: Cnidaria
- Class: Staurozoa
- Order: Stauromedusae
- Suborder: Amyostaurida
- Family: Kishinouyeidae; Uchida, 1929
- Genus: Calvadosia; James-Clark, 1863

Synonyms
- Kishinouyea Mayer, 1910; Lucernariopsis Uchida, 1929; Sasakiella Okubo, 1917; Schizodiscus Kishinouye, 1902

= Calvadosia =

Genus of jellyfishes

Calvadosia is a genus of stalked jellyfish in the order Stauromedusae. It is the only genus in the monotypic family Kishinouyeidae.

== Taxonomy and systematics ==
The family name is a tribute to Japanese cnidariologist Kamakichi Kishinouye. Mayer used the synonym Kishinouyea as a replacement name of Schizodiscus, for homonymy, as the name was already used to describe a lichen genus. Kishinouyea was also used by Yoshio Ôuchi to describe a praying mantis genus that he quickly renamed Kishinouyeum in 1938, and that could be a junior synonym for Phyllothelys.

=== Species ===
The following species are recognized in the genus Calvadosia:

- Calvadosia campanulata (Lamouroux, 1815)
- Calvadosia capensis (Carlgren, 1938)
- Calvadosia corbini (Larson, 1980)
- Calvadosia cruciformis (Okubo, 1917)
- Calvadosia cruxmelitensis (Corbin, 1978)
- Calvadosia hawaiiensis (Edmondson, 1930)
- Calvadosia lewisi Miranda, Branch, Collins, Hirano, Marques & Griffiths, 2017
- Calvadosia tasmaniensis (Zagal, Hirano, Mills, Edgar & Barrett, 2011)
- Calvadosia tsingtaoensis (Ling, 1937)
- Calvadosia vanhoeffeni (Browne, 1910)
