= Spherulite (polymer physics) =

Spherical regions inside a polymer

In polymer physics, spherulites (from Greek sphaira = ball and lithos = stone) are spherical semicrystalline regions inside non-branched linear polymers. Their formation is associated with crystallization of polymers from the melt and is controlled by several parameters such as the number of nucleation sites, structure of the polymer molecules, cooling rate, etc. Depending on those parameters, spherulite diameter may vary in a wide range from a few micrometers to millimeters. Spherulites are composed of highly ordered lamellae, which result in higher density, hardness, but also brittleness when compared to disordered regions in a polymer. The lamellae are connected by amorphous regions which provide elasticity and impact resistance. Alignment of the polymer molecules within the lamellae results in birefringence producing a variety of colored patterns, including a Maltese cross, when spherulites are viewed between crossed polarizers in an optical microscope.

== Formation ==
Principle of lamellae formation during the crystallization of polymers. Arrow shows the direction of temperature gradient.

If a molten linear polymer (such as polyethylene) is cooled down rapidly, then the orientation of its molecules, which are randomly aligned, curved and entangled remain frozen and the solid has disordered structure. However, upon slow cooling, some polymer chains take on a certain orderly configuration: they align themselves in plates called crystalline lamellae.

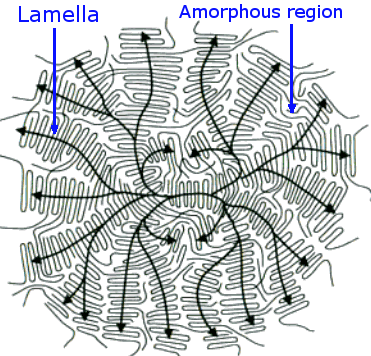
Schematic model of a spherulite. Black arrows indicate direction of molecular alignment

Growth from the melt would follow the temperature gradient (see figure). For example, if the gradient is directed normal to the direction of molecular alignment then the lamella growth sideward into a planar crystallite. However, in absence of thermal gradient, growth occurs radially, in all directions resulting in spherical aggregates, that is spherulites. The largest surfaces of the lamellae are terminated by molecular bends and kinks, and growth in this direction results in disordered regions. Therefore, spherulites have semicrystalline structure where highly ordered lamellae plates are interrupted by amorphous regions.

The size of spherulites varies in a wide range, from micrometers up to 8 centimeter and is controlled by the nucleation. Strong supercooling or intentional addition of crystallization seeds results in relatively large number of nucleation sites; then spherulites are numerous and small and interact with each other upon growth. In case of fewer nucleation sites and slow cooling, a few larger spherulites are created.

The seeds can be induced by impurities, plasticizers, fillers, dyes and other substances added to improve other properties of the polymer. This effect is poorly understood and irregular, so that the same additive can promote nucleation in one polymer, but not in another. Many of the good nucleating agents are metal salts of organic acids, which themselves are crystalline at the solidification temperature of the polymer solidification.

== Properties ==
=== Mechanical ===
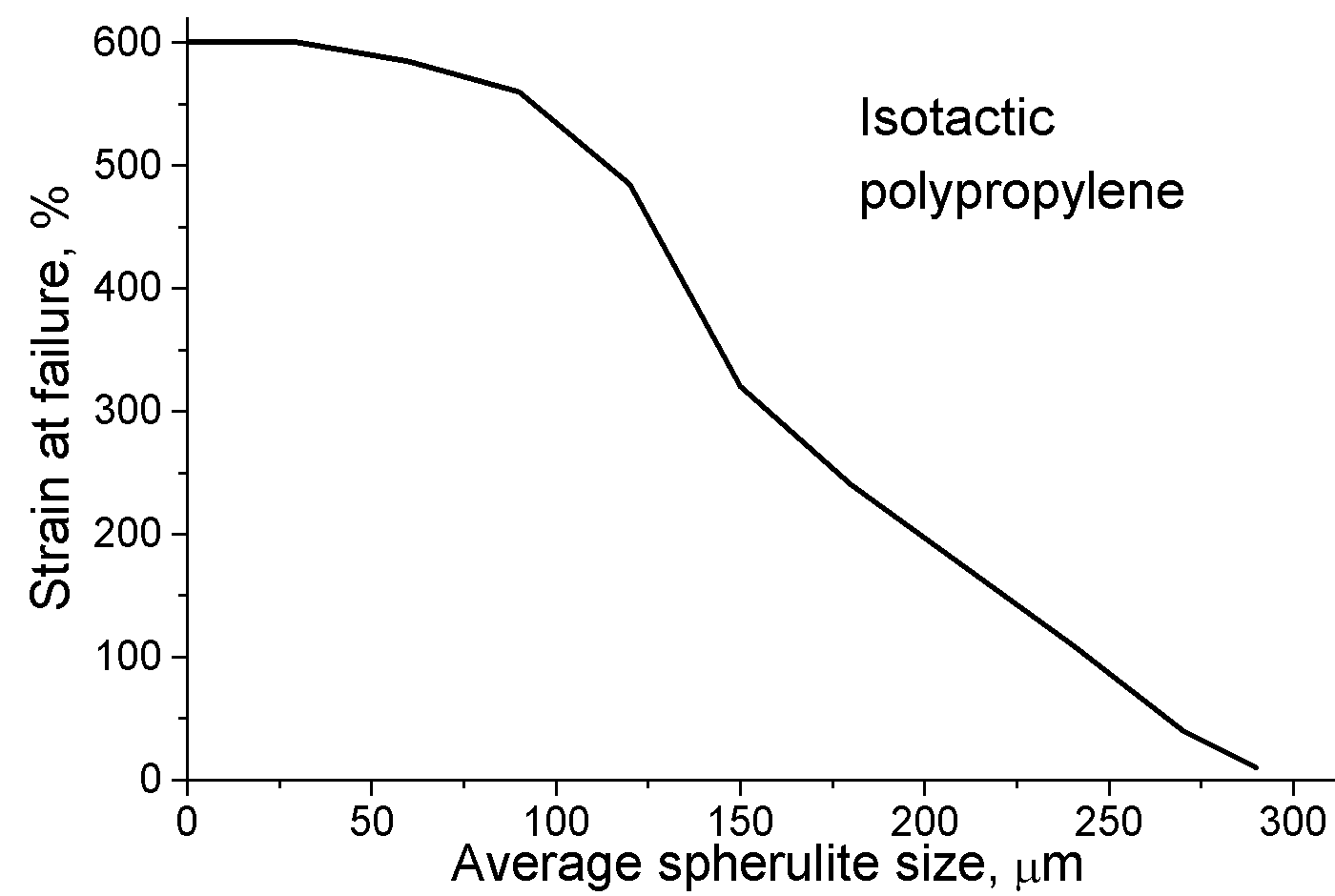
Strain at failure vs. spherulite size.

Formation of spherulites affects many properties of the polymer material; in particular, crystallinity, density, tensile strength and Young's modulus of polymers increase during spherulization. This increase is due to the lamellae fraction within the spherulites, where the molecules are more densely packed than in the amorphous phase. Stronger intermolecular interaction within the lamellae accounts for increased hardness, but also for higher brittleness. On the other hand, the amorphous regions between the lamellae within the spherulites give the material certain elasticity and impact resistance.

Changes in mechanical properties of polymers upon formation of spherulites however strongly depend on the size and density of the spherulites. A representative example is shown in the figure demonstrating that the strain at failure rapidly decreases with the increase in the spherulite size and thus with the decrease in their number in isotactic polypropylene. Similar trends are observed for tensile strength, yield stress and toughness. Increase in the total volume of the spherulites results in their interaction as well as shrinkage of the polymer, which becomes brittle and easily cracks under load along the boundaries between the spherulites.

=== Optical ===
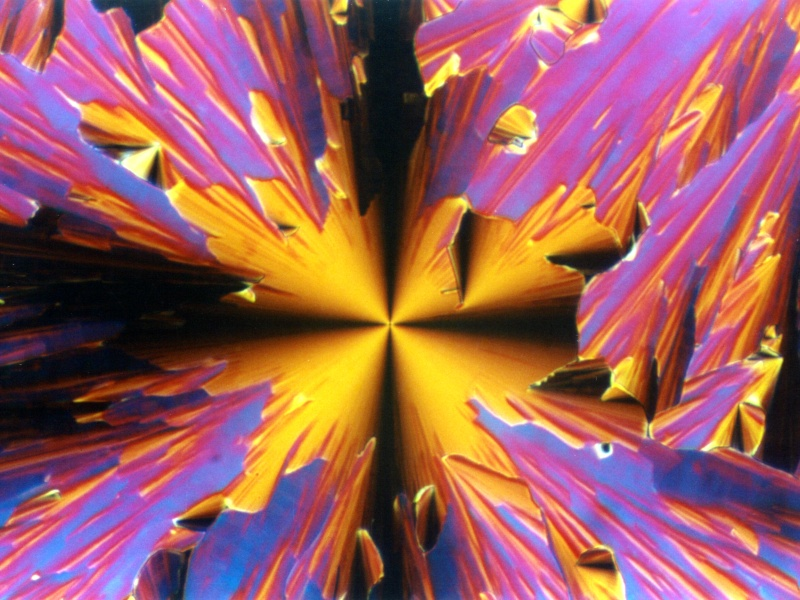
A spherulite embedded into a mosaic mesogen viewed between crossed polarizers.

Alignment of the polymer molecules within the lamellae results in birefringence producing a variety of colored patterns when spherulites are viewed between crossed polarizers in an optical microscope. In particular, the so-called "Maltese cross" is often present which consists of four dark perpendicular cones diverging from the origin (see right picture), sometimes with a bright center (front picture). Its formation can be explained as follows. Linear polymer chains can be regarded as a linear polarizers. If their direction coincides with that of one of the crossed polarizers then little light is transmitted; the transmission is increased when the chains make a non-zero angle with both polarizers, and the induced transmittance is dependent on the wavelength, partly because of the absorption properties of the polymer.

A schematic of Maltese cross formation

This effect results in the dark perpendicular cones (Maltese cross) and colored brighter regions in between them in the front and right pictures. It reveals that the molecular axis of the polymer molecules in the spherules is either normal or perpendicular to the radius vector, i.e. molecular orientation is uniform when going along a line from the spherulite center to its edge along its radius. However, this orientation changes with rotation angle. The pattern may be different (bright or dark) for the center of the spherulites indicating misorientation of the molecules in the nucleation seeds of individual spherulites. Any dark or light spots are dependent on the angle made with the polarizer, which results in a symmetrical image due to the spherical shape.

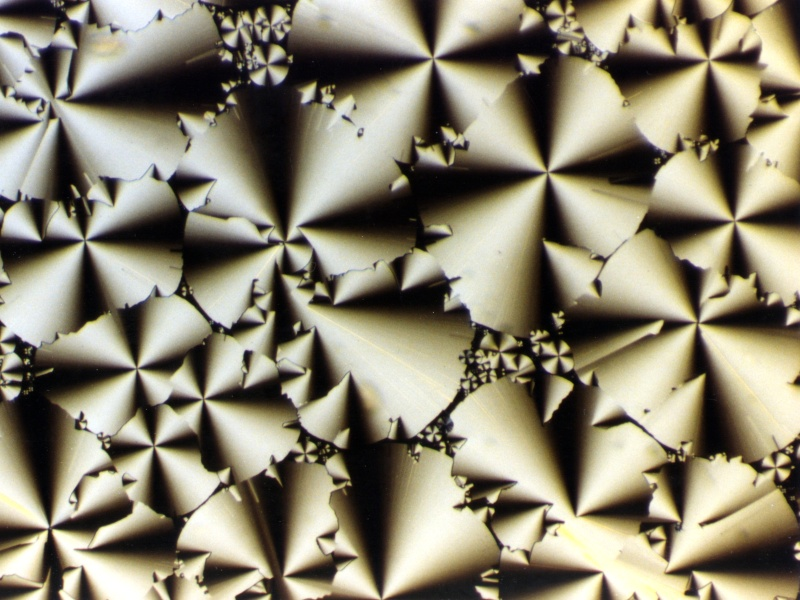
Spherulites embedded into a mosaic mesogen viewed between crossed polarizers.

When spherulites were rotated in their plane, the corresponding Maltese cross patterns did not change, indicating that the molecular arrangement is homogeneous versus the polar angle. From the birefringence point of view, spherulites can be positive or negative. This distinction depends not on the orientation of the molecules (parallel or perpendicular to the radial direction) but to the orientation of the major refractive index of the molecule relative to the radial vector. The spherulite polarity depends on the constituent molecules, but it can also change with temperature.

== See also ==
- Crystallization of polymers

== Bibliography ==
- G. W. Ehrenstein; Richard P. Theriault (2001). Polymeric materials: structure, properties, applications. Hanser Verlag. ISBN 1-56990-310-7.
