= Kamakichi Kishinouye =

Japanese fisheries biologist and cnidariologist

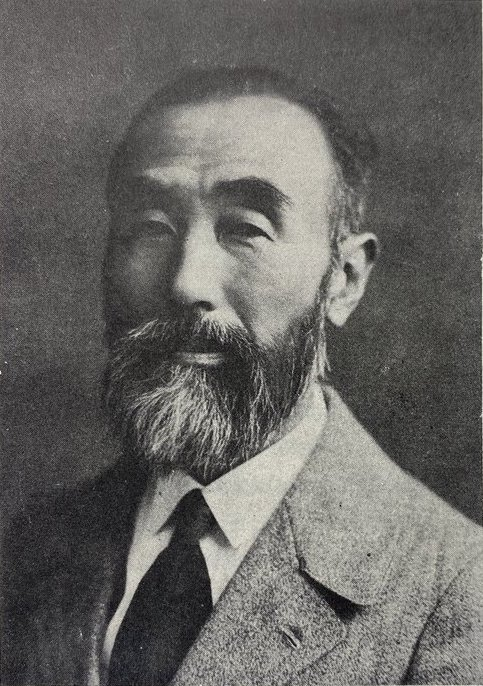
- Born: 29 November 1867; Tōkai, Aichi, Owari Domain, Tokugawa Shogunate
- Died: 22 November 1929 (aged 61); Sichuan, Republic of China
- Scientific career
- Fields: Marine biology, Cnidariology
- Workplaces: Imperial University of Tokyo (Faculty of Agriculture)

Kamakichi Kishinouye (岸上 鎌吉, Kishinoue Kamakichi; 29 November 1867 – 22 November 1929) was a Japanese fisheries biologist and cnidariologist and a professor of the Imperial University of Tokyo (Faculty of Agriculture) between 1908 and 1928. Kishinouye died in Chengdu of a sudden illness while on a collecting expedition to China.

Kishinouye recommended Kumataro Ito to Hugh M. Smith as an artist on board the U.S. Bureau of Fisheries Steamer U.S.S. Albatross during the Philippine Expedition from 1907 to 1910.

== Publications ==
- Contributions to the comparative study of the so-called scombroid fishes. (1923) Tokyo : Imperial University of Tokyo, - Journal of the College of Agriculture; volume viii, no. 3 ii, p. 293-475
- Larval and juvenile tunas and skipjacks. (1919)
- A Study of the Mackerels, Cybiids, and Tunas. (1915) Special Scientific Report - Fisheries, no. 24.
- Prehistoric fishing in Japan. (1911) J. Coll. Agriculture, Imp. Univ. Tokyo, 2;328-382.
- Some Medusae of Japanese Waters. (1910)
- Some New Scyphomedusae of Japan. (1902)
- Note on the Eyes of Cardium Muticum Reeve. (1894)
- Note on the Coelomic Cavity of the Spider. (1894)
- On the Development of Limulus Longispina. (1893)
- On the Lasteral Eyes of the Spiders. (1893)
- On the Development of Araneina. (1891)

== Tributes ==
He gave his name to the jellyfish genus Kishinouyea Mayer, 1910, with a preoccupied name. Kishinouyea has been also used by Yoshio Ôuchi to describe a praying mantis genus that he quickly renamed Kishinouyeum in 1938, and that could be a junior synonym for Phyllothelys.

Kishinoella (with species Kishinoella rara (Kishinouye, 1915) and Kishinoella tonggol (Bleeker, 1851)) is a synonym genus name to describe Thunnus tonggol (Bleeker, 1851) (accepted name).

The epithet kishinouyei is used to refer to Kamakichi Kishinouye in species names.

The American ichthyologist John Otterbein Snyder honoured him in the name of the gurnard Lepidotrigla kishinouyi, although he left the e out for phonetic reasons.

== See also ==
Media related to Kamakichi Kishinouye at Wikimedia Commons

- Category:Taxa named by Kamakichi Kishinouye
