= Lepidotrigla argus =

Scientific classification
- Kingdom: Animalia
- Phylum: Chordata
- Class: Actinopterygii
- Order: Perciformes
- Family: Triglidae
- Genus: Lepidotrigla
- Species: L. argus

Binomial name
- Lepidotrigla argus Ogilby, 1910

Species of fish

Lepidotrigla argus, the long-finned sea gurnard or eye gurnard, is a species of marine, demersal ray-finned fish from the family Triglidae, the gurnards and sea robins. It is found in the Indo-West Pacific Ocean.

== Taxonomy ==
Lepidotrigla argus was first formally described in 1910 by the Irish born Australian herpetologist and ichthyologist James Douglas Ogilby with its type localities given as between South Hill and Cape Gloucester in Queensland and Cape Bryon in New South Wales. The specific name argus refers to Argus, the mythical hundred-eyed giant who was the guardian of Io, after his death his many eyes were changed into the feathers of a peacock, thought to be a reference to the vivid red or orange spot on the first dorsal fin.

== Description ==
Lepidotrigla argus attains a maximum published length of 18 cm (7.1 in). There is a bright red or orange spot on the first dorsal fin.

== Distribution and habitat ==
Lepidotrigla argus is endemic to Australia where it is found from the Houtman Abrolhos Islands to Rowley Shoals in Western Australia and from Cape York south to off Disaster Bay, New South Wales, and has been reported from Papua New Guinea. This is a benthic species of the continental shelf, living on soft substrates at depths between 24 and 172 m (79 and 564 ft).

== Biology ==
Lepidotrigla argus has an estimated longevity of more than 6 years and the mean length at which sexual maturity was reached is 13.1 cm (5.2 in) in females and 13.5 cm (5.3 in) in males. Studies on the gonads of captured fishes suggested that long-fiined gurnards spawn in all months, however the recruitment of new individuals into the population occurs periodically. Juveniles settle into shallow nursery areas at depths between 30 and 60 m (98 and 197 ft) and when they are sexually mature they move into deeper waters between 60 and 90 m (200 and 300 ft).
