= Bagmati Rural Municipality, Lalitpur =

Rural Municipality in Bagmati Province, Nepal

Bagmati Rural Municipality बागमती गाउँपालिका
- Rural Municipality
- Nickname: Bagmati
- Location in Nepal Bagmati Rural Municipality (Nepal)
- Country: Nepal
- Province: Bagmati Province
- District: Lalitpur District
- Established: March 2017

Government
  - Chairperson: Bir Bahadur Lopchan (Nepali Congress)
  - Vice Chairperson: Bhakta Bahadur Darlami Magar (Nishan)

Area
  - Total: 111.49 km^{2} (43.05 sq mi)

Population (2011 Nepal census)
  - Total: 13,049
  - Density: 117.04/km^{2} (303.1/sq mi)
- Website: http://bagmatimunlalitpur.gov.np/

Bagmati is a Rural Municipality in Lalitpur District in Bagmati Province of Nepal that was established in 2017 by merging the former Village development committees Ashrang, Ghusel, Malta, Bhattedanda, Pyutar, Ikudol and Gimdi in March 2017. The center of this rural municipality is located in Old-Bhattedanda.

== Demographics ==
At the time of the 2011 Nepal census, Bagmati Rural Municipality had a population of 13,049. Of these, 58.3% spoke Tamang, 40.2% Nepali, 0.9% Magar, 0.2% Maithili, 0.1% Bhojpuri and 0.3% other languages as their first language.

In terms of ethnicity/caste, 58.6% were Tamang, 23.2% Hill Brahmin, 7.3% Chhetri, 5.9% Magar, 1.9% Kami, 1.4% Ghale, 0.5% Damai/Dholi, 0.3% Brahmu/Baramo, 0.2% other Dalit, 0.2% Newar, 0.1% other Terai and 0.4% others.

In terms of religion, 59.3% were Buddhist, 39.5% Hindu, 1.1% Christian and 0.1% others.

In terms of literacy, 69.0% could read and write, 2.1% could only read and 28.8% could neither read nor write.
