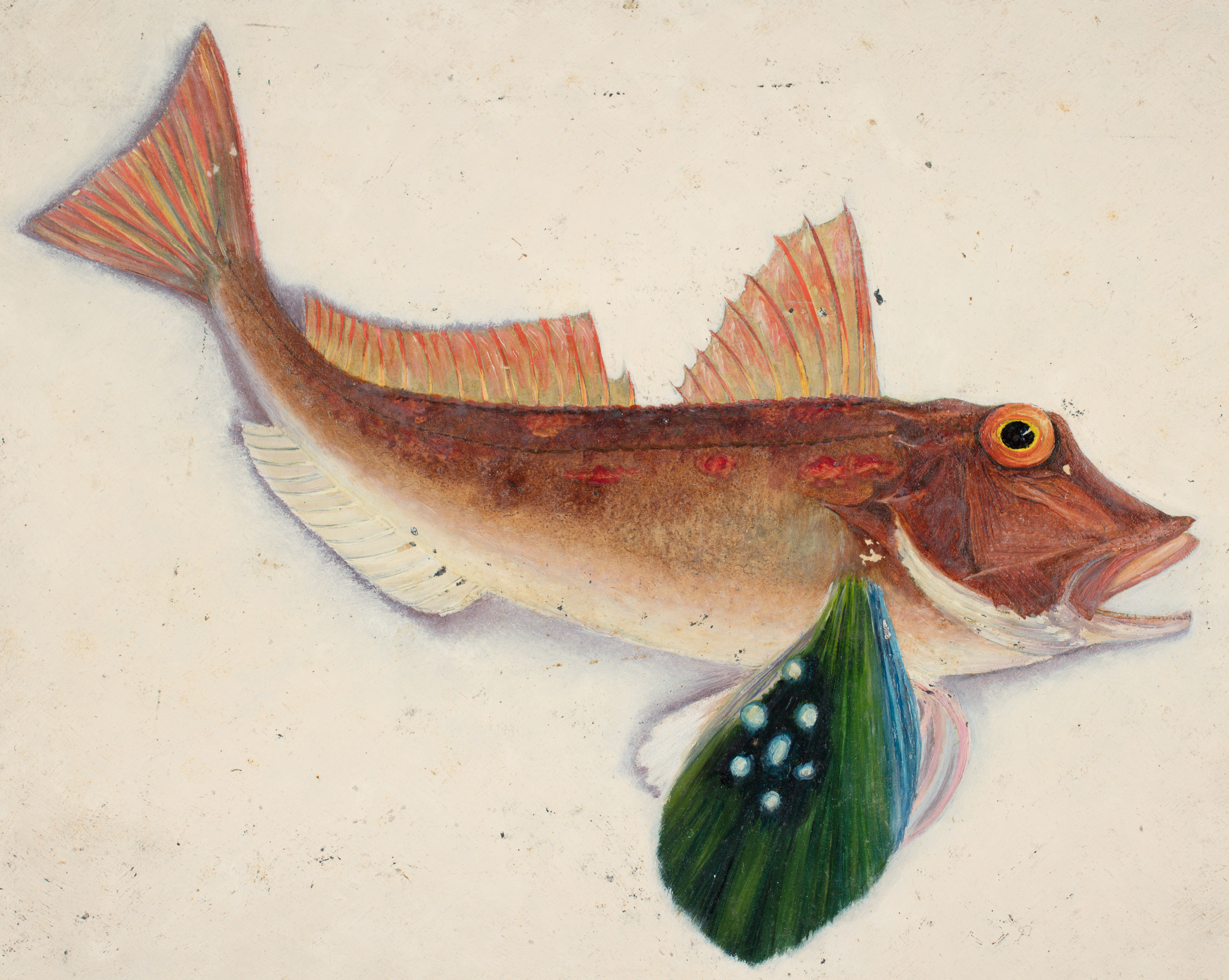
- painting by Griffin, L. T., Auckland Museum

Scientific classification
- Kingdom: Animalia
- Phylum: Chordata
- Class: Actinopterygii
- Order: Perciformes
- Family: Triglidae
- Genus: Lepidotrigla
- Species: L. brachyoptera

Binomial name
- Lepidotrigla brachyoptera F. W. Hutton, 1872

= Scaly gurnard =

Species of fish

The scaly gurnard (Lepidotrigla brachyoptera) is a species of marine, demersal ray-finned fish from the family Triglidae, the gurnards and sea robins. It is found in the south-western Pacific Ocean.

== Taxonomy ==
The scaly gurnard was first formally described in 1872 by the English-born New Zealand scientist Frederick Wollaston Hutton with its type locality given as Wellington Harbour. The specific name brachyoptera is a compound of brachys, meaning "short", and ptera, which means "finned", thought to be an allusion to the shorter pectoral fin filaments in comparison to other then described species from the genus Lepidotrigla.

== Description ==
The scaly gurnard has a body which is covered with large scales that are firmly attached to the skin. There are 10 to 12 scale rows from the lateral line the origin of the anal fin. The upper head and body are reddish with darker mottles, the flanks and lower body are silvery white. There is a dark red blotch on the first dorsal fin, The caudal fin has a wide dark red bar between white bars. It is thought that the colours of the pectoral fins are probably sexually dimorphic. This species attains a maximum total length of around 20 cm (7.9 in).

== Distribution and habitat ==
The scaly gurnard is endemic to New Zealand where it occurs from Cape Reinga on North Island south to Stewart Island and east to the shallower areas of the western Chatham Rise and Chatham Island. The species was reported from the Kermadec Islands but this has proven to be the closely related L. robinsi which was described in 1997. This is a demersal fish which is found at depths between 26 and 234 m (85 and 768 ft). It was sighted and photographed in the type locality of Wellington Harbour in January 2023.
