= Kumataro Ito =

Japanese illustrator

Kumataro Ito (Japanese: 伊藤熊太郎 Ito Kumataro; c. 1860 – c. 1930) was the illustrator on board the U.S. Bureau of Fisheries Steamer U.S.S. Albatross during the Philippine Expedition from 1907 to 1910.

Ito was probably recommended to Hugh M. Smith as an artist by Kamakichi Kishinouye, a Japanese ichthyologist and cnidariologist.
