= Ghusel =

Ghusel घुसेल kuh-shyahl
- Village of Bagmati Rural Municipality
- Location in Nepal
- Coordinates: 27.55°N 85.26°E
- Country: Nepal
- Province: Bagmati Province
- District: Lalitpur District

Population (2011)
  - Total: 1,510
- Time zone: UTC+5:45 (Nepal Time)
- Postal code: 44700
- Area code: 01

Ghusel (Nepali: घुसेल) is a village and former Village Development Committee that is now part of Bagmati Rural Municipality in Bagmati Province of central Nepal. It is located southern part of Kathmandu Valley at similar or less heights. At the time of the 2011 Nepal census it had a population of 1510 in 308 individual households, down from the time of the 1991 Nepal census when it had a population of 1715 in 294 individual households.

== Record of 1994 ==
Over the past decade, Ghusel VDC, Lalitpur District has moved from primarily subsistence agriculture into the wider cash economy aided by the Small Farmers' Development Program (SFDP), which provides credit to farmers mainly for the purchase of buffalo for milk production, and by the National Dairy Corporation, which supports local dairy cooperatives. Analysis reveals that buffalo-keeping and milk sales are increasing the well-being of many households, while at the same time creating new inequalities in gender roles and responsibilities, greater inequities between Brahmin and Tamang residents in Ghusel, and placing pressures on the ecosystem for increased supplies of fodder and fuelwood. Evidence suggests that there is critical, need for attention to the social, and particularly gender-based, implications of maintaining livestock for milk sales and to the ecological underpinnings of this livelihood system.

== Education ==
Shree Ghusel Secondary School is only secondary school in village which was established in 1960 (2017 BS) as primary school. The school is located at almost center part of village at Mane Danda. "Mane" is a monastery or religious Stupa for Buddhist people. The name of area is taken from this word.
