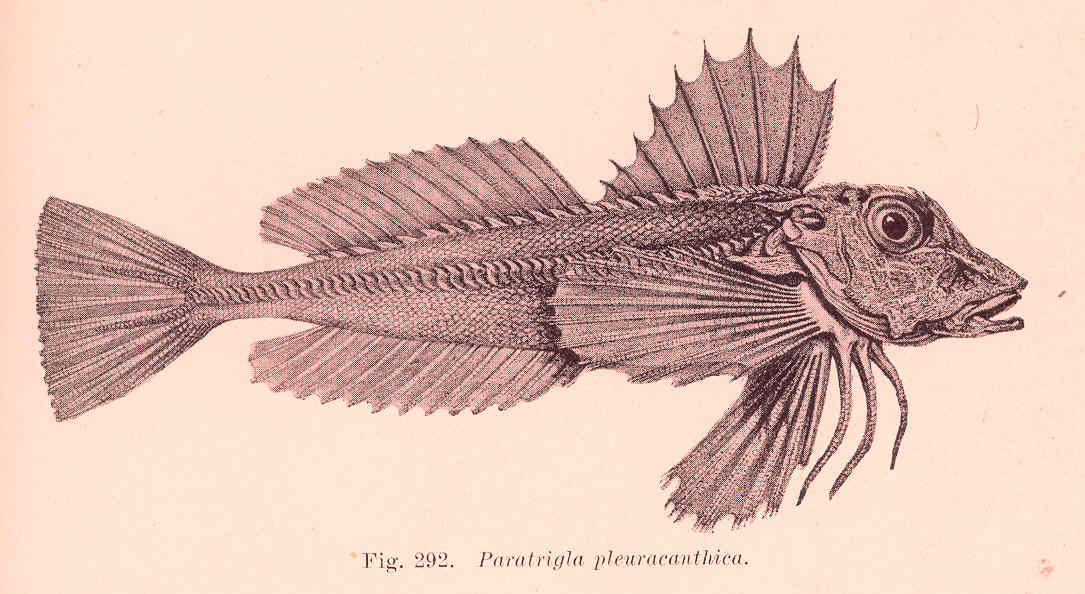

Scientific classification
- Kingdom: Animalia
- Phylum: Chordata
- Class: Actinopterygii
- Order: Perciformes
- Family: Triglidae
- Genus: Lepidotrigla
- Species: L. pleuracanthica

Binomial name
- Lepidotrigla pleuracanthica (J. Richardson, 1845)

Synonyms
- Trigla pleuracanthica Richardson, 1845

= Eastern spiny gurnard =

Species of fish

The Eastern spiny gurnard (Lepidotrigla pleuracanthica) is a species of marine, demersal ray-finned fish from the family Triglidae, the gurnards and sea robins. It is endemic to Australia.

== Taxonomy ==
The Eastern spiny gurnard was first formally described as Trigla pleuracanthica in 1845 by the Scottish naval surgeon, arctic explorer and naturalist John Richardson with the type locality given as Sydney. Although regarded as a valid species by some authorities, others regard this taxon as a junior synonym of Lepidotrigla papilio.
