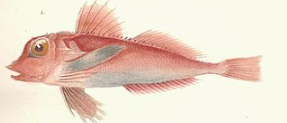

Conservation status
- Least Concern (IUCN 3.1)

Scientific classification
- Kingdom: Animalia
- Phylum: Chordata
- Class: Actinopterygii
- Order: Perciformes
- Family: Triglidae
- Genus: Lepidotrigla
- Species: L. cavillone

Binomial name
- Lepidotrigla cavillone (Lacépède, 1801)

Synonyms
- Trigla cavillone Lacepède, 1801; Trigla aspera Cuvier, 1829; Lepidotrigla aspera (Cuvier, 1829)

= Large-scaled gurnard =

Species of fish

The large-scaled gurnard (Lepidotrigla cavillone) is a species of marine, demersal ray-finned fish from the family Triglidae, the gurnards and sea robins. It is found in the eastern Atlantic Ocean and the Mediterranean Sea.

== Taxonomy ==
The large-scaled gurnard was first formally described as Trigla cavillone in 1801 by the French naturalist Bernard Germain Étienne de La Ville-sur-Illon, comte de Lacépède with the type locality given as the Mediterranean Sea. In 1860 the German-born British herpetologist and ichthyologist Albert Günther described a new genus, Lepidotrigla and in 1919 the American ichthyologist David Starr Jordan designated Trigla aspera as its type species. Trigla aspera had been described in 1829 by the French zoologist Georges Cuvier but is now considered to be a junior synonym of Lacépède's Trigla cavillone. The specific name cavillone was the common name for this fish along France's southern coast and derives from caville or cheville both of which mean "peg" or "plug".

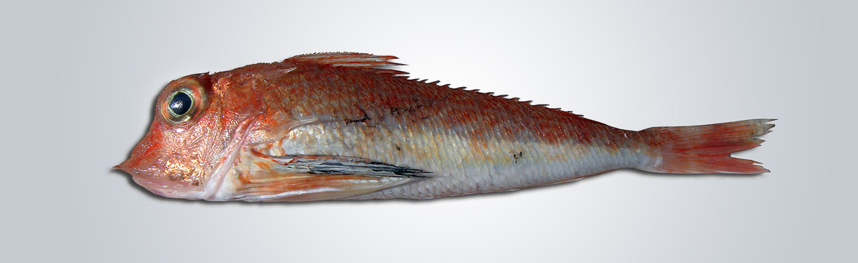

== Description ==
The large-scaled gurnard has a large head armoured with large bony plates. There is a deep, clear occipital groove which is spiny. There are 2 spines in front of the eyes and the front spines on the snout are the longest. There are no vomerine teeth. The longest of the free pectoral fins rays is short and does not extend as far as the anus. There are between 8 and 10 spines in the first dorsal fin and the second dorsal fin and the anal fin Have between 14 and 16 soft rays. There are no scales on the breast and the scales on the body are firmly attached to the skin. The scales are ctenoid and their width is greater than the length. The colour is pink or dusky pink with contrasting dark blue pectoral fins which have pink bases. The maximum published total length of this species is 20 cm (7.9 in), although 12.5 cm (4.9 in) is more typical.

== Distribution and habitat ==
The large scaled gurnard is found in the Eastern Atlantic Ocean from Portugal south to Mauritania. It is also found throughout the Mediterranean Sea but is absent from the Black Sea. This species occurs on muddy sand and gravel substrates at depth$ between 30 and 450 m (98 and 1,476 ft).

== Biology ==
The large-scaled gurnard feeds on crustaceans, especially mysids and amphipods. Spawning takes place between May and July and the larvae are pelagic. The average age at which sexual maturity is reached is around 2 years old.

== Fisheries ==
The large-scaled gurnard is caught as a bycatch by trawlers and is usually discarded as the fish are rather small. Many countries do not keep specific data on gurnard landings. It is frequently sold in fish markets in the western Mediterranean, Cyprus and Turkey.

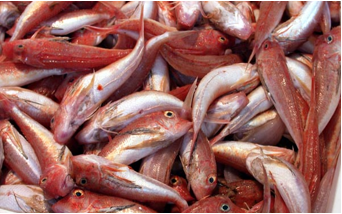
Large-scaled gurnards in a market
