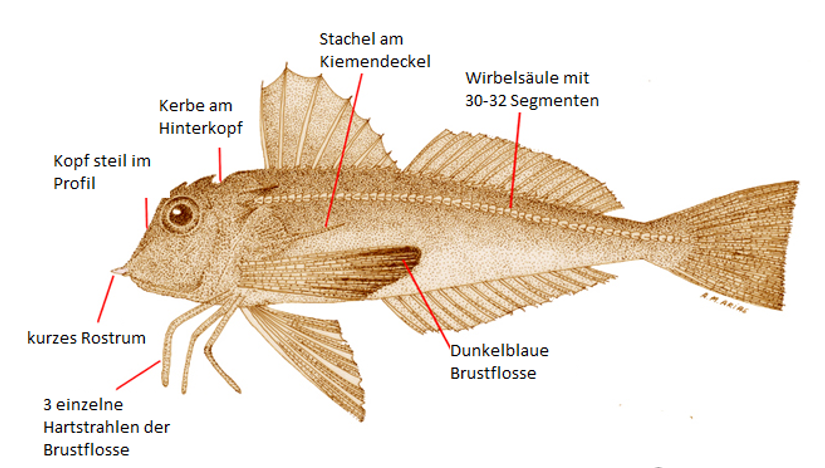
- Large-scaled gurnard (L. cavillone)

Scientific classification
- Kingdom: Animalia
- Phylum: Chordata
- Class: Actinopterygii
- Order: Perciformes
- Family: Triglidae
- Subfamily: Triglinae
- Genus: Lepidotrigla; Günther, 1860

Type species
- Trigla aspera Cuvier, 1829

Species
- see text

Synonyms
- Aoyagichthys Whitley, 1958; Hatha Whitley, 1959; Microtrigla Kaup, 1873; Pachytrigla Fowler, 1938; Palaenichthys Kaup, 1873; Paratrigla Ogilby, 1911; Pristhoplotrigla Fowler, 1938; Sagenocephalus Kaup, 1873; Stagonotrigla Fowler, 1938

= Lepidotrigla =

Genus of fishes

Lepidotrigla is a genus of marine ray-finned fishes belonging to the family Triglidae, the gurnards and sea robins. These gurnards are found in the Eastern Atlantic, Indian and Western Pacific Oceans.

== Taxonomy ==
Lepidotrigla was first described as a genus in 1860 by the German-born British herpetologist and ichthyologist Albert Günther with Trigla aspera, which had been described in 1829 from the Mediterranean Sea by Georges Cuvier, as the type species. The genus is classified within the subfamily Triglinae, the nominate subfamily of the family Triglidae. The genus name prefixes Trigla, the type genus of the Triglidae. with lepido, "scaled", a reference to the larger scales on these gurnards in comparison to those on Trigla.

== Characteristics ==
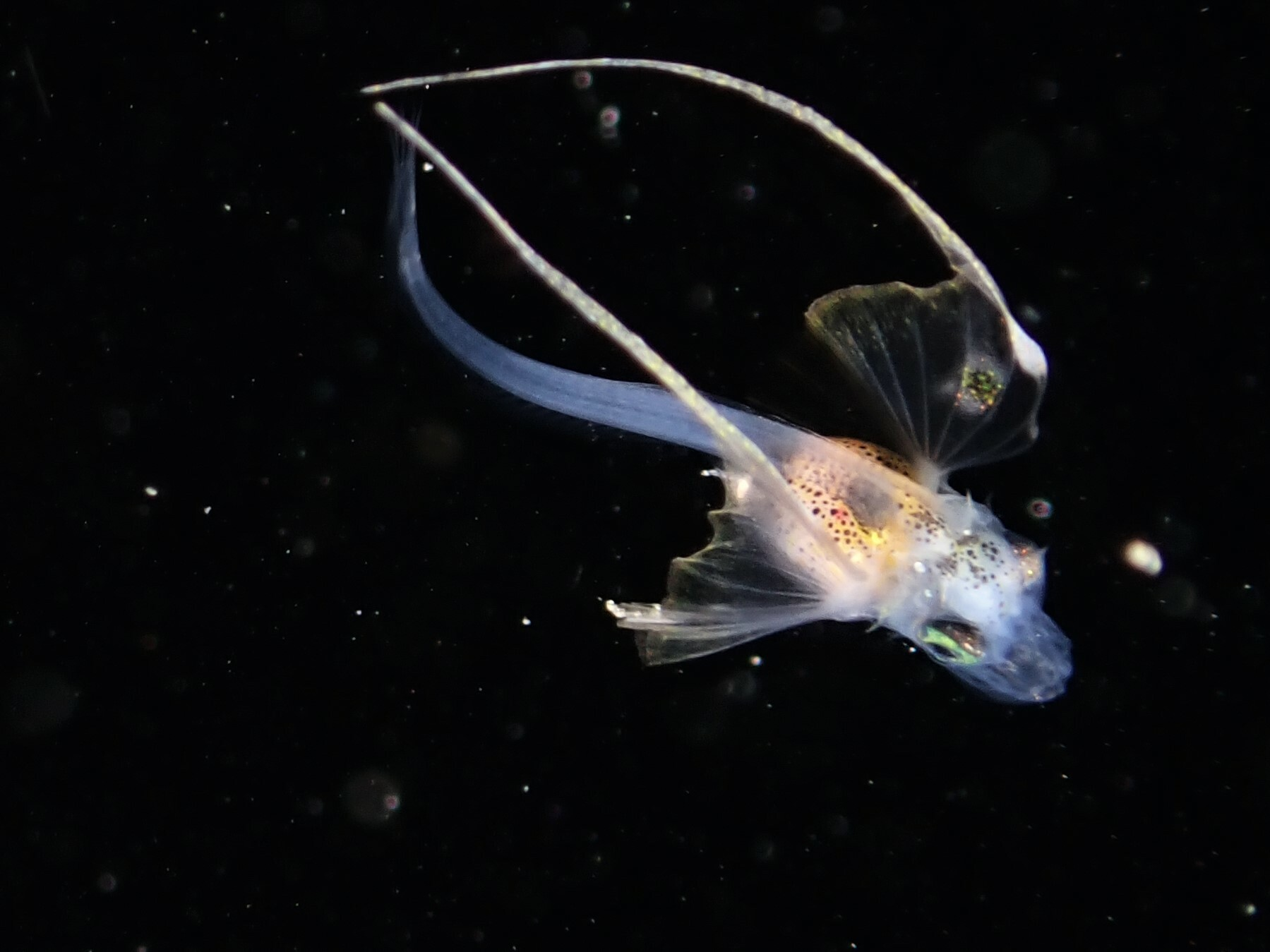
Lepidotrigla larval form

Lepidotrigla gurnards are characterised by having the 3 lower rays of the pectoral fin free of the fin membrane and a scaled tail, like the other Triglid gurnards. The bucklers, bony plate at the base of the dorsal fin spines and rays, have with sharp spines on their rears along the whole length of both first and seconddorsal fins. The groove behind the eyes of these fishes may be complete, running from one side of the head to the other, or there may be just a furrow behind each eye. There are large, ctenoid scales on the body, although some species have cycloid scales on the belly. There are fewer tha than 70 scales in the lateral line. There may, or may not be vomerine teeth. These relatively small grnards vary in size from the smallest, the spotwing gurnard (L. spiloptera) with a maximum published total length of 10 cm (3.9 in), to the scalebreast gurnard (L. cadmani) and L. microptera, both having maximum published total length of 30 cm (12 in).

== Distribution ==
Lepidotrigla gurnards are found in the tropical and warm temperate waters of the eastern Atlantic, Indian and Western Pacific Oceans, with one species L. jimjoebob being found as far east as the Line Islands in the eastern central Pacific.

== Species ==
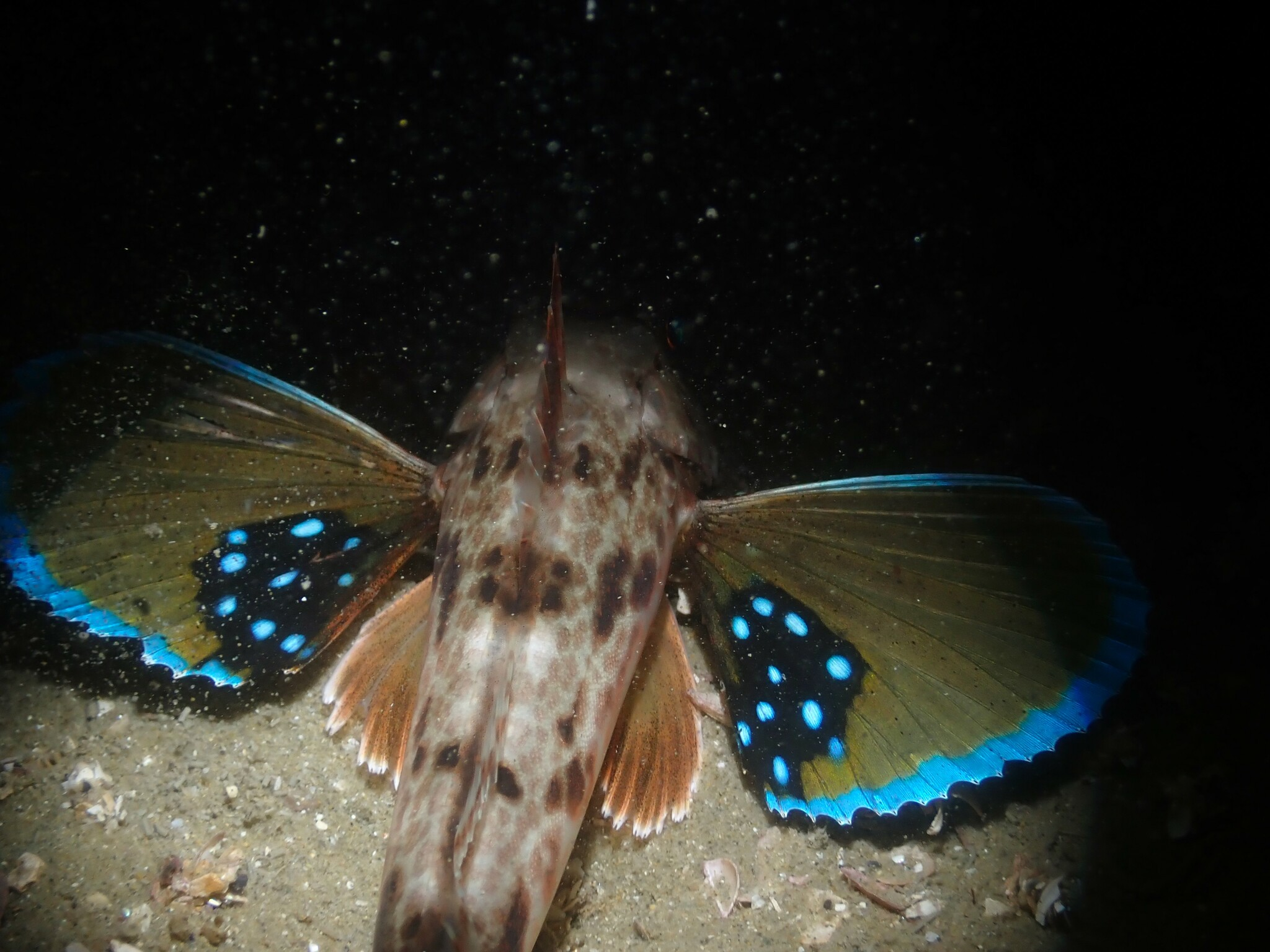
Red gurnard (Lepidotrigla kumu)

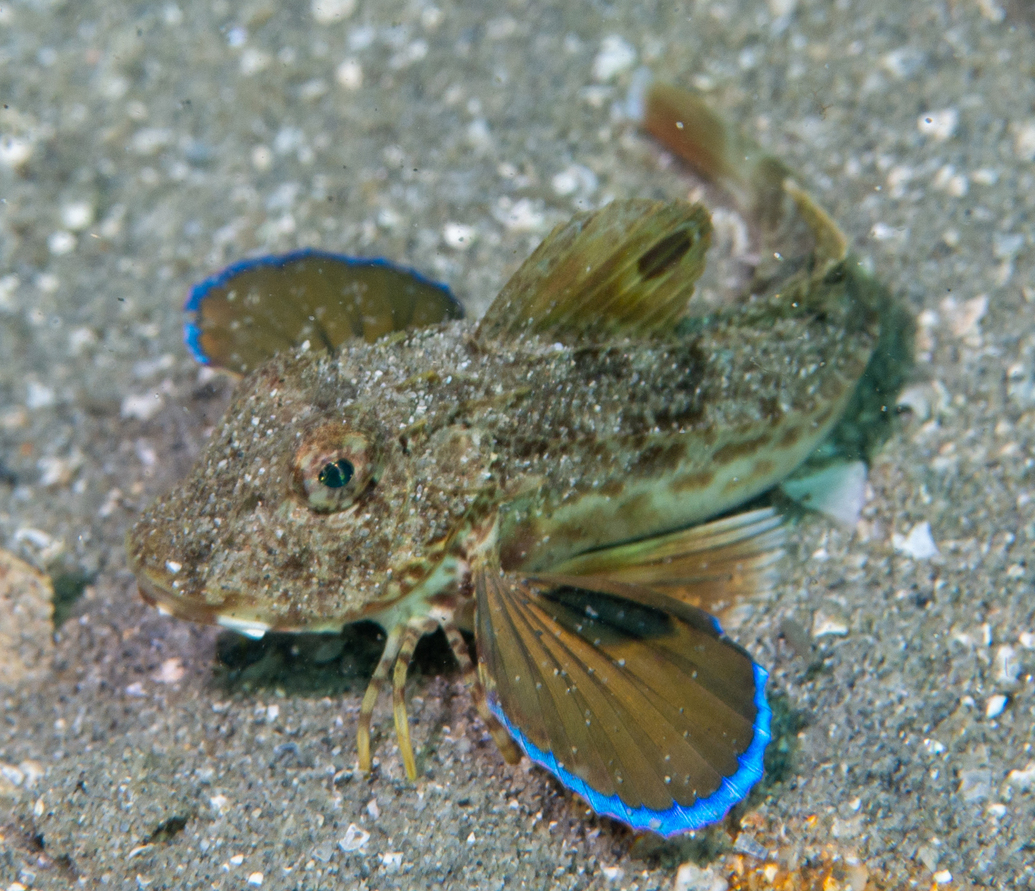
Spiny gurnard (L. papilio)

Lepidotrigla is the most speciose genus in the Triglidae and has 58 species classified within it:

- Lepidotrigla abyssalis D. S. Jordan & Starks, 1904
- Lepidotrigla alata (Houttuyn, 1782)
- Lepidotrigla alcocki Regan, 1908
- Lepidotrigla annamarae del Cerro & Lloris, 1997
- Lepidotrigla argus J. D. Ogilby, 1910 (Long-finned gurnard)
- Lepidotrigla argyrosoma Fowler, 1938
- Lepidotrigla bentuviai Richards & Saksena, 1977 (Twohorn gurnard)
- Lepidotrigla bispinosa Steindachner, 1898 (Bullhorn gurnard)
- Lepidotrigla brachyoptera F. W. Hutton, 1872 (Scaly gurnard)
- Lepidotrigla cadmani Regan, 1915 (Scalebreast gurnard)
- Lepidotrigla calodactyla J. D. Ogilby, 1910 (Drab longfin gurnard)
- Lepidotrigla carolae Richards, 1968 (Carol's gurnard)
- Lepidotrigla cavillone (Lacépède, 1801) (Large-scaled gurnard)
- Lepidotrigla deasoni Herre & Kauffman, 1952
- Lepidotrigla dieuzeidei Blanc & Hureau, 1973 (Spiny gurnard)
- Lepidotrigla eydouxii Sauvage, 1878
- Lepidotrigla faurei Gilchrist & W. W. Thompson, 1914 (Scalybreast gurnard)
- Lepidotrigla firmisquamis Prokofiev & Yato, 2020
- Lepidotrigla grandis J. D. Ogilby, 1910 (Supreme gurnard)
- Lepidotrigla guentheri Hilgendorf, 1879
- Lepidotrigla hime Matsubara & Hiyama, 1932
- Lepidotrigla japonica (Bleeker, 1854)
- Lepidotrigla jimjoebob Richards, 1992
- Lepidotrigla kanagashira Kamohara, 1936
- Lepidotrigla kishinouyi Snyder, 1911
- Lepidotrigla larsoni del Cerro & Lloris, 1997 (Swordtip gurnard)
- Lepidotrigla lepidojugulata S. Z. Li, 1981
- Lepidotrigla longifaciata Yato, 1981
- Lepidotrigla longimana S. Z. Li, 1981
- Lepidotrigla longipinnis Alcock, 1890
- Lepidotrigla macracaina Gomon & Kawai 2018
- Lepidotrigla macrobrachia Fowler, 1938
- Lepidotrigla maculapinna Gomon & Kawai 2018
- Lepidotrigla marisinensis (Fowler, 1938)
- Lepidotrigla microptera Günther, 1873
- Lepidotrigla modesta Waite, 1899 (Grooved gurnard)
- Lepidotrigla mulhalli W. J. Macleay, 1884 (Rough-snouted gurnard)
- Lepidotrigla multispinosa J. L. B. Smith, 1934 (Indian Ocean spiny gurnard)
- Lepidotrigla musorstom del Cerro & Lloris, 1997
- Lepidotrigla nana del Cerro & Lloris, 1997
- Lepidotrigla oglina Fowler, 1938
- Lepidotrigla omanensis Regan, 1905 (Oman gurnard)
- Lepidotrigla papilio (Cuvier, 1829) (Australian spiny gurnard)
- Lepidotrigla pectoralis Fowler, 1938
- Lepidotrigla pleuracanthica J. Richardson, 1845 (Eastern spiny gurnard)
- Lepidotrigla psolokerkos Gomon & Psomadakis, 2018
- Lepidotrigla punctipectoralis Fowler, 1938 (Finspot gurnard)
- Lepidotrigla robinsi Richards, 1997
- Lepidotrigla russelli del Cerro & Lloris, 1995 (Smooth gurnard)
- Lepidotrigla sayademalha Richards, 1992
- Lepidotrigla sereti del Cerro & Lloris, 1997
- Lepidotrigla spiloptera Günther, 1880 (Spotwing gurnard)
- Lepidotrigla spinosa Gomon, 1987 (Shortfin gurnard)
- Lepidotrigla tanydactyla Gomon & Kawai 2018
- Lepidotrigla umbrosa J. D. Ogilby, 1910 (Blackspot gurnard)
- Lepidotrigla vanessa (J. Richardson, 1839) (Butterfly gurnard)
- Lepidotrigla vaubani del Cerro & Lloris, 1997
- Lepidotrigla venusta Fowler, 1938

== See also ==
- List of prehistoric bony fish
