= Pakistan International Airlines Flight 268 =

1992 aviation accident in Nepal

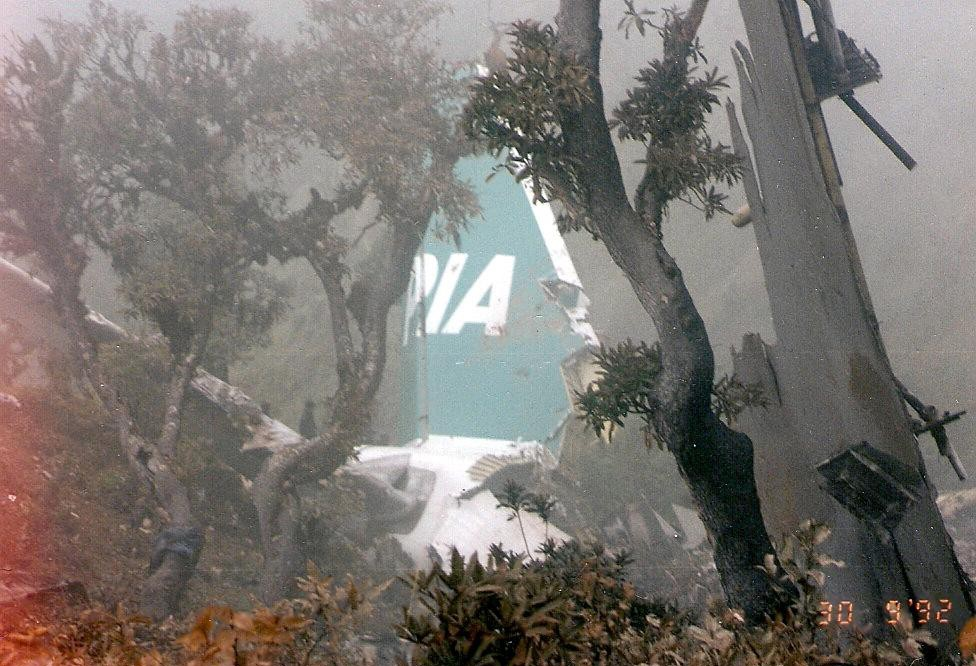
- Wreckage of the tail section

Accident
- Date: 28 September 1992
- Summary: Controlled flight into terrain due to pilot error
- Site: Bhattedanda, Nepal; 27°31′58″N 85°17′05″E

Aircraft
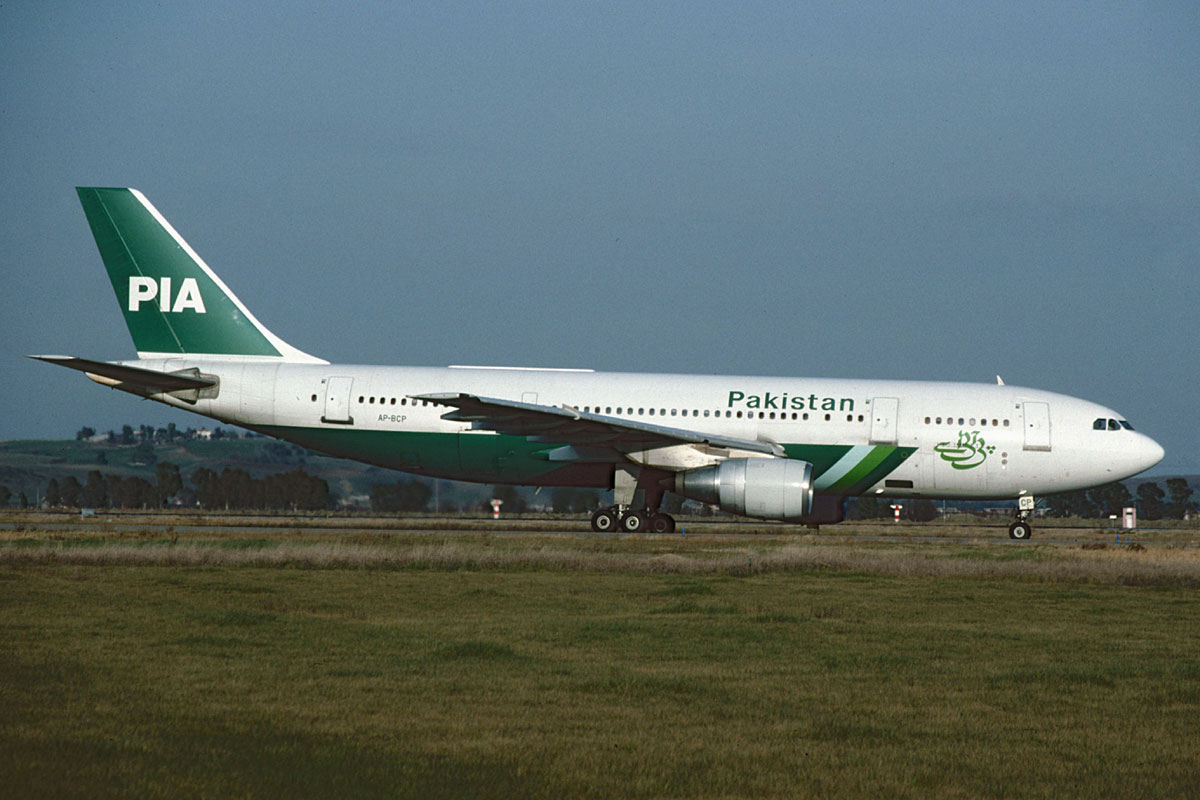
- AP-BCP, the aircraft involved in the accident, seen in February 1992
- Aircraft type: Airbus A300B4-103
- Operator: Pakistan International Airlines
- IATA flight No.: PK268
- ICAO flight No.: PIA268
- Call sign: PAKISTAN 268
- Registration: AP-BCP
- Flight origin: Jinnah International Airport, Karachi, Pakistan
- Destination: Tribhuvan International Airport, Kathmandu, Nepal
- Occupants: 167
- Passengers: 155
- Crew: 12
- Fatalities: 167
- Survivors: 0

Pakistan International Airlines Flight 268 was an Airbus A300, registration AP-BCP, which crashed while approaching Kathmandu's Tribhuvan International Airport on 28 September 1992. All 167 people on board were killed. Flight 268 is the worst accident in the history of Pakistan International Airlines, and the worst ever to occur in Nepal.

== Background ==
=== Aircraft ===
The aircraft involved was a 16-year-old Airbus A300B4-103 registered as AP-BCP with serial number 025. The aircraft was built in 1976. The aircraft had a total of 39,045 flying hours and 19,172 flight cycles at the time of the accident.

=== Crew ===
The 49-year-old Captain Iftikhar Janjua had logged 13,192 flight hours, including 6,260 hours on the Airbus A300. The 38-year-old First Officer Hassan Akhtar had 5,849 flight hours, with 1,469 of them on the Airbus A300.

Two flight engineers were on board: one operating and the other observing. The 40-year-old unnamed operating flight engineer had 5,289 flight hours, with 2,516 of them on the Airbus A300. The 42-year-old observing flight engineer Muhammad Ashraf had 8,220 flight hours, including 4,503 hours on the Airbus A300.

== Accident ==
Flight 268 departed Karachi at 11:13 AM Pakistan Standard Time for Kathmandu. Upon contacting Nepalese air traffic control, the aircraft was cleared for an approach from the south called the Sierra approach. An aircraft cleared to use this approach was at the time directed to pass over a reporting point called "Romeo" located 41 nautical miles (76 km) south of the Kathmandu VOR (or at 41 DME) at an altitude of 15,000 feet. The aircraft was to then descend in seven steps to 5,800 feet, passing over a reporting point known as "Sierra" located at 10 DME at an altitude of 9,500 feet, before landing at Kathmandu. This approach allowed aircraft to pass over the Mahabharat Range directly south of Kathmandu (the crest of which is located just north of the Sierra reporting point) at a safe altitude.

Shortly after reporting at 10 DME, at 2.30 pm the aircraft crashed at approximately 7,300 feet (2,200 m) into the side of the 8,250 ft (2,524 m) mountain at Bhattedanda, disintegrating on impact, instantly killing all on board; the tail fin separated and fell into the forest at the base of the mountainside.

This accident occurred 59 days after Thai Airways International Flight 311 crashed north of Kathmandu.

== Victims ==
Nationality	Passengers	Crew	Total
United Kingdom	36	-	36
Nepal	30	-	30
France	30	-	30
Pakistan	11	12	23
Netherlands	14	-	14
Spain	14	-	14
Bangladesh	4	-	4
United States	3	-	3
Canada	2	-	2
Unknown	2	-	2
Japan	1	-	1
New Zealand	1	-	1
Total	155	12	167

== Investigation and causes ==
After the accident, the Nepali Military assisted with investigators to find the aircraft's black box. The investigation was handled by Andrew Robinson from the Air Accident Investigation Branch (AAIB). The black box was initially sent to Paris for decoding.

At the time of impact, eye witnesses near the accident site confirmed that there was little to no wind or rain and no thunderstorms in the area. Investigators found no technical problems documented for the A300 and, after considering it as a cause, subsequently ruled out terrorism.

Although no pertinent flight deck conversation was recovered from Flight 268's cockpit voice recorder by investigators with the Transportation Safety Board of Canada (TSB), which assisted with the investigation, data recovered from the flight data recorder by the TSB showed that the aircraft initiated each step of its descent one step too early. At 16 DME the aircraft was a full 1,000 feet below its cleared altitude; at 10 DME (the Sierra reporting point) it was 1,300 feet below its cleared altitude. The aircraft approached the Mahabharat Range at an insufficient altitude and crashed into the south slope. Although the pilots of Flight 268 reported their aircraft's altitude accurately to air traffic control, controllers did nothing to warn them of their inappropriate altitude because of a lack of radar.

Investigators determined that the accident had been caused mainly by pilot error. Visibility was poor due to overcast conditions and the ground proximity warning system would not have been triggered in time because of the steep terrain. The approach plates for Kathmandu issued to PIA pilots were also determined to be unclear, and Nepalese air traffic controllers were judged timid and reluctant to intervene in what they saw as piloting matters such as terrain separation. The report recommended that ICAO review navigational charts and encourage their standardisation, and that the approach to Kathmandu Airport be changed to be less complex.

== Memorials ==
PIA paid for the Lele PIA Memorial Park at Lele, at the foot of a mountain about 10 km north of the accident site. In 2012 they ceased paying for the maintenance of the site, the funding of which was then left to relatives of the victims of the accident. In 2023 the local district council took responsibility for the preservation and development of the site.

An organisation named Rupak Memorial Foundation was formed in Nepal to tribute Nepal national football team former captain and FIFA referee Rupak Raj Sharma who was among the victims along with the other passengers. Sharma acted as the head referee of the match between Pakistani club Wohaib and Club Valencia from Maldives in the return leg of the 1992–93 Asian Club Championship held at the Railway Stadium in Lahore on 27 September 1992. The next day, on the way home from Pakistan after the match, Sharma died along with the other three assistant referees of the match, Shyam Shrestha, Roshan Kumar Shrestha and Hira Ratna Bajracharya.

The Wilkins Memorial Trust, a UK charitable organisation that provides aid to Nepal, was established in memory of a family killed in the accident.

== In popular culture ==
The accident is featured in the first episode of Season 20 of Mayday, also known as Air Crash Investigation. The episode is titled "Kathmandu Descent".

== See also ==
- List of accidents and incidents involving commercial aircraft
- Thai Airways International Flight 311
- Garuda Indonesia Flight 152
- List of airplane accidents in Nepal
- Off-by-one error
