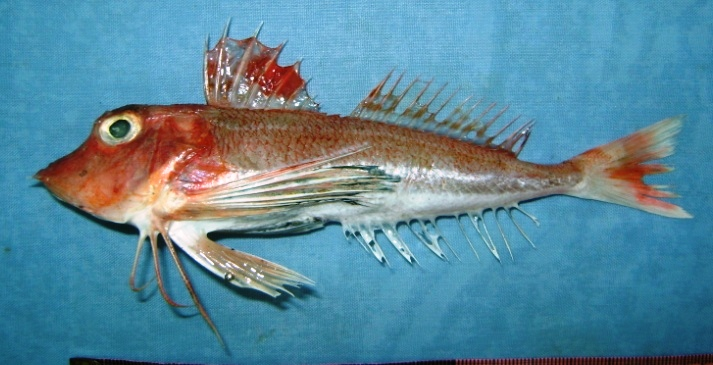

Conservation status
- Least Concern (IUCN 3.1)

Scientific classification
- Kingdom: Animalia
- Phylum: Chordata
- Class: Actinopterygii
- Order: Perciformes
- Family: Triglidae
- Genus: Lepidotrigla
- Species: L. spiloptera

Binomial name
- Lepidotrigla spiloptera Günther, 1880

= Lepidotrigla spiloptera =

Species of fish

Lepidotrigla spiloptera, the spotwing gurnard, spotfin gurnard or red-fringed gurnard, is a species of marine, demersal ray-finned fish from the family Triglidae, the gurnards and sea robins. It has a wide Indo-Pacific distribution.

== Taxonomy ==
Lepidotrigla spiloptera was first formally described in 1880 by the German-born British ichthyologist and herpetologist Albert Günther with the type locality given as the Kai Islands in the Banda Sea in Indonesia. The specific name means "spotted fin", a reference to the white spots scattered across the inner membrane of the pectoral fins.

== Description ==
Lepidotrigla spiloptera has a large, triangular head that has a number of ridges and spines and an occipital groove running from behind the eyes to the crown. There are several prominent spines on the snout. The bases of the first and second dorsal fins have numerous small bony plates bearing strong lateral spines, known as bucklers. The lateral line scales are enlarged, there are no scales on the breast and the scales on the body are not firmly attached. The first dorsal fin has 9 spines while the second dorsal fin has 15 or 16 soft rays and the anal fin has between 14 and 16 soft rays. There are 14 pectoral fin rays, 11 enclosed within the fin membrane, with and the 3 lower pectoral fin rays detached from the membrane. The upper body is reddish and the lower body is white. The first dorsal fin is pink with an elongated red spot on the lower half of the fin between the third and sixth spines. The upper part of the second dorsal reddish with a whitish base and the anal fin is white. There is a wide red band just beyond the middle of the caudal fin with a pink margin which tapers towards the bottom and a horizontal red band on its base. The pelvic fins are white, The pectoral fins have a dark greenish brown inner surface and a large black patch covering the lower third to half of the fin from its base to its outer margin apart from a red margin, this fin has a scattering of obvious white spots over all of the fin except for the red edges. This species has a maximum published total length of 10 cm (3.9 in).

== Distribution and habitat ==
Lepidotrigla spiloptera has a wide Indo-West Pacific distribution occurring from East Africa and the Red Sea eastt through the Indian and Western Pacific Oceans to the South China Sea and the northwestern cioast of Australia. This is a demersal fish found at depth between 54 and 256 m (177 and 840 ft) in areas of soft sediment in coastal and offshore areas, frequently in the vicinity of corals.
