= Pyutar =

Pyutar प्युटार
- Village of Bagmati Rural Municipality
- Location in Nepal
- Coordinates: 27.47°N 85.28°E
- Country: Nepal
- Province: Province No. 3
- District: Lalitpur District

Population (1991)
  - Total: 1,600
- Time zone: UTC+5:45 (Nepal Time)
- Postal code: 44713
- Area code: 01

Pyutar is a village and former Village Development Committee that is now part of Bagmati Rural Municipality in Province No. 3 of central Nepal. At the time of the 1991 Nepal census it had a population of 1,600 living in 278 individual households.
