= Gimdi =

Gimdi गिम्दी
- Village of Bagmati Rural Municipality
- Location in Nepal
- Coordinates: 27.44°N 85.36°E
- Country: Nepal
- Province: Province No. 3
- District: Lalitpur District

Population (1991)
  - Total: 2,170
- Time zone: UTC+5:45 (Nepal Time)

Gimdi is one of former Village Development Committee of Lalitpur, Nepal. The village is around 80 kilometers away from Kathmandu. It lies in Ward No. 7 of Bagmati Rural Municipality, Lalitpur Province No. 3 of central Nepal. According to National Population Census, 2,299 people who lived of 461 household in Nepal in 2011. It has touched the border of Mahankal Rural Municipality of Lalitpur and Bagmati Rural Municipality of Makwanpur District.
