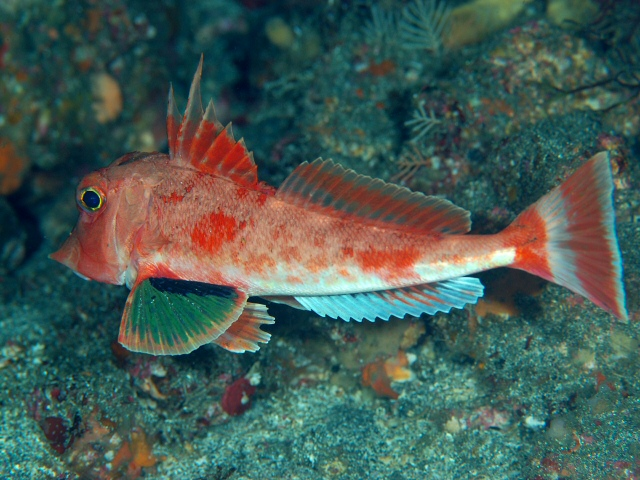

Scientific classification
- Kingdom: Animalia
- Phylum: Chordata
- Class: Actinopterygii
- Order: Perciformes
- Family: Triglidae
- Genus: Lepidotrigla
- Species: L. guentheri

Binomial name
- Lepidotrigla guentheri Hilgendorf, 1879

= Lepidotrigla guentheri =

Species of fish

Lepidotrigla guentheri is a species of marine, demersal ray-finned fish from the family Triglidae, the gurnards and sea robins. It is found in the Northwestern Pacific Ocean.

== Taxonomy ==
Lepidotrigla guentheri was first formally described in 1879 by the German zoologist and palaeontologist Franz Martin Hilgendorf with the type locality given as Tokyo. The identity off the person honoured in the specific name was not given by Hilgendorf but it is likely to be the ichthyologist and herpetologist Albert Günther of the British Museum (Natural History) who named the genus Lepidotrigla in 1860.

== Description ==
Lepidotrigla guentheri has between 7 and 9 spines, the second being elongated, in the first dorsal fin while both the second dorsal fin and the anal fin have 15 or 16 soft rays. There are 22-24 bucklers, bony plates, along either side of both dorsal fins. There are 14 fin rays in the pectoral fin. There is a projection on the snout which is made up of several spines if varying lengths. There is a large blackish-blue blotch, with white spots within it, on the lower half of the inner surface of the pectoral fins. The maximum published total length of this species is 20 cm (7.9 in).

== Distribution and habitat ==
Lepidotrigla guentheri is found in the Northwestern Pacific Ocean from Taiwan and the East China Sea north to Korea and Japan. It is a demersal fish found on sandy and muddy substrates along the edge of the continental shelf at depths between 70 and 280 m (230 and 920 ft).

== Biology ==
Lepidotrigla guentheri feeds on the substrate and its diet is dominated by crustaceans particularly Leptochela sydniensis, amphipods, and crabs, as well as small amounts of stomatopods, mysids, cumaceans, krill, polychaetes, and copepods. There is little variation in diet with age but smaller fishes consume a higher proportion of amphipods.
