= Lele, Nepal =

Lele लेले Limwatidrang
- Village development committee
- Location in Nepal
- Coordinates: 27.57°N 85.34°E
- Country: Nepal
- Zone: Bagmati Zone
- District: Lalitpur District

Population (1991)
  - Total: 6,928
- Time zone: UTC+5:45 (Nepal Time)

Lele is a village development committee in Lalitpur District in the Bagmati Zone of central Nepal. At the time of the 1991 Nepal census it had a population of 6928 living in 1245 individual households, but the population has increased greatly since then.

Lele is 14 km (1 hour by bus and about 30 minutes by bike) from Lagankhel, Patan, the main city of Lalitpur. It is located in a small valley within the Kathmandu Valley. The river is the main source for irrigation for the farmland.

Lele is a gateway to southern villages of Lalitpur including Bhardeu, Nallu, Chaughare and Gotikhel, and a centre of tourism.

Lele was an important site under the ancient Licchavi dynasty; stone pillars dating to that era can be found there.

== Industry and agriculture ==
There are dairies, mines, a brick factory, a bakery, and other businesses.

Agriculture is the main occupation of people residing in Lele village. In the past people used to do agriculture by traditional methods. But nowadays organic methods are used. Tomato production is increasing. Other crops include potatoes, rice, wheat, barley, onions, garlic, spinach, cauliflower, cabbages, pumpkins, lettuce, ginger, and bitter gourds. Mushroom farming is the most popular, and uses modern techniques.

== Temples and gumbas ==
- Ganesh mandir, Lele
- Sukra Bhagwan Mandir, Lapse
- Devi than mandir, Lapse
- Saraswati Kunda
- Tika Bhirab
- Tileshwor Mahadev
- Ganga Jamuna
- Jayal Kumari, Bal Kumari
- Champeshwori
- Maneshwori
- Manakamana
- Phulchoki Mandir (Located near Manakamana which is exactly located at Lele 3, Kavre)
- Pashupati Mandir
- Godar kulmandir (south 1 km far from champeswori temple )

== Schools and colleges ==
- Saraswoti Higher Secondary School(10+2)
- Ganga Jamuna English Secondary School
- Amar Kanti School
- Maneshwori Prathamik Vidyalaya
- Deurali Prathamik Vidyalaya

== Health facilities ==
- Anandaban Hospital
- The Leprosy Mission Nepal
- Lele Health Post
- Jana chhetana Gaun Ghar Clinic, Lapse

== PIA Memorial Park ==
The Lele PIA Memorial Park was constructed in memory of the 167 people who lost their lives in the 1992 Pakistan International Airlines plane crash at Bhatti Danda.

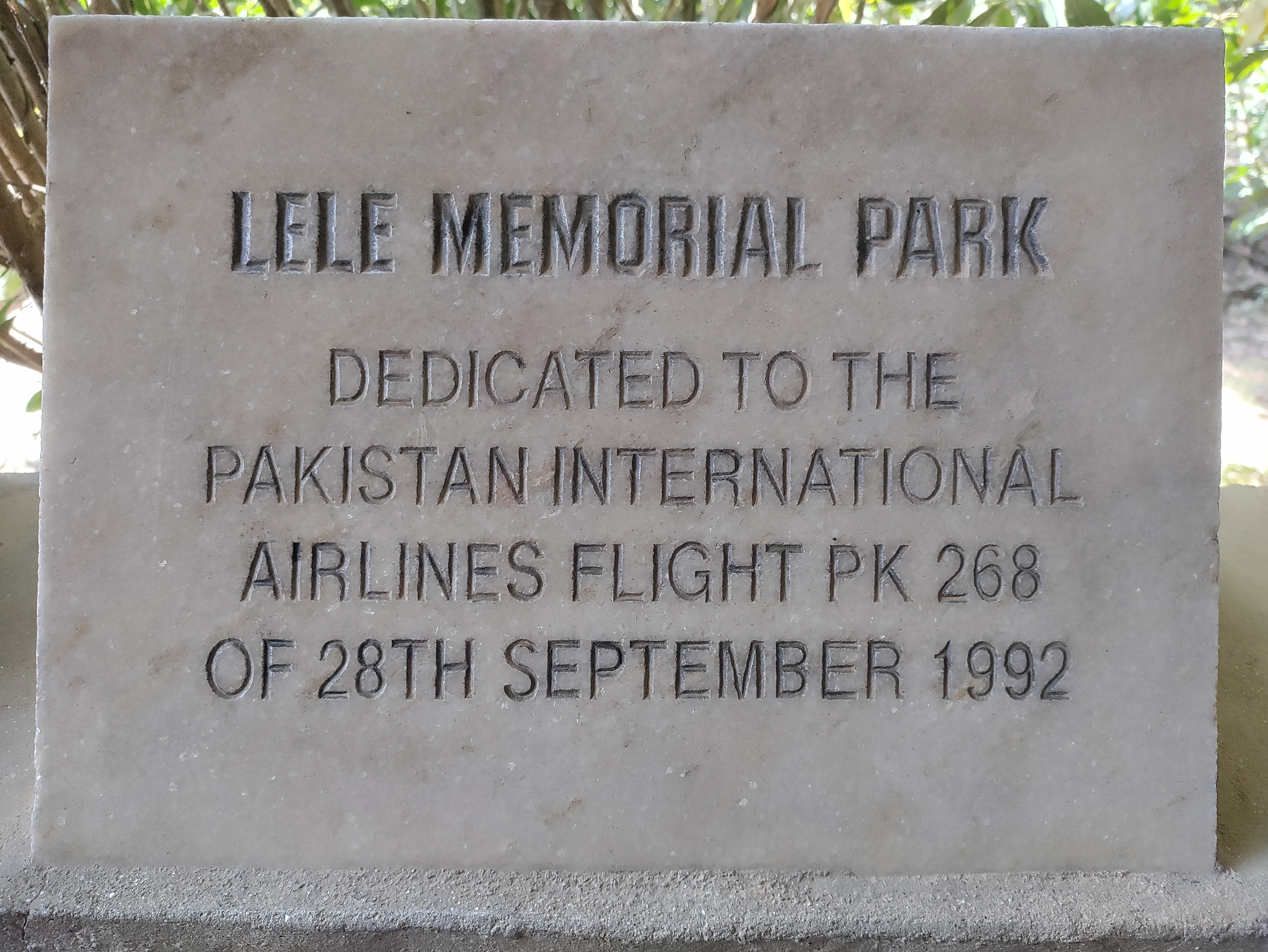

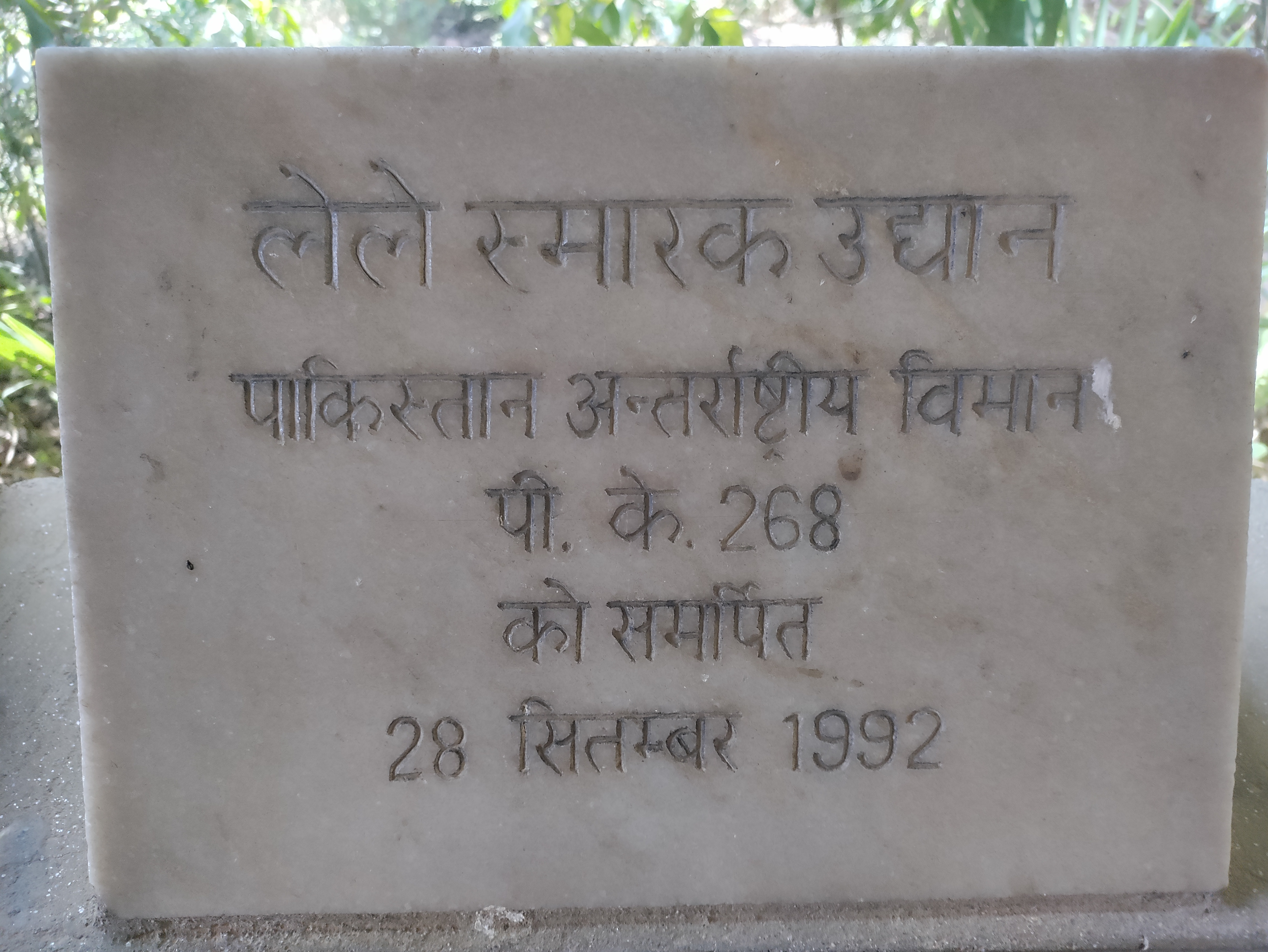

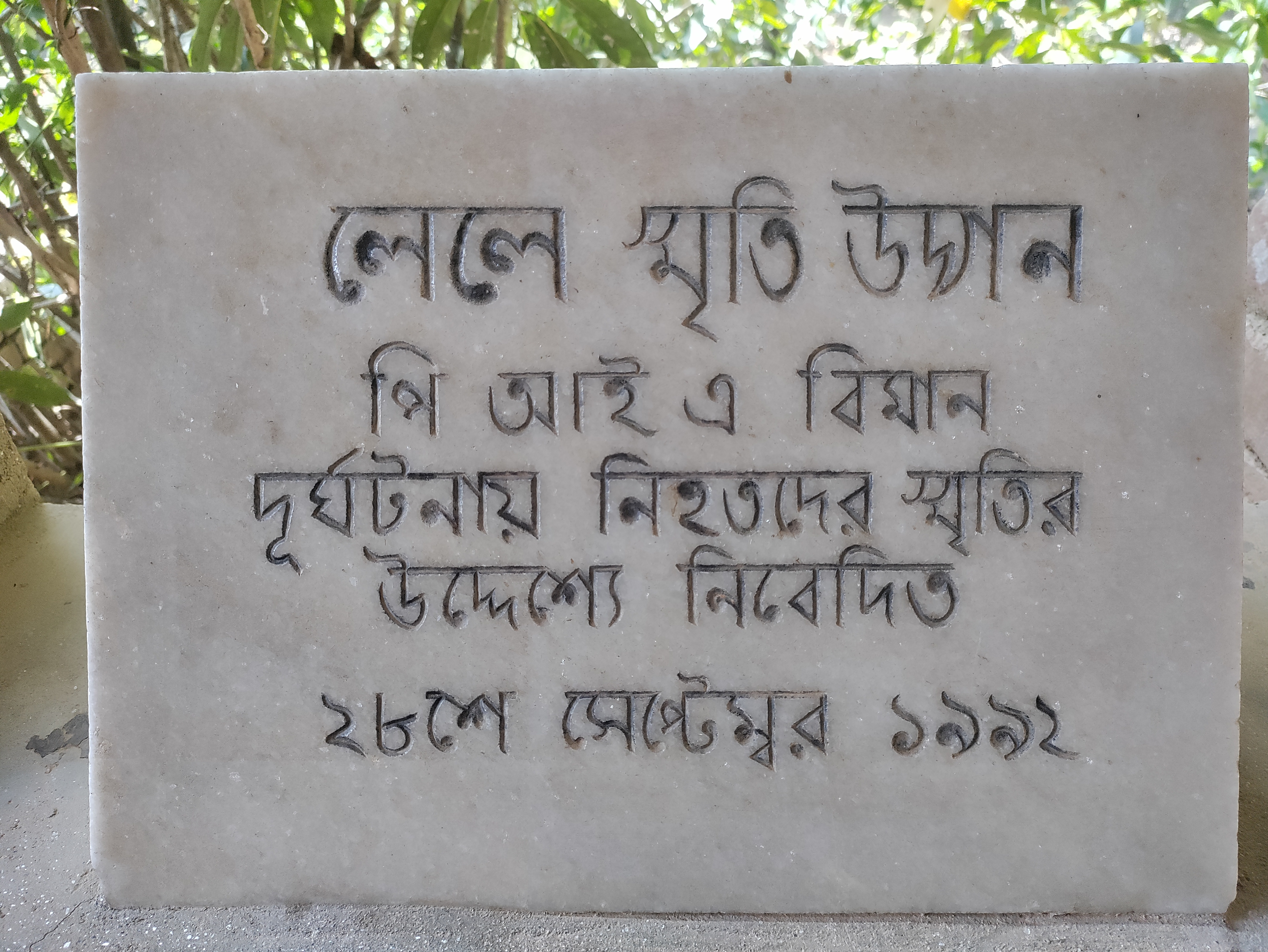

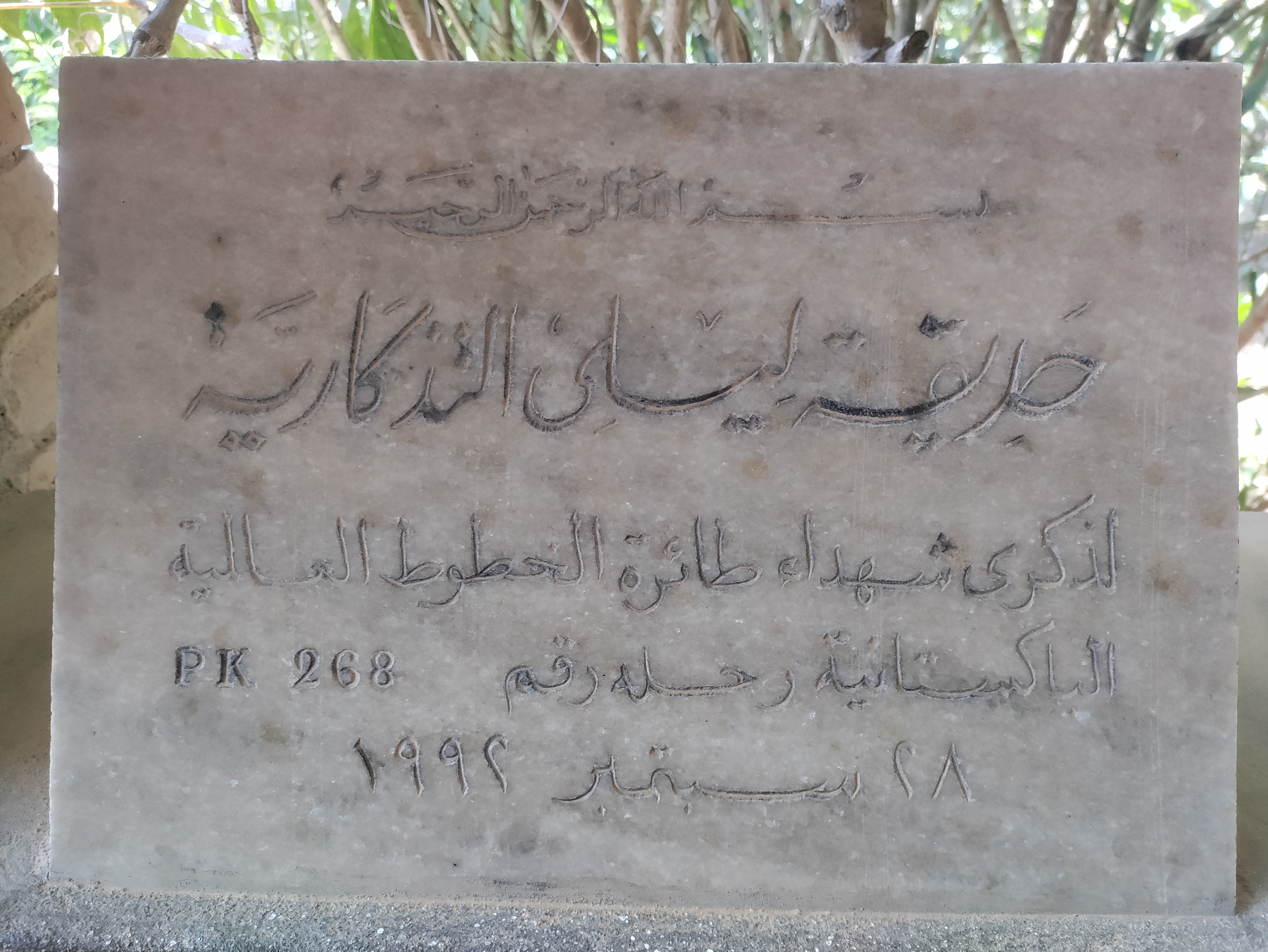

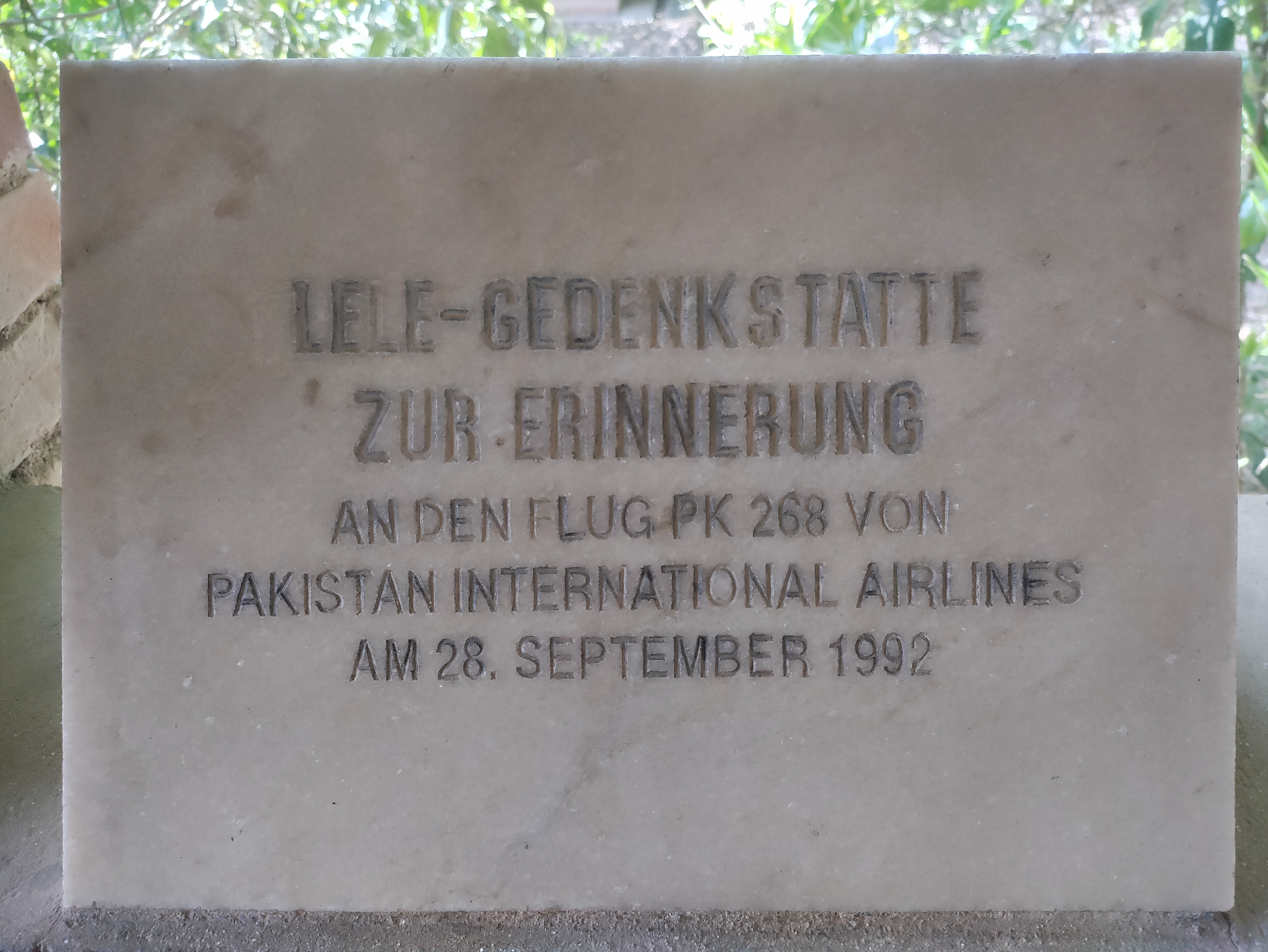

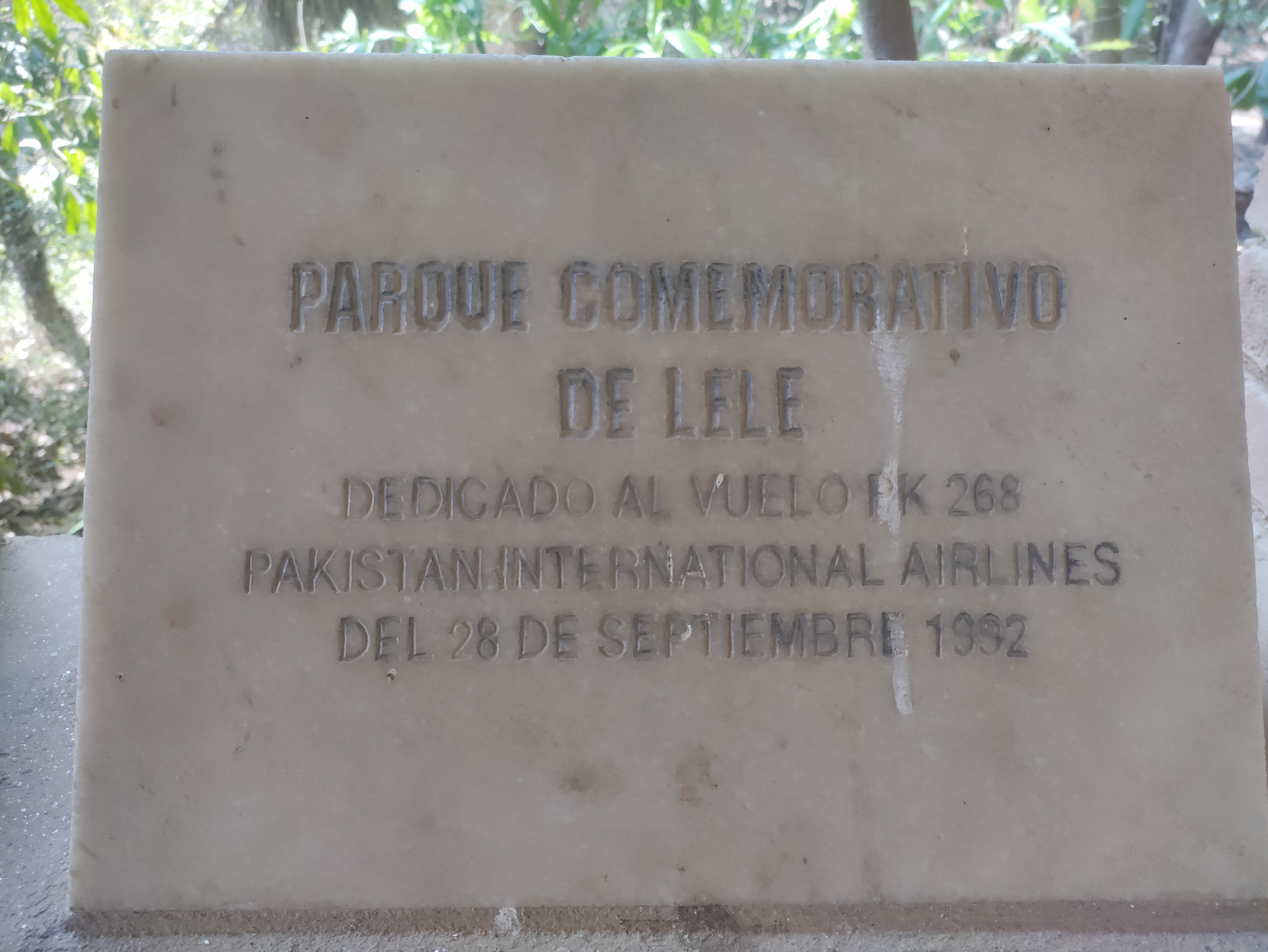

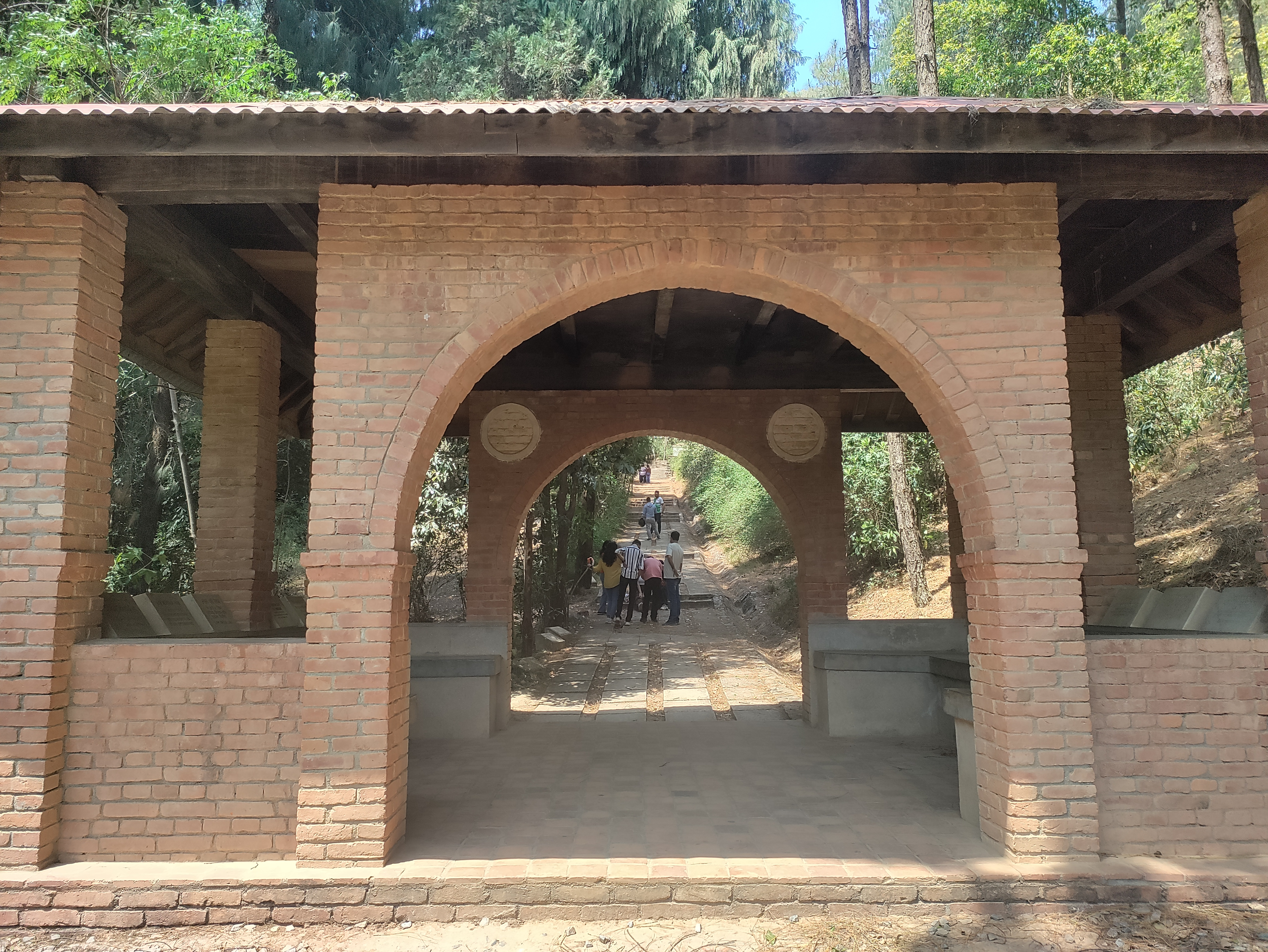
