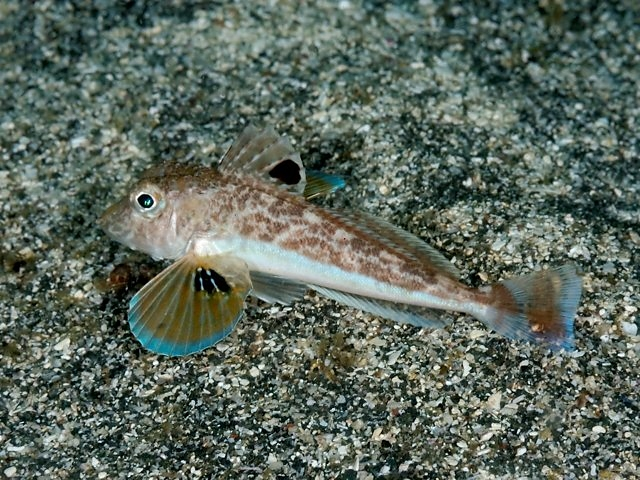

Conservation status
- Least Concern (IUCN 3.1)

Scientific classification
- Kingdom: Animalia
- Phylum: Chordata
- Class: Actinopterygii
- Order: Perciformes
- Family: Triglidae
- Genus: Lepidotrigla
- Species: L. kishinouyi

Binomial name
- Lepidotrigla kishinouyi Snyder, 1911

= Lepidotrigla kishinouyi =

Species of fish

Lepidotrigla kishinouyi, the devil sea robin, is a species of marine, demersal ray-finned fish from the family Triglidae, the gurnards and sea robins. It is found in the northwestern Pacific Ocean.

== Taxonomy ==
Lepidotrigla kishinouyi was first formally described in 1911 by the American ichthyologist John Otterbein Snyder with its type locality given as Kagoshima in Japan. The specific name honours Kamakichi Kishinouye, who was head of the Imperial Fisheries Bureau of Japan.

== Description ==
Lepidotrigla kishinouyi has 8 or 9 spines in its first dorsal fin and both the second dorsal fin and the anal fin have from 14 to 16 soft rays while there are 14 soft rays on the pectoral fins. The projection from the snout is created from a single large outer spine and several shorter inner spines. There is a large blackish-blue blotchmarked with scattered small whitish spots on the lower half of the inner pectoral fin. The maximum published total length of this species is 20 cm (7.9 in).

== Distribution and habitat ==
Lepidotrigla kishinouyi is found in the Northwestern Pacific Ocean where it has been recorded from the Sea of Japan to the East China Sea south of the Kanagawa Prefecture in Japan south to the coastal waters of Taiwan. This is a demersal fish found on sandy-mud substrates at depths between 40 and 140 m (130 and 460 ft).

== Conservation status ==
Lepidotrigla kishinouyi has been by the IUCN assessed as Least Concern. It is not a deliberate quarry for any fishereis, although it mat be caught as bycatch by commercial fisheries in the East China Sea and it not known if this bycatch forms a major threat to this species< However this fish has a relatively large range and deep dwelling habits fishing bycatch may not be a serious threat to this species.
