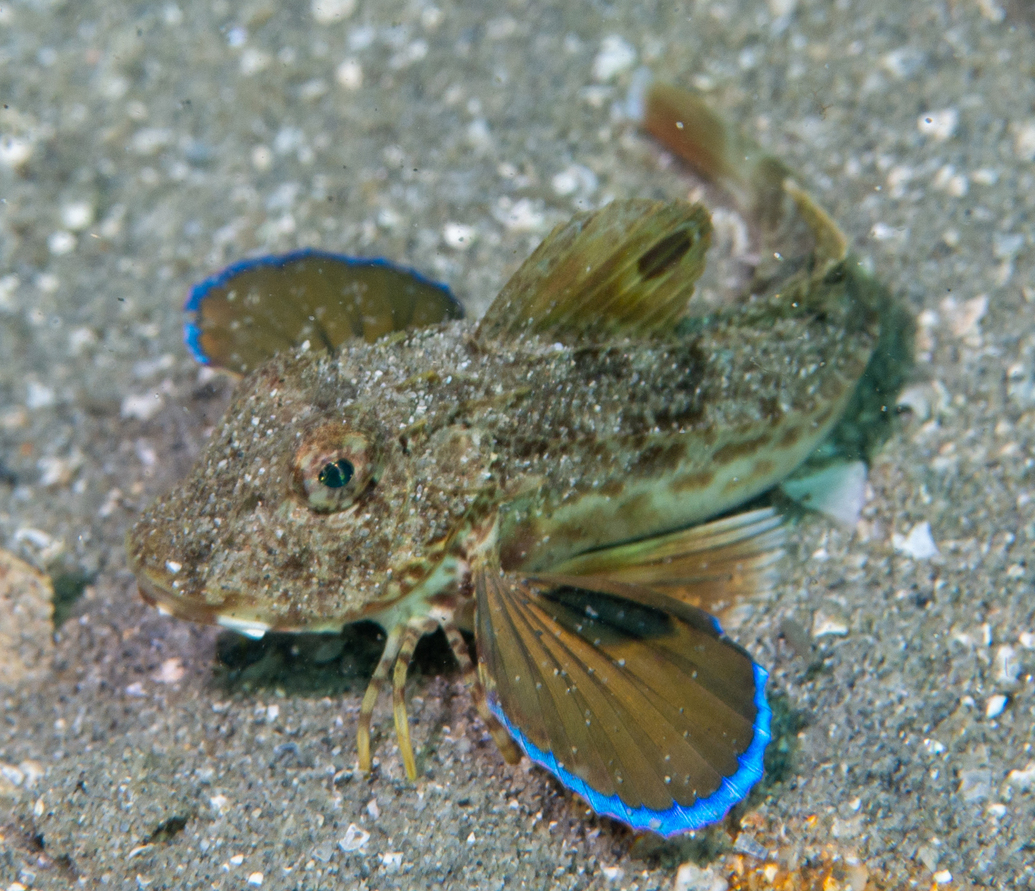

Scientific classification
- Kingdom: Animalia
- Phylum: Chordata
- Class: Actinopterygii
- Order: Perciformes
- Family: Triglidae
- Genus: Lepidotrigla
- Species: L. papilio

Binomial name
- Lepidotrigla papilio Cuvier 1829

Synonyms
- Trigla papilio Cuvier, 1829; Paratrigla papilio (Cuvier, 1829)

= Lepidotrigla papilio =

Species of fish

Lepidotrigla papilio, the spiny gurnard, butterfly gurnard, Eastern spiny gurnard or Southern spiny gurnard. is a species of demersal marine ray-finned fish belonging to the family Triglidae, the gurnards and sea robins. This species is endemic to Australia.

== Taxonomy ==
Lepidotrigla papilio was first formally described in 1829 as Trigla papilio by the French zoologist Georges Cuvier with the type locality given as "Indian seas", although it was actually Australia. Some authorities treat this taxon as a separate species from the Eastern spiny gurnard (L. pleuracanthica), but others treat L. pleuracanthica as a junior synonym of L. papilio. The specific name papilio means "butterfly", Cuvier did not explain this name but he may have been referring to the eyespot on first dorsal fin and/or the pectoral fins that when seen from above look like a butterfly's wings.

== Description ==
Lepidotrigla papilio has a large, bony head with the margin of the snout being nearly smooth and its lateral profile is very slightly concave. The space between the eyes is very flattened and there is deep groove above and behind eye, joining on the top of the head. The bony snout has a small medial notch, edged on either side by tiny marginal spines. The ctenoid scales are firmly attached but are not present on the breast or belly. The lateral line scales are notably enlarged, and each scale has a number of clear spines. The rear margin of the caudal fin is truncate. The tip of the pectoral fin extends past the origin of the anal fin. The first dorsal fin has 8 or 9 spines while the second dorsal fin and the anal fin have 15 or 16 soft rays. There are 14 pectoral fin rays, 11 enclosed within the fin membrane, with and the 3 lower pectoral fin rays detached from the membrane and enlarged. This species is typically coloured red, with reddish brown to dark brown mottling dorsally and on the dorsal fins, and whitish ventrally. The roof of mouth is largely orange. There is a large black spot with white margins on the first dorsal fin. The caudal fin is brownish with whitish band at its base.The pectoral fins have a dark green inner surfave edged with a thin band of blue, in small juveniles this resembles an eyespot. This species reaches a maximum published total length of 20 cm (7.9 in).

== Distribution and habitat ==
Lepidotrigla papilio is found in the southeastern Indian Ocean and southwestern Pacific Ocean and it is endemic to Australia. Here it is found in the temperate seas of southern Australia from central New South Wales to south-western Western Australia, including Tasmania. It is found on shelly and sandy substrates in bays and coastal waters at depths between 2 and 110 m (6 ft 7 in and 360 ft 11 in), however, they are typically found in depths of less than 50 m (160 ft) and juveniles are occasionally found in seagrass beds.

== Biology ==
Lepidotrigla papilio is a carnivore.
