= Malta (disambiguation) =

Malta is a country in Europe.

Malta may also refer to:

== Places ==
=== Malta ===
- Malta (island), the main island of the country
- Malta (European Parliament constituency)
- Malta Majjistral, a former statistical region of Malta
- Malta Xlokk, a former statistical region of Malta

=== Austria ===
- Malta, Austria, a town

=== Brazil ===
- Malta, Paraíba, a municipality in the Northeast Region

=== Latvia ===
- Malta, Malta Parish, a village in Malta Parish
- Malta, Viļāni Parish, a village in Viļāni Parish
- Malta Parish, an administrative unit in Rēzekne Municipality
- Malta (river)

=== Nepal ===
- Malta, Lalitpur, a village
- Malta, Sankhuwasabha, a village

=== Poland ===
- Malta, Lubusz Voivodeship, a village in west Poland
- Lake Malta, an artificial lake in Poznań, Poland

=== Portugal ===
- Malta (Vila do Conde), a freguesia in Vila do Conde

=== Russia ===
- Malta, Russia, a rural locality in Usolsky District, Irkutsk Oblast

=== United States ===
- Malta, Idaho, a city
- Malta, Illinois, a village
- Malta, Montana, a city
  - Malta station, a train station in Malta, Montana
- Malta, New York, a town
- Malta, Ohio, a village
- Malta, Texas, a village
- Malta Township, Big Stone County, Minnesota
- Windsor, Maine, formerly Malta

== Arts and entertainment ==
- Alexander Malta (1938–2016), Swiss operatic baritone
- Malta (band), a Swedish band
- "Malta" (The Apprentice), a 2018 television episode
- Malta (Brazilian band), Brazilian rock band that win the first Superstar TV show
- Malta (Japanese saxophonist), Japanese jazz/fusion saxophonist
- Malta Festival Poznań, an annual theatre festival in Poznań, Poland
- A fictional character in The Sea Prince and the Fire Child

== Other uses ==
- Malta (1807 ship)
- Malta (soft drink), a type of malt beverage
- Malta (newspaper), former Maltese newspaper
- Joseph Malta (1918–1999), United States Army hangman who carried out the Nuremberg executions
- Order of Malta, a Catholic religious order and sovereign entity primarily based in Rome
- A letter in the Tengwar script

== See also ==
- Knights of Malta, a religious order first formed in Jerusalem circa 1099 AD
  - Sovereign Military Order of Malta, the modern successor to the medieval Knights Hospitaller
- Malta Convention, an international agreement on archaeological heritage sites
- Malta fever or brucellosis, a highly contagious zoonosis
- Malta Boat Club, a rowing club located on Philadelphia's Boathouse Row
- Mal'ta–Buret' culture, ancient culture of Siberia
