= Malta, Lalitpur =

Malta माल्टा
- Village of Bagmati Rural Municipality
- Location in Nepal
- Coordinates: 27.9°N 85.15°E
- Country: Nepal
- Province: Province No. 3
- District: Lalitpur District

Population (2001)
  - Total: 2,130
- Time zone: UTC+5:45 (Nepal Time)

Malta is a village and former Village Development Committee that is now part of Bagmati Rural Municipality in Province No. 3 of central Nepal. At the time of the 1991 Nepal census it had a population of 1,753 residing in 311 individual households.
