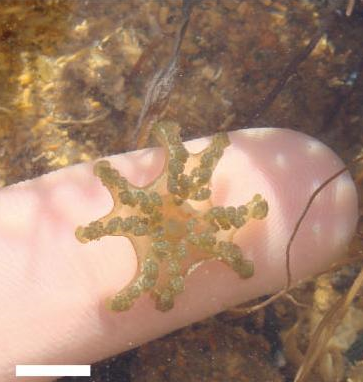

Scientific classification
- Kingdom: Animalia
- Phylum: Cnidaria
- Class: Staurozoa
- Order: Stauromedusae
- Family: Kishinouyeidae
- Genus: Calvadosia
- Species: C. corbini

Binomial name
- Calvadosia corbini (Larson, 1980)

Synonyms
- Kishinouyea corbini

= Calvadosia corbini =

Species of jellyfish

Calvadosia corbini is a stalked jellyfish species in the family Kishinouyeidae from the tropical western Atlantic. The species is named after Peter Corbin, a marine biologist noted for his extensive work on Atlantic Stauromedusae.
