= Calvadosia cruxmelitensis =

Scientific classification
- Kingdom: Animalia
- Phylum: Cnidaria
- Class: Staurozoa
- Order: Stauromedusae
- Family: Kishinouyeidae
- Genus: Calvadosia
- Species: C. cruxmelitensis

Binomial name
- Calvadosia cruxmelitensis (Corbin, 1978)

Synonyms
- Lucernariopsis cruxmelitensis Corbin, 1978

Species of jellyfish

Calvadosia cruxmelitensis is a stalked jellyfish which inhabits the intertidal and sublittoral zones of rocky coasts in south-western England and the Atlantic coast of Ireland.

== Name ==
The Latin name of this species, cruxmelitensis, refers to the arrangement of the white nematocyst capsules (stinging organs) in the distinctive pattern of a Maltese Cross. In 2010, Natural England, the Guardian and the Oxford University Museum of Natural History ran a competition asking members of the public to provide a common name for this species. The name St John's jellyfish was eventually chosen. Runner up names included Marmalade shred jellyfish and Maltese cross medusa.

== Description ==
C. cruxmelitensis is the smallest member of the stalked jellyfishes growing to a maximum of 1.2 cm in diameter and 0.8 cm in height. It characteristically appears 'stalkless', although in fact it attaches to its location via a short stalk that terminates in a broad basal disc. It appears to have the unusual capacity to hold itself very rigidly in this posture, even when subjected to agitation caused by tidal flow.

Calvadosia cruxmelitensis has a translucent, maroon, broad funnel-shaped bell which is divided by hollow septa. The septa walls contain the gonads, which are thick, linear and Y-shaped, joining at the base of the bell and then extending outwards to the arms. It has eight arms which are arranged in a circle. On the end of each arm is a cluster of up to thirty five tentacles, each of which has a rounded head. Unlike Haliclystus salpinx, C. cruxmelitensis does not have tentacle anchors.

== Distribution ==
Originally identified inhabiting Wembury Bay, Devon, C. cruxmelitensis is now known to live on the Atlantic coasts of Ireland and the south-west coast of England, specifically from Swanage to North Devon. The English population has undergone a severe reduction in size in recent years, its numbers dropping by 90% from the 1970s to 2005.

== Habitat ==
It is found on rocky shores which are exposed to moderately strong currents and waves. It lives in shallow water (sublittorally) or close the low tide mark (intertidally). Unlike most stalked jellyfish it does not attach itself to marine eelgrass, preferring to inhabit Irish moss and false Irish moss.

== Lifecycle ==
Members of this species are gonochoristic, that is they are either male or female in gender. Individuals are believed to reach sexual maturity at about half of their maximum size. Gametes are produced from the gonads, which are located on the sepal walls, and shed into the surrounding water where fertilisation takes place. The resultant zygote develops into a free swimming planula larva before attaching itself to a suitable site. Once attached the larva encysts before developing into a small polyp followed by the adult form. Like all stalked jellyfish, a single C. cruximelitensis individual is believed to live for only one year. Numbers of this species in a given location are greatest in mid-winter and lowest in mid-summer.

== Genome and phylogenetic position ==
A draft genome has been published and its phylogenetic position relative to other Cnidaria has been determined using genome-scale data. Its genome is relatively compact (~210 megabases) compared to other cnidarians and other animals.
