= Maltese cross (optics) =

Polymer physics

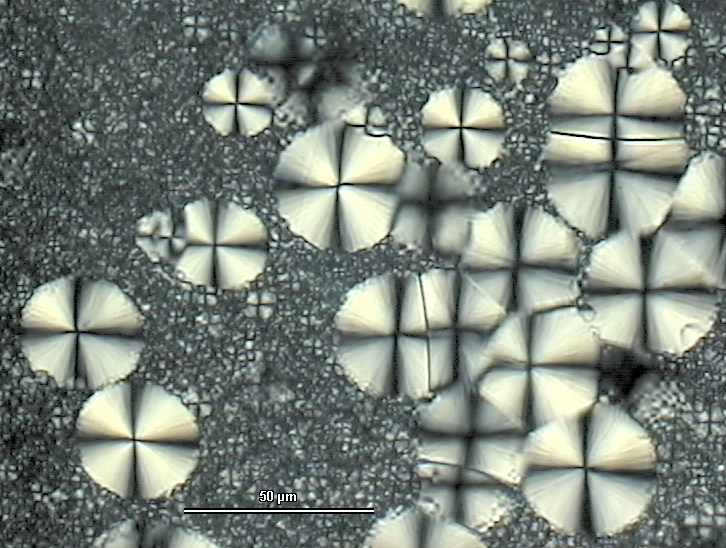
Maltese crosses in an image of polyamide-6,6 spherulites

In polymer physics, Maltese Cross is a set of four symmetrically disposed sectors of high extinction that is displayed when a polymer is observed under polarized lights. This is usually observed when trying to observe spheruliltes in polymers.
