= Bhattedanda =

Bhattedanda भट्टेडाँडा
- Village of Bagmati Rural Municipality
- Location in Nepal
- Coordinates: 27.51°N 85.30°E
- Country: Nepal
- Province: Province No. 3
- District: Lalitpur District

Population (1991)
  - Total: 2,044
- Time zone: UTC+5:45 (Nepal Time)
- Postal code: 44712
- Area code: 01

Bhattedanda is a village and former Village Development Committee that is now part of Bagmati Rural Municipality in Province No. 3 of central Nepal. At the time of the 1991 Nepal census it had a population of 2,044 in 349 individual households.

On 28 September 1992, Pakistan International Airlines Flight 268 crashed in Bhattedanda, killing all 167 people on board.
