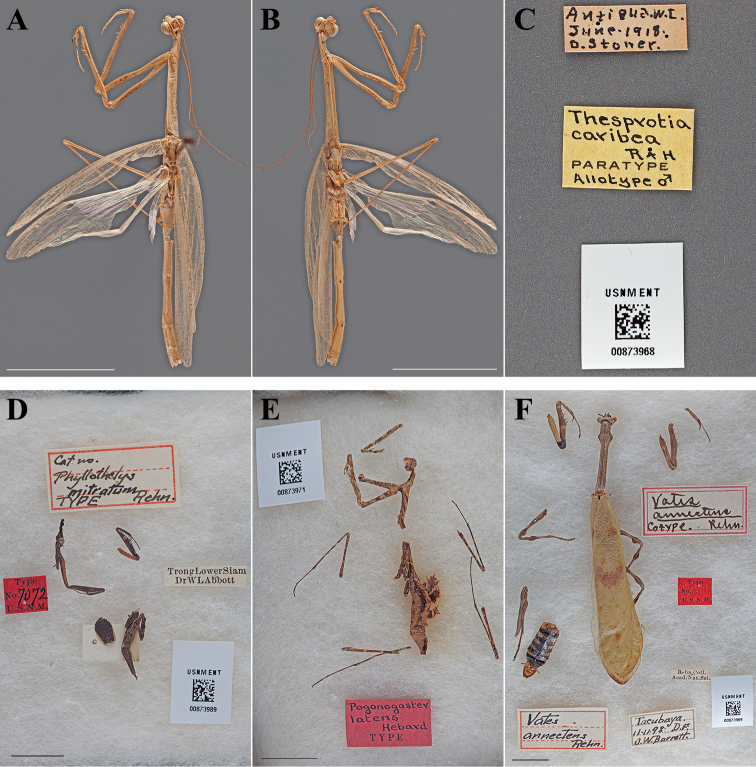
- Type material of various species

Scientific classification
- Kingdom: Animalia
- Phylum: Arthropoda
- Clade: Pancrustacea
- Class: Insecta
- Order: Mantodea
- Family: Hymenopodidae
- Subfamily: Phyllothelyinae
- Tribe: Phyllothelyini
- Genus: Phyllothelys; Wood-Mason, 1877

Synonyms
- Kishinouyeum Ouchi, 1938

= Phyllothelys =

Genus of praying mantises

Phyllothelys is a genus of Asian praying mantids in the family Hymenopodidae, subfamily Phyllothelyinae.

== Species ==
The Mantodea Species File lists:

- Phyllothelys bakeri Werner, 1922
- Phyllothelys breve Wang, 1993
- Phyllothelys cornutus Zhang, 1988
- Phyllothelys decipiens Giglio-Tos, 1915
- Phyllothelys hepaticus Zhang, 1988
- Phyllothelys jianfenglingensis Hua, 1984
- Phyllothelys mitratum Rehn, 1904
- Phyllothelys paradoxum Wood-Mason, 1885
- Phyllothelys robusta Niu & Liu, 1998
- Phyllothelys sinensis Ouchi, 1938
- Phyllothelys taprobanae Wood-Mason, 1889
- Phyllothelys werneri Karny, 1915
- Phyllothelys westwoodi Wood-Mason, 1876 - type species
