= Darjeeling =

City in West Bengal, India

- City
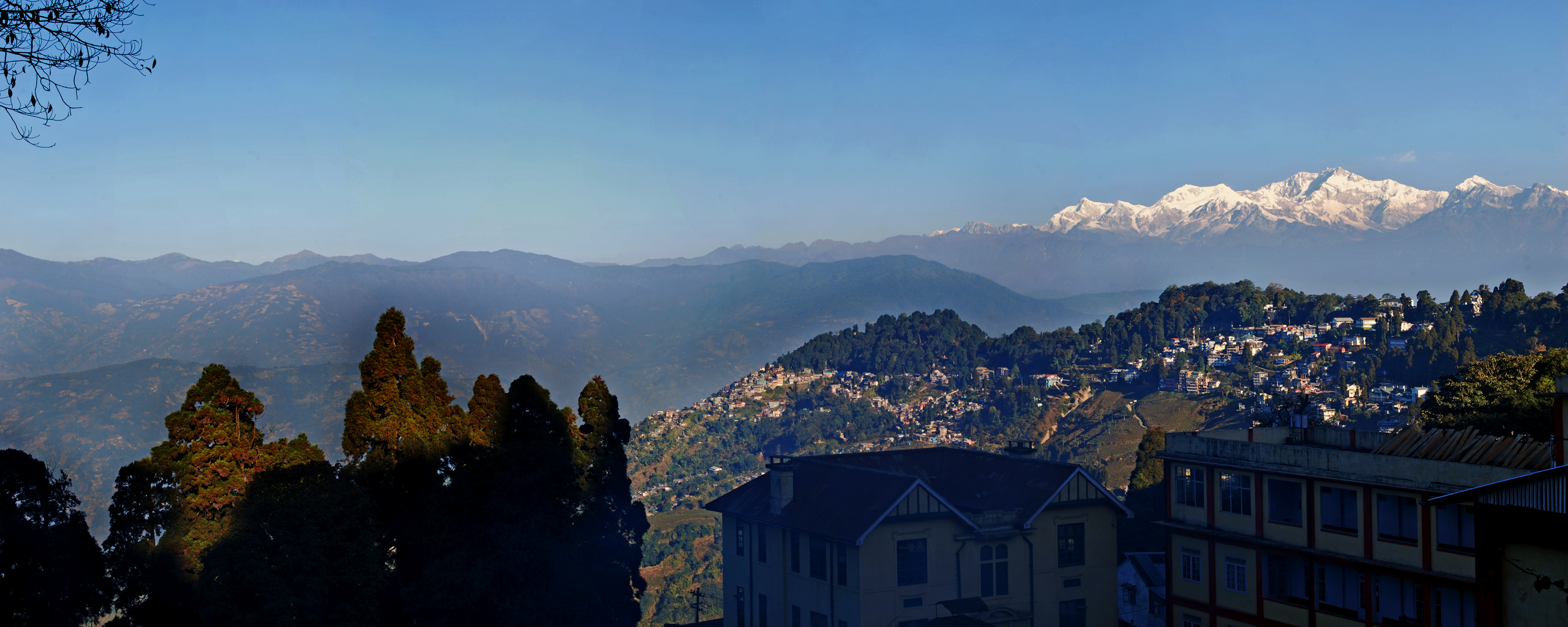
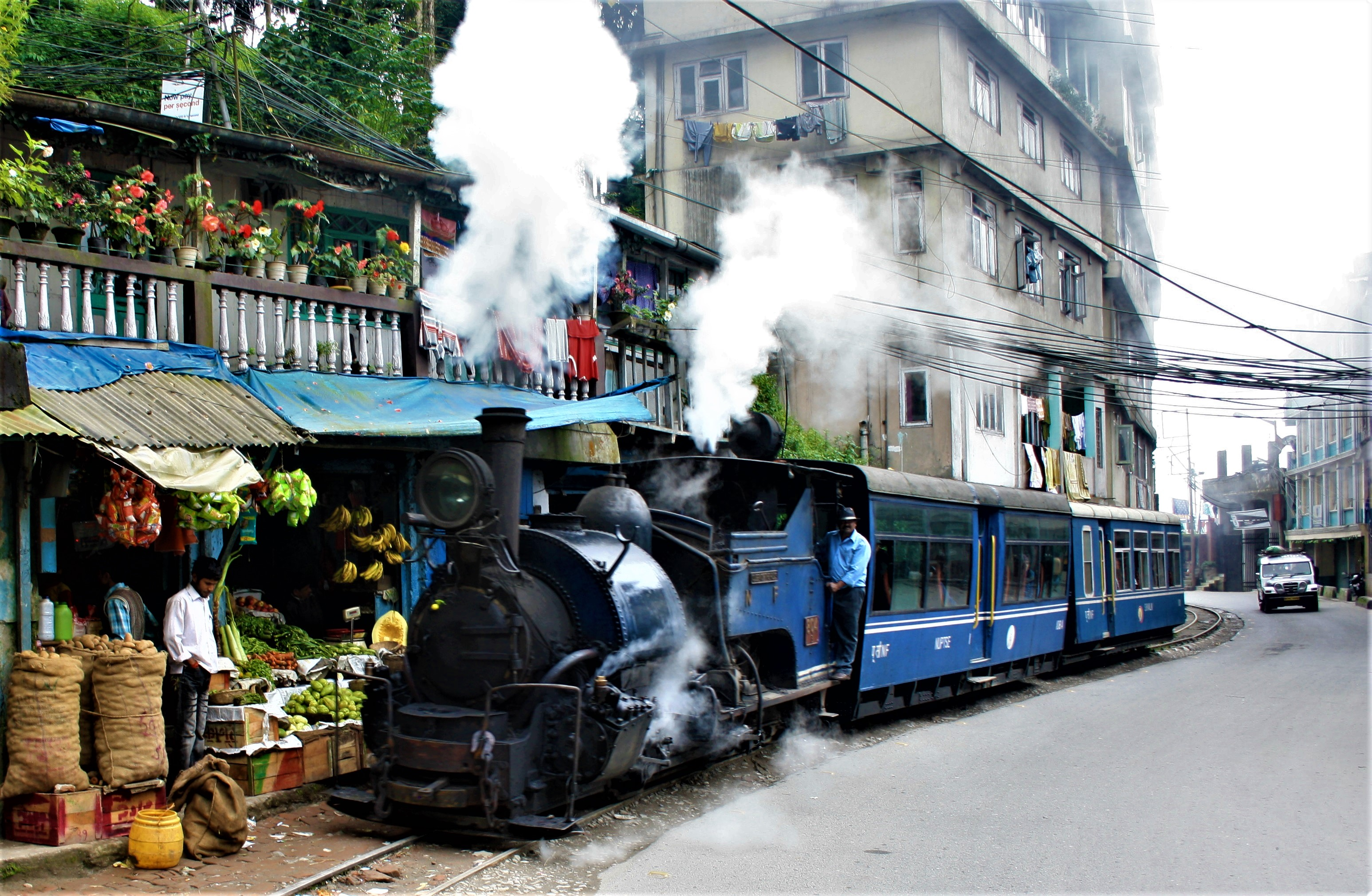
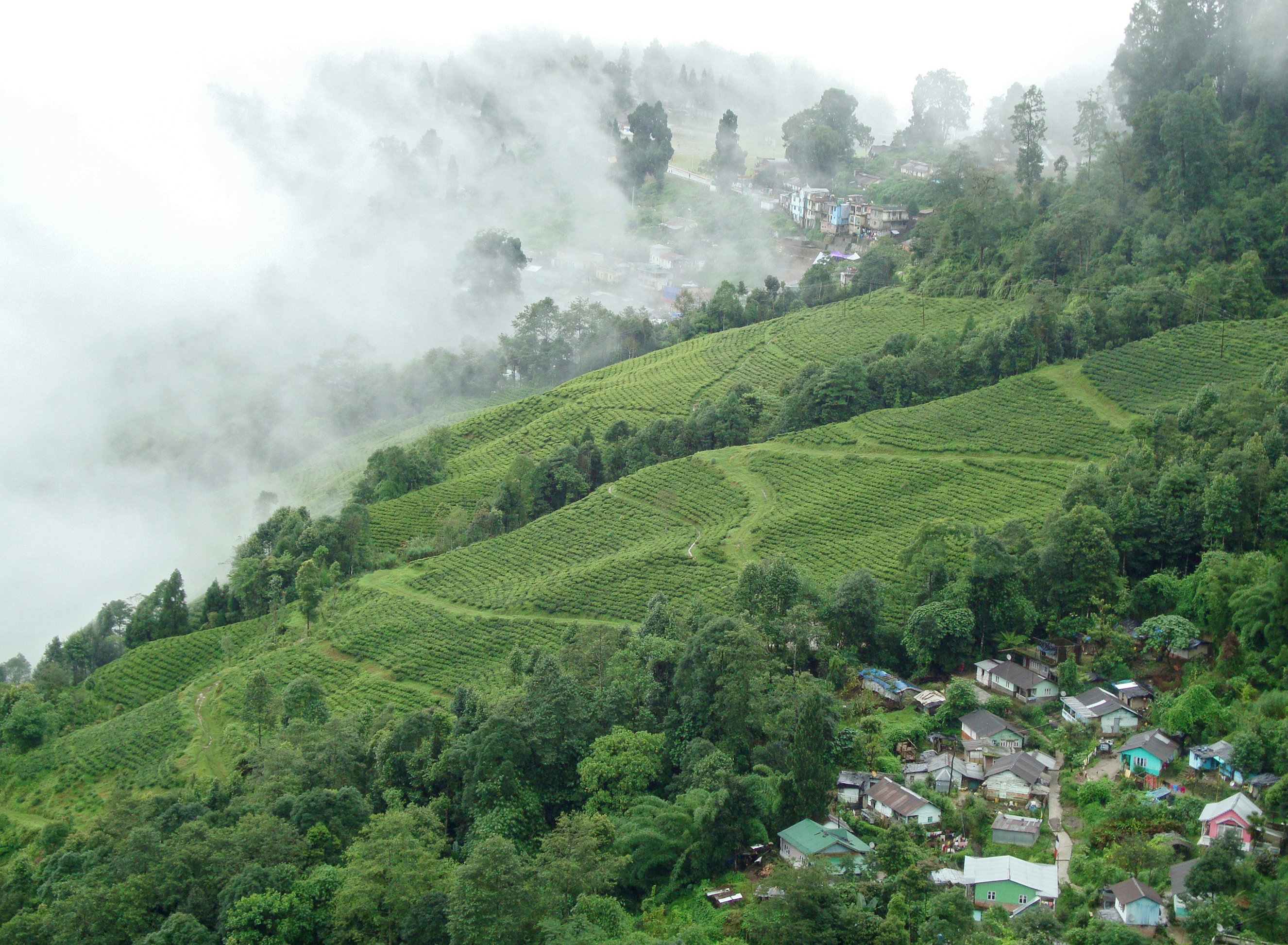
- Left to right from top: Darjeeling with Kangchenjunga, the world's third-highest mountain, rising behind it; a Darjeeling Himalayan Railway train en route to the main train station; a tea garden, or tea plantation
- Nickname: "Queen of the Hills"
- Interactive map of Darjeeling
- Coordinates: 27°02′15″N 88°15′47″E
- Country: India
- State: West Bengal
- Territorial Administration: Gorkhaland Territorial Administration
- District: Darjeeling
- Settled: Leased in 1835 from Tsugphud Namgyal, the Chogyal of the Kingdom of Sikkim, and annexed in 1849. Municipality, 1 July 1850.
- Founder: British East India Company, during Company rule in India

Government
  - Type: Municipality
  - Body: Darjeeling Municipality
  - Chairman: Dipen Thakuri

Area (Note: "In year 2001, the area of Darjeeling Municipality was 10.75 square kilometres (4.15 mi^{2}) but after the reorganization and bifurcation of wards in 2011, the town now covers an area of 7.43 square kilometres (2.87 mi^{2}) only.")
  - Total: 7.43 km^{2} (2.87 sq mi)
- Elevation (Note: "The average altitude of Darjeeling Town is 6710 ft (about 2045 m.) However, the highest point in the Darjeeling district is Sandakphu (close to 12,000 ft) which also happens to be the highest altitude point in the whole of West Bengal."): 2,045 m (6,709 ft)

Population (2011) (Note: India did not have a decadal census in 2021 because of COVID-19; the next one is a digital census planned for 2024.) (Note: "Population of the town experienced a rapid growth in the last fifty years, and Census of India (2011b) estimated the total population of the town is 118,805 persons (Tables 21.1 and 21.2).") (Note: "The density of population in Darjeeling town is 15,990 persons per sq.km as per 2011 census report.")
  - Total: 118,805
  - Density: 15,990/km^{2} (41,400/sq mi)

Languages
  - Official: Bengali and Nepali
- Time zone: UTC+5:30 (IST)

Darjeeling (/dɑːr.ˈdʒiː.lɪŋ/, Nepali: [ˈdard͡ziliŋ], Bengali: [ˈdarˌdʒiliŋ]) is a city in the northernmost region of the Indian state of West Bengal. Located in the Eastern Himalayas, it has an average elevation of 2,045 metres (6,709 ft). To the west of Darjeeling lies the easternmost province of Nepal, to the east the Kingdom of Bhutan, to the north the Indian state of Sikkim, and farther north the Tibet Autonomous Region of China. Bangladesh lies to the south and southeast, and most of the state of West Bengal lies to the south and southwest, connected to the Darjeeling region by a narrow tract. Kangchenjunga, the world's third-highest mountain, rises to the north and is prominently visible on clear days. (Note: "mist-enshrouded for half the year, on clear days the skyline is climaxed by the magnificent peak of Kangchenjunga".)

In the early 19th century, during East India Company rule in India, Darjeeling was identified as a potential summer retreat for British officials, soldiers, and their families. The narrow mountain ridge was leased from the Kingdom of Sikkim, and eventually annexed to British India. Experimentation with growing tea on the slopes below Darjeeling was highly successful. Thousands of labourers were recruited chiefly from Nepal to clear the forests, build European-style cottages and work in the tea plantations. The widespread deforestation displaced the indigenous peoples. Residential schools were established in and around Darjeeling for the education of children of the domiciled British in India. By the late-19th century, a novel narrow-gauge mountain railway, the Darjeeling Himalayan Railway, was bringing summer residents into the town and carrying a freight of tea out for export to the world. After India's independence in 1947, as the British left Darjeeling, its cottages were purchased by wealthy Indians from the plains and its tea plantations by out-of-town Indian business owners and conglomerates.

Darjeeling's population today is constituted largely of the descendants of the indigenous and immigrant labourers that were employed in the original development of the town. Although their common language, the Nepali language, has been given official recognition at the state and federal levels in India, the recognition has created little meaningful employment for the language's speakers nor has it increased their ability to have a significantly greater say in their political affairs. The tea industry and tourism are the mainstays of the town's economy. Deforestation in the region after India's independence has caused environmental damage, affecting the perennial springs that supply the town's water. The population of Darjeeling meanwhile has exploded over the years, and unregulated construction, traffic congestion and water shortages are common. Many young locals, educated in government schools, have taken to migrating out for the lack of jobs matching their skills. Like out-migrants from the neighbouring northeastern India, they have been subjected to discrimination and racism in some Indian cities.

Darjeeling's culture is highly cosmopolitan—a result of diverse ethnic groups intermixing and evolving away from their historical roots. The region's indigenous cuisine is rich in fermented foods and beverages. Tourists have flocked to Darjeeling since the mid-19th century. In 1999, after an international campaign for its support, the Darjeeling Himalayan Railway was declared a World Heritage Site by UNESCO. In 2005, Darjeeling tea was given geographical indication by the World Trade Organization as much for the protection of the brand as for the development of the region that produces it.

== Toponymy ==
At the time of the first British arrival, Darjeeling was known among its Lepcha inhabitants as Dorje-ling, or the "Place of the Thunderbolt". (Note: "Stories of Darjeeling's colonial founding are by now legion. In 1829, Captain George Lloyd and J.W. Grant were passing through Darjeeling en route to settle a border dispute between Sikkim and Nepal. The location was then known by local Lepcha peoples as Dorje-ling, or "Place of the Thunderbolt".) According to the Oxford Concise Dictionary of World Place Names, Darjeeling is derived from the Tibetan Dorje ling or Dorje-glin, meaning "Land of Dorje", i.e. of the vajra, the weapon of the Hindu god Indra.

== History ==
=== 1780 to 1835 ===
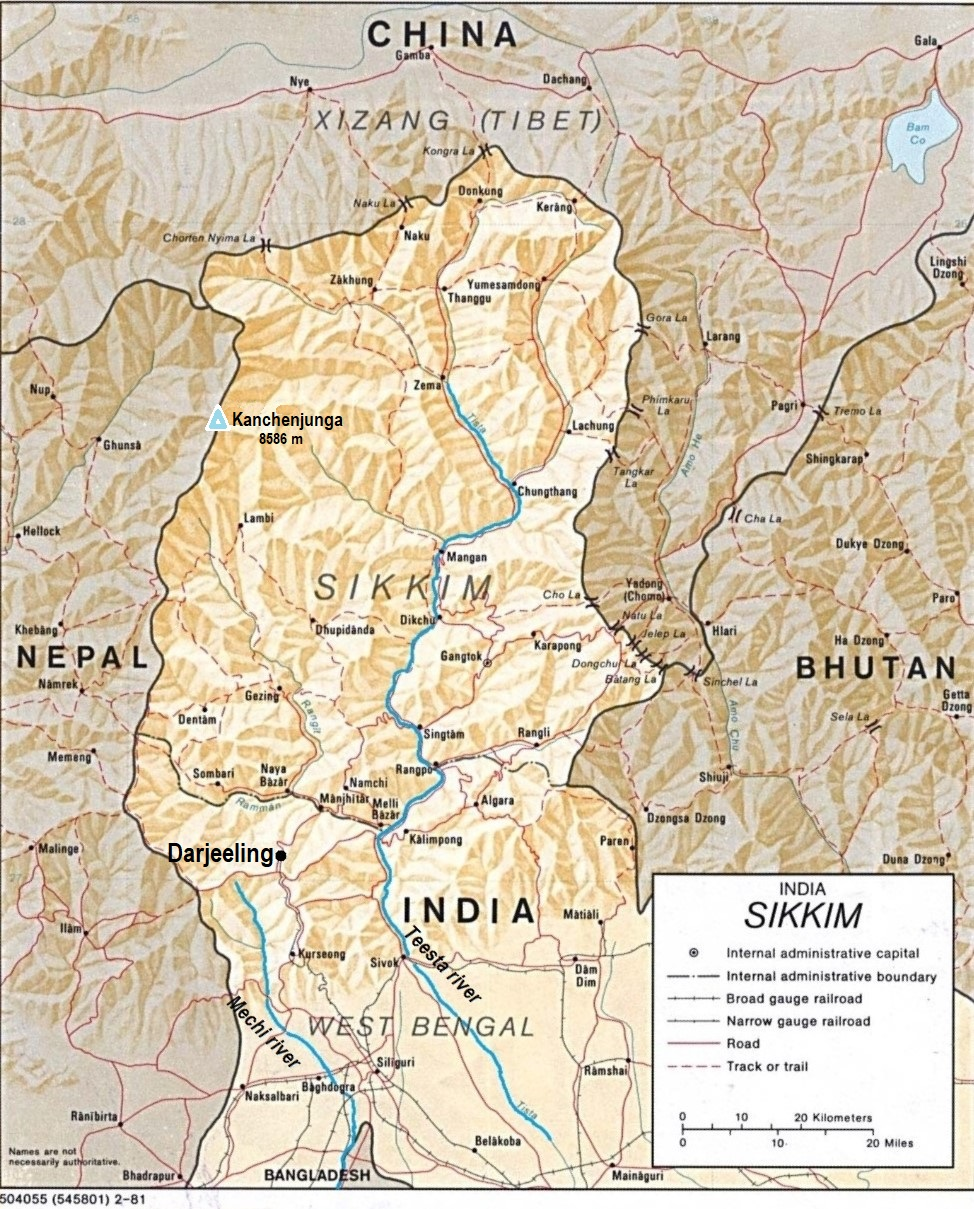
Darjeeling, Nepal, Bengal, Bhutan, Sikkim, and Tibet

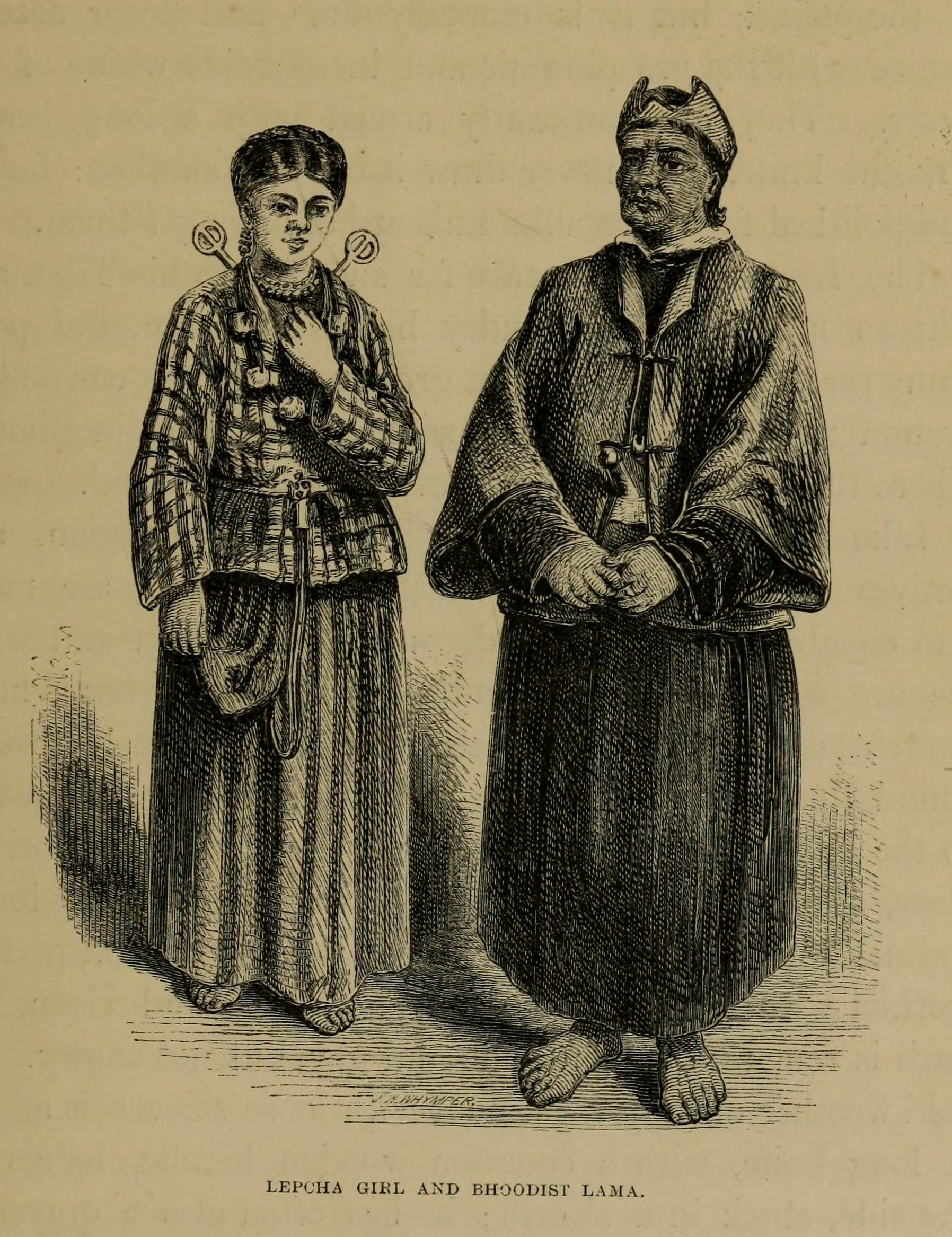
A Lepcha girl and a Buddhist lama in Dorjiling from Joseph Dalton Hooker's Himalayan Journals, volume I, 1854

Darjeeling lies between the Mechi and Teesta rivers in the Eastern Himalayas. In the 18th century, it was part of a boundary region that had stirred ambitions and insecurities in several South Asian states. For the greater part of the century, the Chogyal-ruler of the northern Kingdom of Sikkim had asserted possession of this territory. In the closing decades, the Gurkha kingdom of Nepal expanded eastwards to bring Darjeeling into its territory. Its army stopped short of the Teesta, beyond which at the time lay the Kingdom of Bhutan.

The English East India Company began to show an interest in the Darjeeling hills in the early 19th century. At the time Darjeeling's indigenous population largely consisted of the Lepcha and Limbu peoples. The Company's interference in territorial matters began in the aftermath of its army's victory over the Gurkhas in the Anglo-Nepalese War. Fought between 1814 and 1816, the war concluded with two treaties, the Treaty of Sugauli and the Treaty of Titalia, under which Nepal was required to return the Darjeeling territory to Sikkim.

In 1829, two East India Company officials, Captain George Lloyd and J. W. Grant, en route to resolving a boundary dispute between Nepal and Sikkim, passed a crescent-shaped mountain ridge which they fancied excellent for a sanitorium for the British, or a resort for sheltering and recuperating from the heat of India's plains. Lord William Bentinck, the Governor-General of India, to whom Lloyd communicated his notion, concurred, recommending a small presence of the army in addition for monitoring the frontier.

=== 1835–1857: East India Company rule ===
Taking the ambition forward, in 1835 the East India Company negotiated the lease of a 40 by 10 kilometres (24 by 6 miles) strip of land in a grant deed from the Chogyal. By the end of 1838, sappers from the army were readied for clearing the woods and construction planned in earnest after the monsoon rains. The following year, Archibald Campbell, a physician, was made "superintendent" of Darjeeling, and two public buildings, a hotel and a courthouse were raised. Soon, work had begun on bungalows that conformed to British tastes.

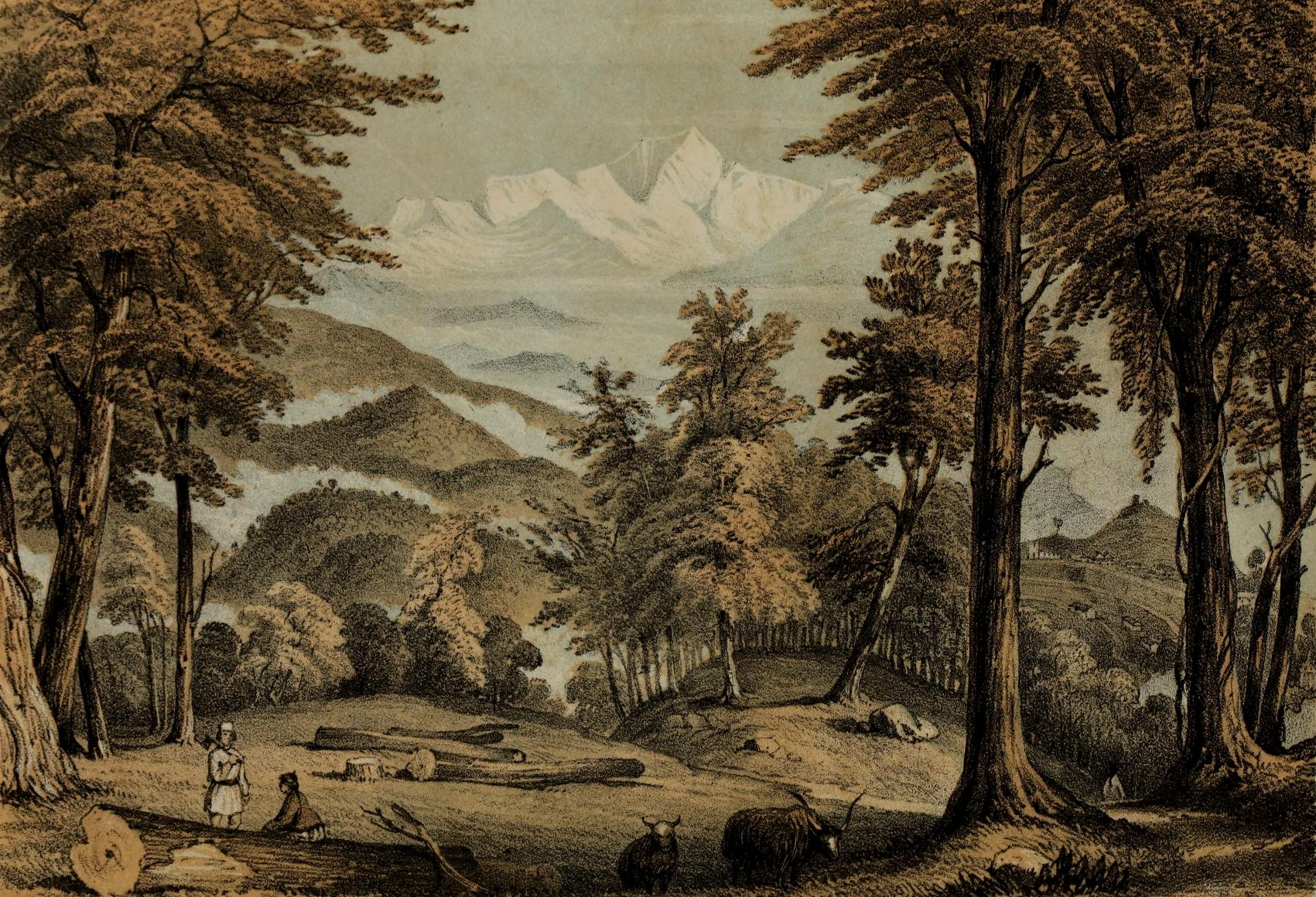
"View of Kinchinjunga from Mr. Hodgson's bungalow at Dorjiling from a sketch by W. Taylor Esq., B. C. S.," frontispiece, Joseph Dalton Hooker, Himalayan Journals, London: John Murray, 1854.

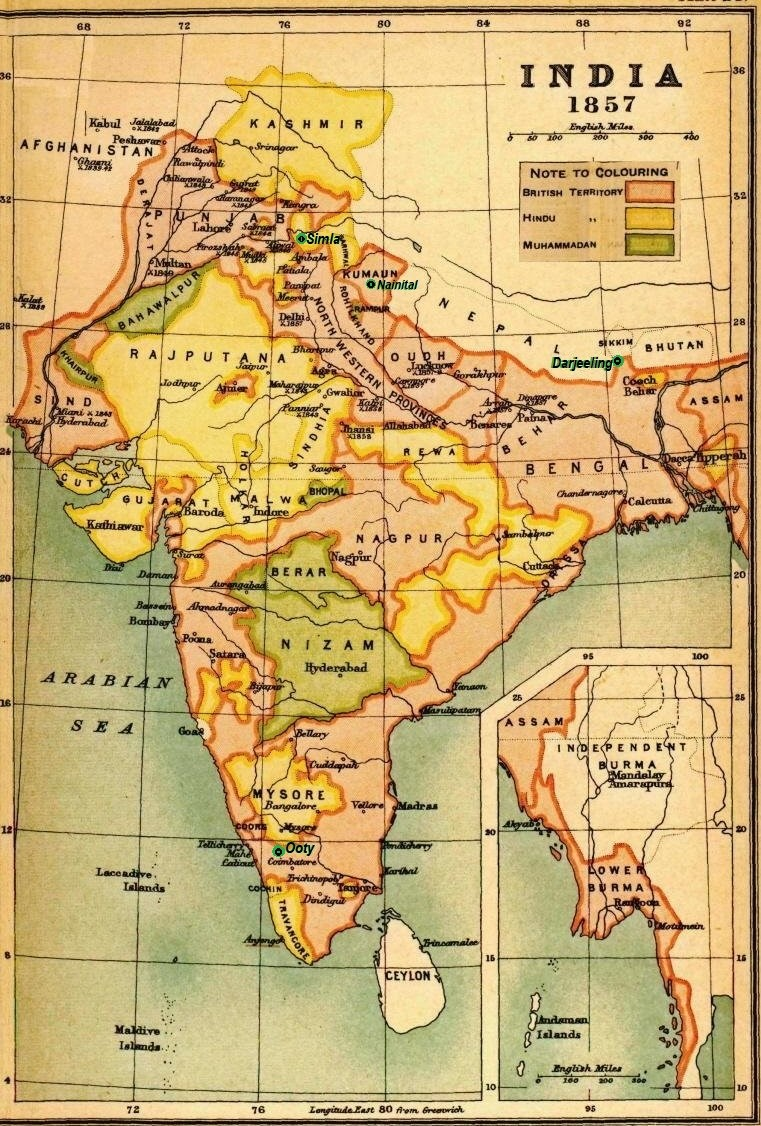
The Hill Stations and summer capitals at the end of East India Company rule (1857)

Turning Darjeeling into a resort required many more workers than were available in the scattered local populations. The British attracted workers from the neighbouring kingdoms, chiefly from Nepal but also from Sikkim and Bhutan. They did so by offering regular wages and lodgings, a contrast to the burdensome tax and forced labour regimens common in those kingdoms at the time. Tens of thousands arrived in Darjeeling. Not long after the Darjeeling Hill Cart Road was built in Northern Bengal, connecting Siliguri at the base of the Himalayan foothills to Darjeeling.

In 1833 the East India Company lost its monopoly rights in the tea trade with China. A plan was prepared for growing tea in India. Superintendent Campbell began experimentation in 1840 in Darjeeling which soon proved successful. European planters and sponsors acquired large stretches of the surrounding hillside and converted them to plantations, called tea gardens. Existing tracks and paths in the hills were improved, renamed as roads, and connected to the Hill Cart Road. The botanist Joseph Dalton Hooker, who visited Darjeeling in the 1840s, noted that carts and pack animals on these roads were bringing fruit and produce from Nepal, wool and salt from Tibet, and labourers looking for work from just about everywhere.

The labour migrations created a burgeoning hostility between the East India Company and the neighbouring Himalayan kingdoms. By 1849 the hostility came to a head. Campbell and Hooker were allegedly kidnapped. Despite the two being released without harm, the British exploited the incident to annex some 1,700 square kilometres (640 mi^{2}) of territory between the Mechi and the Teesta rivers from Sikkim.

Darjeeling became a municipality in 1850. In the span of 15 years, this Himalayan tract had become a hill station, an official retreat for British administrators in a hilly, temperate region of India. Hill stations, such as Simla (summer capital of the British Indian Empire), Ooty (summer capital of the Madras Presidency), and Nainital (summer capital of the North-Western Provinces) were all established between 1819 and the 1840s, a period during which the rule of the East India Company had spread to the greater part of the Indian subcontinent and the British felt confident about planning them. Darjeeling later became the summer capital of the Bengal Presidency.

=== 1858–1947: British Raj ===
From 1850 to 1870 the tea industry in Darjeeling grew to 56 tea gardens employing some 8,000 labourers. The tea gardens' security forces kept a close watch on the labourers and used coercion when necessary to maintain intensive production. The labourers' disparate cultural and ethnic backgrounds and the tea gardens' commonly remote locations ensured the absence of worker mobilization. By the turn of the 20th century, 100 tea gardens employed an estimated 64,000 workers, and more than five million pound sterling were invested in Darjeeling tea. The widespread deforestation caused by the tea industry drastically changed the lives of the region's forest dwellers, who were either forced to relocate to other forests or become employed in their former habitat in new colonial occupations. To the mix of the forest dwellers recruited, more labourers joined from across the Himalayas. They communicated with each other in the Nepali language. Later the language, and their customs and traditions would create the distinctive ethnicity of Darjeeling, called Indian Gorkha.

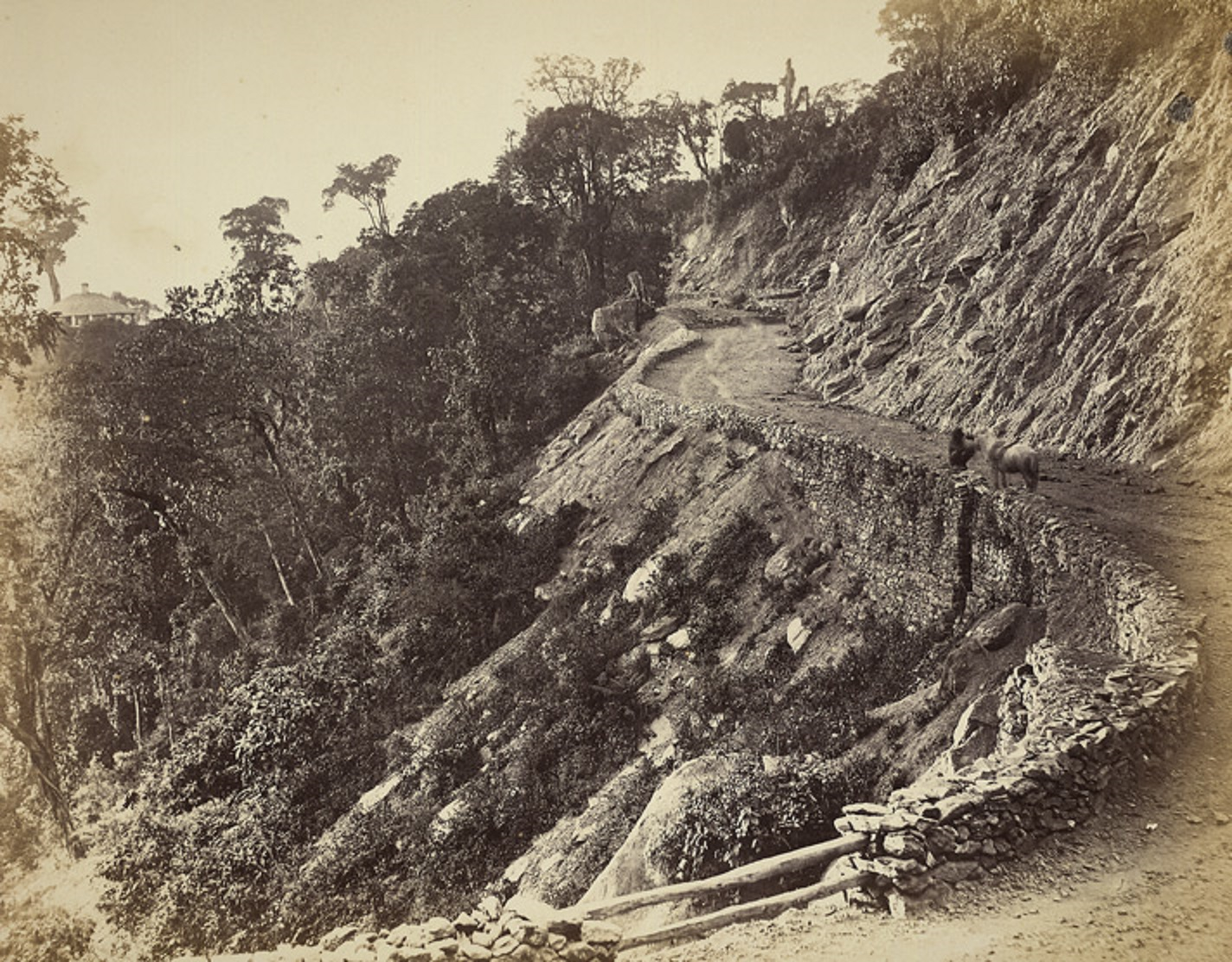
Hill Cart Road, shown in 1865

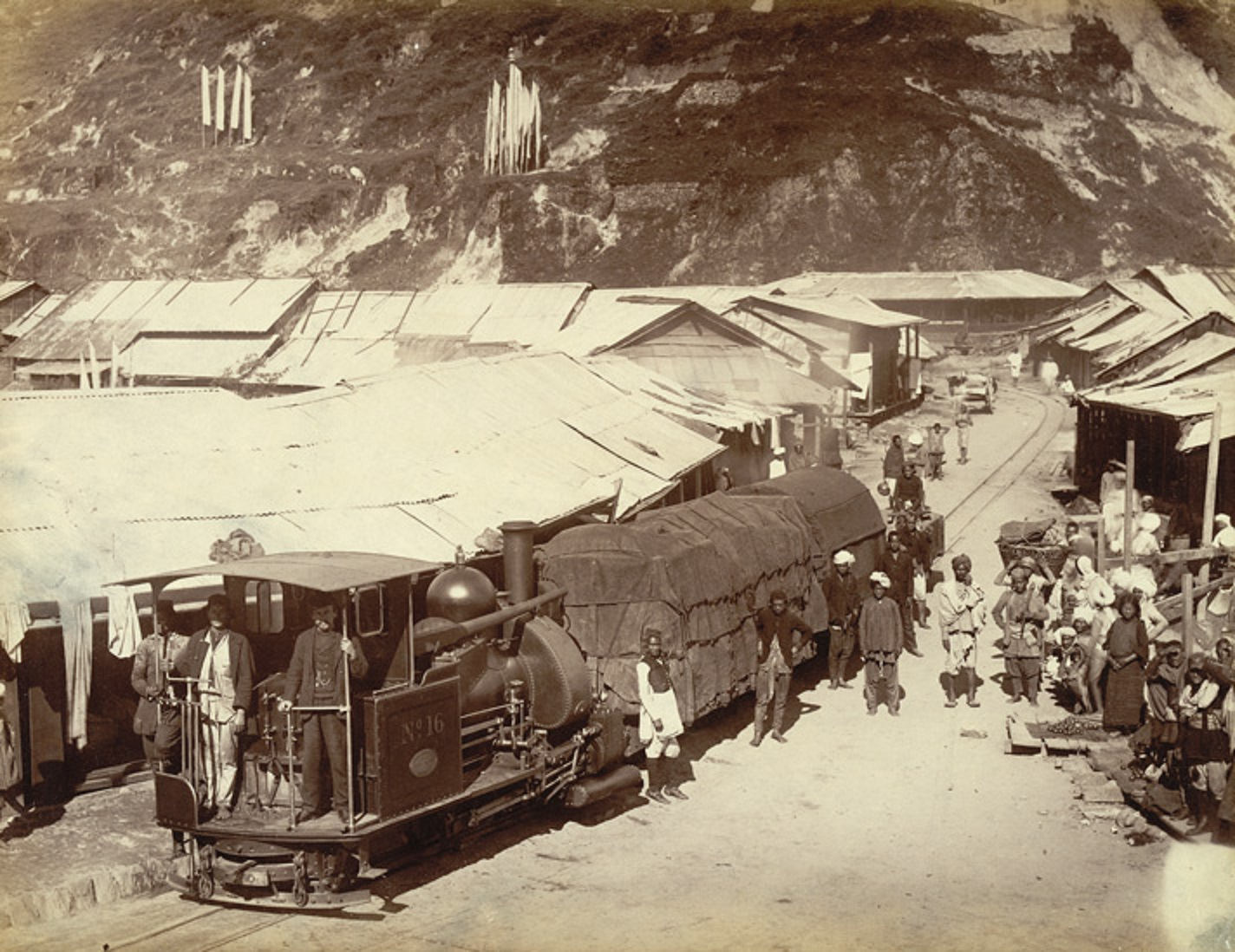
Darjeeling Railway in a village, 1880

By the last decades of the 19th century, large numbers of administrative officials of the imperial and British Raj provincial governments had begun to travel to hill stations during the summers. Commerce in the stations had grown as had the trade with the plains. A train service to Darjeeling was announced in 1872. By 1878 trains could take summer residents from Calcutta, the capital of the British Indian Empire, to Siliguri at the base of the Darjeeling hills. Thereafter, Tonga horse-carriages were required to cover the last stretch on the Hill Cart Road. Ascending some 1,900-metre (6,300 ft), the journey required stopping at "halting barracks", or stables for feeding or changing the horses. By 1880, railway tracks were being aligned along the Hill Cart Road, and the East Indian Railway Company Jamalpur Locomotive Workshop had begun to build steam locomotives for the route. Miniature steam engines made by Sharp, Stewart and Company of Manchester, were employed for pulling the train on a narrow gauge of two feet. The train service to Darjeeling was opened in July 1881. After cresting at the Ghoom railway station at 2,300-metre (7,500 ft) above sea level, the train made a descent to Darjeeling. Darjeeling was now within a day's travel from Calcutta.

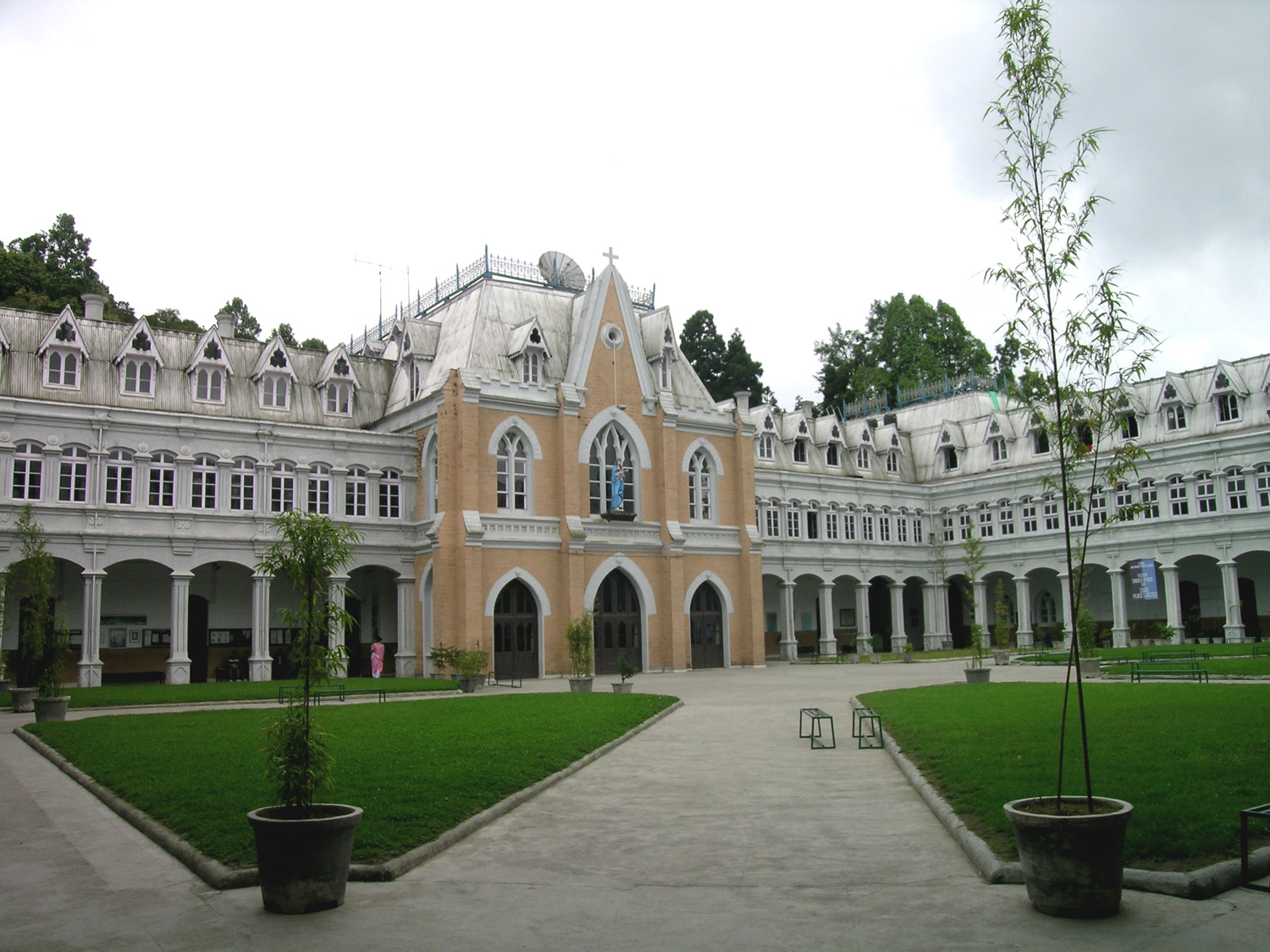
The quadrangle of St Joseph's College, Darjeeling, now St Joseph's School, or North Point, established in 1888

Education became another aspect of Darjeeling's notability by the turn of the 20th century. After the Charter Act 1833, which allowed unrestricted immigration, British women had begun to arrive in India in significantly more numbers than before. Hill stations became popular summer destinations for women and children as colonial physicians recommended them for improved maternal and infant health. The British soon began to consider hill stations promising sites for primary and secondary education. St Paul's, an Anglican boys' school in Calcutta, was moved to Darjeeling in 1864. The Catholic Church opened St Joseph's College for boys in Darjeeling in 1888. For girls, the Loreto Convent had already been established during Company rule; the Calcutta Christian Schools Society established the Queen's Hill School in Darjeeling in 1895. Anglo-Indians (of mixed British and Indian ancestry) were discouraged from attending the better-known schools and Indians were almost always prohibited until after World War I.

In 1945, as the British Raj was drawing towards a close, the Nepalese-speaking Indian Gorkha residents of Darjeeling had not been granted rights as British Indian subjects. These residents were at the bottom of the economic ladder, and their physical appearance was now the occasional object of racism by Indians from the plains. The 1941 census had shown that the Gorkha in Darjeeling constituted 86% of the population. They made up 96% of the labour force in the tea gardens. Many had been recruited to fight for the British in the Second World War, but the British had been reluctant to displease the governments of Nepal and the Kingdom of Sikkim whose feudal labour regimes many original migrants had sought to escape.

=== 1947 onwards: independent India ===
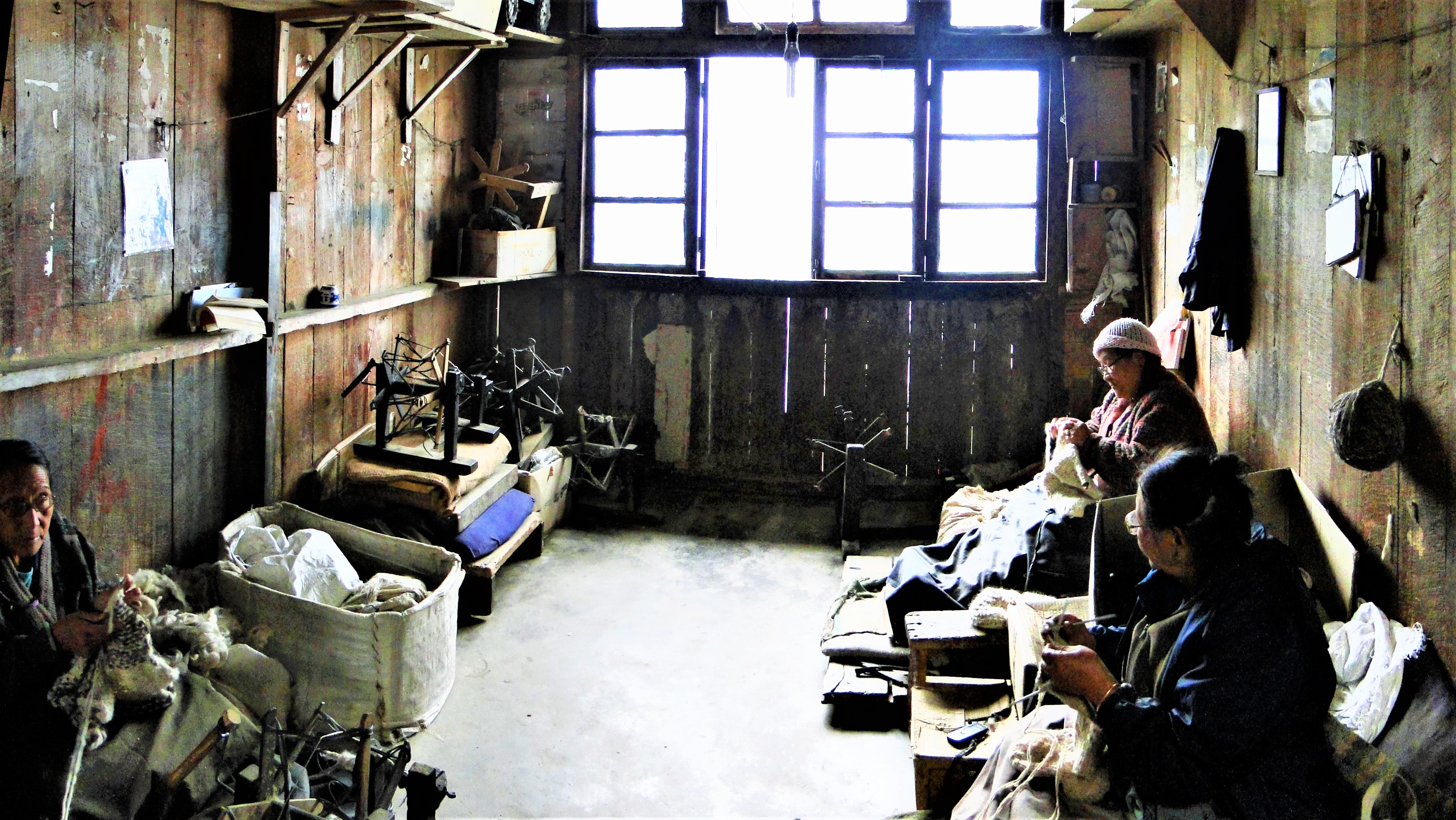
Tibetan women knitting at the Tibetan Refugee Self-Help Centre, Darjeeling, established 1959

After the partition of India in 1947, Darjeeling became a part of the new province of West Bengal in the Dominion of India, and in 1950, of the state of West Bengal in the Republic of India. (Note: East Bengal, now Bangladesh, which lies to the south of Darjeeling and extends southwards to the Bay of Bengal, was awarded to Pakistan.) A British exodus from Darjeeling quickly followed. Their cottages were quickly purchased by the Indian upper classes from the plains who enrolled their children in the town's many schools. These actions created social and economic tensions with the Indian Gorkha population and further marginalised the latter. Their lack of economic development, caused by a hierarchal economic system set up by the British, continued in some respects in the immediate decades after 1947. The Indian nationalism that emerged seemed to highlight the unclear position of the Indian Nepalis in the newly independent nation. The division of India into states comprising the regions of its different spoken languages had allowed a relatively large proportion of the educated speakers of these languages to find employment in the government-owned enterprises. In the instance of the Gorkhas, the federal and state governments refused to accept their requests for their own Nepali-speaking state in the northern regions of Bengal. Eventually, the demands for autonomy were downsized to calls for the recognition of the Nepali language for official state business in Nepali-speaking regions of Bengal. This was accepted in the West Bengal Official Language Act, 1961.

Darjeeling had a sizeable community of Sherpas, an ethnic group, originally from eastern Tibet whose ancestors had moved to some villages in Nepal below Mount Everest. Sherpas had come to Darjeeling in the second half of the 19th century as seasonal labourers looking for work in road-building. As mountaineering in the Himalayas had gained popularity and Nepal was closed to foreigners, many Western mountaineers and enthusiasts came to Darjeeling to plan their Himalayan expeditions. The Sherpas stood out for their exceptional physical ability as porters, their fitness eliciting visits to Darjeeling by European biochemists in the early 1900s. Among the most famous Sherpas who moved to Darjeeling were Ang Tharkay and Tenzing Norgay. On 29 May 1953, Tenzing and Edmund Hillary became the first two humans to stand atop Mount Everest, vaulting both to instant stardom worldwide. The prime minister of India, Jawaharlal Nehru, took Tenzing under his wing. Tenzing became the first field director of the Himalayan Mountaineering Institute after it was established in Darjeeling in November 1954

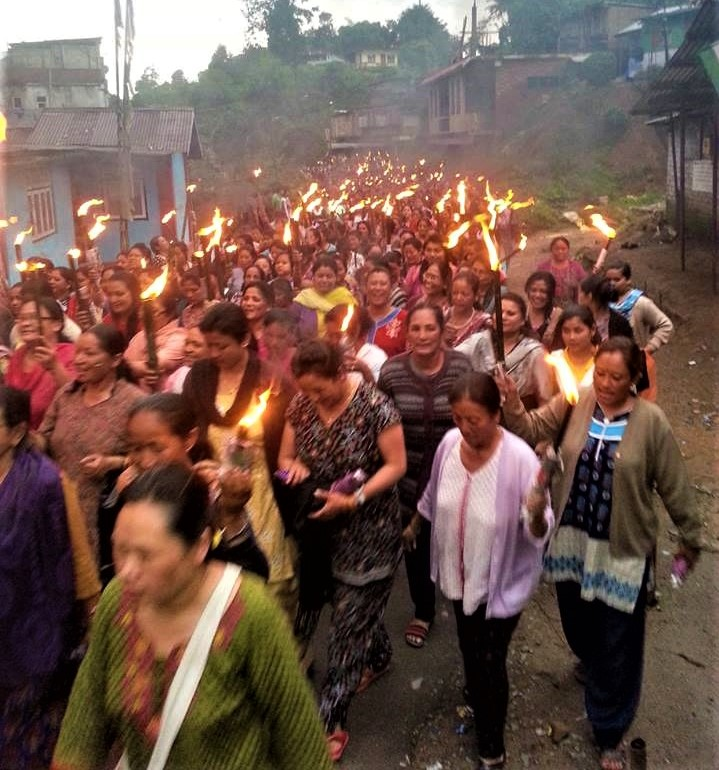
Women supporting Gorkhaland marching with torchlights, Darjeeling, 2013

A trickle of immigrants from Tibet proper into Darjeeling had begun in the second half of the 19th century. Wealthy Tibetan aristocrats had sent their children to Darjeeling's schools, and some went on to settle in the Darjeeling area. After the annexation of Tibet by the People's Republic of China in 1950–1951, many Tibetans emigrated to India, with some settling in the Darjeeling area, including the 14th Dalai Lama's older brother Gyalo Thondup. After the 1959 Tibetan uprising, the Dalai Lama himself fled to exile in India, and tens of thousands of Tibetan refugees poured in after him, with many finding refuge in the Darjeeling–Kalimpong area. A Tibetan Refugee Self-Help Centre was established in Darjeeling in 1959.

In May 1975, the Kingdom of Sikkim to the north of Darjeeling was absorbed into the Republic of India through a referendum. A month thereafter, Sikkim, in which nearly two-thirds of the populace spoke Nepali, was made a state of India. It was not lost on the Gorkhas of the Darjeeling region that there were many more speakers of Nepali in the Gorkha districts of northern Bengal, and their calls for autonomy had borne no fruit. The Government of India, moreover, had been reluctant to recognise Nepali as an official language in the Constitution of India. Slights delivered by senior Indian leadership around this issue—Morarji Desai, a former prime minister calling Nepali a foreign language, and Vallabhbhai Patel, a former deputy prime minister, describing the Gorkhas as disloyal and entertaining "Mongoloid prejudices"—were all remembered. A decade later, during Rajiv Gandhi's prime ministership, small regions in Assam to the east of Darjeeling, which had been riven by violent ethnic separatism, were granted statehood. All these factors played into creating a militant mood among the Gorkhas for statehood and brought the Gorkhaland movement to the forefront. It led to the founding of the Gorkha National Liberation Front (GNLF) under the leadership of Subhas Ghising. Agitation for a separate state in Darjeeling included violent protests, and fighting between the disparate militant groups. The agitation ceased after an agreement was reached between the government and the Gorkha National Liberation Front (GNLF). It resulted in the establishment of an elected body in 1988, the Darjeeling Gorkha Hill Council (DGHC), which received some autonomy to govern the district.

In 1992, the Nepali language was recognized officially at the federal level in India by inclusion in the Indian Constitution. Though Darjeeling became peaceful, the issue of a separate state lingered. Agitation for a new state again erupted in 2008, led by the Gorkha Janmukti Morcha (GJM). In July 2011, a pact was signed between GJM, the state and national governments which included an elected Gorkhaland Territorial Administration (GTA), with limited autonomy within the state of West Bengal. It evoked little enthusiasm on the streets. In 2013, fresh agitation broke out in Darjeeling after Telangana, a region in southern India was granted statehood. Four years later, more agitation caused several months of violence, food shortages, and strikes in Darjeeling but resulted in the Morcha splitting into factions. In 2017, Mamata Banerjee, the West Bengal chief minister, appointed a moderate Morcha politician to leadership in a reconstituted GTA, marginalizing and eventually ousting the founder of the movement, Bimal Gurung.

== Geography and geology ==
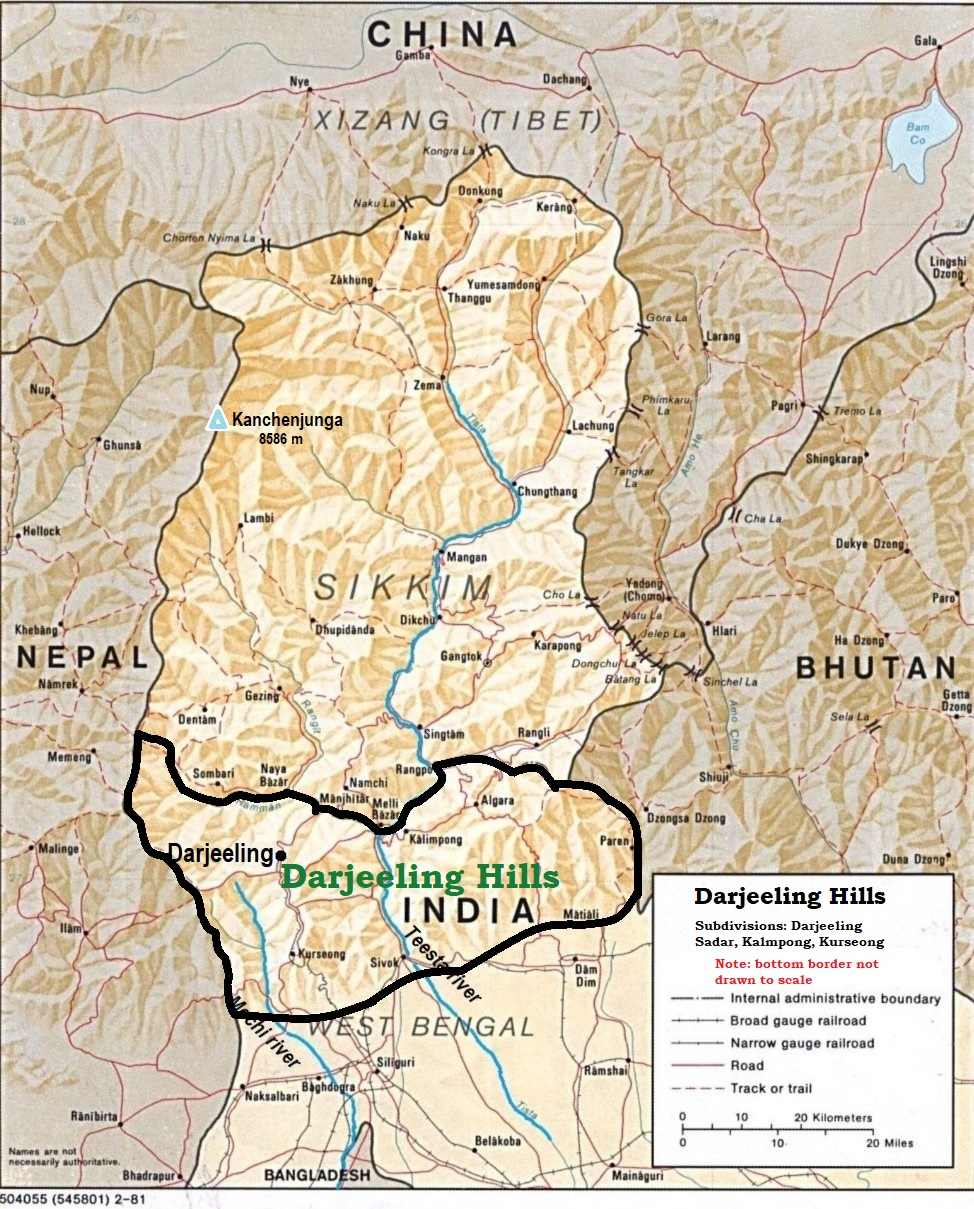
Darjeeling Hills showing Darjeeling, Kalimpong, and Kurseong, the headquarters of the three hill subdivisions

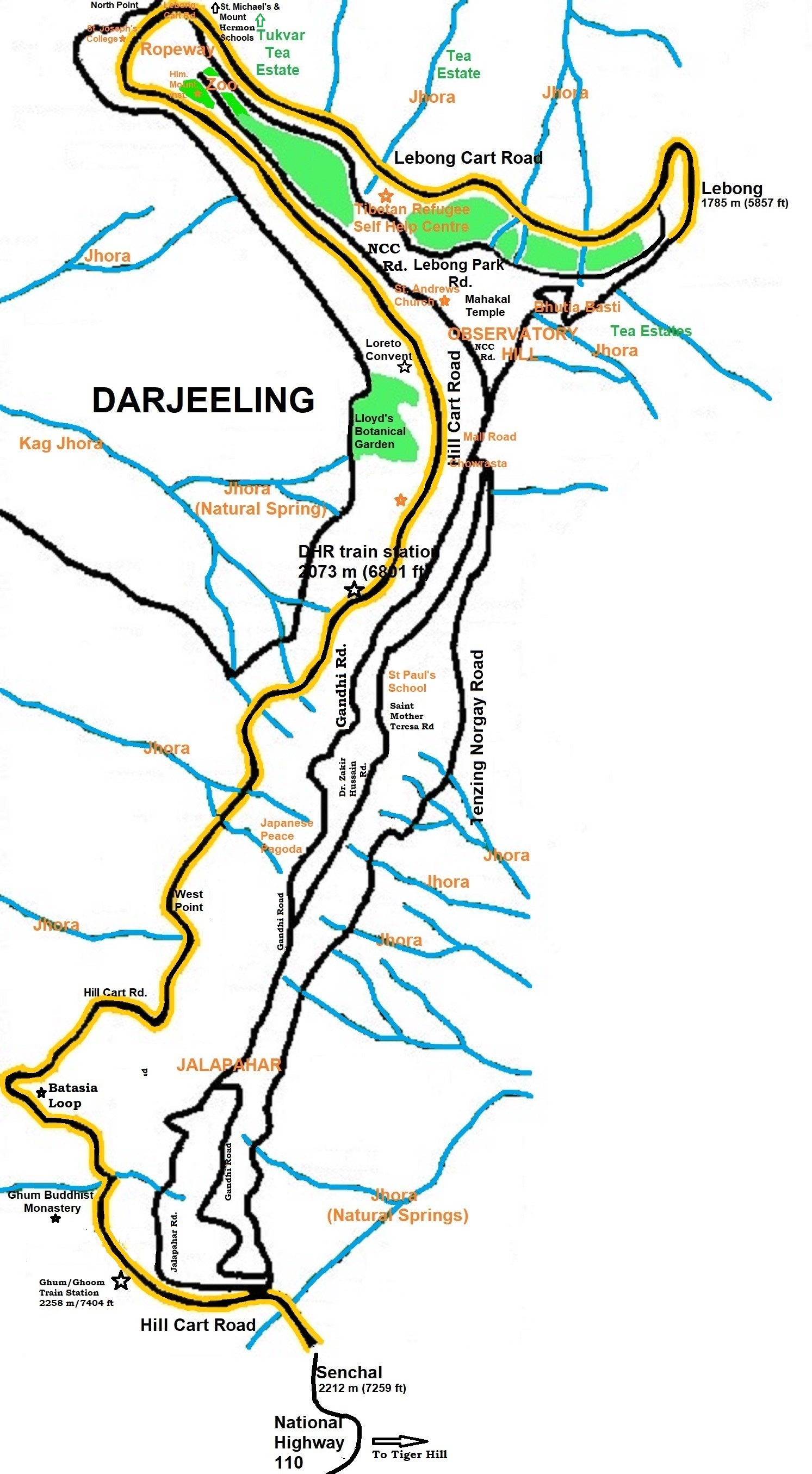
Map 1: Darjeeling municipality, showing the ridges on which the town was settled

The Darjeeling hills (formally Darjeeling Himalayan hill region) comprise parts of Darjeeling district and all of Kalimpong district; specifically, they contain: Darjeeling Sadar subdivision, Kalimpong subdivision and Kurseong subdivision. Darjeeling town lies in the Sadar subdivision. It is located at an average elevation of 2,045 m (6,709 ft) on the Darjeeling–Jalapahar range which runs south to north starting at Ghum (Map 1). The range is Y-shaped with its base resting at Katapahar and Jalapahar and two arms diverging north of the Observatory Hill. The north-eastern arm dips swiftly and ends in the Lebong spur, while the north-western arm slopes gently, passing through North Point, and ends in the valley near the Tukver Tea Estate. Kangchenjunga, the world's third-highest peak at 8,598 m (28,209 ft), which lies 74.4 kilometres (46.2 mi) to the north, is the most prominent mountain visible.

The Darjeeling hills have been formed by accumulations of folds, faults and tangential thrusts caused by a compression in the north–south direction as the Indian tectonic plate has subducted under the Eurasian plate. Their physical composition varies from unaltered sedimentary rocks in the southern regions to several types of metamorphic rock and some intrusive rocks in the middle and northern, suggesting upward intrusion of the Earth's mantle. The collective process has sheared, folded, crushed together, fractured and jointed the rocks, reducing their strength and making them vulnerable to water percolating down their crevices and causing pore water pressure to build up. Phyllites and schists are found in the hills around Kalimpong, which lies to the east, and gneiss predominates the western regions in which Darjeeling lies.

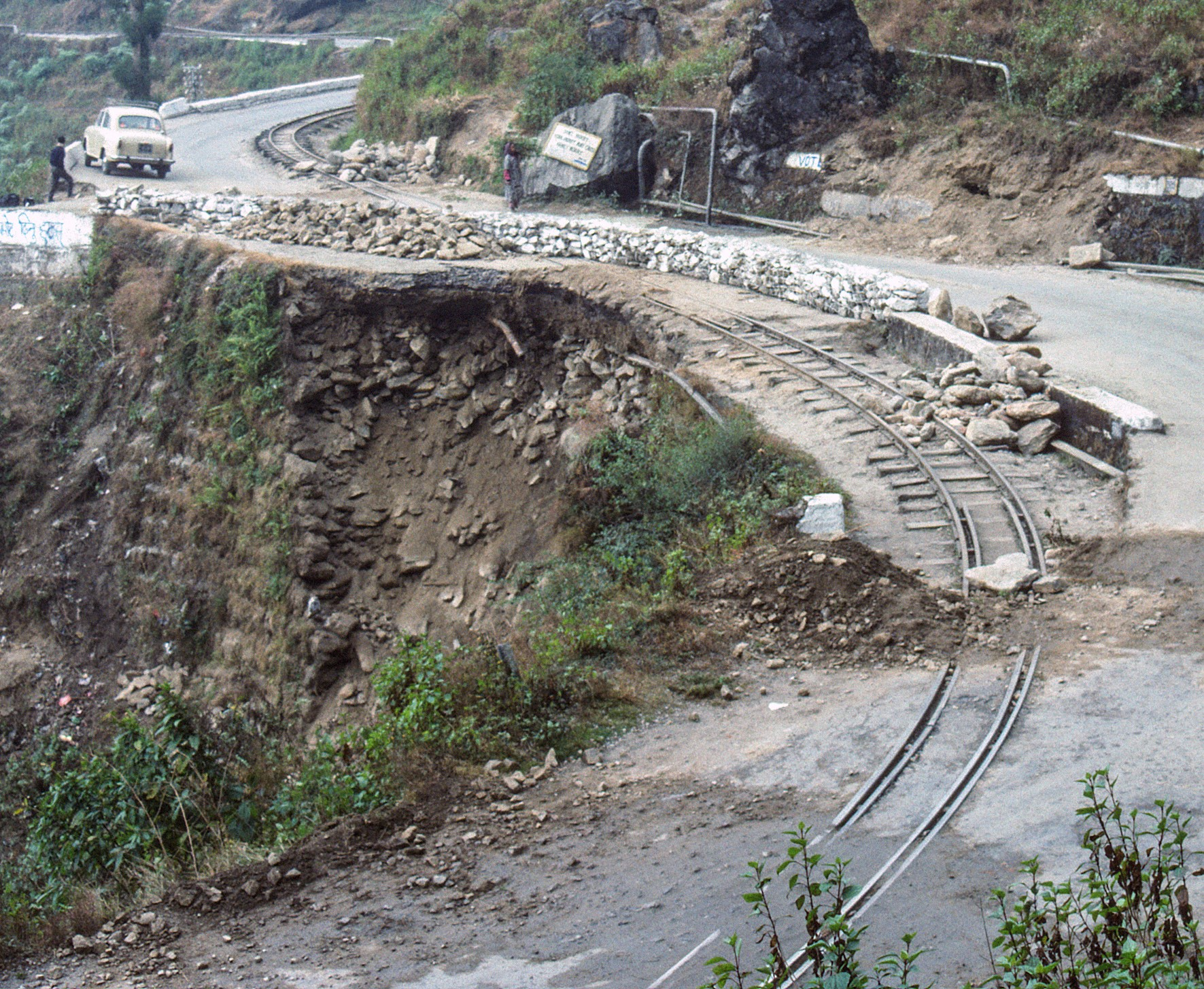
Landslide, Darjeeling Siliguri Road, 1993

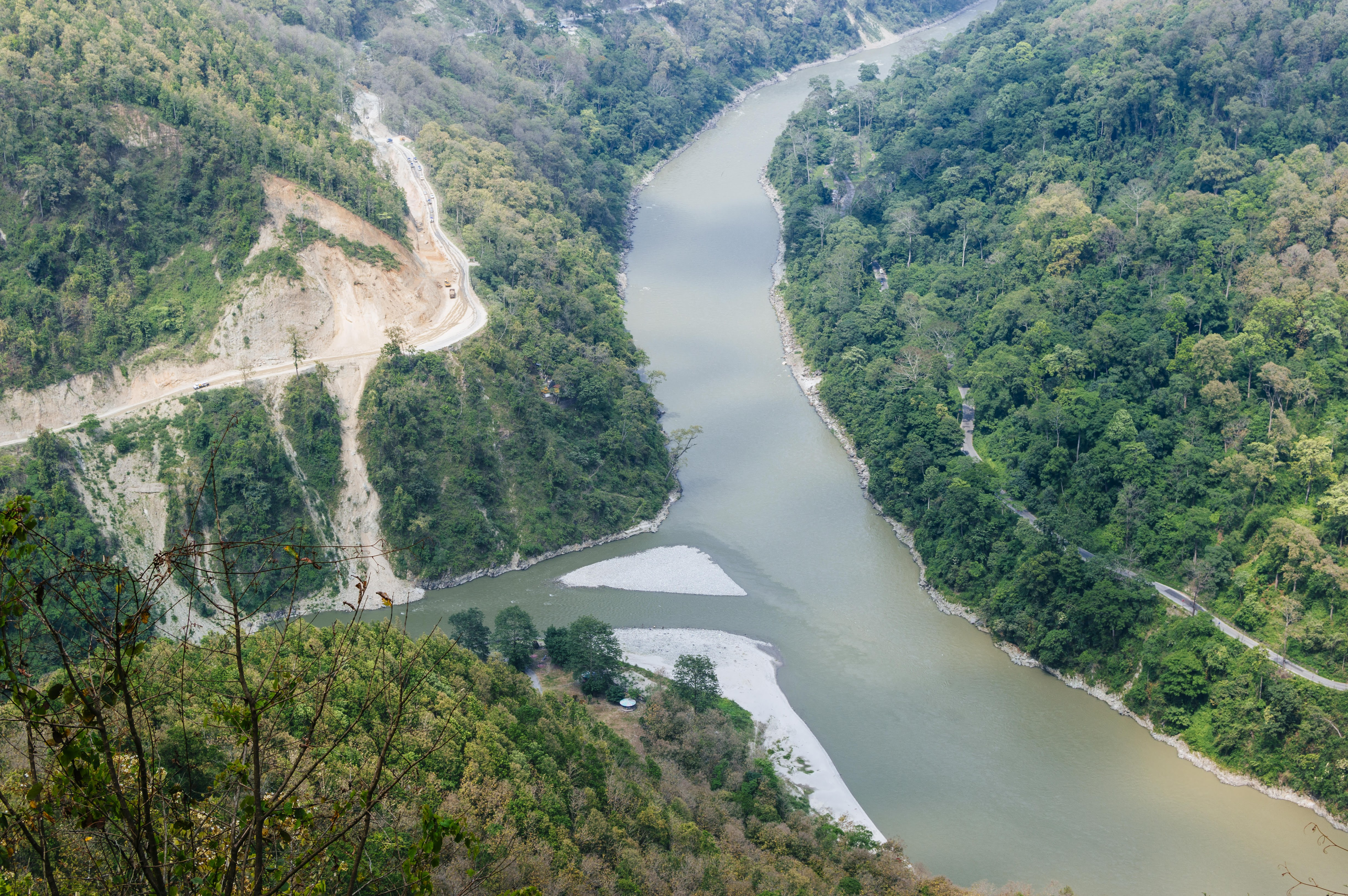
The Teesta, flowing south, meets the Rangeet on its right

Two studies (1990 and 2019) recorded that landslides were a serious concern in the area. Most are triggered by excessive rainfall, earthquakes, and quick erosion caused by torrents. They are accelerated by extensive deforestation, defective drainage, poorly built revetments and the presence of steep slopes that have been undercut to make shelves for paths, roads, and houses. Debris flows along existing gullies can sometimes bring along large boulders and cause damage to roads; in 1968, during a catastrophic rainstorm, the 56 kilometres (35 mi) Darjeeling–Siliguri road was cut in 92 places by debris flows.

Teesta, the major river of the Darjeeling region, rises at 6,300 metres (20,700 ft) from a glacier in Sikkim, and flows south, at first meeting the Rangpo river and then the Rangeet before exiting the hills and eventually joining the Brahmaputra River in Bangladesh. The flow rate of the Teesta is 1,500 cubic metres (53,000 cu ft) per second during the summer monsoon; it had had major floods in 1950 and 1968.

The continual tectonic activity of Darjeeling's ancient past can be inferred from the surrounding landscape in such features as terraces that dip in their middle as a result of earlier horizontal pressure. Eroded fault scarps, or steps, observed in the landscape were caused by vertical slips in the faults below. Alluvial fans at different heights signify a succession of previous rivers that dried up and spread their silt outwards as their beds were raised by the uplift. According to the Bureau of Indian Standards, Darjeeling town falls under seismic zone-IV (on a scale of I to V, in order of increasing proneness to earthquakes). A study published in 2018 found that residents of Darjeeling's outer areas, which are lower-income and lower-lying, worried about catastrophic loss during an earthquake. The April 2015 Nepal earthquake was felt in Darjeeling, and these residents feared that in the instance of a major earthquake, the unplanned upper-level construction could very well give way and tumble down on them.

== Climate and environment ==
=== Climate ===
Darjeeling has a temperate subtropical highland climate (Köppen climate classification: Cwb). The average annual precipitation in Darjeeling is approximately 3,100 mm (120 in). (Note: It is 3,122 mm (122.9 in), according to one source and 3,082 millimetres (121.3 in) according to another.) Eighty percent of the annual rainfall takes place between the months of June and September, due to the monsoon of South Asia. The "June–May ratio", or the percentage by which the rain increases from May to June, is 2.6 or 260%. In contrast, just 3% of the annual rainfall takes place between December and March. Darjeeling's altitude—which is greater than some other regions of the Eastern Himalayas at the same latitude (27° N), such as the Assam hills—and its rarified air causes its UV radiation levels to be correspondingly higher. Its mean monthly UV radiance is approximately 4500 microwatts per square cm per day during the peak months of May, June, and July. It is 50% higher than the Assam hills to the east, whose altitude is 170 metres (560 ft).

Climate data for Darjeeling, elevation 2,128 m (6,982 ft), (1991–2020, extremes 1901–2020)
Month	Jan	Feb	Mar	Apr	May	Jun	Jul	Aug	Sep	Oct	Nov	Dec	Year
Record high °C (°F)	19.0 (66.2)	19.2 (66.6)	25.1 (77.2)	27.0 (80.6)	25.7 (78.3)	27.7 (81.9)	28.0 (82.4)	28.5 (83.3)	27.5 (81.5)	26.0 (78.8)	25.0 (77.0)	23.0 (73.4)	28.5 (83.3)
Mean daily maximum °C (°F)	11.1 (52.0)	12.4 (54.3)	15.9 (60.6)	18.6 (65.5)	19.3 (66.7)	19.8 (67.6)	19.5 (67.1)	19.9 (67.8)	19.5 (67.1)	19.4 (66.9)	17.2 (63.0)	13.7 (56.7)	17.3 (63.1)
Mean daily minimum °C (°F)	1.7 (35.1)	3.1 (37.6)	6.0 (42.8)	9.0 (48.2)	10.8 (51.4)	12.8 (55.0)	13.4 (56.1)	13.5 (56.3)	12.7 (54.9)	9.9 (49.8)	6.2 (43.2)	3.5 (38.3)	8.8 (47.8)
Record low °C (°F)	−7.2 (19.0)	−6.4 (20.5)	−4.8 (23.4)	0.0 (32.0)	1.4 (34.5)	6.6 (43.9)	3.9 (39.0)	8.0 (46.4)	6.2 (43.2)	3.2 (37.8)	−4.4 (24.1)	−4.6 (23.7)	−7.2 (19.0)
Average rainfall mm (inches)	10.8 (0.43)	11.4 (0.45)	26.4 (1.04)	89.0 (3.50)	160.3 (6.31)	419.1 (16.50)	648.5 (25.53)	529.8 (20.86)	385.2 (15.17)	78.8 (3.10)	11.2 (0.44)	2.8 (0.11)	2,373.3 (93.44)
Average rainy days	0.9	1.2	2.6	6.7	10.2	17.9	23.4	22.0	16.1	3.9	0.6	0.7	106.1
Average relative humidity (%) (at 17:30 IST)	82	78	79	82	90	94	95	94	92	84	78	80	86
Mean monthly sunshine hours	167.4	139.8	145.7	147.0	151.9	72.0	77.5	102.3	96.0	167.4	189.0	189.1	1,645.1
Mean daily sunshine hours	5.4	5.0	4.7	4.9	4.9	2.4	2.5	3.3	3.2	5.4	6.3	6.1	4.5
Source 1: India Meteorological Department
Source 2: Deutscher Wetterdienst (sun 1891–1990)

=== Environment ===
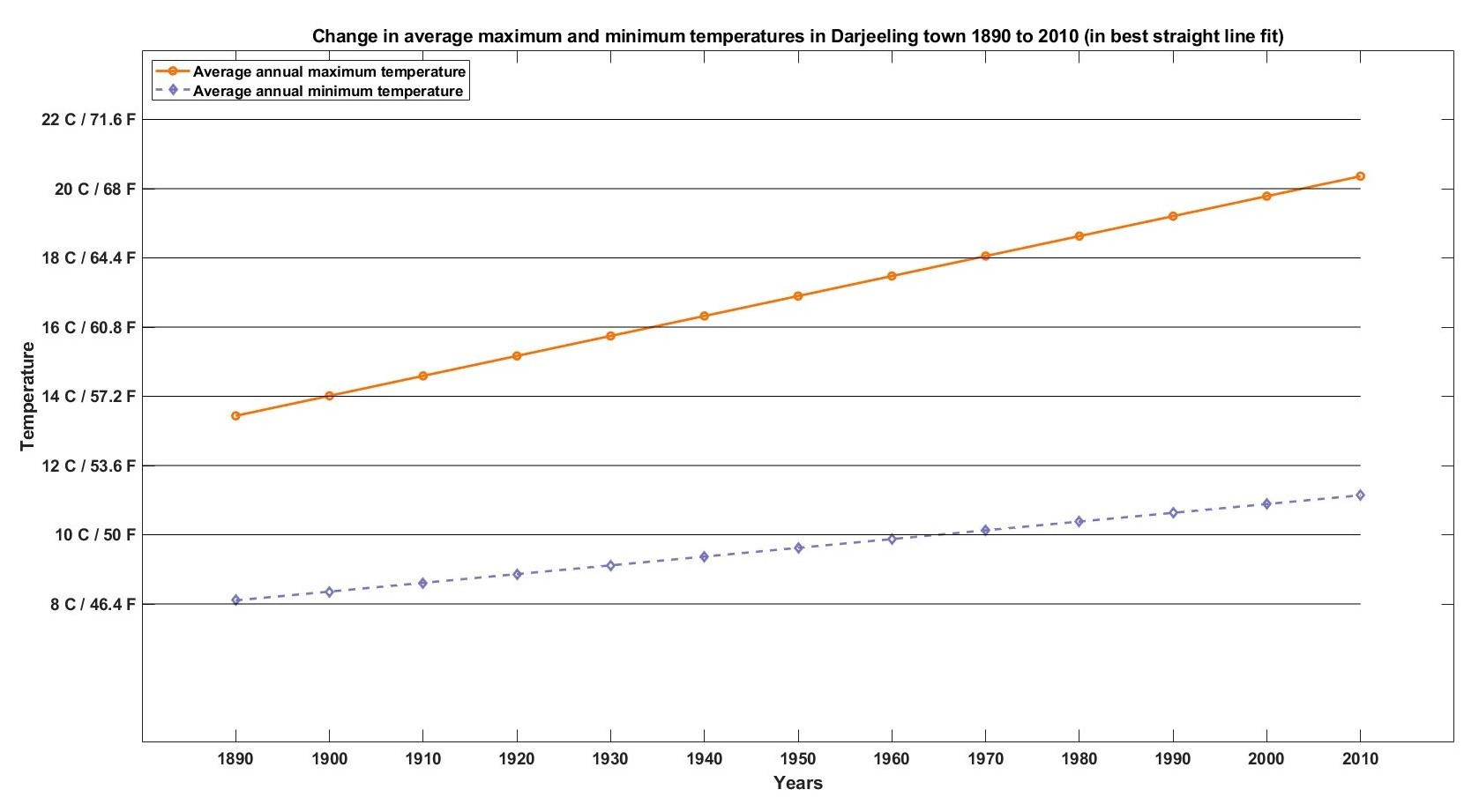
Annual average, daily max. and min. temperature, Darjeeling, 1890 to 2010

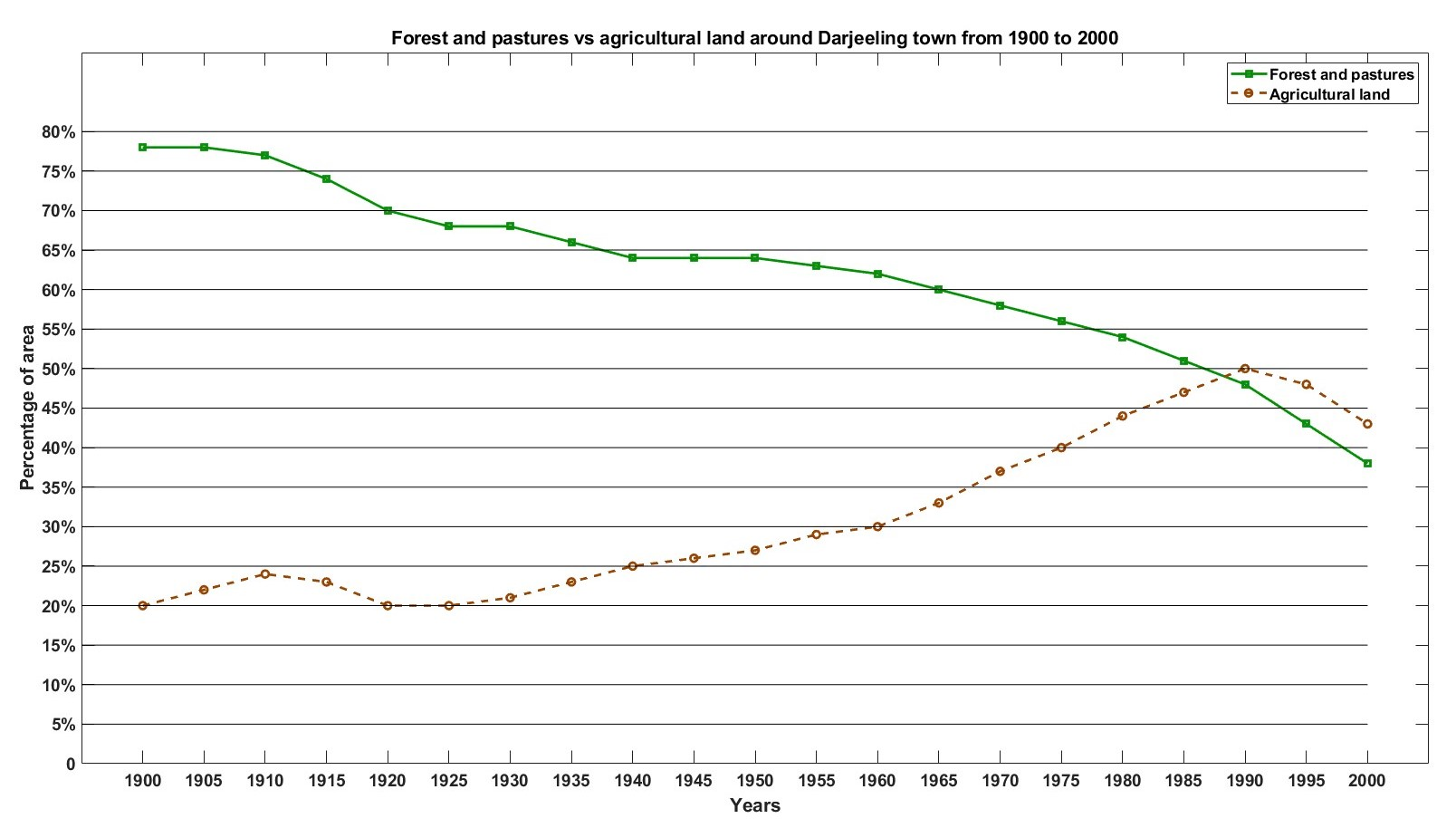
Forests and pastures vs. agricultural land in and around Darjeeling, 1900 to 2000

From the beginning of the twentieth century, Darjeeling's average temperature has increased by 4 °C, which is twice the world's average, and the annual averages of its daily maximum and minimum temperatures have increased by greater margins. During the same period, relative humidity has decreased by 7%, and rainfall by 300 millimetres (0.98 ft) annually. For its water the Darjeeling municipality and the surrounding hills depend to a large extent on perennial or seasonal jhora springs (see Map 1), especially during the pre-monsoon months from February to May. The Senchal Lakes, two artificial reservoirs built in 1910 and 1932 in a forested high-altitude area to the southeast (see Map 2), which are filled with water from a surrounding catchment area during the monsoon months, have a greatly reduced supply, as of 2016. Darjeeling's explosive population growth in the period 1961–2011, and extensive deforestation even within the protected catchment area for the lakes, have caused many springs to have vastly reduced yields during the dry months from February to May. Of the 26 springs that had once fed the lakes, 12 have been affected. Forests and pastures have shrunk from 78% in 1900 to 38% in 2000, and cultivated land, which contributes to soil erosion, has correspondingly increased during the same time from 20% to 44%. By 2006, land records in Darjeeling showed that foodgrain-producing farmland had decreased proportionally, caused by accelerated levels of urbanisation and by subsistence farming giving way to commercial cropping, especially of tea. In 2016, acid rain, which can be caused by air pollution and can in turn damage forests, was observed in the Eastern Himalayas; the pH value in Darjeeling was measured at 4.2. A 2022 article quoting another 2016 study reported a pH value of 5.0±0.825 in the rainwater.

According to a 2014 study, the influx of the excess population in the tea plantations around Darjeeling into "marginal areas of city—on backfill, slopes, septic tanks, and jhorās (springs)—has strapped the city's colonial-era infrastructure. Despite building codes that prohibit buildings taller than three storeys, the market for cheap housing in Darjeeling inspires developers to go skyward, often as many as eight storeys. Hastily built apartment houses ... are falling into the jhorās and sliding down the mountainside."

== Flora and fauna ==
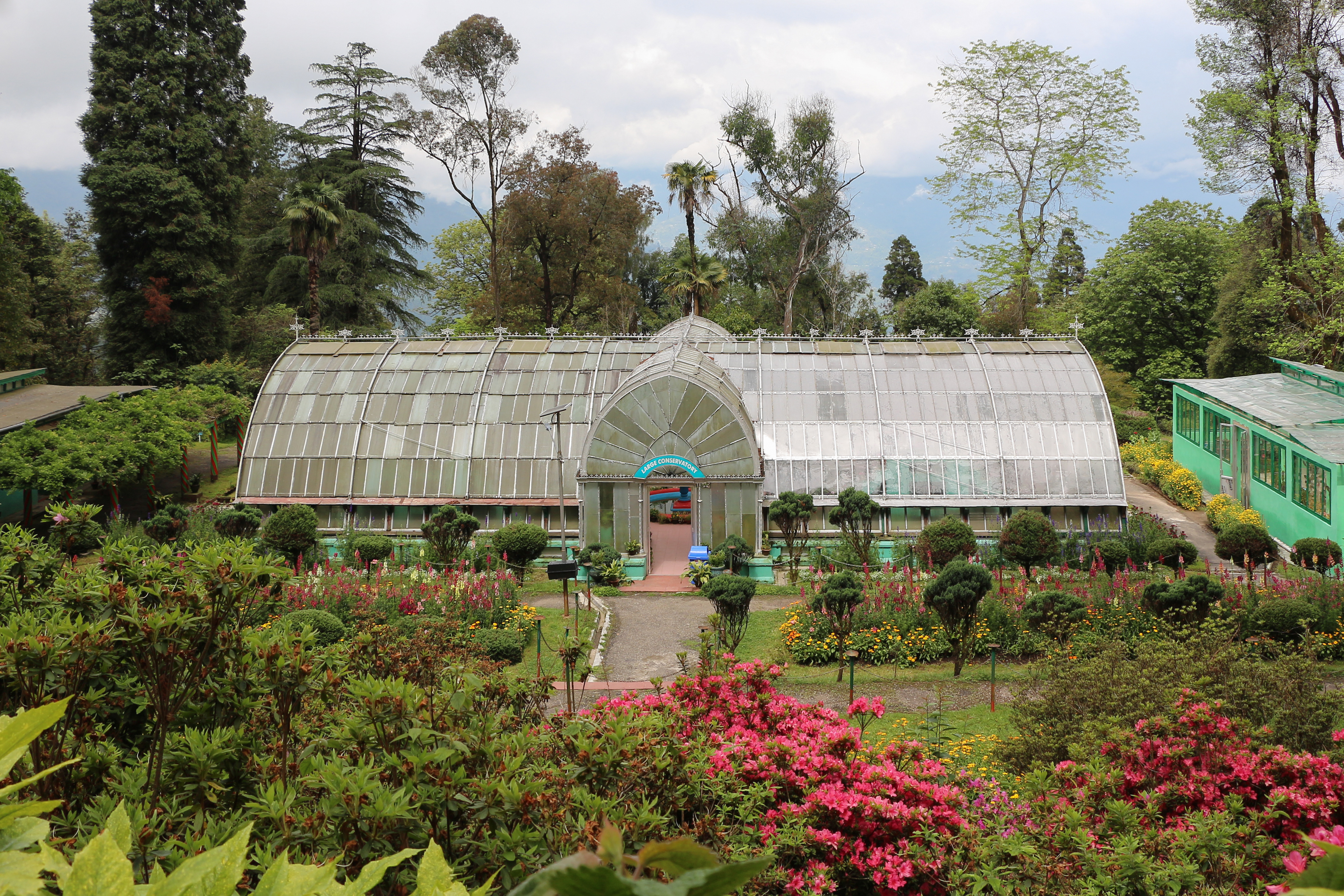
The 16-hectare (40-acre) Lloyd Botanic Garden, founded in 1878

A red panda (Ailurus fulgens) in the Padmaja Naidu Himalayan Zoo

Darjeeling is a part of the Eastern Himalayan zoo-geographic zone. Flora around Darjeeling comprises sal, oak, semi-evergreen, temperate and alpine forests. Dense evergreen forests of sal and oak lie around the city, where a wide variety of rare orchids are found. The Lloyd's Botanical Garden preserves common and rare species of plants, while the Padmaja Naidu Himalayan Zoological Park specialises in conserving and breeding endangered Himalayan species. Darjeeling and the surrounding region face deforestation due to increasing demand for wood fuel and timber, as well as air pollution from increasing vehicular traffic.

Forests and wildlife in the district are managed and protected by the Divisional Forest Officer of the Territorial and Wildlife wing of the West Bengal Forest Department. The fauna found in Darjeeling includes several species of ducks, teals, plovers and gulls that pass Darjeeling while migrating to and from Tibet. Small mammals found in the region include civets (such as small and large Indian civets, masked palm civet, spotted linsang and binturong), mongooses (such as Indian grey mongoose and crab-eating mongoose) and badgers (such as Burmese ferret-badger and greater hog badger). Other carnivores found in the area include Himalayan black bear and red panda. A conservation centre for red pandas opened at Darjeeling Zoo in 2014, building on a prior captive breeding programme; this Species Survival Plan had about 25 red pandas by 2016. The Himalayan newt Tylotriton verrucosus, one of two salamander species occurring in India, is found in wetlands in the vicinity. The Himalayan relict dragonfly Epiophlebia laidlawi, one of just four species in the family Epiophlebiidae, was first described from the region.

== Demographics ==
The Indian decennial census of 2011 (the last for which there is processed data) recorded the population of the Darjeeling municipality to be 118,805 individuals. Of these, 59,618 were females and 59,187 were males, yielding a gender ratio of 1007 females for every 1000 males. The population density of the municipality was 15,990 individuals per km^{2} (41,000 per square mile). The literacy rate was 93.9%—the female literacy rate was 91.3% and the male was 96.4%. Among groups whose historical disadvantages have been recognized by the Constitution of India and designated for amelioration in subsequent commissions and programmes, the scheduled tribes of Darjeeling town constituted approximately 22.4% of the population, and the scheduled castes 7.7%. The work participation rate was 34.4%. The number of people living in slums was 25,026 individuals (which was 21.1% of the population).

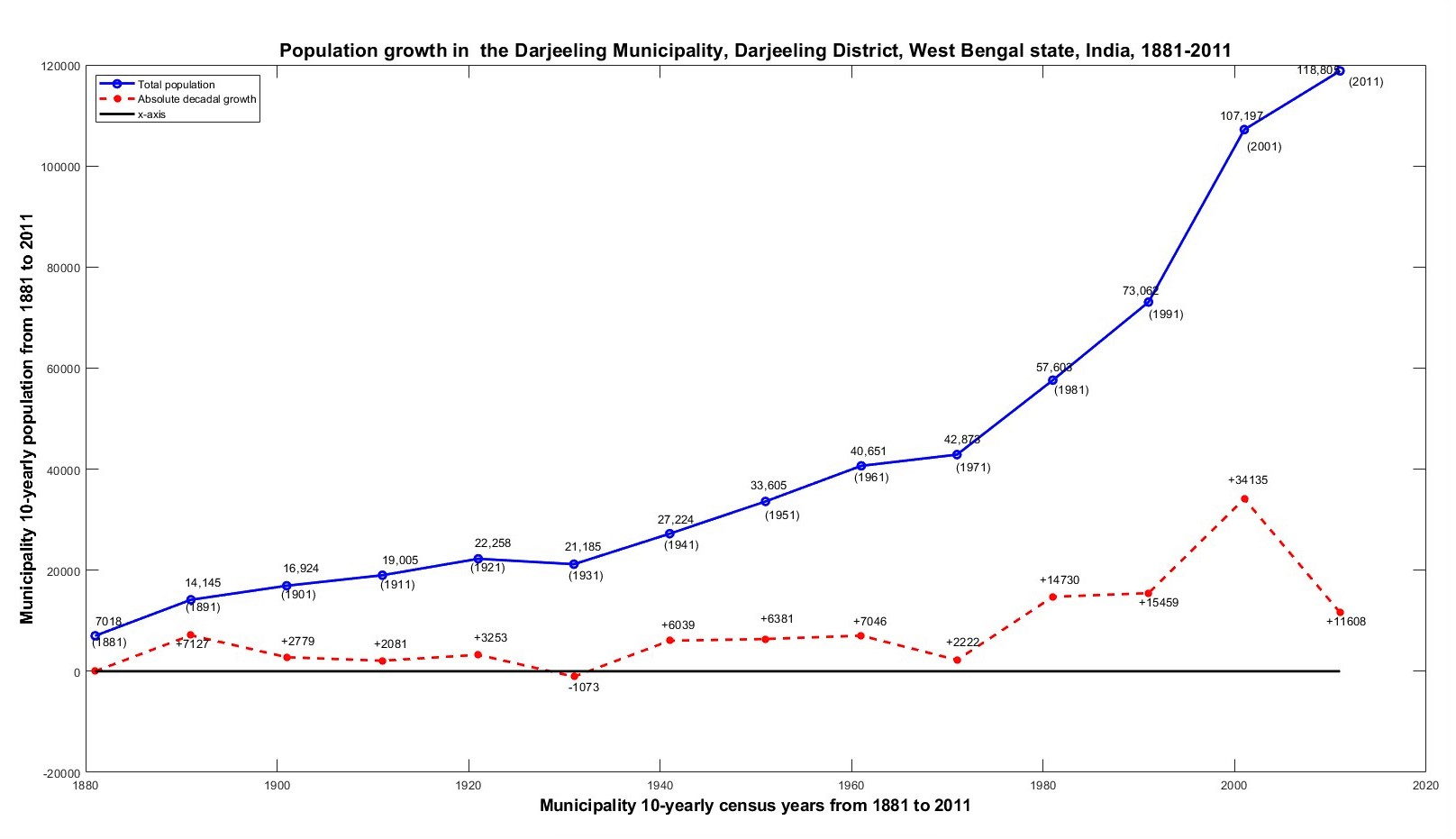
Figure 1: Darjeeling 10-yearly census data from 1881 to 2011 (Note: Based on the data in Mondal and Roychowdhury, 2018.)

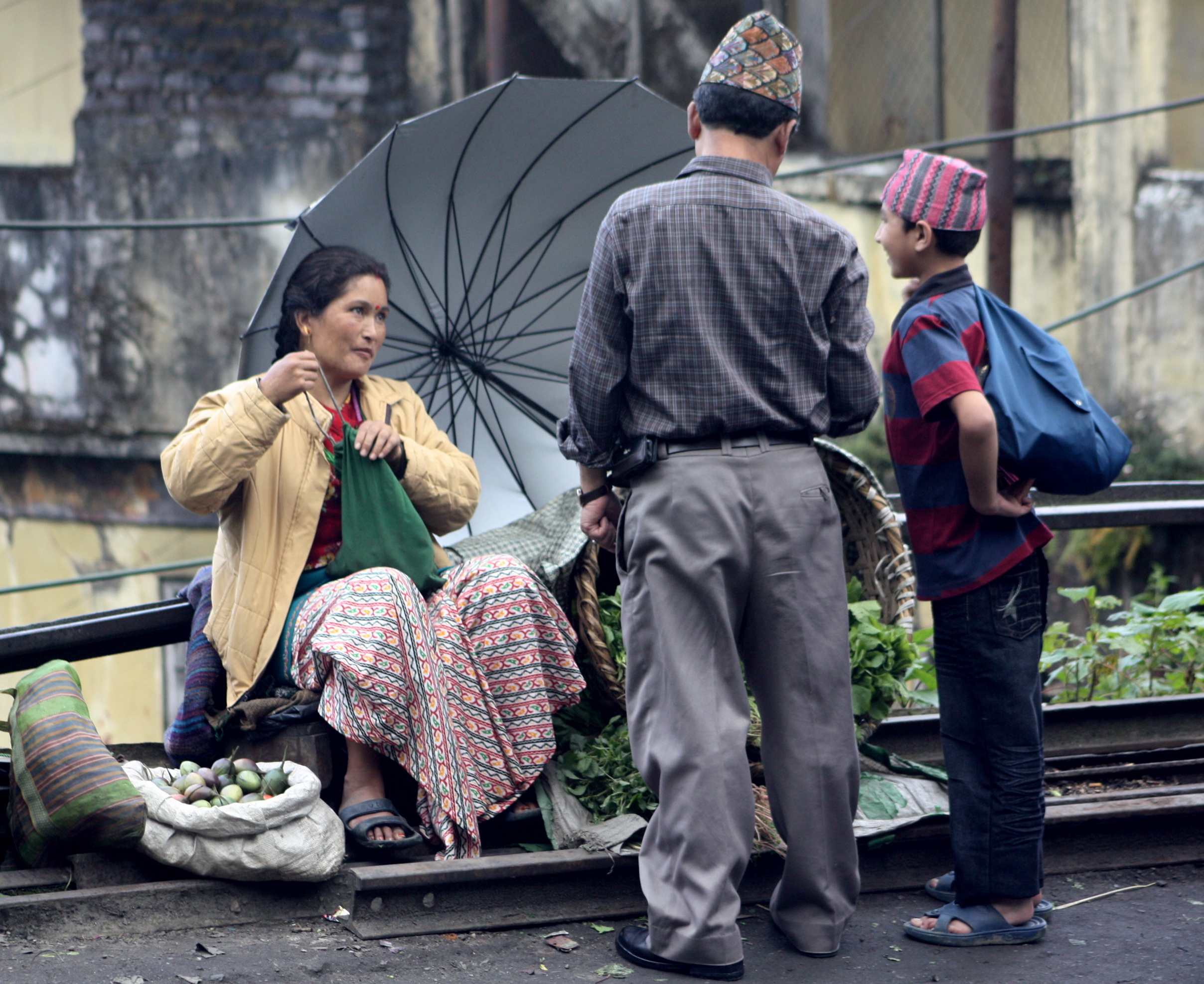
Males with Dhaka topi shopping, Darjeeling, 2008

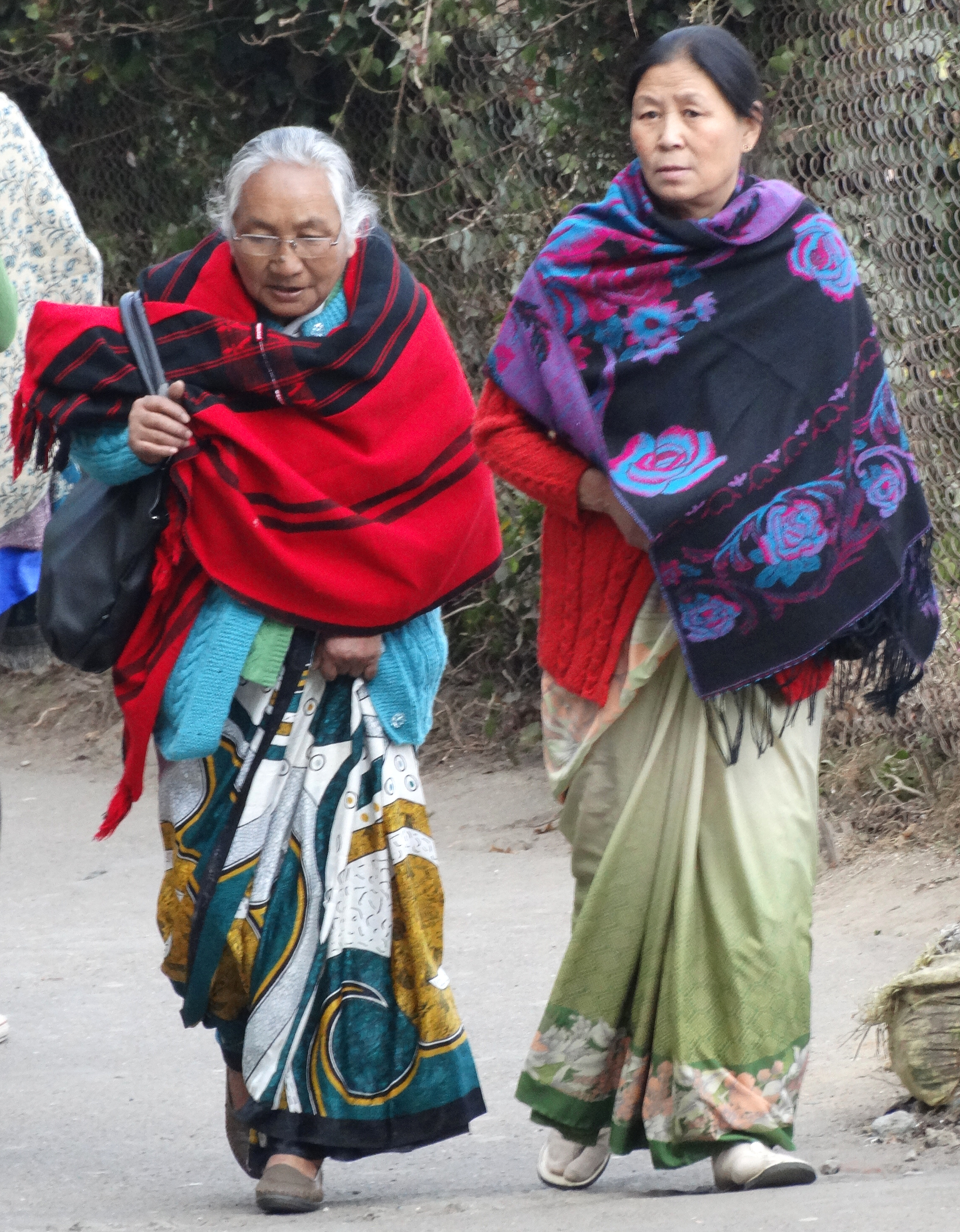
Women in traditional dress, 2014

Darjeeling began to be an "administrative" town in independent India after being made the headquarters of Darjeeling district in 1947. During the period 1961–2011, the town's population increased at an accelerated rate (Figure 1). An "aspirational middle class" arose, comprising families of professionals in the administration, and retail and service industries.

"Indian Gorkha" is a term that denotes the Nepali-speaking people of India, as distinct from the Nepali-speaking inhabitants of Nepal. As of 2016, the population of Darjeeling was predominantly Indian Gorkha. There were also smaller numbers of Lepchas, Bhutias, Tibetans, Bengalis, Marwaris and Biharis. In the 2011 census, between them they practised Hinduism (66.5%), Buddhism (23.9%), Christianity (5.1%) and Islam (3.9%). The Lepchas were considered the main indigenous community of the region; their original religion was a form of animism. The Nepali community was a complex mix of numerous castes and ethnic groups, with many roots in tribal and animist traditions. The accelerated growth of the town's population and the tightly packed living conditions in which different ethnicities mixed created syncretic cultures in Darjeeling which evolved away from their historical roots.

According to a 2014 study, although the demand for labour in the tea estates surrounding Darjeeling had stayed roughly constant since 1910, the population of Nepali-speaking workers and their families in the tea estates had grown throughout. As the excess population migrated up to Darjeeling in search of jobs and housing, their cause was championed by the Gorkhaland movement in the 1980s; this had the effect of making a considerable number of non-Gorkha families leave their homes in Darjeeling.

Seasonal migration out of Darjeeling has long been a local feature, especially among the lower-income groups; substantial migration among middle-class youth is a 21st-century occurrence. Many educated young people in Darjeeling have begun to migrate out because the growth of jobs in the area has not kept pace with the numbers of people with tertiary degrees. For both groups of migrants, favoured destinations fall into three groups:

- neighbouring Gangtok in Sikkim, and Siliguri in North Bengal at the base of the Darjeeling hills;
- the large bustling cities of Mumbai; Delhi, Bengaluru, and Kolkata;
- Kathmandu, the capital of Nepal. Those looking for immediate employment commonly work in call centres, beauty parlours, and dumpling stands.

Those looking for eventual employment in professional careers pursue higher education. Both groups have experienced racism and economic and social discrimination in India's big cities, caused by their distinctive, more East Asian, physical appearance.

== Governance ==
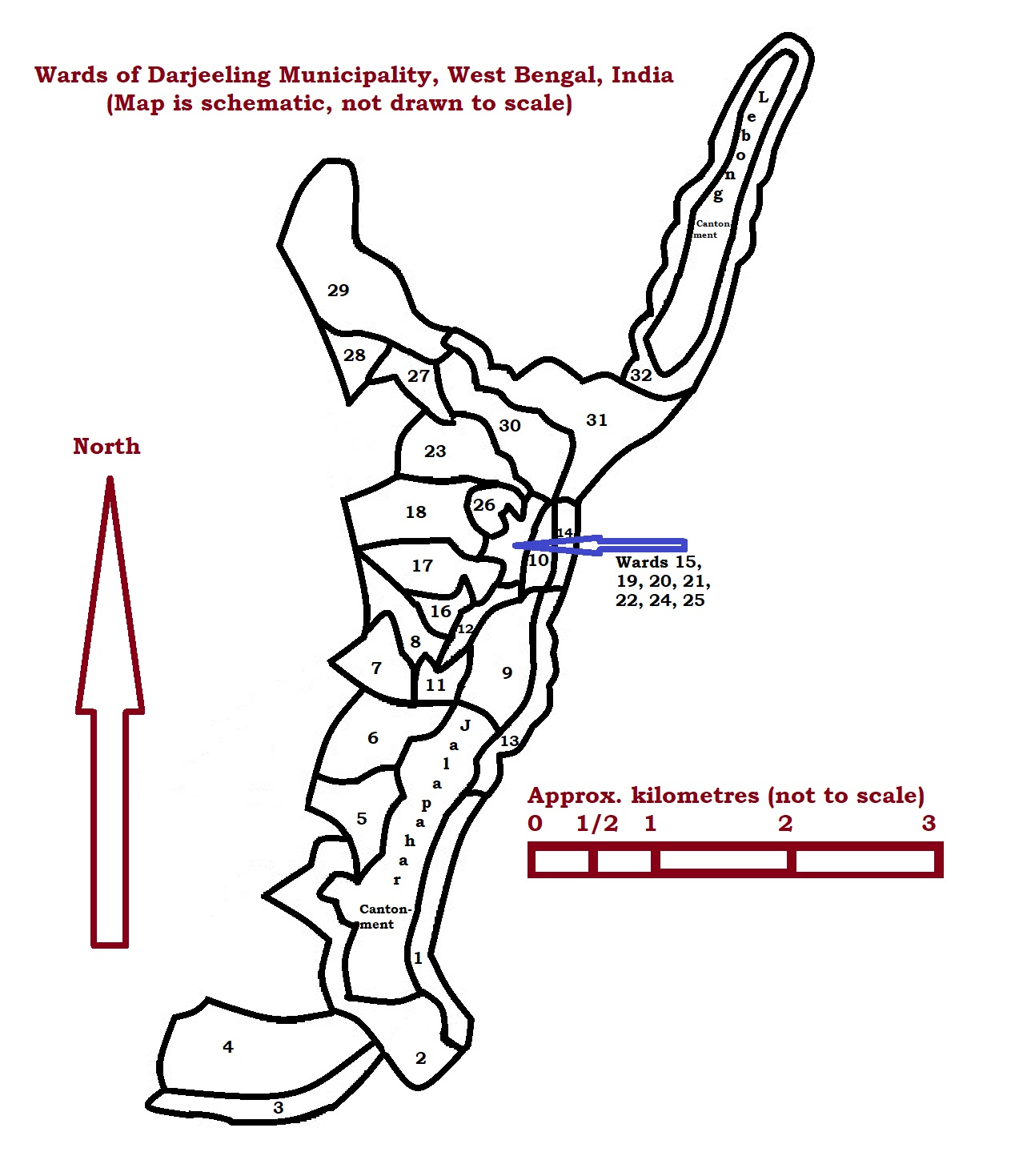
A schematic map of Darjeeling Municipality wards

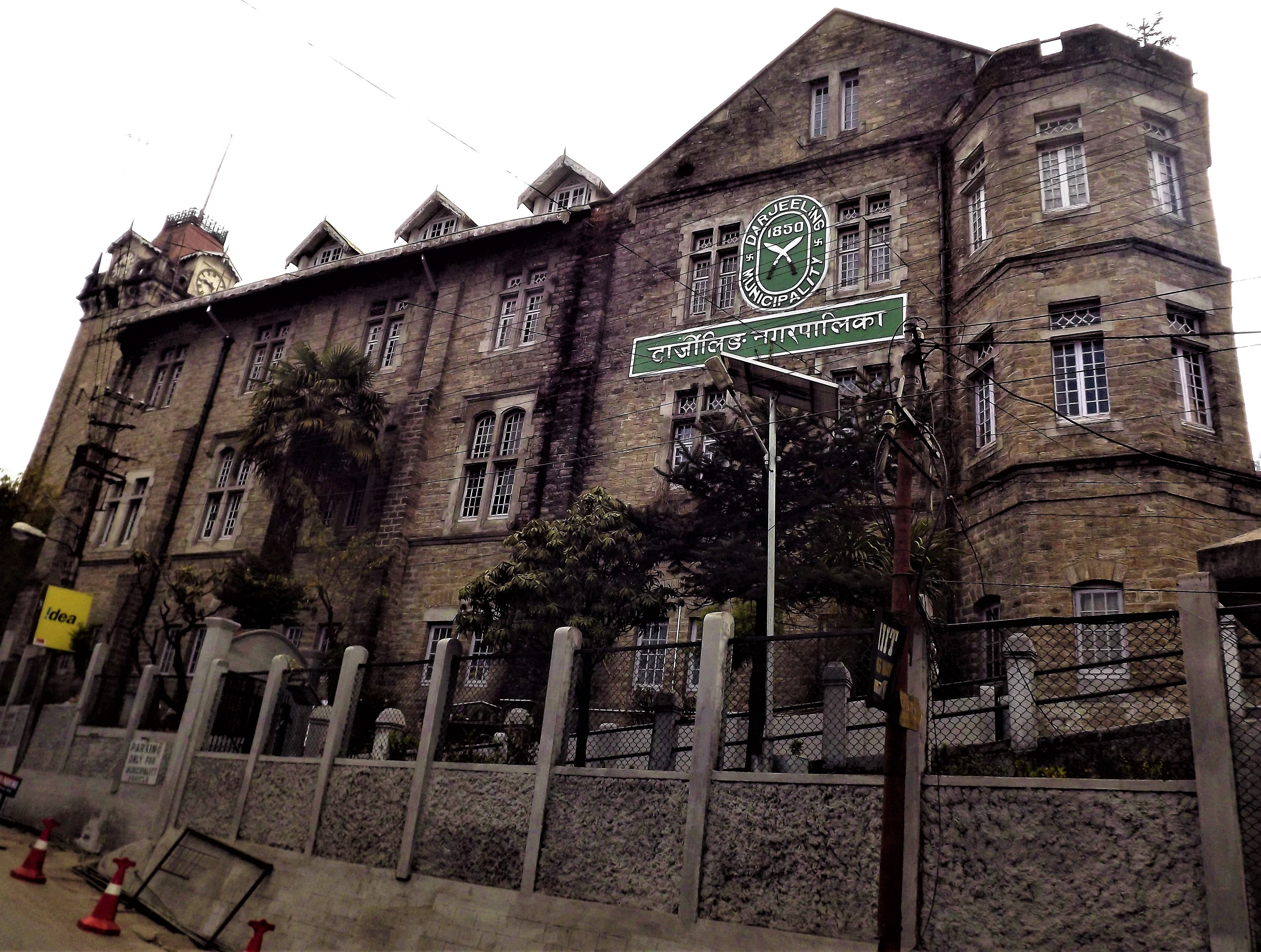
Darjeeling Municipality building

The Darjeeling Municipality is one of the oldest in India, established on 1 July 1850, with ten wards. It was governed by commissioners who were nominated until 1916, then elected until 1932, and nominated again until 1947. After India's independence that year, the commissioners continued to be appointed until 1964, when the first election was held. It was overturned by a court injunction; further elections and continual interference by West Bengal's state government became the prevalent state of affairs. As of 2021, the municipality is governed by a board of councillors headed by a chairperson and a vice chairperson. The number of wards in the municipality increased to 32 in 1988. Wards represent electoral subdivisions; in 2017, 32 councillors were elected, one from each ward. The wards were reorganized and bifurcated in 2011.

The area of the city (municipality) was reduced from 10.75 square kilometres (4.15 mi^{2}) to 7.43 square kilometres (2.87 mi^{2}) in 2011 after bifurcation. By 2016, the municipality was surrounded by tea gardens and forestry department land and had minimal room for expansion.

In 2021, the city had approximately 22,000 households and 350 hotels and restaurants. That same year the following statistics were collected: the municipality considered wards 15, 19, 20, 21, 22, 24, and 25 to be the core areas; most businesses, hotels, restaurants, and educational institutions were located in these wards and they were better connected to municipal electricity and water; wards 10, 15, 20 and areas of ward 30 were the most developed, whereas wards 1, 2, 13, 14, 27, 31, and 32 were the most deprived; and the latter group of wards contained 37 slums in which 23% of the population of Darjeeling resided.

In 1988, the Gorkha-dominated hill areas of Darjeeling district were given an autonomous form of governance under the Darjeeling Gorkha Hill Council (DGHC). In 2012, the DGHC was replaced by a similar body called the Gorkhaland Territorial Administration (GTA). The elected members of GTA manage certain affairs of the hills, including education, industry and land revenue; they cannot legislate or levy taxes. The Gorkha Janmukti Morcha (GJM) held power in the municipality until March 2022, when it was defeated by the newly-formed Hamro Party.

Darjeeling is within the Darjeeling Assembly constituency that elects one member of West Bengal Legislative Assembly in state legislative elections every five years. The town is part of the Darjeeling parliamentary constituency that elects one member for the Lok Sabha, the lower house of India's bicameral Parliament.

== Economy ==
A 2017 study described the Darjeeling area as entirely dependent on the production of tea and the inflow of tourists to create employment.

=== Tea ===
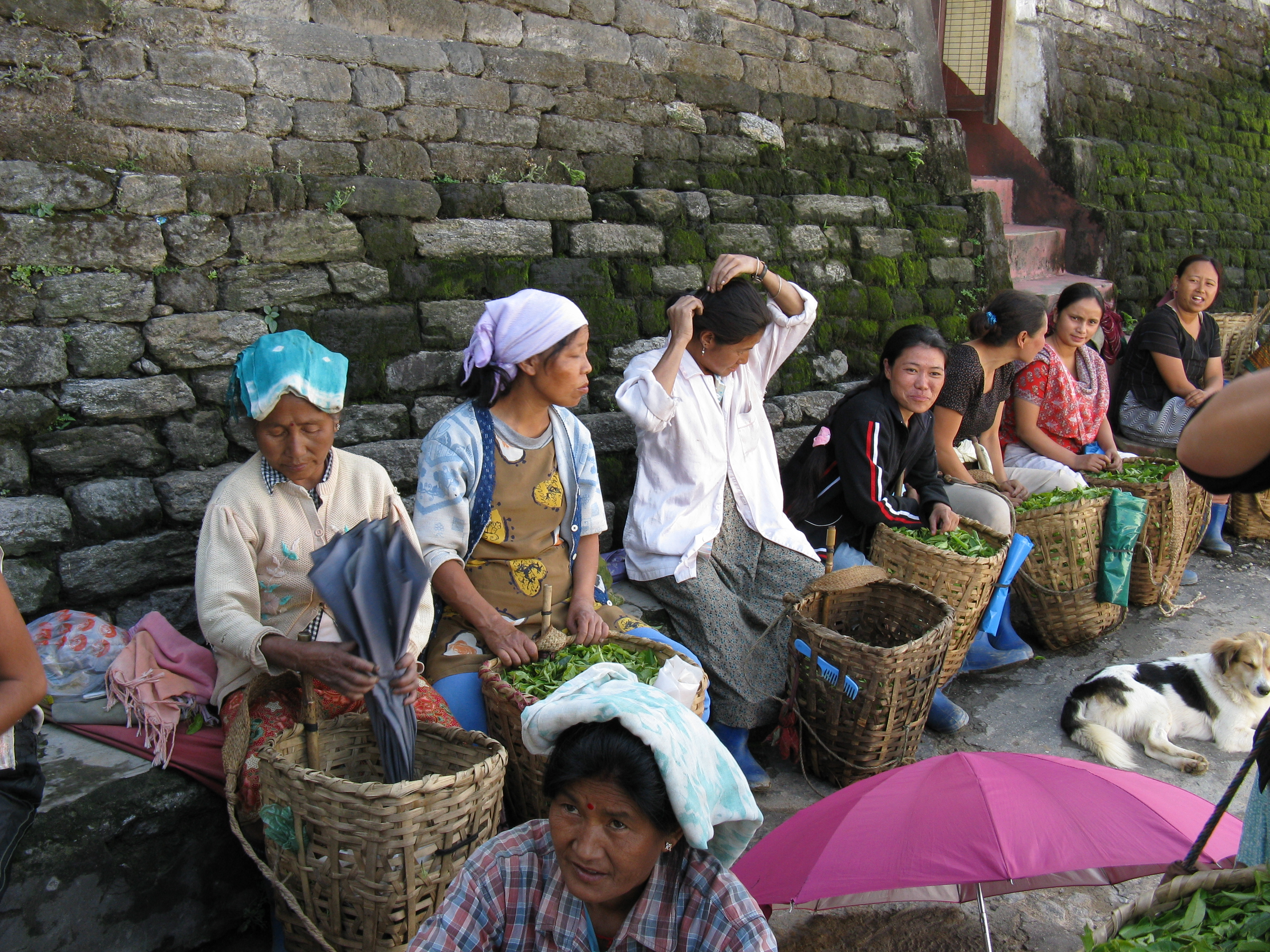
Tea garden workers, some waiting to turn in their pickings; others have done so

Darjeeling tea is produced on plantations in which a few leaves (Note: the fabled, "two leaves and a bud") on each tea bush are plucked by women. During the tea bush's dormancy period in the short winter season, it is pruned by the women to stimulate growth the following season. Unlike China, where the tea bush grew into a tree, the early British planters devised these means to monocrop tea in tightly packed hedges on vast estates. In the plantation factories, men operate machines to ferment, dry, and package the normally short-lived green tea leaves.

After India's independence in 1947, many of Darjeeling's governmental and economic arrangements remained unchanged. When British planters auctioned off their estates, they were bought by Indians from the plains or corporations from elsewhere in India. Darjeeling's labour force had long consisted of workers recruited from Nepal. Mid-19th-century British ethnologists had commended Nepalese for their step farming and other forms of settled agriculture in the Himalayan foothills. They were contrasted with Darjeeling's native population of the Lepcha at the time of British annexation, who practised "shifting agriculture". Planters believed that if allotted a house and a yard in which to grow vegetables and fruit, the Nepalis would be more inclined to stay. The arrangement, which lasted during the colonial period, was formalized in independent India's Plantations Labour Act, 1951. As of 2017, workers maintain their two or three-bedroom homes which they do not own, become attached to their upkeep, and eventually hope to retire in them when an adult child who also works on the plantation inherits the house.

In 2017, the average basic daily wage (that is, without employee benefits) of a Darjeeling tea garden worker was Rupees 144.60 (US$2.22) per day. With benefits, it was Rupees 277.10 (US$4.26) per day. (Note: The employee benefits for Darjeeling included Rs 14.20 (US$0.22) per day for foodgrains; Rupees 5.20 (US$0.08 in 2017) per day for dry tea, and Rupees 5.55 (US$0.09) for fuel (for cooking or heating).) Comparatively, Darjeeling's tea estate workers were paid less in 2017 than tea estate workers in several southern Indian states. (Note: The same study recorded the basic 2017 daily wages (without employee benefits) for tea estate workers in the southern states of Kerala, Karnataka and Tamil Nadu to be Rs 310 (US$4.76) per day, Rs 263 (US$4.04) per day, and Rupees 241 (US$3.7) per day respectively.) The auction price of Darjeeling tea for 2017 was comparatively higher. (Note: Rs 128.54 (US$1.97) per 1 kilogram (2.2 lb); whereas it was Rs 115.48 (US$1.77), Rs 99.07 (US$1.52), and Rs. 93.07 (US$1.43) for Kerala, Karnataka and Tamil Nadu respectively.)

A 2017 study found that some 60% of the plantation labour jobs in the Darjeeling area were held by women. The protection and economic development of the tea labour force was one of the motivations for India's enactment of the Geographical Indications of Goods (Registration and Protection) Act, 1999. According to a 2017 study, "India has pursued the recognition of iconic brands, not only to create market share but also to recognise the value of the GI system to encourage development in poor, rural regions with high unemployment rates. This is consistent with the broad WTO objective to encourage trade liberalisation in developing countries to reduce poverty." Darjeeling tea was given GI recognition in Europe in spite of some European Union member nations objecting to the use of the indication for blended tea. It was recognized in US Geographical Indication mark, "DARJEELING, Registration No. 1,632,726."

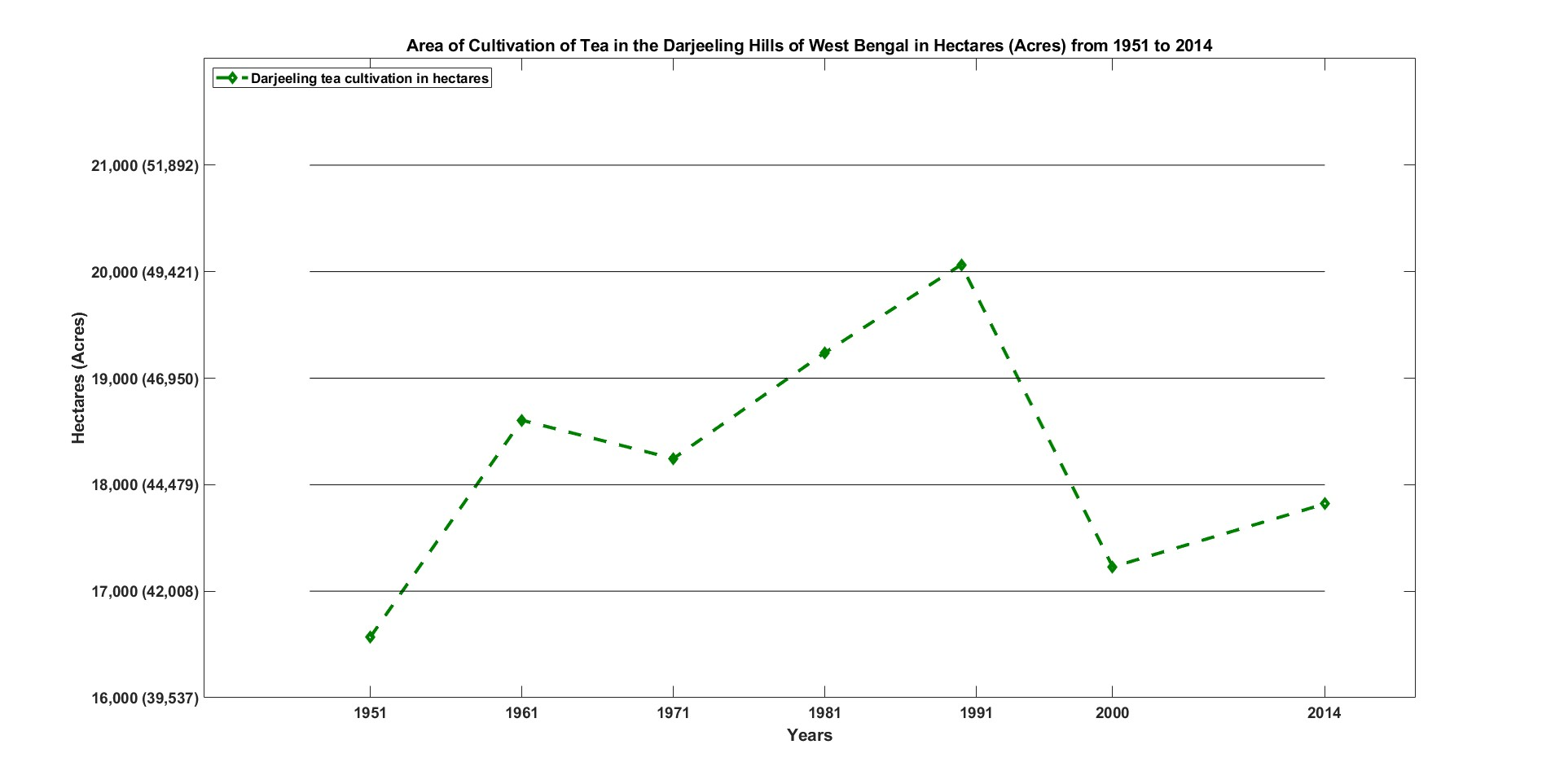
Area of cultivation of Darjeeling tea in hectares (acres) from 1951 to 2014

Tea is produced in the Darjeeling hills and farther below in two different forms. Orthodox tea looks like the twisted and dried version of the green leaves on the bushes. (Note: Citing 2017 data, a 2021 study recorded the number of tea estates in the Darjeeling hills to be 81, but their yields per 1 hectare (2.5 acres) were generally less than 1,500 kilograms (3,300 lb).) The Darjeeling sub-division of the Darjeeling hills had 46 tea estates in 2017, producing mostly orthodox tea. This is commonly exported and is some of the world's most expensive. In the crush, tear, curl, or CTC version, which is commonly grown in the Kurseong sub-division (with 29 tea estates), and the Kalimpong (with 6), the tea leaves are mechanically manipulated, fired, and turned into tiny hard pellets that look like instant coffee. Cheaply available, and boiled with milk and sugar, when CTC tea was introduced into the Indian market in the early 1950s, it turned India into a nation of tea drinkers.

The area of cultivation of Darjeeling tea increased from 16,569 hectares (in 1951) to a high of 20,065 (in 1990) and dropped to 17,820 (in 2014) according to a 2021 study. There were 99 tea estates in 1961; these increased until 1990 (when 102 were recorded) but dropped to 83 by 1995 and to 81 by 2014. The 20% drop from 1990 to 1995 was attributed in the study to India's economic liberalisation which came into force in the very early 1990s. A 2017 study similarly reported the Indian tea industry to have been adversely affected by price drops after India's economic liberalisation in the 1990s. Darjeeling tea garden owners invested their surpluses in more profitable industries elsewhere, causing a decline in productivity in the local tea industry. The Tea Board of India estimated 7,010,000 kilograms (15,450,000 lb) of Darjeeling tea was produced in 2021; this constitutes about 0.5% of total 1,343,060,000 kilograms (2.96094×10^{9} lb) produced in India.

=== Tourism ===
Darjeeling has two peak tourism seasons, September to November and April to May. A 2014 study suggested that domestic tourism is the foundation of the city's vacation business. The Chowrasta is a popular shopping and gathering area where a tourist might get their picture taken dressed in colourful and rustic local clothes. The tea plantations below are particularly visited by foreign tourists. Old bungalows in some plantations have been converted to deluxe lodgings in which rooms rent out dearly by any global standard. Some tourists hold dear the escape to a peaceful, unspoilt, and picturesque landscape evoked in Satyajit Ray's 1962-film Kanchenjungha.

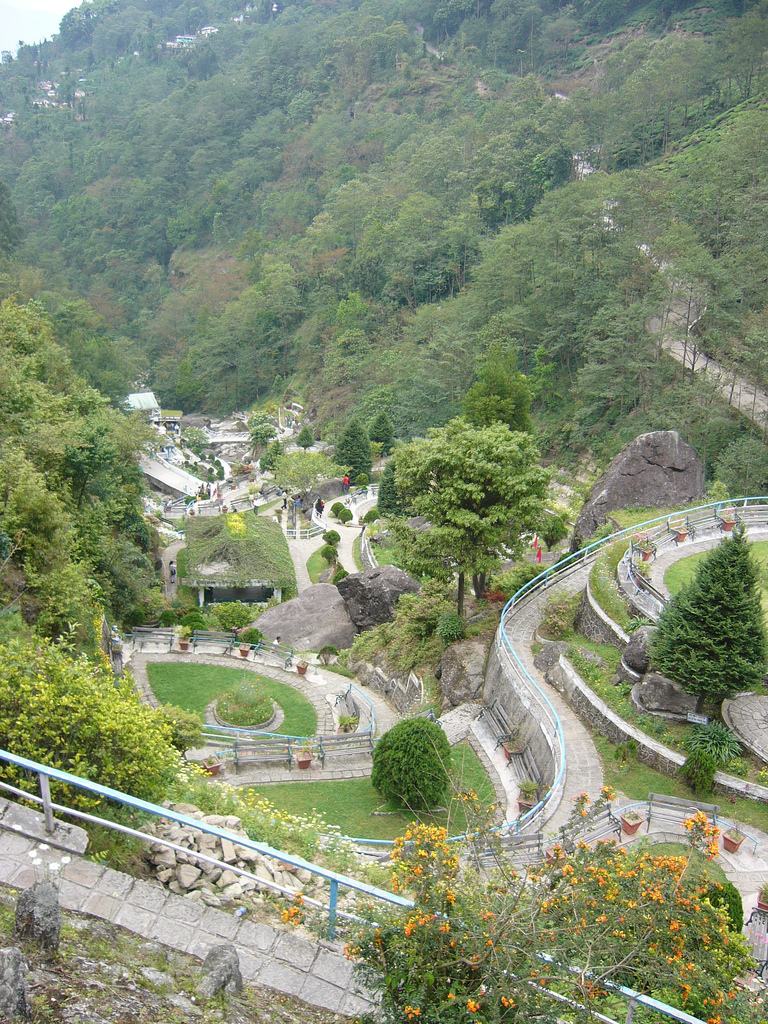
A terraced rock garden in Darjeeling

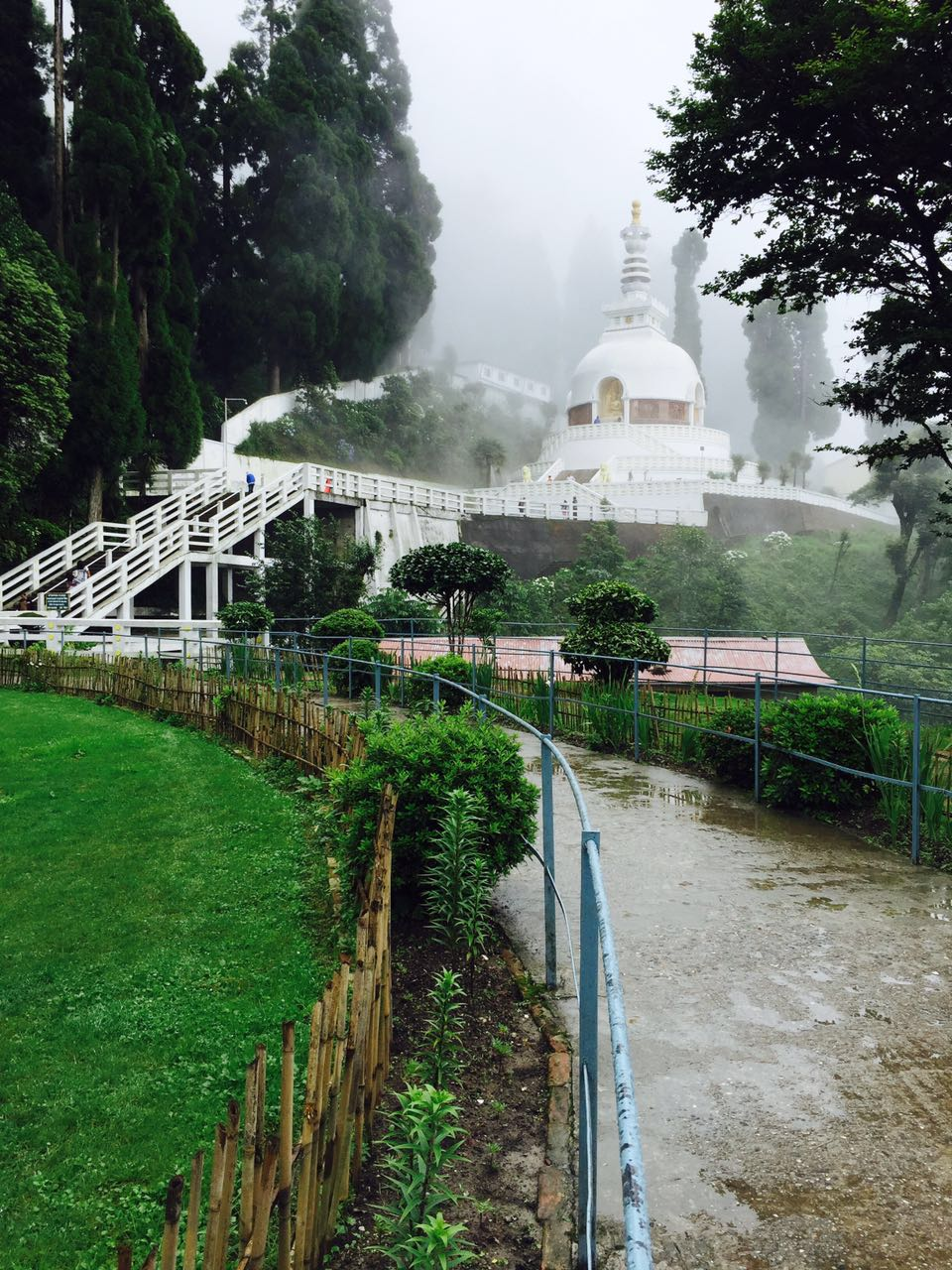
The Japanese Peace Pagoda, Darjeeling during rain

Darjeeling had become an important tourist destination as early as 1860. Since India's economic liberalisation in 1991, tourism in Darjeeling has become cheaper, and Darjeeling, once considered a luxury destination, has become accessible to mass tourism. A 2016 study recorded the tourist influx into Darjeeling between 2009 and 2014 as ranging from a low of 243,255 individuals in the 2010–2011 season to a high of 488,675 in 2012–2013; the large majority were domestic tourists, with foreign tourists never comprising more than 35,000 annual visitors.

Darjeeling can be reached by the narrow-gauge Darjeeling Himalayan Railway (DHR) which travels a route 88 km (55 mi) long from Siliguri. Pulled by steam locomotives, it moves at speeds of between 20 kilometres (12 mi) and 25 kilometres (16 mi) per hour. Although the service was begun in the 19th century to move humans and freight efficiently, its primary clients today are tourists who are availing themselves of the opportunity to experience the mobilities of travel of a bygone era. After an international and national campaign for its support, the railway was declared a World Heritage site by UNESCO in December 1999 at the 23rd Session of the UNESCO World Heritage Committee held in Morocco. In Notes on Defining the Darjeeling Himalayan Railway: World Heritage Property, Unpublished manuscript. The DHR Archive, Kurseong, 2005, K. Weise had written:

The railway begins on the plains of West Bengal and soon begins climbing through a remnant of lowland jungle, including stands of teak. As the railway climbs, so the flora changes and its upper sections are dominated by enormous Himalayan pines, which in misty weather give a surreal quality to the landscape. It frequently hugs the ages of hillsides with drops, often of thousands of feet, to the plains and valleys below. Towering over the entire scene is the perennially snow-covered bulk of Kanchenjungha. ... From Kurseong the railway offers frequent views of this stupendous mountain, which by Ghoom dominates the entire landscape.

In a 1999 study, it was thought the tourist influx into Darjeeling had been adversely affected by the political instability in the region, including agitations in the 1980s. According to a 2018 study, tourism in Darjeeling is limited to a small area of the town so its effect on local employment is inadequate for alleviating Darjeeling's high unemployment rate. According to the author, "The majority of the employees and almost all of the top ranking officers in West Bengal Tourism Development Corporation are Bengalis; locals generally get employed as photographers, drivers, and guides."

== Utilities ==
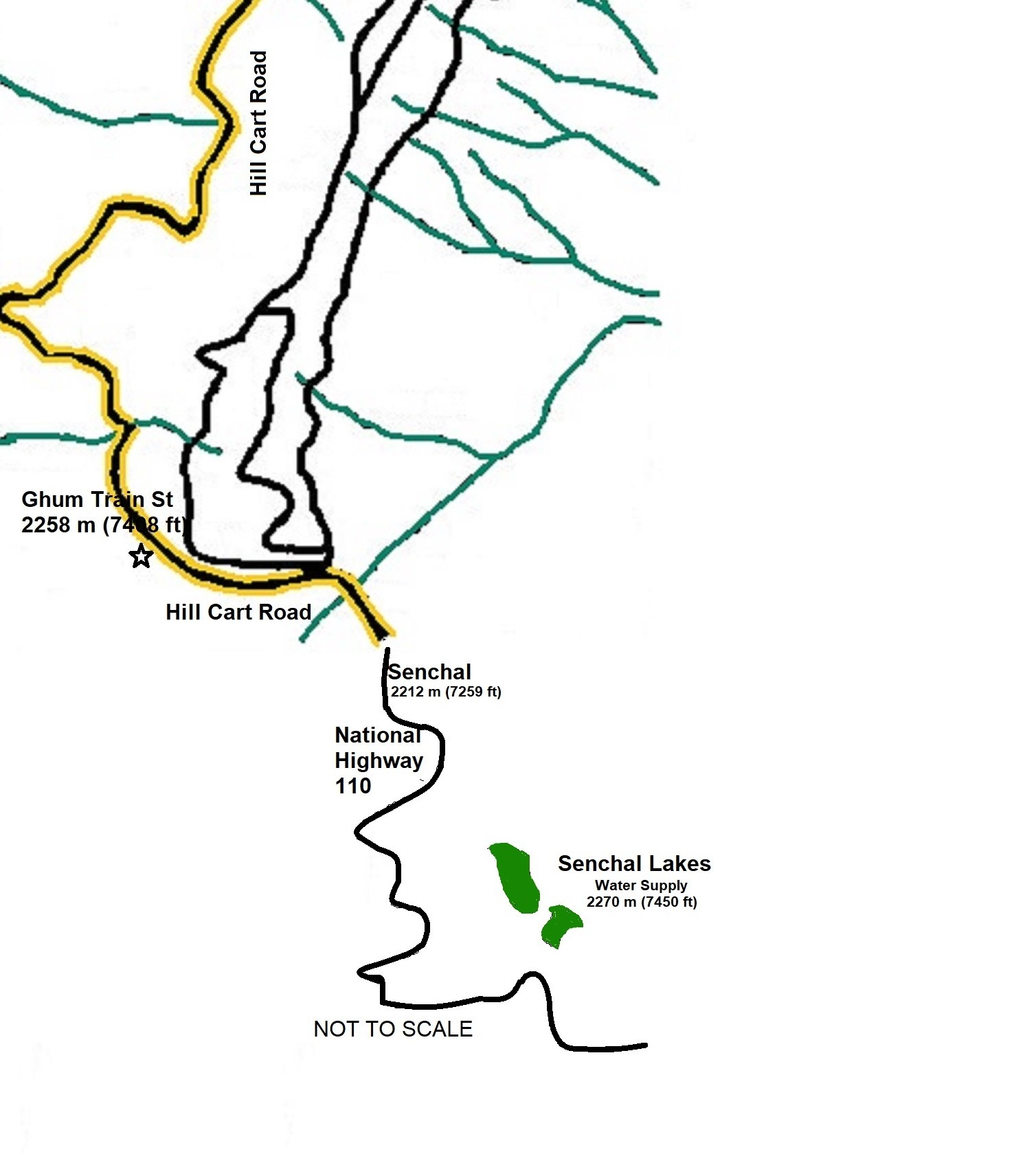
Map 2: A schematic map showing the Senchal Lakes in relation to Darjeeling

The chief catchment area for Darjeeling municipality's water is the Senchal Wildlife Sanctuary, located approximately 11 kilometres (6.8 mi) to the southeast, covering an area of 37.97 square kilometres (14.66 mi^{2}) and lying between 1,500 metres (4,900 ft) and 2,600 metres (8,500 ft) in altitude. Natural springs in the sanctuary, not all perennial, are the main source of the water supply. The steep slopes of the surrounding ridges (at inclines of between 20° and 48°) can lead to high surface run-off, subsequent absorption, and collection of water in partially confined spaces. Upon reaching a critical volume, this groundwater can surge out as seasonal springs. Water collected from 26 perennial and seasonal springs is routed through stone conduits to the Senchal Lakes (Map 2) constructed in 1910 and 1932. From Senchal the water is piped to the town after purification at a filtration plant in Jorebungalow. There are a combined 35 kilometres (22 mi) of pipes transporting water from Senchal to Darjeeling, and a further 83 kilometres (52 mi) in the water distribution system within Darjeeling. In the months before the monsoon during which water in the Senchal lakes is reduced, it is augmented by pumping water electrically from another reservoir located near Khong Khola.

A 2012 report of the Darjeeling Municipality Waterworks Department stated that from the 1930s little or no maintenance had been undertaken on the water pipeline from Senchal. Engineers in the department suggested that there might be up to 35% transmission loss, and more within Darjeeling. Once in Darjeeling, the water is distributed along the colonial pattern, first serving more expensive and sought-after uphill neighbourhoods and then the low-income downhill ones, which have more restricted access to the supply. The system was designed to serve a population of up to 20,000 individuals. Between 1911 and 2011, there had been a six-fold increase in the population of the municipality, not including the large number of transients such as students, migrant workers, and tourists (see Figure 1). Increasing demand has led to a worsening shortfall in the water supply. As a result, many residents have to purchase water from private vendors who either supply it in water tankers or in hand-pushed carts; they sometimes collect the water from the local jhora or springs. (see Map 1). Larger private businesses are involved in supplying households but do so at a substantially higher cost.

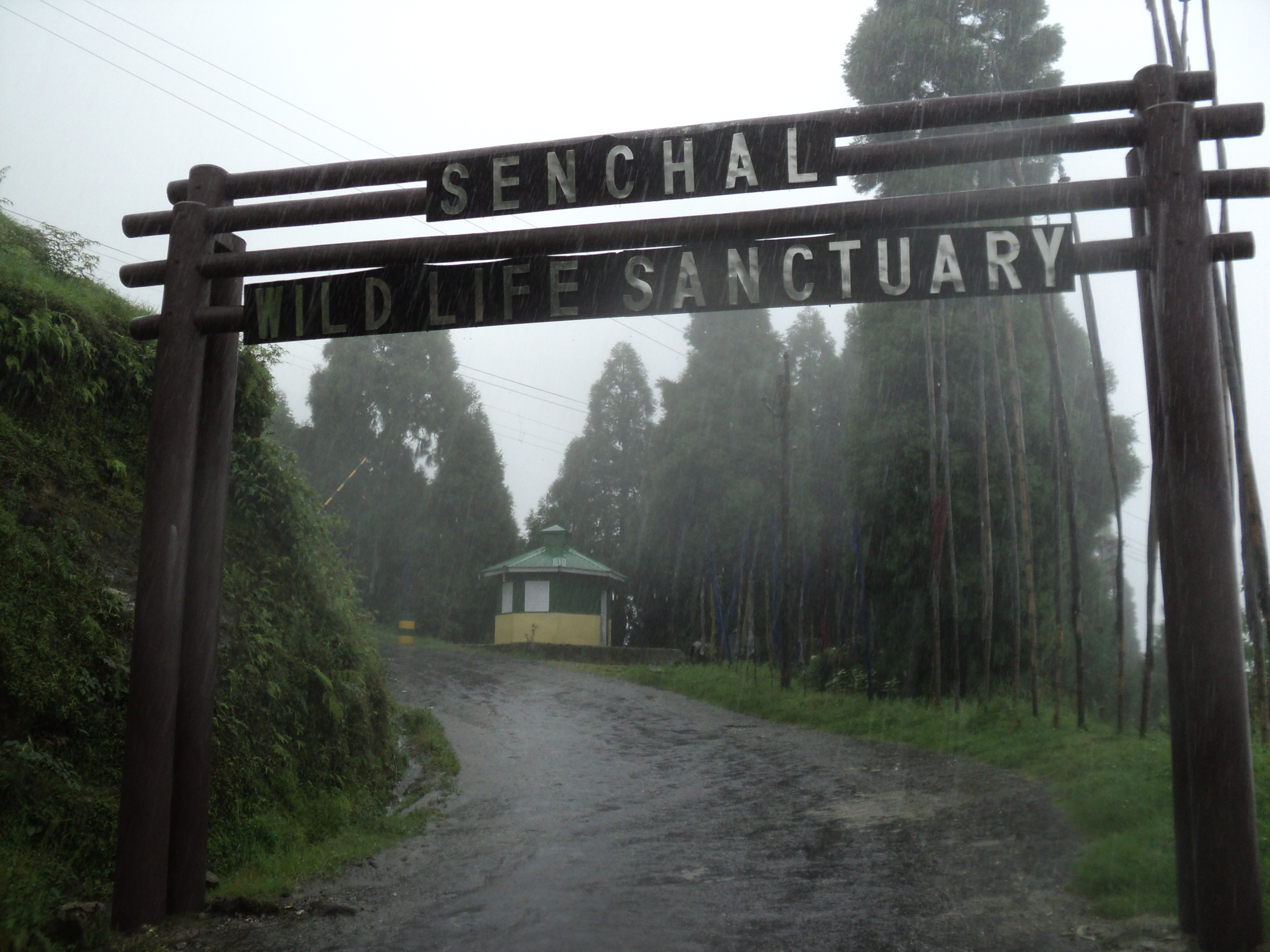
Senchal Wildlife Sanctuary, during a downpour, July 2011

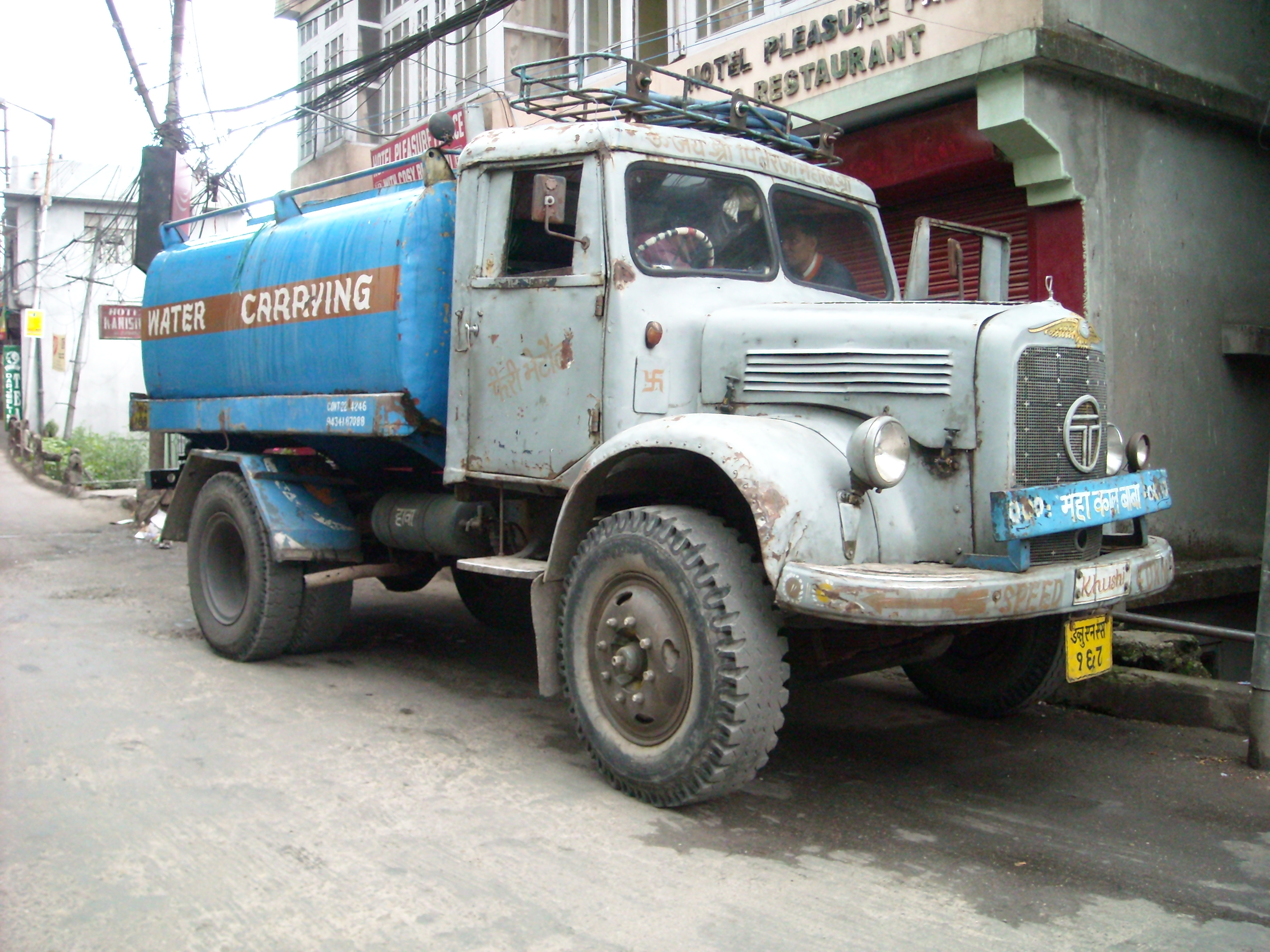
A water tanker delivering water in Darjeeling, May 2009

As of 2020, every day 30 metric tonnes of solid waste are generated in Darjeeling, and during the peak tourist seasons, the amount goes up to 50 metric tonnes. Bulk waste, which is chiefly produced in residential areas, markets and hotels, is deposited in common dumping areas from which it is taken in tractor-trailers to dumping grounds. Open dumping, which is the disposal of waste in sites not designed for waste management, is commonly practised, and has created economic and social tensions in Darjeeling.

In 1897 Darjeeling became the first town in India to be supplied by hydroelectricity, which was generated at the nearby Sidrapong Hydel Power Station; it was primarily for use in street lighting and private houses. (Note: "Crompton helped Darjeeling to earn the distinction of possessing India's first water-turbine-driven hydroelectric generating station. The power station was situated at Sidrapong (1897) and at the heart of this were two turbo-dynamos of 100 HP each situated between the hospital and the Kotwalla jhora (spring), about 3 miles from the town and 3,500 feet lower. The plant was intended primarily for street lighting and private houses.") Today, electricity is supplied by the West Bengal State Electricity Board from other locations.

== Transport ==
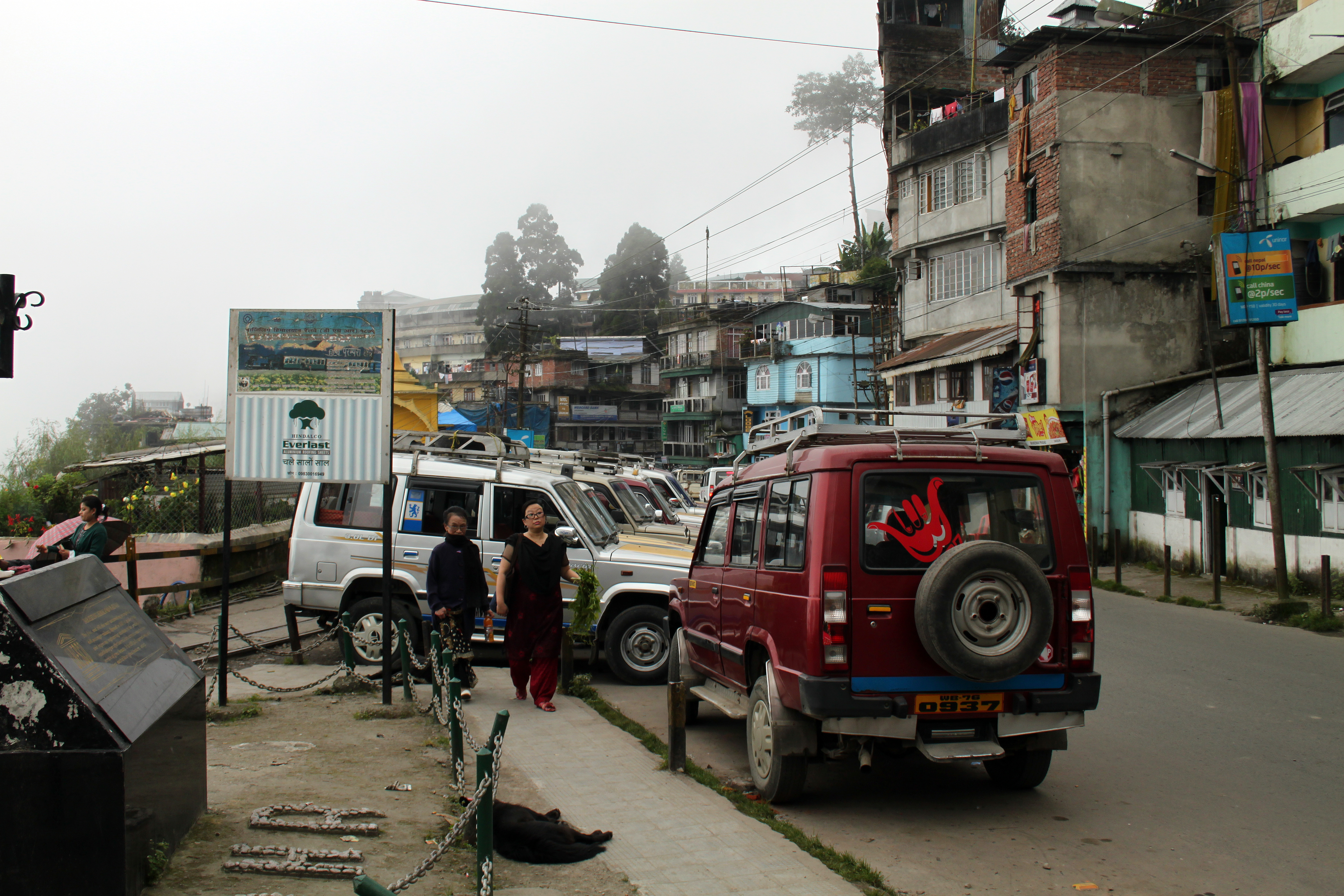
Walking and taxis are the two main forms of getting around.

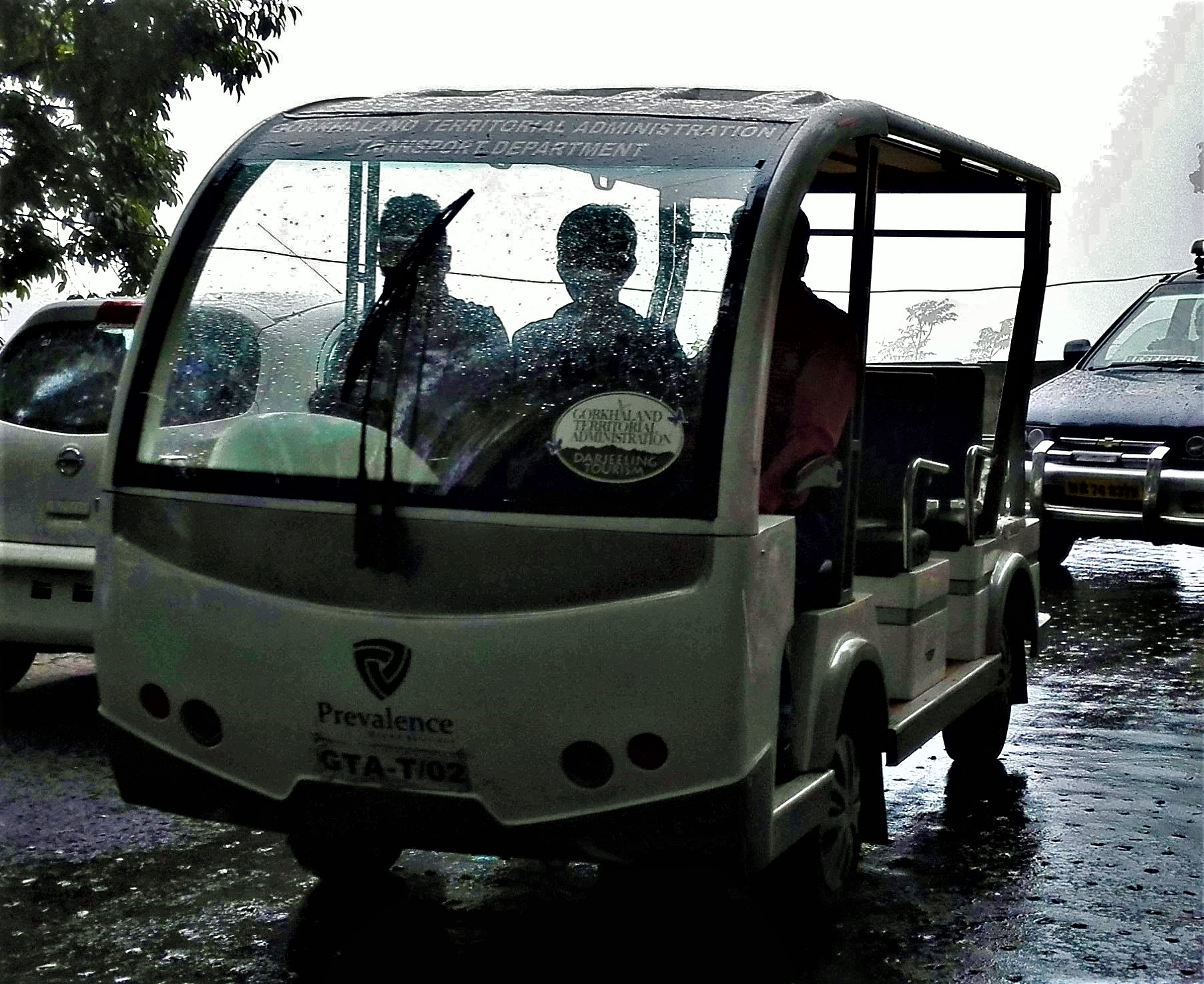
Golf cart-style battery-powered taxi, 2015

Darjeeling has two major arterial roads: Hill Cart Road—which is a continuation of National Highway 110 connecting Siliguri at the base of the Darjeeling hills to Darjeeling—and Lebong Cart Road (see Map 1). The average width of Darjeeling's roads in 2018 was between 6 metres (20 ft) and 7 metres (23 ft). According to a Darjeeling Municipality report of 2008, a little over half (55%) of Darjeeling's roads were both metalled (paved with asphalt, or bitumen) and motorable; the rest were too narrow to admit traffic whether concrete roads or unpaved. There were three parking areas that were not located on the street and 13 on-street. Illegal parking along narrow roads has created congestion for both pedestrians and wheeled transport.

As of 2018, Darjeeling had no public transport system of buses. Less than one in 20 residents owned any form of vehicular transport, two-wheeled or four. For both locals and tourists motorized travel was limited to six- or eight-seater paratransit taxis that have no set routes or timetables. Passengers embark and disembark in the central shopping district of the city, making the area both congested and polluted. In 2015, in an attempt to tackle the pollution, the Gorkhaland Territorial Administration (GTA), which governs the district, introduced three battery-powered street-legal golf-cart-taxis on a trial basis. The taxis had cost approximately Rupees 36 lakh (or $14,670 in the 2015 exchange rate) per vehicle. Although the vehicles were factory-designed for a battery life of 60 kilometres (37 mi) before requiring a recharge, their batteries were found to run out in 5 kilometres (3.1 mi). Chalking up the disparity to the challenges of Darjeeling's steep streets, and the lack of mechanics to correct the malfunction, the administration withdrew the vehicles from the streets in 2016.

Darjeeling can be reached by motorized vehicles on National Highway 110, from Siliguri, 77 km (48 mi) away. Darjeeling has road connections with Bagdogra, Gangtok and Kathmandu and the neighbouring towns of Kurseong and Kalimpong. However, road and railway communications often get disrupted in the monsoons because of landslides. The nearest airport is Bagdogra Airport, located 90 km (56 mi) from Darjeeling.

== Culture ==
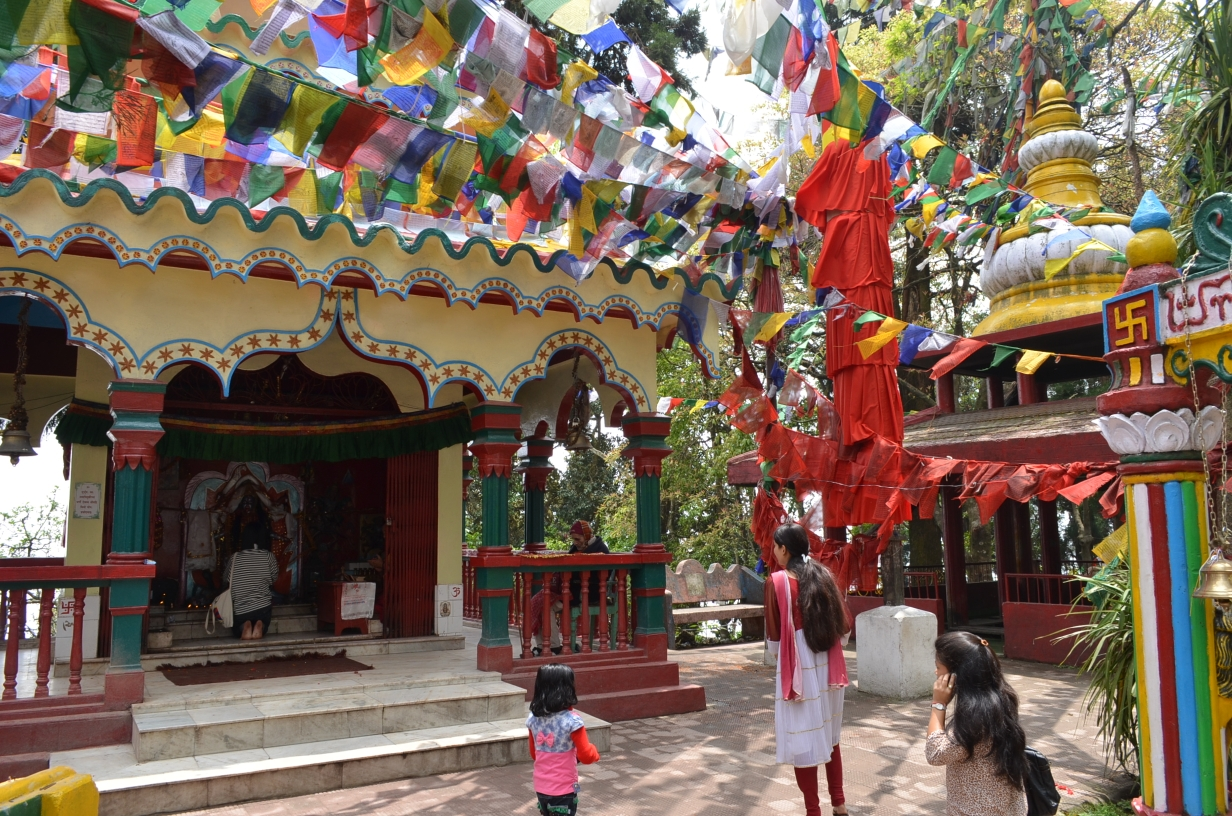
Prayer flags festoon the Mahakal Temple, built 1782

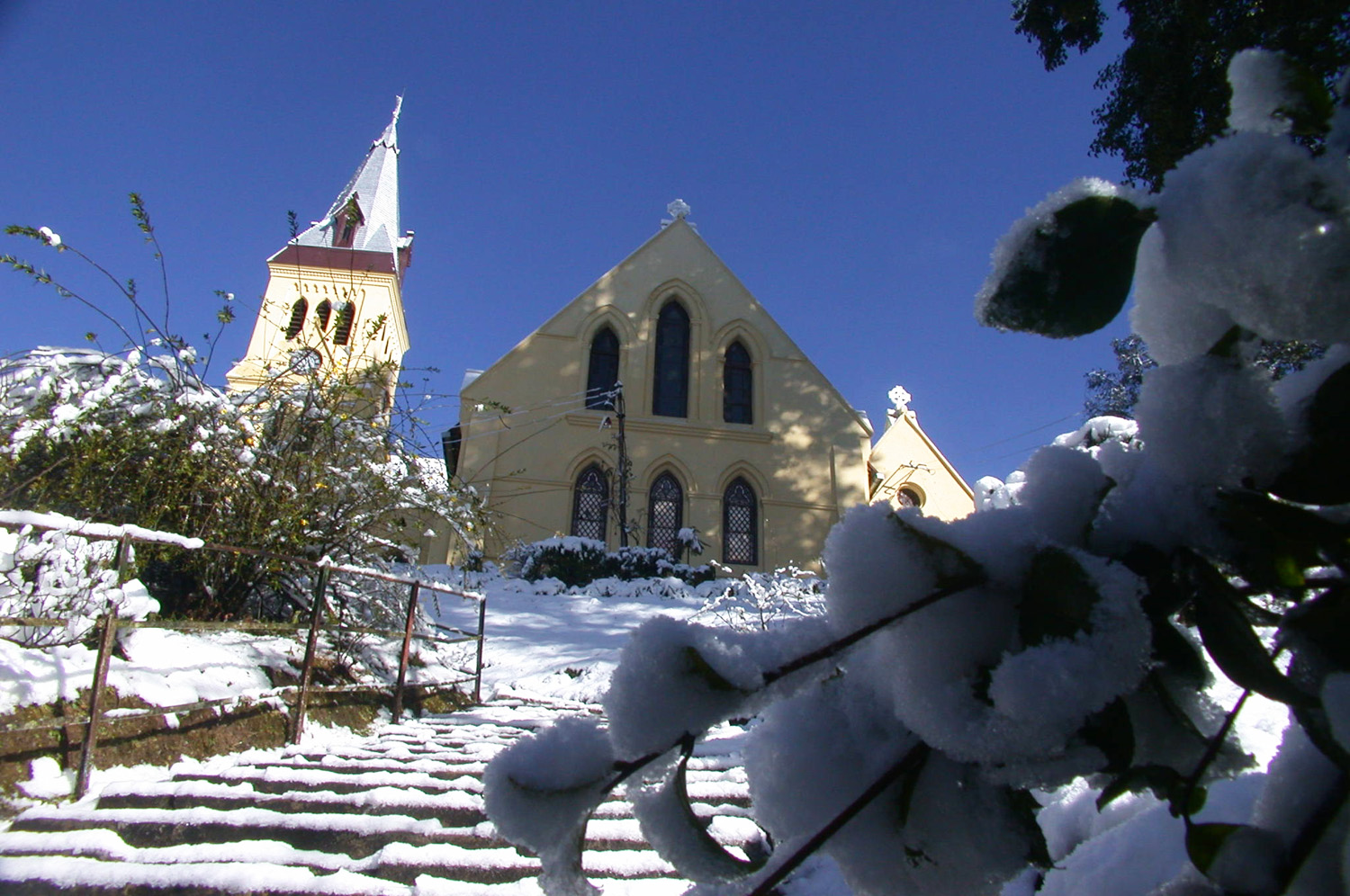
St. Andrew's Church, Darjeeling (founded 1843) during a rare snowfall

The culture of Darjeeling is diverse and includes a variety of indigenous practices and festivals; it has a regional distinctness from the rest of India. Mixing and intermarriage between ethnic groups have led to hybrid cultural forms and practices.

Major festivals are Dashain (Vijayadashami), Tihar (Diwali), Holi, Lakshmi Puja, Maghe Sankranti, Losar, Buddha Jayanti, and Christmas. Tibetan Buddhism is followed by some ethnic groups such as Tibetans, Lepchas, Bhutias, Sherpas, Yolmos, Gurungs, and Tamangs; their common festivals are the Tibetan new year festival Losar, Saga Dawa and Tendong Lho Rumfaat. The Kirati ethnic group Rais, Limbus, Sunuwars and Yakkhas celebrate Udhauli and Ubhauli as their main festival.

Popular Hindu deities are Durga, Kali, and Shiva; other deities with both Hindu and Buddhist influences, such as Manjushri and Macchindranāth, are popular among Newar people, and Gorakhnath, and worshipped by Gorkhas. The Mahakal Temple on Observatory Hill is a pilgrimage site for Hindu and Buddhists. Followers of Tibetan Buddhism, or Lamaism, have established several gompa or monasteries. Ghoom Monastery (8 km or 5 miles from the town), Bhutia Busty monastery, and Mag-Dhog Yolmowa preserve ancient Buddhist scripts. A Peace Pagoda was built in 1992 by the Japanese Buddhist organisation Nipponzan Myohoji. In the Tibetan Refugee Self-Help Centre, Tibetan crafts like carpets, wood and leather work are displayed.

The Darjeeling Initiative, a civil society movement, holds the ten-day Darjeeling Carnival; it celebrates Darjeeling Hill's musical and cultural heritage each year usually in November. A literary culture has matured in the Nepali-speaking population of the Darjeeling region; in 2013, Asit Rai, a resident and Nepali-language writer, was elected to the Sahitya Akademi Fellowship, the highest honour of India's National Academy of Letters.

According to a 2017 study, Western music has long been popular in Darjeeling. In the "lively hippie music scene" in Kathmandu in the late 1960s, some of the earliest "Western pop performers" were from Darjeeling. The earliest Nepali-led hotel bands were from Darjeeling and many among them had played in hotels in Calcutta before. A 2004 study suggested that one possible reason for such leadership might have been that many Nepalis in Darjeeling had become Christians and were no longer bound by Hindu caste prejudices in which "musical performance is associated with low caste standing". By the early 1990s, a common middle-class western popular music culture was much in evidence among the young people of Kathmandu, Nepal and the Nepalese-speaking youth in Darjeeling. (Note: The author of a 2004 study recalled that at a 1991 Kathmandu "Rock and Roll Music Festival", an accomplished band, the "Hell Riders", from Darjeeling had star billing. The crowd became restless when the group played music that appealed to an older audience (The Doors, The Rolling Stones, and Steppenwolf), but sang along when they switched to contemporary popular groups like AC/DC and Bon Jovi.)

Football is the most popular sport in Darjeeling; the annual Gold Cup tournament was once a favourite event in the hills. An improvised form of ball made of rubber bands is often used for playing in the steep streets, and is known as Chungi.

Colonial architecture is exemplified in Darjeeling by cottages, Gothic churches, Planters' Club, the Raj Bhawan and various educational institutions.

=== Food ===
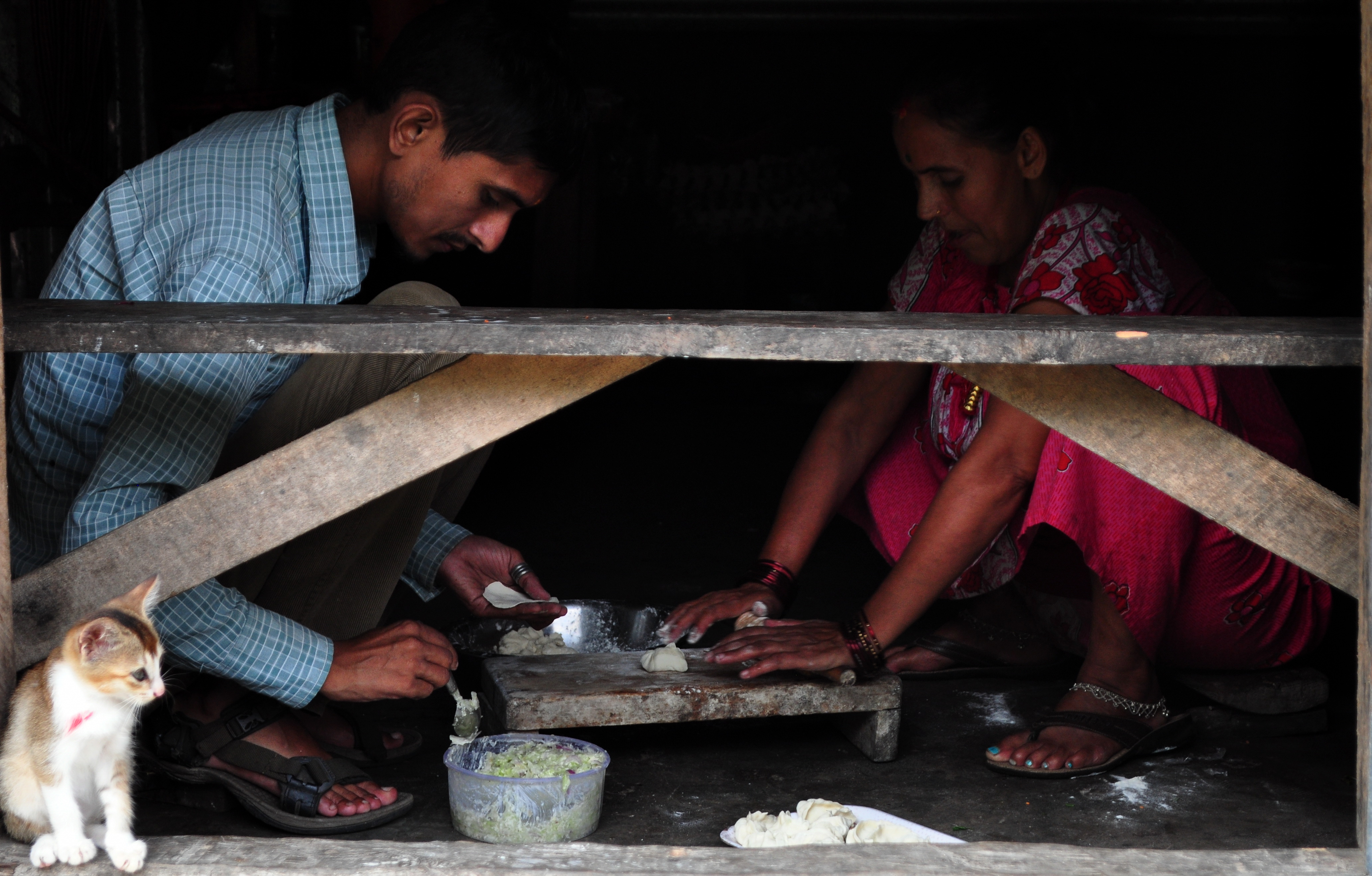
Momos in a roadside stall

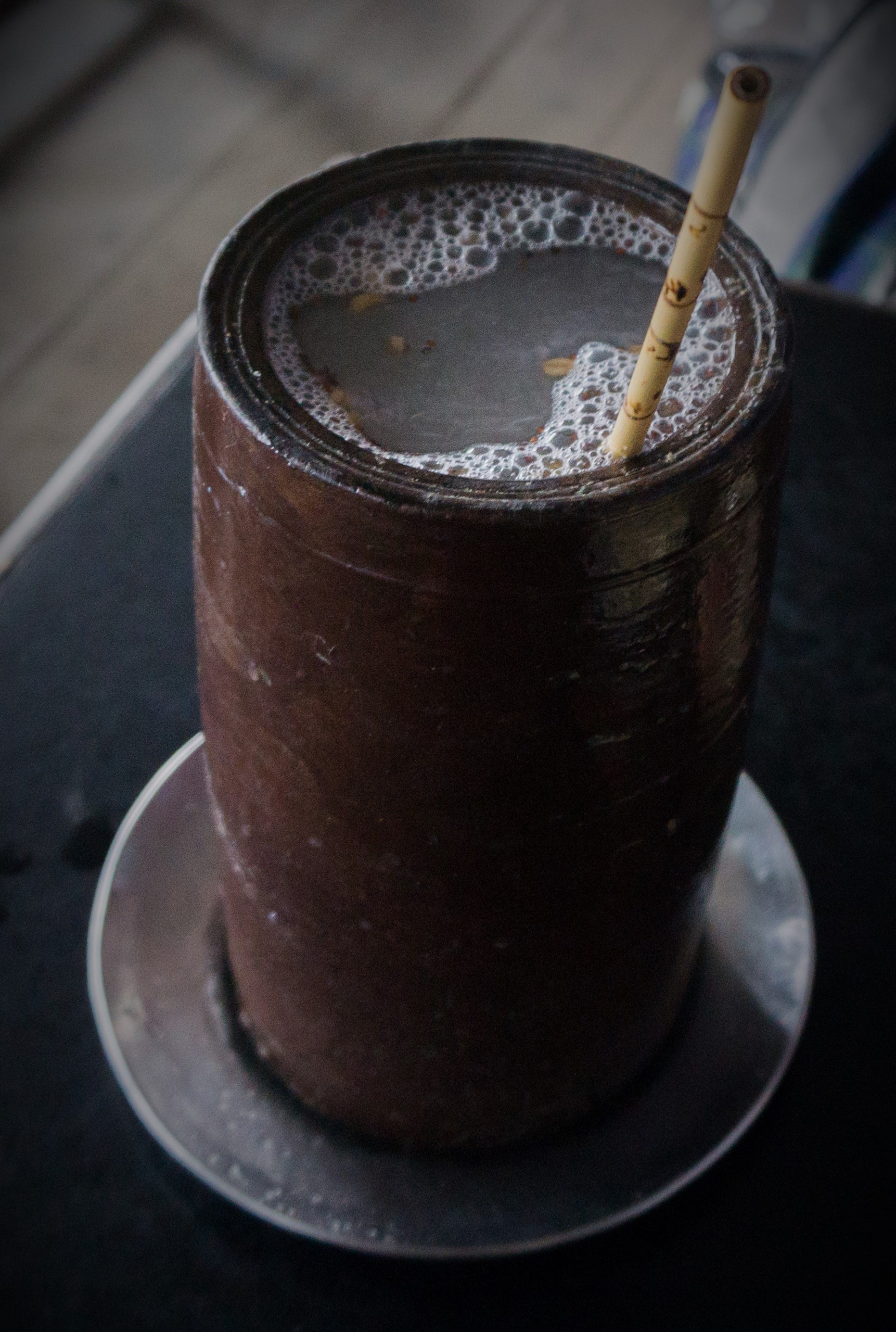
Fermented Tongba

The traditional dietary culture of Darjeeling has much in common with that of the Darjeeling hills, though urbanisation has affected the food habits throughout the region. A mug of tea with milk, with or without sugar, is traditionally the first drink of the day. Butter tea, made from compressed tea leaves, butter, water, milk and salt is a popular delicacy. The staple diet is eaten twice a day. The food in these regions is less spicy, cooked with either little or no oil, and semi-boiled. The first meal is eaten in the morning with cooked rice, dal, cooked vegetables mixed with potatoes, some fermented meat or milk products—dahi, or yoghurt; mohi, which is spicy buttermilk; and chhurpi, a kind of hard cheese made from cow or yak milk—and pickles commonly called bhat-dal-tharkari-achar. The second meal is dinner in the early evening, which consists of the same bhat-dal-tharkari-achar. Bhutia and Lepcha usually eat thukpa noodles in soup.

Traditionally, the people of the region have preferred cooked rice as the staple; however, roti made of wheat is also popular, mostly among the urban population. Cooked ground maize is sometimes eaten as staple food mostly in rural areas, where it might be eaten with mohi and gundruk, a fermented vegetable. Goyang, another fermented food, is made from the leaves of a local wild plant, abundantly available during the monsoon. The leaves are fermented for a month and then consumed for several months afterwards. Boiled with yak meat or beef to make a hearty thukpa soup, it is commonly prepared in Sherpa homes though seldom sold.

Some ethnic foods have cultural value in festivals. Celebration of festivals with the consumption of sel roti, a fermented cereal-based fried doughnut-like confectionery, is a custom of the Gorkha. Dahi, a fermented milk product, is consumed as a savoury addition to daily diets. It is also used by the Gorkha to make a paste with rice and food colour for applying to the foreheads of the younger members of the family by their elders during festivals and marriages. Alcoholic drinks can have a similar dual purpose; in addition to being consumed directly they are offered to gods and in the veneration of the dead. In some communities, they have been employed in spirit possession rituals.

Some Brahmin Gorkhas are vegetarians. Non-vegetarians eat chicken, mutton, buffalo, and pork. Beef is taboo to a majority of the Gorkha except for Tamang and Sherpa. Newar prefers buffalo meat. About two-thirds of people prepare ethnic fermented foods at home for consumption. Cooking is usually done by women. Traditionally members of the family sit together on bamboo mats in the kitchen, and meals are served by the female members of the family and then usually eaten by hand, though chopsticks made of bamboo are commonly used by the Bhutia and Tibetans. Plates are made of brass or have a thin layer of brass.

Popular alcoholic beverages sold in Darjeeling include tongba, Jnaard (pronounced as Jaar) and chhaang, variations of a local beer made from fermenting finger millet. A popular food in Darjeeling is the momo, a steamed dumpling containing pork, beef, chicken or vegetables (cabbage or potatoes) cooked in a doughy wrapping and served with watery soup. Wai-Wai is a packaged snack consisting of noodles which are eaten either dry or in soup form.

== Education ==
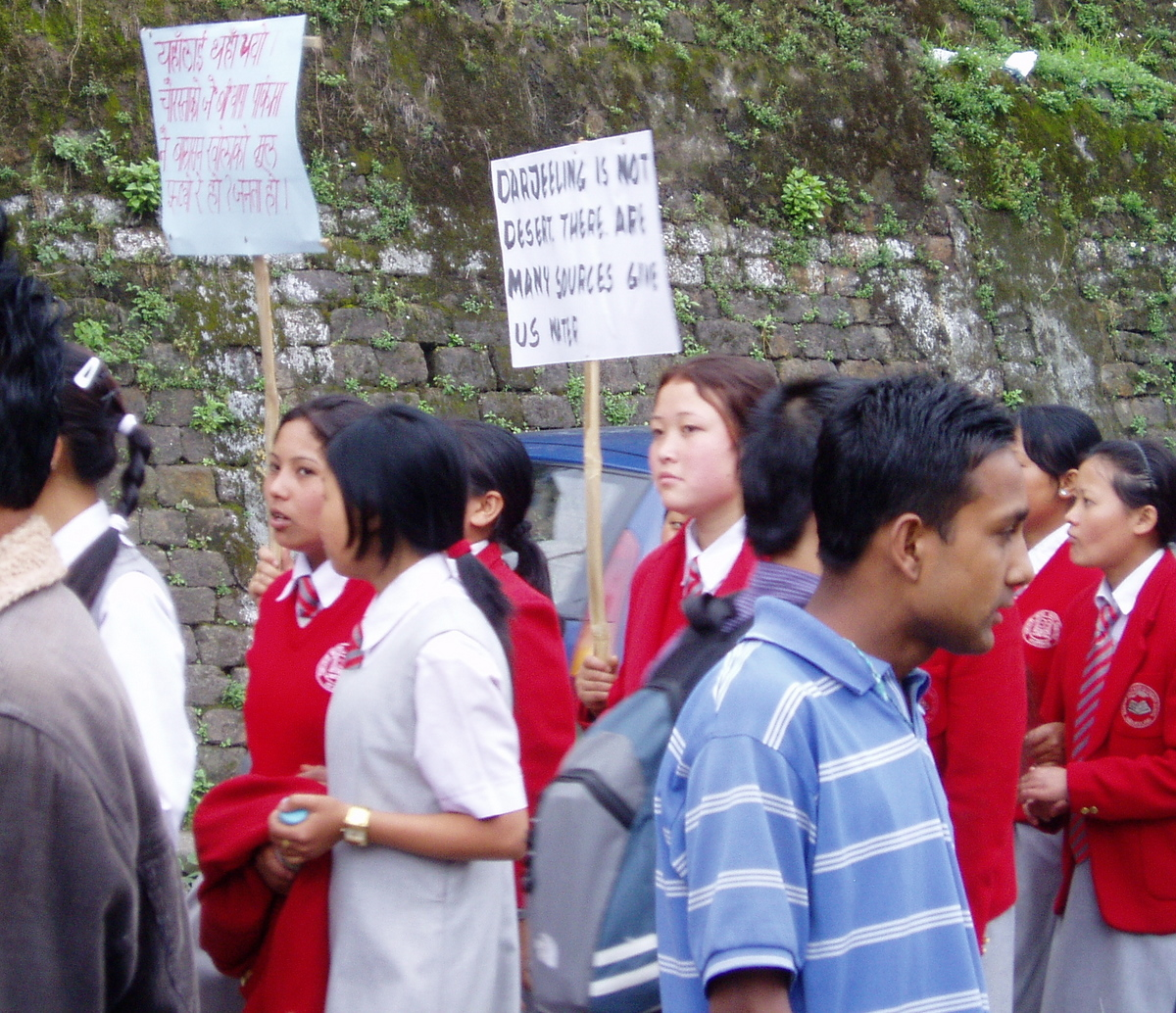
Students join a march for increased water supply in Darjeeling, May 2007

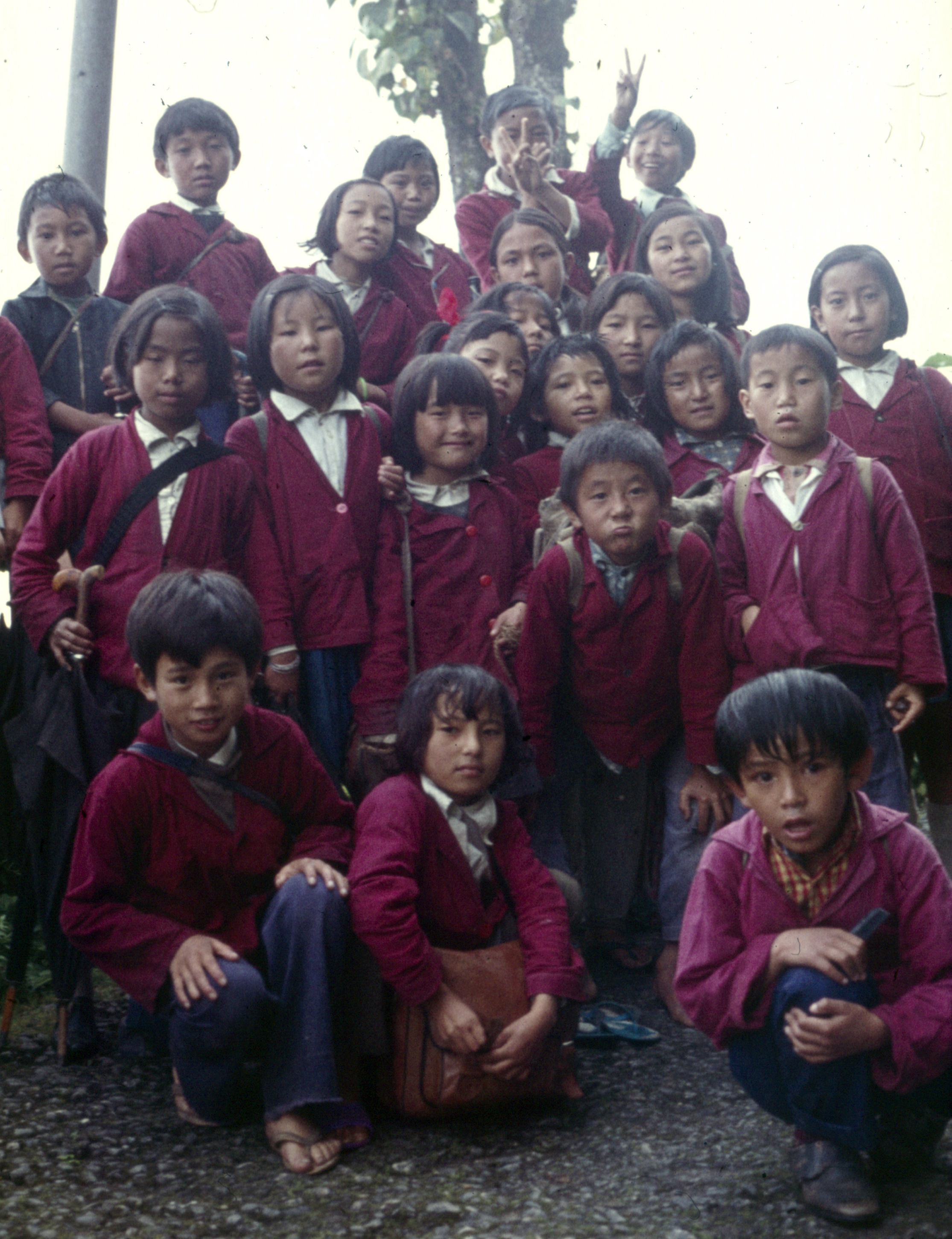
Primary school children in 1976

A study conducted between 2012 and 2014 observed that the elite schools established in Darjeeling during the late 19th century for the education of British children (Note: In the mid-to-late-1800s, missionaries had established schools, churches and welfare centres for British residents.) were offering English-medium instruction of high quality to Indian children. The Jesuit boys' school, St Joseph's (usually called North Point), the Anglican boarding school for boys, St Paul's, the co-educational Methodist school Mount Hermon, and the Catholic girls' school Loreto Convent (see Map 1) were attracting students from faraway places, including Burma and Thailand. North Point and Loreto had established colleges, St. Joseph's College and Loreto College (now Southfield College); these along with the Darjeeling Government College, a co-educational college founded in 1948, made up the three colleges of Darjeeling. All were affiliated to University of North Bengal in Siliguri. The same study suggested that the private schools were no longer catering only to children of the affluent. Some lower-middle-class families in Darjeeling were sending their children to North Point and Loreto, despite their high fees, in order to give them better future opportunities.

By 2014, colleges had increased the enrollment of students from rural backgrounds. In fields such as engineering and computer science, the local colleges, however, were less able to offer the professional training or career placement facilities of India's growth centres, which had caused some students to leave Darjeeling after high school.

In the Darjeeling municipality in 2003–2004, there were 16,015 students in primary schools, 5,169 in higher-secondary schools, and 3,825 in colleges and universities. According to a 2013 study, few students attended college for there seemed little scope for realizing "middle-class aspirations in Darjeeling through educational credentials". It noted that the fees in the better-funded private colleges, although affordable for the upper-level government officials or successful businesspersons, were too high for the lower-middle-classes in town. This put pressure on the only affordable college, the government college in the town's centre. It was lower-priced but poorly funded, with broken windows, leaking roofs, and absent teachers, causing the students to feel neglected and affecting their attendance. The teachers for their part were unable to meet the extra demands placed on them.

A 2022 study noted that among the population of Darjeeling that lives in slums (comprising 11.72% of the city's population as per the 2011 census), 13% had finished primary school but had gone no further, 45% had finished high school (grade 10) but no further, 13% had finished higher-secondary (grade 10+2), and 10% had been to college. A 2018 study reported that the water crisis in the Darjeeling town has especially affected adolescent girl students who go to government schools. Many do not have access to hygiene facilities such as toilets and bathrooms, either in their homes or at school, particularly for hygiene management during menstruation. The study found that most toilets in government schools were not usable and that no government schools had "proper sanitary facilities for girls. There is no system of water in the toilets and no arrangement for cleaning the toilets daily." It stated that many girls do not drink water during the day for fear of having to use the school toilets.

Most tea plantations make no more than lower primary school instruction available on site. As a result, tea garden workers have typically had fewer opportunities for education. As of 2022, a little over a third of the female workforce and half the male were educated up to grade 8. The workers attributed this to their tea garden's remoteness and lack of means in the family during their childhood. Some families have raised chickens or livestock or opened a corner shop to make more money; their children have gone to nearby towns to study in private schools in which the medium of instruction is English, which is thought to offer better career opportunities. The Nepali language was accepted as a teaching language in all primary schools with a Nepali-speaking majority in the Darjeeling district in 1935.
