= Culture of Darjeeling =

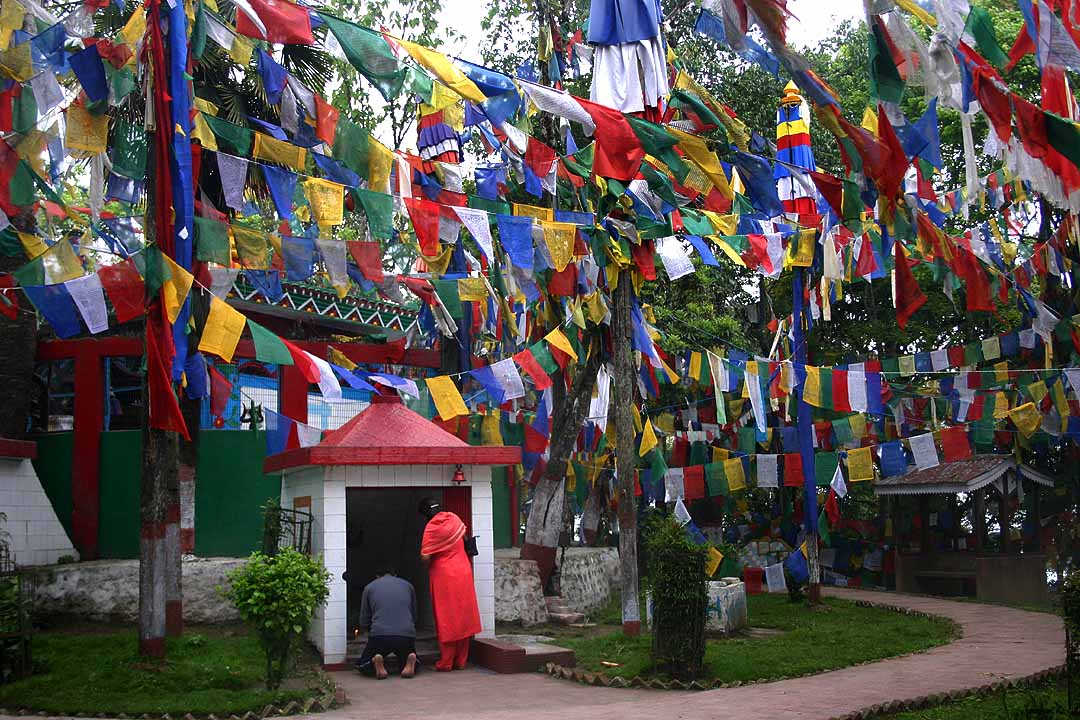
Colourful Buddhist prayer flags around Mahakal Temple at Observatory Hill, Darjeeling.

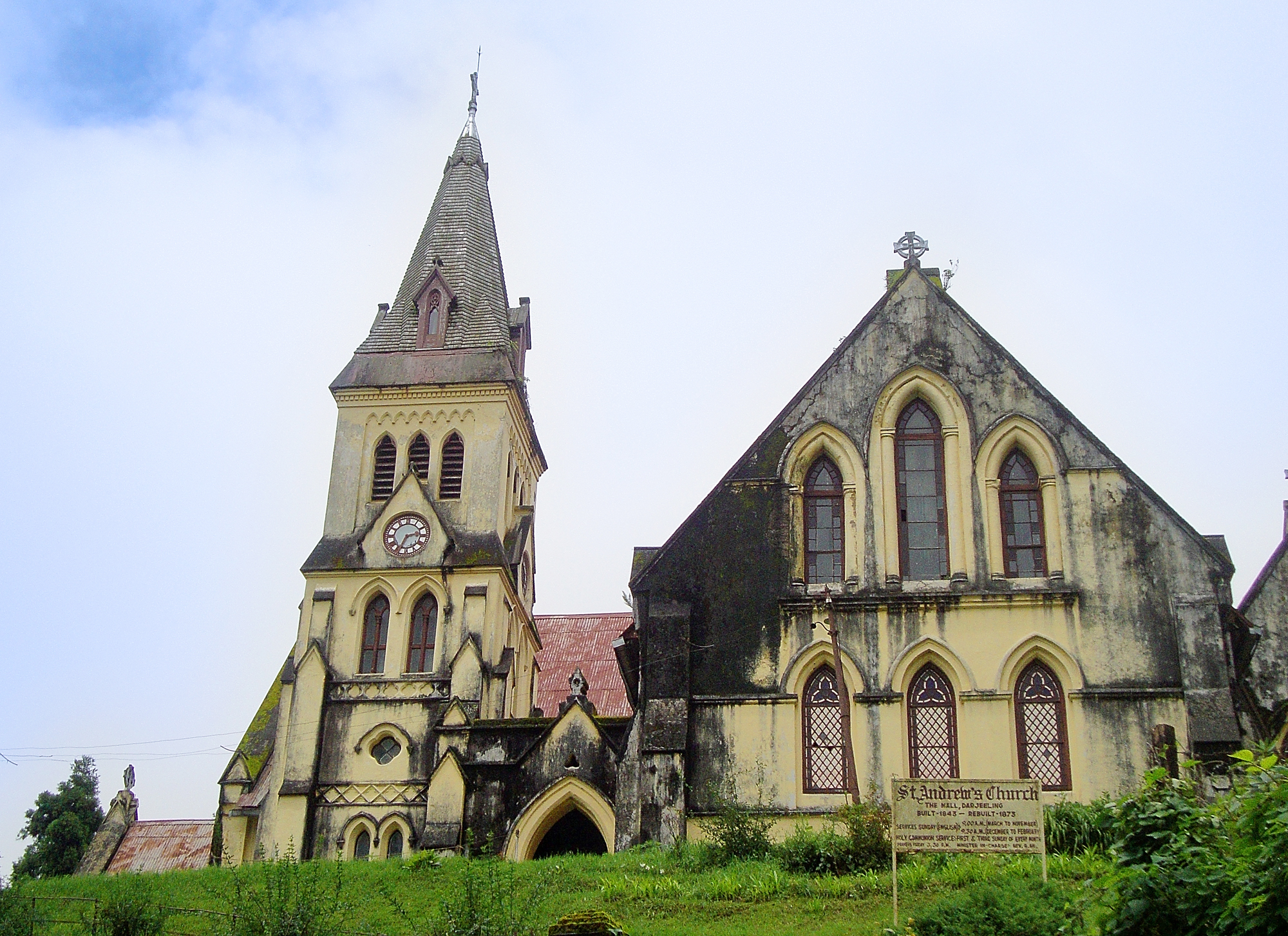
St. Andrew's Church, Darjeeling. Built- 1843, Rebuilt- 1873

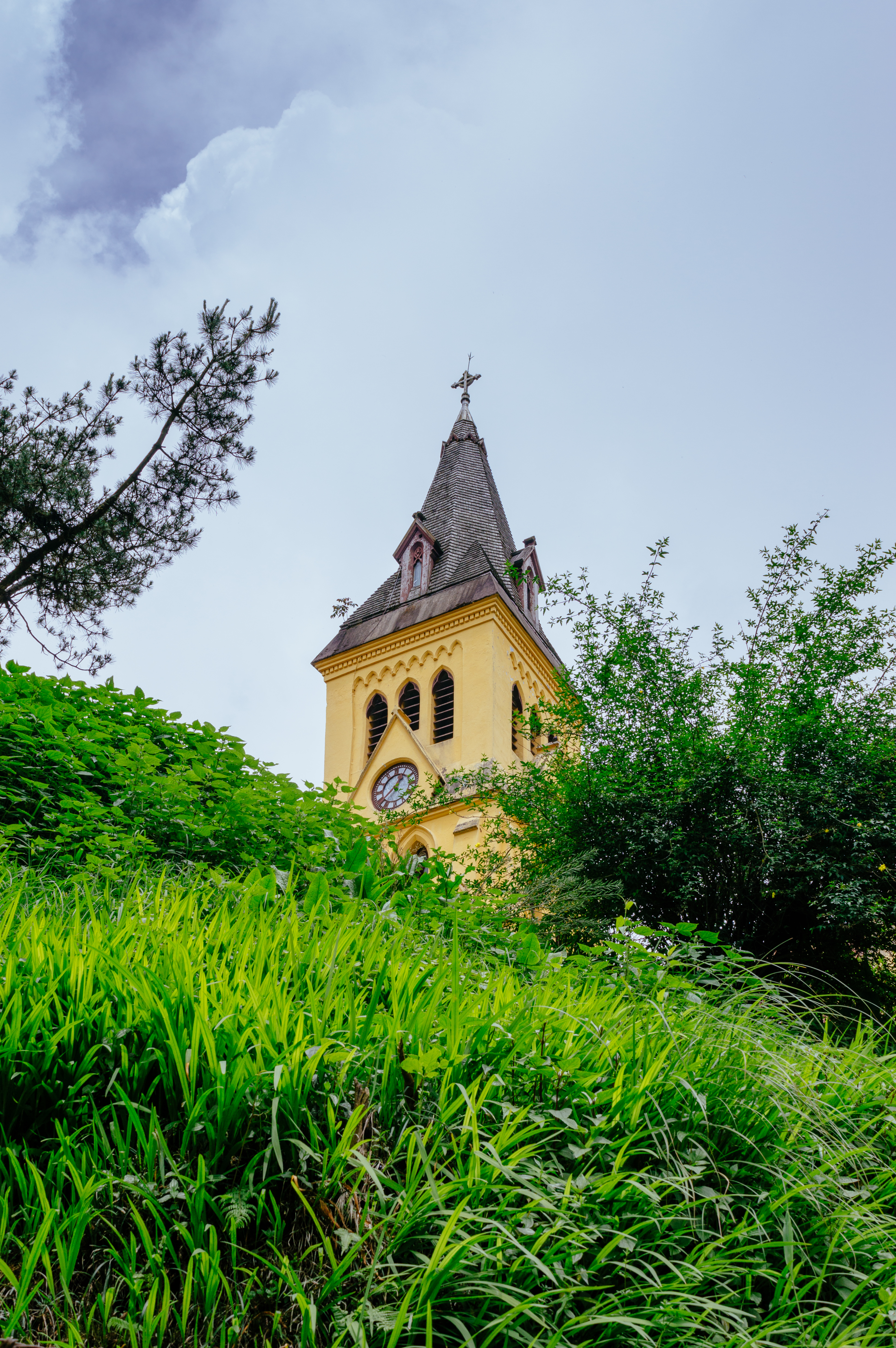
St. Andrew's Church, Darjeeling. A view from the downhill side road, May'17

The culture of Darjeeling, India, is diverse and has a regional distinctness.

== Festivals ==
The two predominant religions of Darjeeling are Hinduism and Vajrayana Buddhism. Dashain, Tihar, Buddha Jayanti, Christmas, Holi, Ram Navami, etc. are the main festivals. Besides them, the diverse ethnic populace of the town also celebrates several local festivals. Buddhist ethnic groups such as the Lepchas, Bhutias, Sherpas, Yolmos, Gurungs, and Tamangs celebrate new year called Losar in January/February through festivals called Maghe Sankranti, Chotrul Duchen, and Tendong Lho Rumfaat. The Kirati ethnic groups such as Limbu (Subba), Yakkha, Sunuwar, Rai (Khambu) celebrate their festivals of Ubhauli Udhauli, Sakela and Chasok Tangnam etc. Deusi/Bhailo are songs performed by men and women, respectively, during the festival of Tihar.

Darjeeling Carnival, initiated by a civil society movement known as The Darjeeling Initiative, was a ten-day carnival held yearly during winter that portrayed the rich musical and cultural heritage of Darjeeling Hills as its central theme. Every year, cultural festivals are held in the town of Darjeeling and its surrounding areas.

== Cuisine ==
The people of Darjeeling consume a diverse variety of foods. Each ethnic group has its own distinct traditional food. A popular food in Darjeeling is the momo, a steamed dumpling containing chicken, mutton, pork, beef or vegetables cooked in a doughy wrapping served with a watery vegetable soup and spicy tomato sauce/chutney. Indigenous fermented food products such as gundruk (fermented and dried leafy vegetable), kinema (fermented soybean), and sinki (fermented and dried radish) are consumed by the people. Wai-Wai is a favorite packaged snack of Darjeeling hills comprising noodles that are eaten either dry or with soup. Hard chhurpi, a type of hard cheese made from cow or yak's milk, is another popular mini-snack that is both nutritious and masticatory. Soft chhurpi, a traditional soft cheese, is consumed along with green vegetables as savoury dishes, used as filling for momos, ground with tomatoes and chillies for chutney or made into a refreshing soup. A type of noodle called thukpa, served with soup and vegetables/meat, is extremely popular in and around the hills of Darjeeling. There are a number of restaurants offering a variety of traditional Indian, Continental and Indian Chinese cuisine to cater to tourists. Tea is the most popular beverage, procured from the famed Darjeeling tea gardens, as well as coffee. Chhang or jaanr is a local alcoholic beverage made from fermented millet, maize or rice.

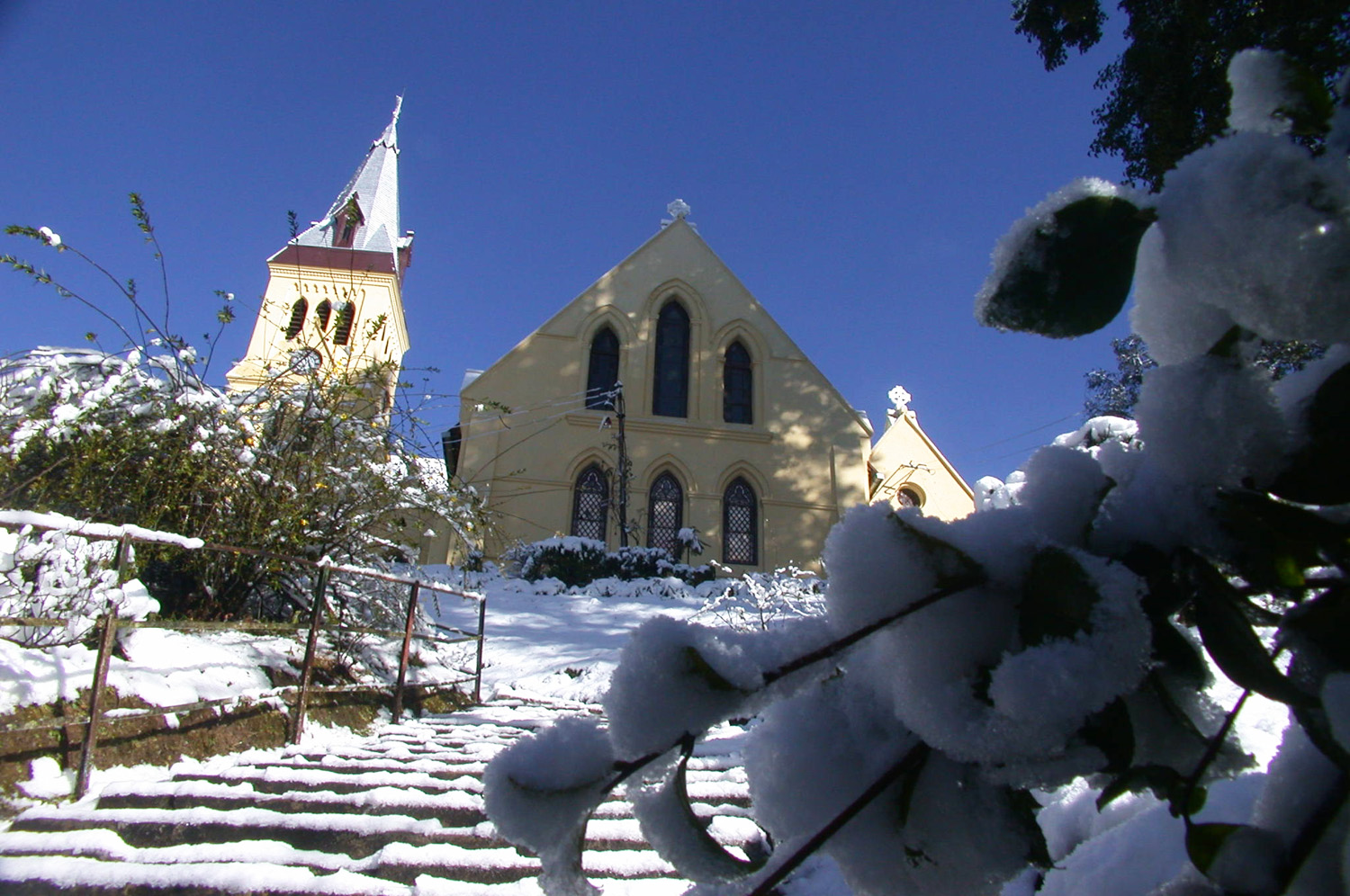
St. Andrew's Church, Darjeeling: During snowfall

== Architecture ==
Colonial architecture characterizes many buildings in Darjeeling; several cottages, Gothic churches, the Raj Bhawan (Governor House), Planters' Club and various educational institutions are examples. Buddhist monasteries showcase the pagoda-style architecture.

== Music ==
Darjeeling is regarded as a center of music and a hotbed for musicians and music admirers. Singing and playing musical instruments is a common pastime among the resident population, who take pride in the traditions and role of music in their cultural life. The varied ethnic groups have different types of songs and dances, often associated with festivals. Some dances of Nepali origin include Maruni, Dhan dance, Jhankri, Yatra, Damphu (Tamang selo), Balan, Deora, Khukuri, Pancha Buddha, Dhimay, Sangini, Chutki, Jhyaure, Sakhiya. Western music is popular among the younger generation, and Darjeeling is a major center of Nepali rock music. Prashant Tamang, the winner of Indian Idol 3, is a resident of Darjeeling.

== Sports ==
Football is the most popular sport in Darjeeling. An improvised form of ball made of rubber bands is often used for playing in steep streets, and is known as Chungi.

== Films ==
Darjeeling is also a popular setting for Bollywood and Bengali films. Noted Bengali film director Satyajit Ray shot his film Kanchenjungha (1962) here. Bollywood movies such as Aradhana (1969), Raju Ban Gaya Gentleman (1992), Main Hoon Na (2004), Parineeta (2005), Barfi! (2012), Yaariyan (2014) and Jagga Jasoos (2017) were partially filmed in town.

== Places of interest ==
Some notable places to visit include the following:

- Tiger Hill (a panoramic view of Mount Everest and Mount Kanchenjunga together),
- Padmaja Naidu Himalayan Zoological Park (notable for conservation of red pandas), monasteries, and the tea gardens.
- The town attracts trekkers and sportsmen seeking to explore the Himalayas, serving as the starting point for climbing attempts on some Indian and Nepali peaks. Tenzing Norgay, one of the two men to first climb Mount Everest, spent most of his adult life in the Sherpa community in Darjeeling. His success provided the impetus to establish the Himalayan Mountaineering Institute in Darjeeling in 1954.
- In the Tibetan Refugee Self-Help Centre, Tibetan crafts like carpets, wood, and leather work are displayed.
- Colonial architecture is exemplified in Darjeeling by cottages, St. Andrew's Church, Darjeeling Gothic churches, Planters' Club, the Raj Bhawan and various educational institutions.
- Several monasteries like Ghoom Monastery (8 km or 5 miles from the town), Bhutia Busty monastery, Mag-Dhog Yolmowa preserve ancient Buddhist scripts. A Peace Pagoda was built in 1992 by the Japanese Buddhist organisation Nipponzan Myohoji. The Mahakal Temple on Observatory Hill is a pilgrimage site for Hindu and Buddhists.
- Hungarian orientalist and bodhisattva Sándor Kőrösi Csoma died in Darjeeling on 11 April 1842, and was buried in Darjeeling Old Cemetery.

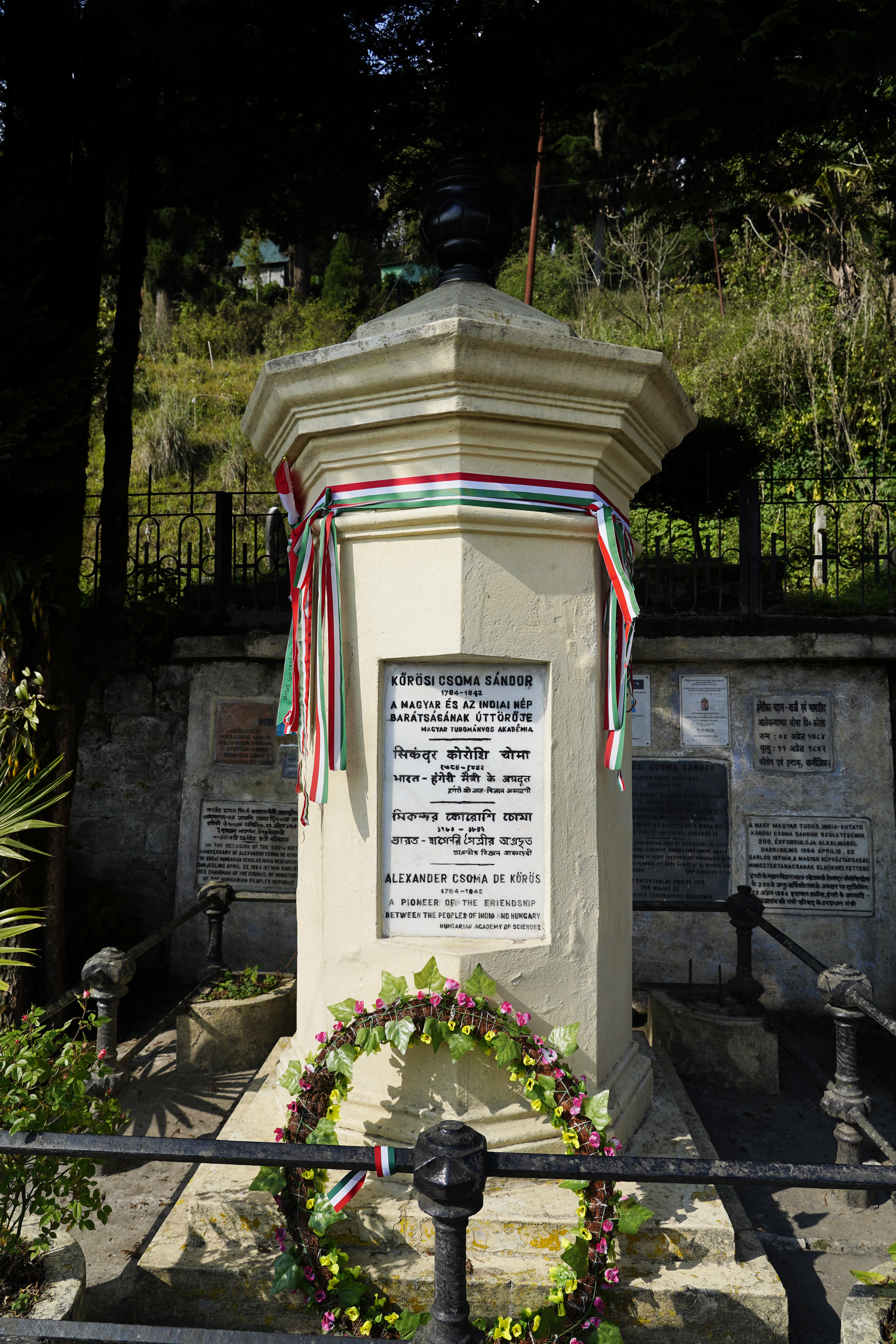
Monument erected over the tomb of Sándor Kőrösi Csoma at Darjeeling Old Cemetery (2023)

Although tourists have come to Darjeeling in vastly greater numbers after India's economic liberalisation, they have spent less on average, resulting in Darjeeling's luxury tourism increasingly giving way to mass tourism. Since 2012, Darjeeling has once again witnessed a steady inflow of both domestic and international tourists. As of 2015, around 50,000 foreign and 500,000 domestic tourists visit Darjeeling each year, the so-called "Queen of the Hills" continuing to appeal strongly to the imagination of tourists.

== See also ==
Chowrasta

Culture of West Bengal
