= Culture of West Bengal =

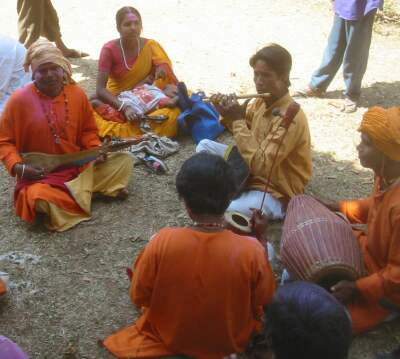
Baul singers at Shantiniketan

The culture of West Bengal is an Indian culture which has its roots in Bengali literature, music, fine arts, drama and cinema. It is intertwined with the culture of the Bengal region of the Indian subcontinent. Different geographic regions of West Bengal have subtle as well as more pronounced variations between each other, with Darjeeling Himalayan hill region and Duars showing particularly different socio-cultural aspects.

West Bengal's capital Kolkata—as the former capital of India—was the birthplace of modern Indian literary and artistic thought, and is referred to as the "cultural [or literary] capital of India". The presence of paras, which are cluster of neighbourhoods that possess a strong sense of community, is characteristic of West Bengal. Typically, each para has its own community club and, on occasion, a playing field. Residents engage in addas, or leisurely chats, that often take the form of freestyle intellectual conversation. However, with the growth of apartments, expansion of neighbourhoods and rapid urbanisation, this culture is on decline.

== Literature ==
The Bengali language boasts a rich literary heritage, shared with neighbouring Bangladesh. West Bengal has a long tradition in Bengali literature, evidenced by the Charyapada, Mangalkavya, Shunya Purana, Shreekrishna Kirtana, Krittibasi Ramayana, Kashidasi Mahabharata, Chaitanya Charitamrita, Khanar Bachan, Thakurmar Jhuli, and stories related to Gopal Bhar. In the nineteenth and twentieth century, Bengali literature was modernised in the works of authors such as Bankim Chandra Chattopadhyay, Michael Madhusudan Dutt, Rabindranath Tagore, Kazi Nazrul Islam, and Sharat Chandra Chattopadhyay. Coupled with social reforms led by Ram Mohan Roy, Swami Vivekananda, and others, this constituted a major part of the Bengal Renaissance. The middle and latter parts of the 20th century witnessed the arrival of post-modernism, as well as literary movements such as those espoused by the Kallol movement, hungryalists and the little magazines.

== Theater and films ==
Bengal has a long tradition of indigenous theatre that dates back to the 1770s and consists of popular tales enacted through dance, music, and narration. Modern theatre was introduced by Europeans in the mid-19th century and sustained by colonial educational institutions. The mythological and historical plays dominated the last quarter of the 19th and first quarter of the 20th century, but gradually gave way to urban middle-class predilections in society. The Indian People’s Theatre Association (IPTA) was founded in 1943 and produced plays with far-reaching impacts. In the 1950s, amateur group theatre emerged to address contemporary sociopolitical and financial issues. Star Theatre, Academy of Fine Arts, Rabindra Sadan, Nahabat, and Girish Manch are the most popular Bengali theatres, known for their development and socially conscious plays. Among other types of theatre, West Bengal has a tradition of folk drama known as jatra. Kolkata is the home of the Bengali cinema industry, dubbed "Tollywood" for Tollygunj, where most of the state's film studios are located. Its long tradition of art films includes globally acclaimed film directors such as Academy Award-winning director Satyajit Ray, Ritwik Ghatak, Mrinal Sen, Tapan Sinha, and contemporary directors such as Aparna Sen, Buddhadeb Dasgupta, Goutam Ghose, Koushik Ganguly, Rituparno Ghosh, Anjan Dutt, Kamaleswar Mukherjee, Sandip Ray. Uttam Kumar was the most popular lead actor for decades, and his romantic pairing with actress Suchitra Sen in films attained legendary status. Soumitra Chatterjee, who acted in many Satyajit Ray-films, and Prosenjit Chatterjee are among other popular lead male actors. As of 2020, Bengali films have won India's annual National Film Award for Best Feature Film twenty-two times in sixty seven years, the highest among all Indian languages.

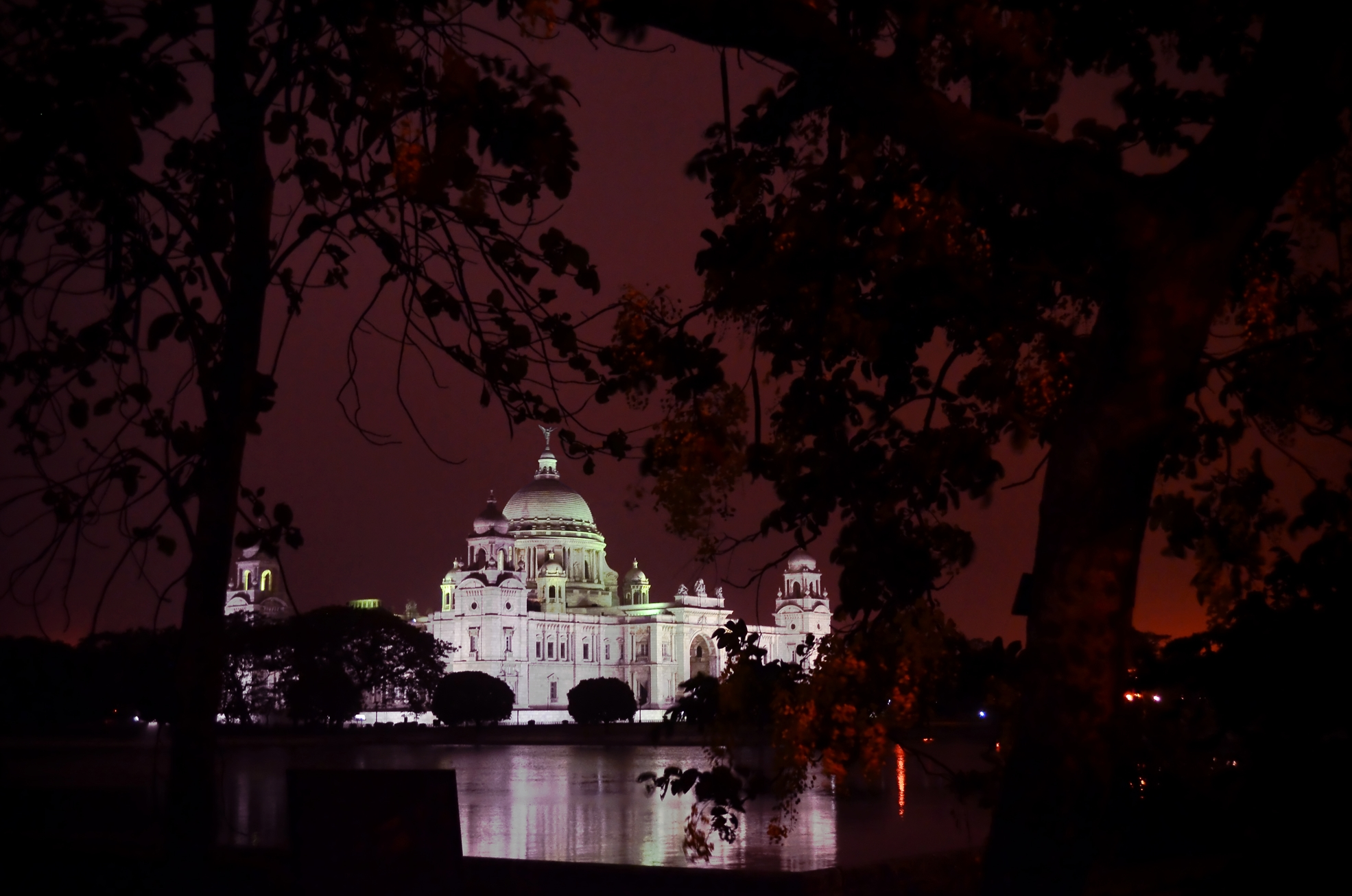
The Victoria Memorial in Kolkata

== Music ==
The Baul tradition is a unique heritage of Bengali folk music, which has also been influenced by regional music traditions. Other folk music forms include Kabigaan, Gombhira, Bhawaiya, kirtans, and Gajan festival music. Folk music in West Bengal is often accompanied by the ektara, a one-stringed instrument. West Bengal also has a heritage in North Indian classical music. The state is recognised for its appreciation of rabindrasangeet (songs written by Rabindranath Tagore) and Indian classical music. Nazrul Geeti is another classical music of Bengal, which is written and composed by poet Kazi Nazrul Islam. He was person in Bengal music who created the first Bengali ghazals.

Generally all music dedicated to goddess Mother Kali is called 'Shyama Sangeet' in Bengali. Two famous singers of this Bengali Shyama Sangeet are Pannalal Bhattacharya and Dhananjay Bhattacharya. Pannalal Bhattacharya's elder brother Prafulla Bhattacharya and middle brother Dhananjay Bhattacharya were the first music teachers of saint artist Pannalal Bhattacharya. Dhananjay Bhattacharya stopped singing devotional songs after finding devotional spirit in his brother Pannalal. However, after the demise of Pannalal Bhattacharya, he contributed again in Bengali music with many devotional songs by his sweet, melodious voice.

Popular music genres include adhunik songs. Since the early 1990s, new genres have emerged, including one comprising alternative folk–rock Bengali bands. Another new style, jibonmukhi gaan ("songs about life"), is based on realism. UNESCO selected The Rural Craft Hub of Bengal to showcase their artwork in Paris in 2015.

== Dance ==
West Bengal is known for its diverse culture, and dance plays a significant role in showcasing this. Each region has its own unique dance form that not only reflects the culture and history of the area but also incorporates worldwide themes. The Brita dance is a traditional folk dance performed by women to seek blessings from the Gods for their children's wishes to come true or to celebrate recovery from illness. The Gambhira dance is a devotional folk dance that addresses social, political, and moral issues of contemporary society, and it is popular during festivals in North Bengal. The Santhal dance celebrates nature and addresses gender issues and land rights, and it is performed by both men and women of the Santhali tribe. The Lathi dance is a well-known form of dance that expresses various emotions of human life, including celebration, anger, pain, and love. Finally, the Chhau is a widely practised tribal dance that incorporates martial arts, athletics, and religion, with stories taken from the great epics of the Ramayana and the Mahabharata.

== Attire ==
Though Bengali women traditionally wear the special Benarasi sari and Jamdani, Western attire has gained acceptance among younger and professional women. Western-style dress has greater acceptance among men, although the traditional costumes like dhoti, panjabi, kurta, pyjama and lungi are seen during weddings and major festivals. Like any other metropolis, Kolkata also has an eclectic mix of western wears with a tinge of ethnic wears. People are found dressed in jeans along with kurtas, or sari along with an overcoat.

== Festivals and celebrations ==
West Bengal is celebrates many festivals as part of its culture. Some festivals are celebrated statewide, while others are local in nature. There are also various other village fairs and seasonal tribal festivals. Durga Puja is the most important festival of West Bengal, and it features colourful pandals, decorative idols of Hindu goddess Durga and her family, lighting decoration and immersion processions. Other major festivals are Kali Puja, Diwali, Dol, Saraswati Puja, Jagaddhatri Puja, Rath Jatra, Kojagori Lakshmi Puja, Vishwakarma Puja, Poush Parbon, Poila Boishakh, Christmas. Kolkata Book Fair, Kolkata International Film Festival and Dover Lane Music Festival are major annual cultural events of Kolkata, whereas Poush Mela, Ganga Sagar Mela, Jhapan are some of the major annual fairs of the state. The diverse ethnic populace of Darjeeling Himalayan hill region celebrates several local festivals such as Losar, Dusshera or Fulpati, Tihar, Ram Navami, Maghe Sankranti, Chotrul Duchen, Buddha Jayanti, Tendong Lho Rumfaat, Eid al-Fitr etc.

Durga Puja, biggest festival of West Bengal

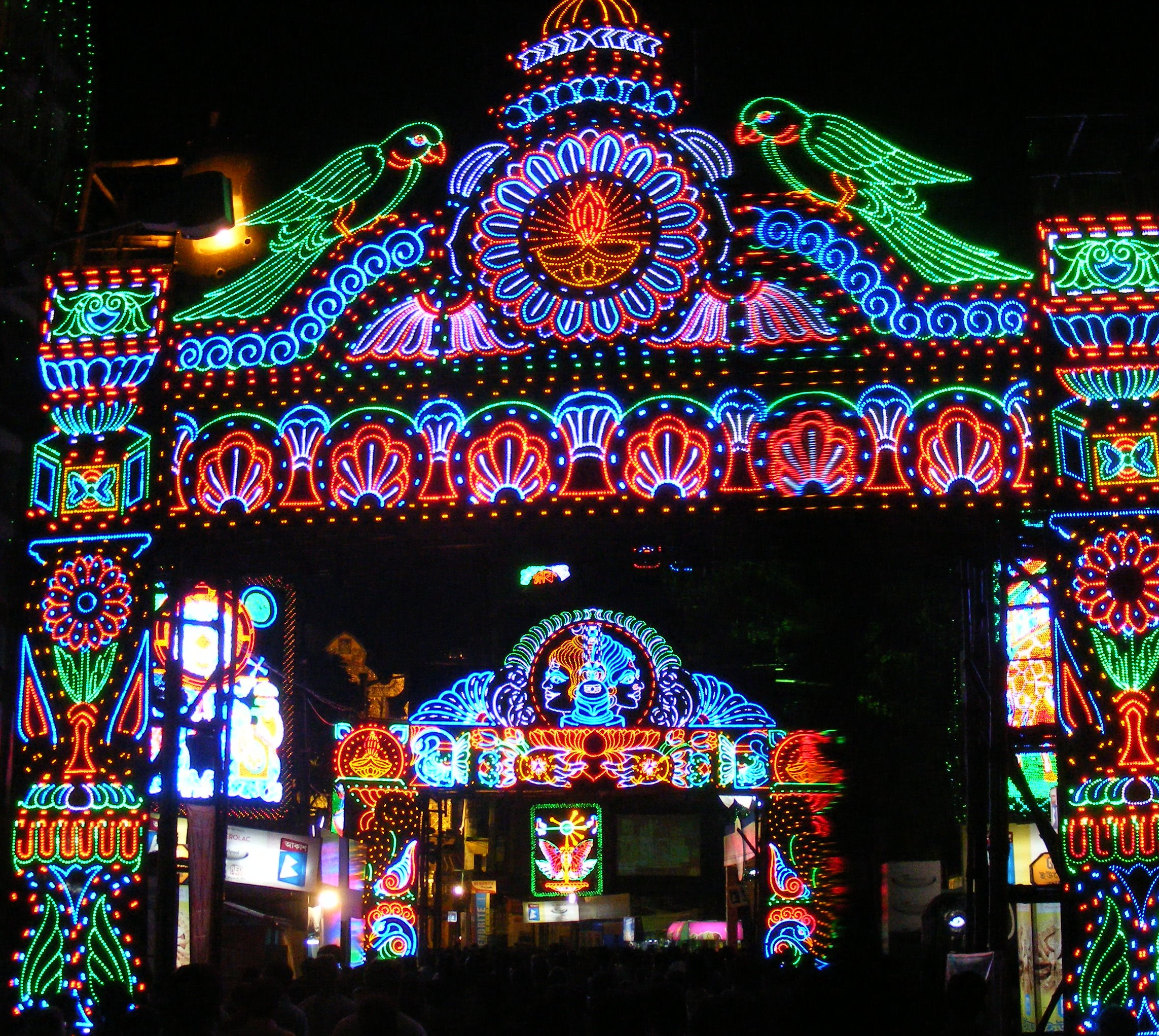
Glittering lighting decorations during Durga Puja.

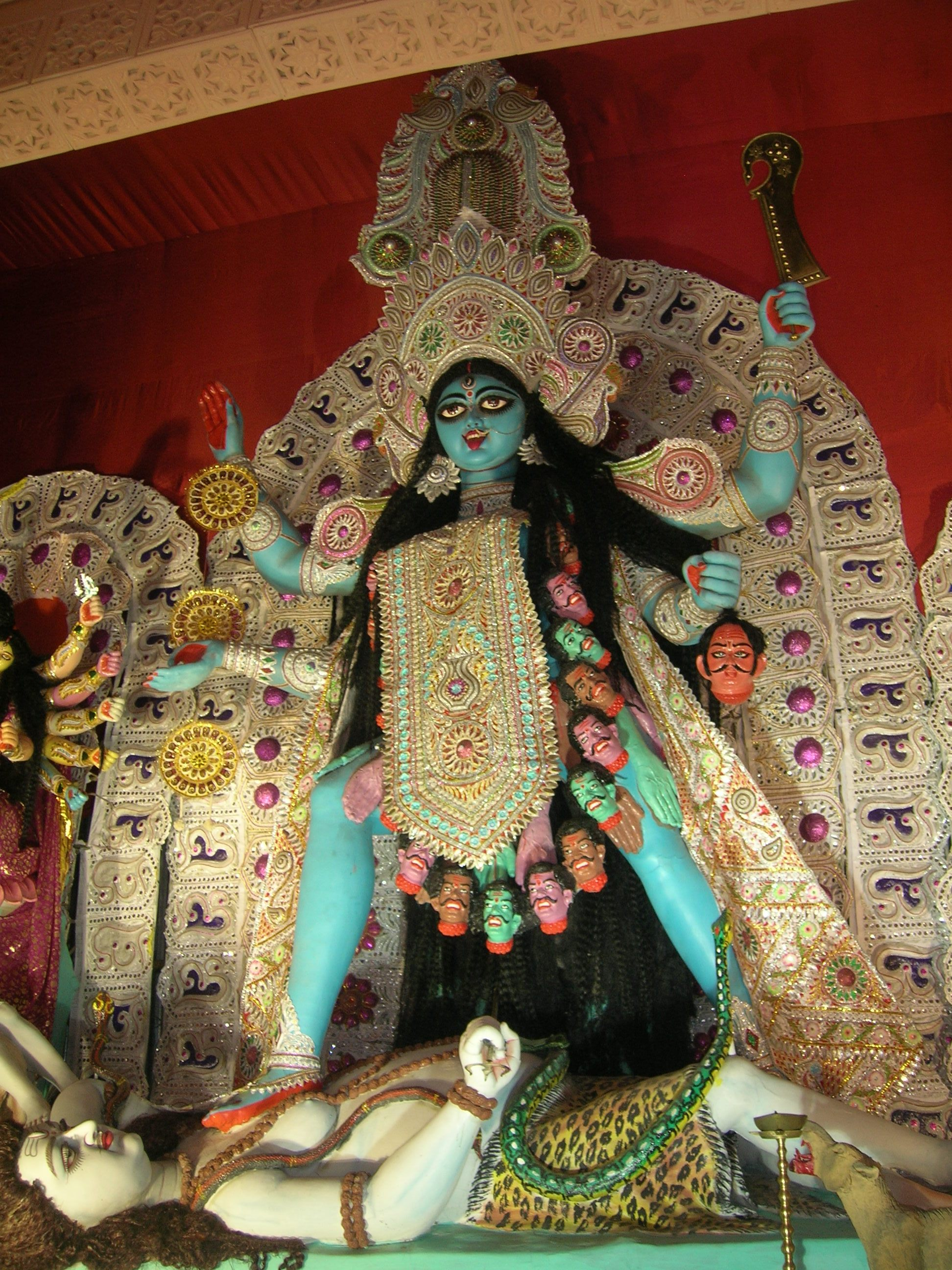
Kali Puja, a major festival of West Bengal

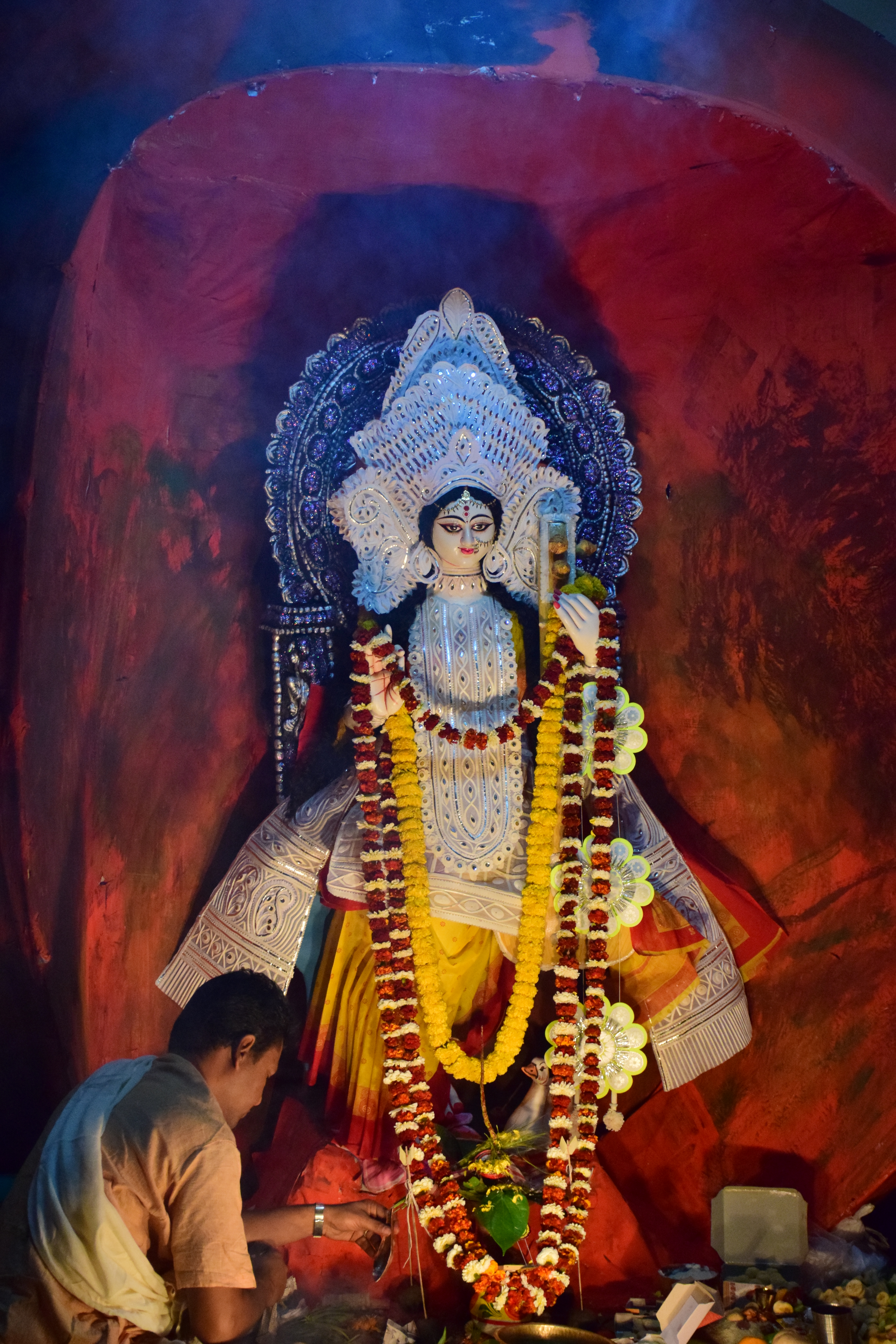
Saraswati Puja

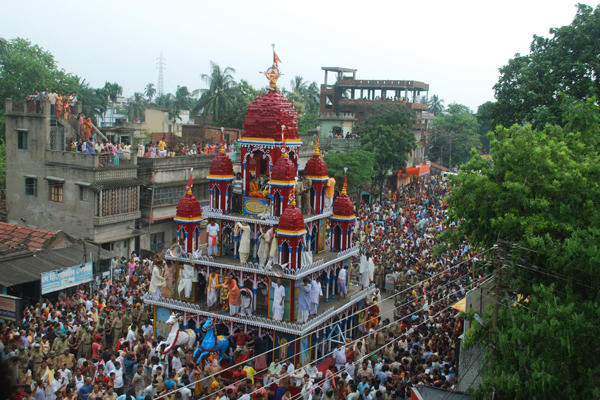
Rath Jatra is widely celebrated in Bengal

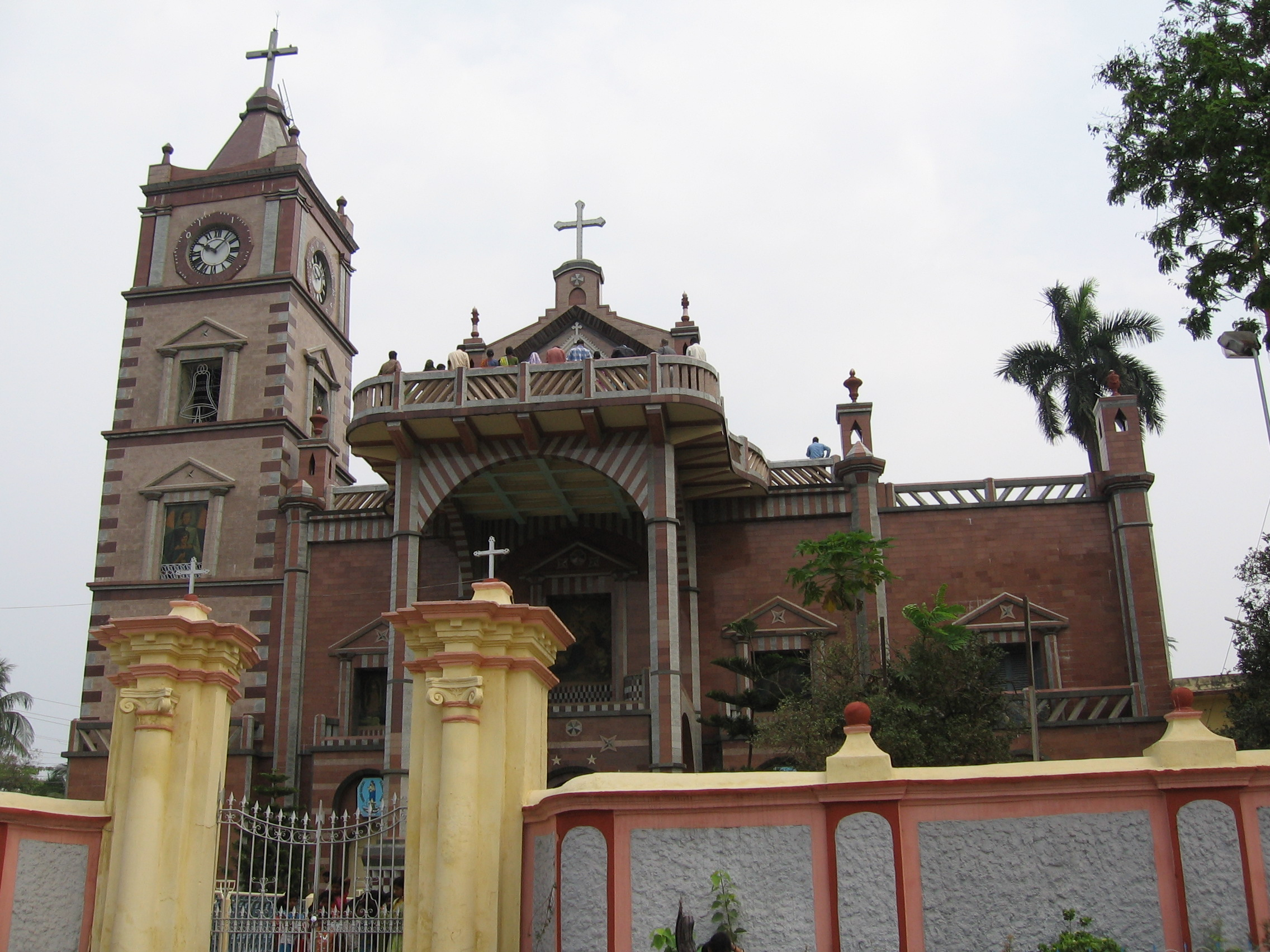
Bandel Church

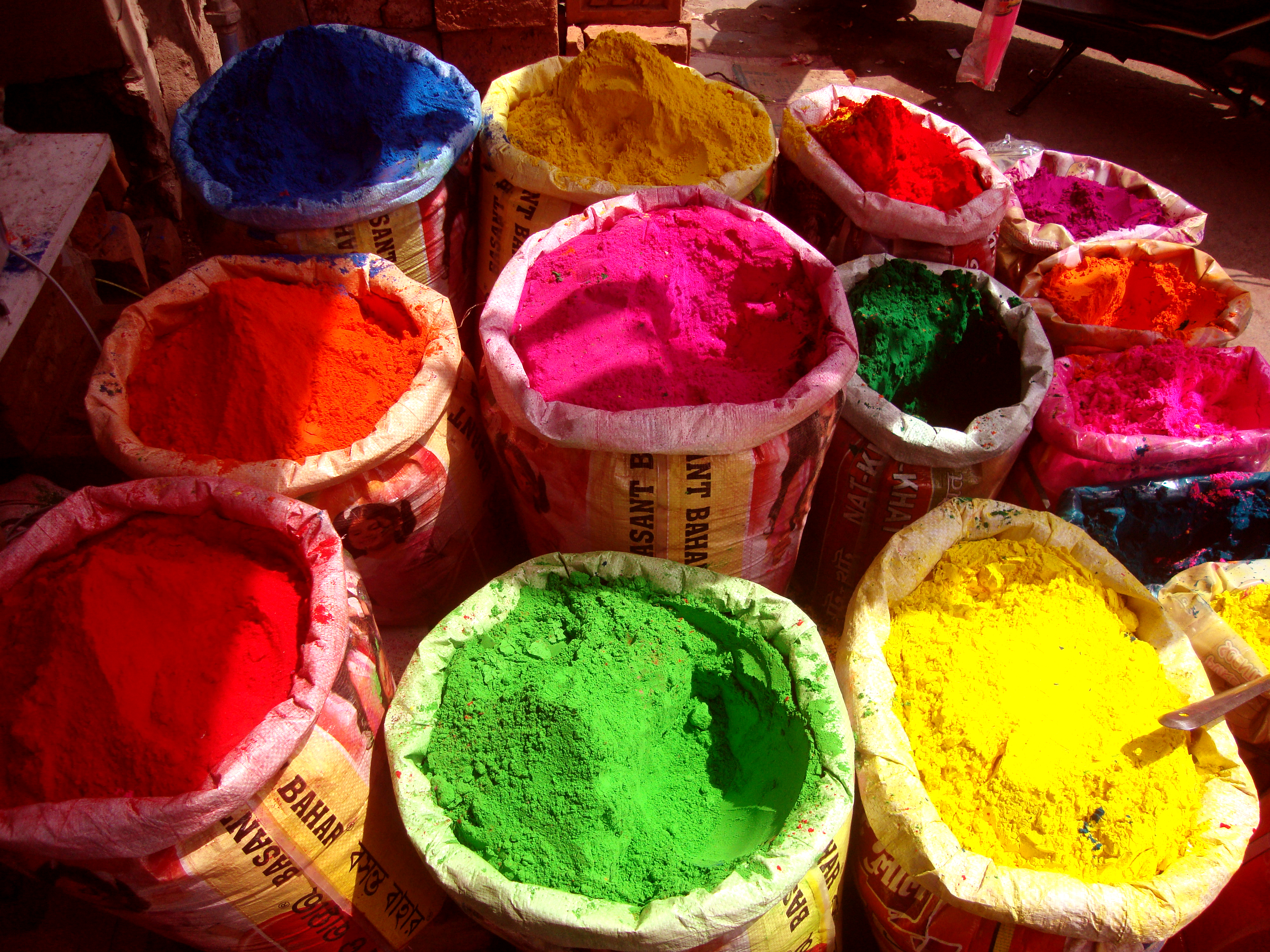
Colours for Dol. Abir on sale at a market

Chhau Mask dance parforming in the field

Muslims gather at Muharram procession in Kolkata

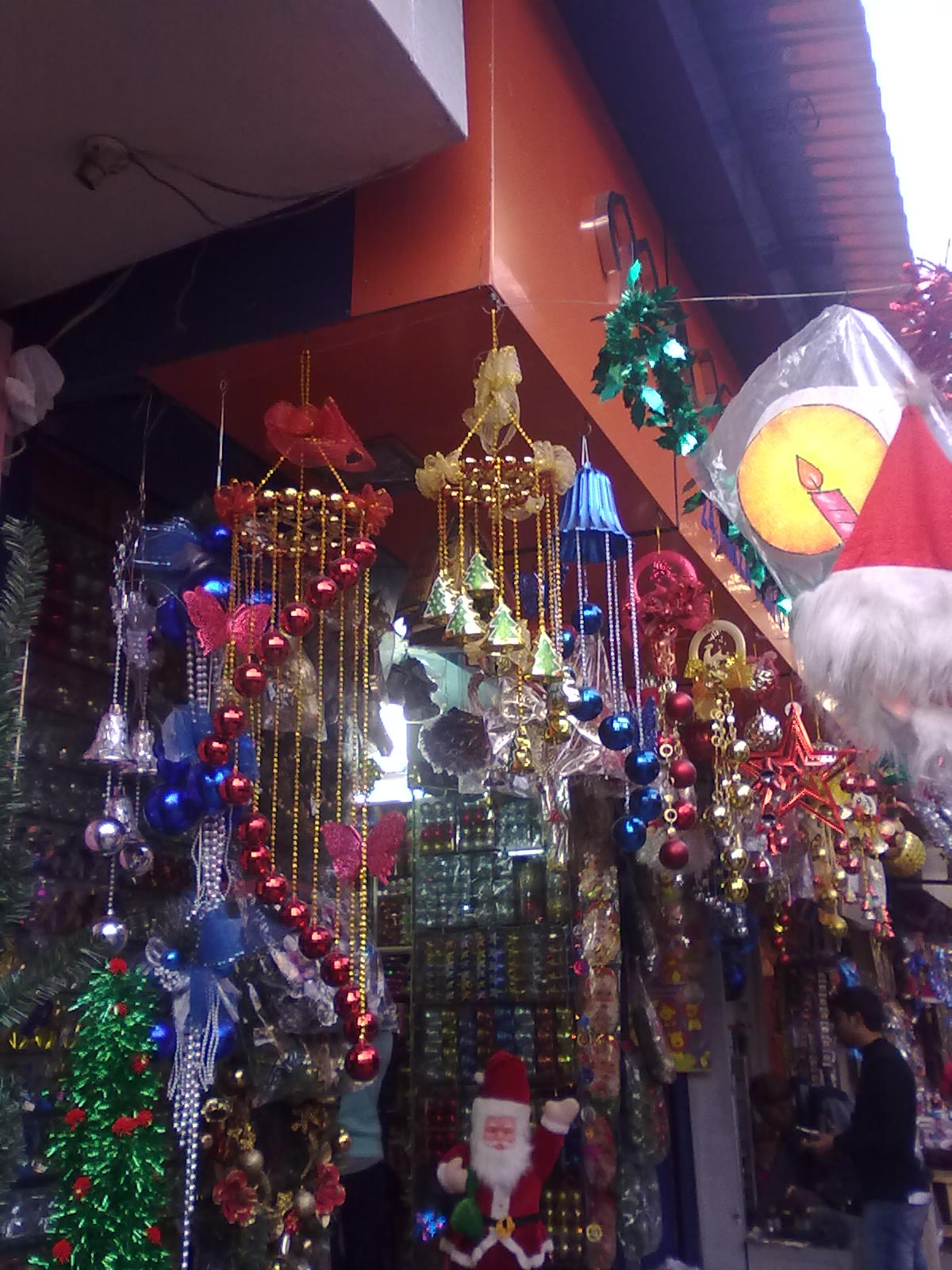
Shops selling Christmas decorations in Kolkata

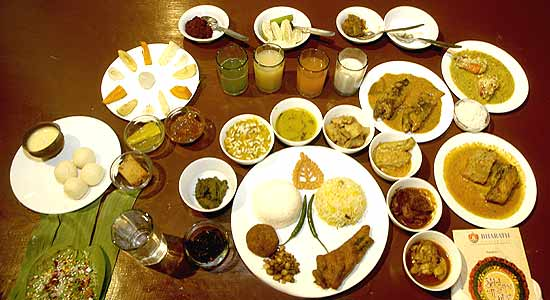
Poila Baisakh festive meal

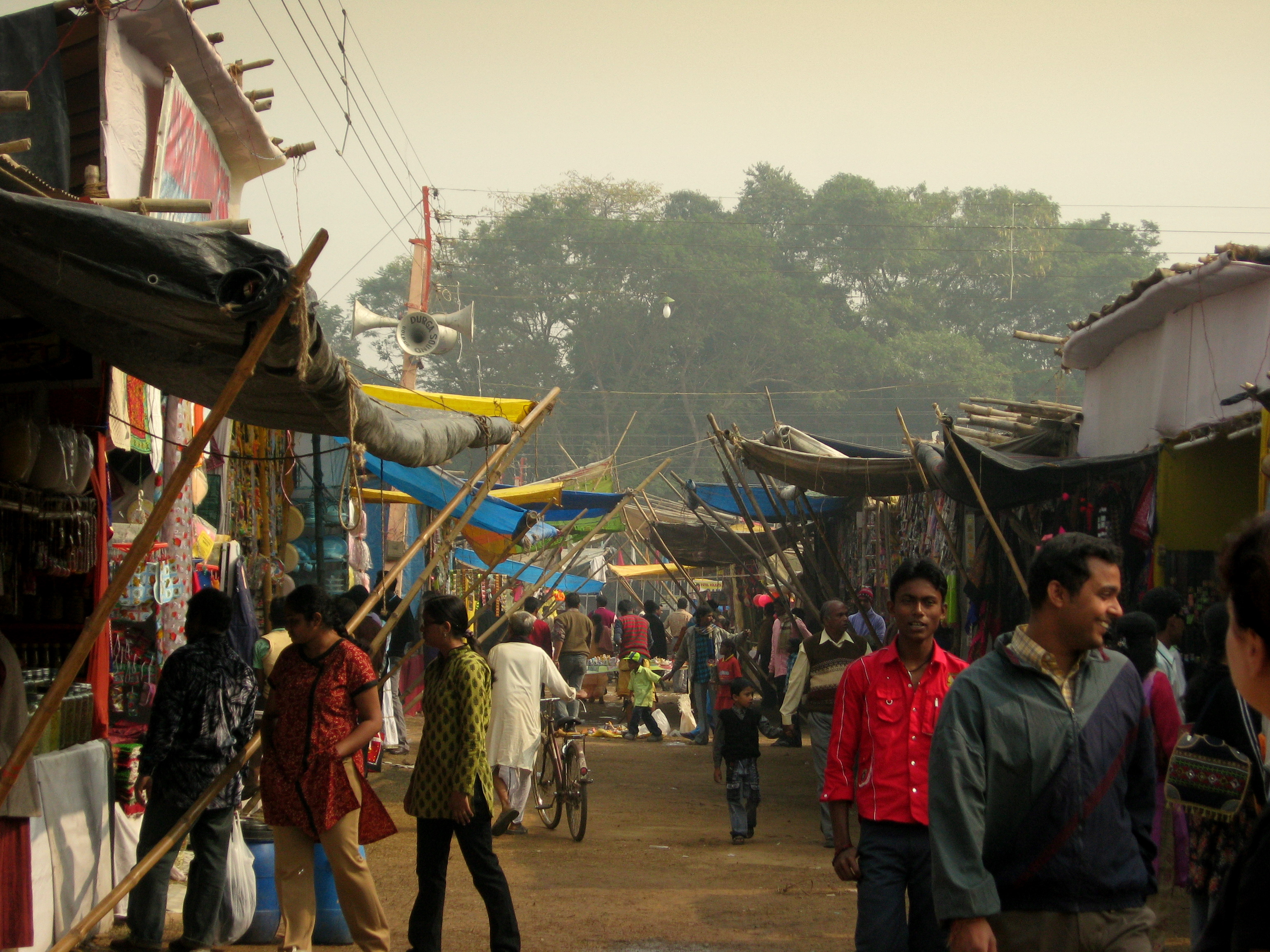
Shoppers at the Poush Mela Fair

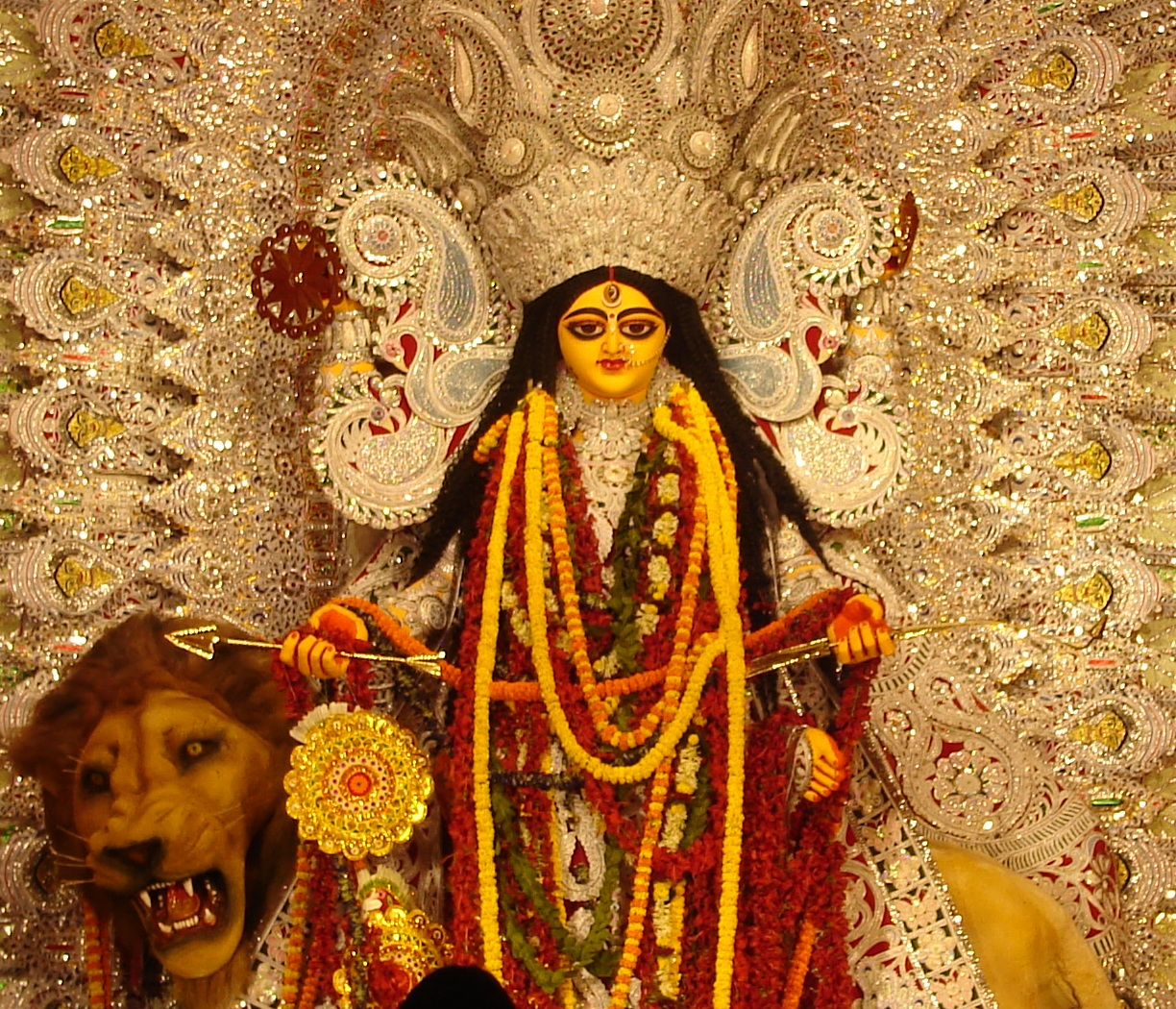
Jagaddhatri Puja in Kolkata

Kapil Muni Temple at Sagardwip

West Bengal has a long tradition of popular literature, music and drama largely based on Bengali folklore and Hindu epics and Puranas.

== See also ==
- Architecture of Bengal
- Arts of West Bengal
- Bengali cuisine
- Bengal School of Art
- Bengali folk literature
- Culture of Bengal
- Culture of Darjeeling
- Culture of India
- Kalighat painting
- Music of Bengal
- Music of West Bengal
- Christianity in West Bengal
