= Lok Bhavan, West Bengal =

Lok Bhavan, West Bengal may refer to:

- Lok Bhavan, Darjeeling, official summer residence of the governor of West Bengal, located in Darjeeling.
- Lok Bhavan, Kolkata, official winter residence of the governor of West Bengal, located in Kolkata.
