= Darjeeling Planters' Club =

Darjeeling Planters' Club is the club of Darjeeling Planters Association, located in the town of Darjeeling, in the Indian state of West Bengal. This association was formed in 1868 under the chairmanship of Mr. S.K. Bhasin, dissolving D.B.I.T.A. (Dooars Branch Indian Tea Association), though the first annual general meeting of the Darjeeling Planters was held in 1873 to consult about problems of the Darjeeling tea estates.

According to Darjeeling Planters Association, "Darjeeling Tea is the World’s most expensive and exotically flavoured tea. Connoisseurs will assert that without Darjeeling, Tea would be like Wine without the prestige of Champagne".
