= Peace Pagoda, Darjeeling =

Buddhist stupa in Darjeeling

Coordinates: 27°01′39″N 88°15′32″E

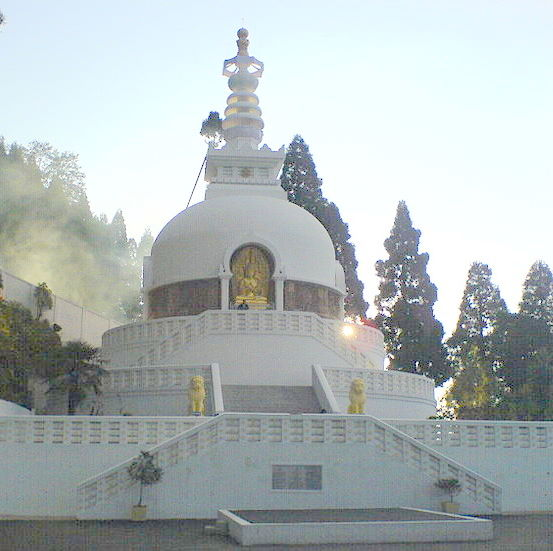
Japanese Peace Pagoda in Darjeeling

Peace Pagoda, Darjeeling or Darjeeling Peace Pagoda is one of the Peace Pagodas designed to provide a focus for people of all races and creeds to help unite them in their search for world peace. It is located in the town of Darjeeling in the Indian state of West Bengal. Like most of the other Peace Pagodas, it was built under the guidance of Nichidatsu Fujii (1885–1985), a Buddhist monk from Japan and founder of the Nipponzan-Myōhōji Buddhist Order.

The foundation stone of the pagoda was laid on 3 November 1972 by Nichidatsu Fujii, and was inaugurated on 1 November 1992. The pagoda was designed by M. Ohka, and it took 36 months to construct. It houses the four avatars of Buddha including Maitreya Buddha. The height of the pagoda is 28.5 metres (94 ft) and diameter is 23 metres (75 ft).The Pagoda is situated on the slopes of the Jalapahar hills, in the town of Darjeeling.

== Gallery ==
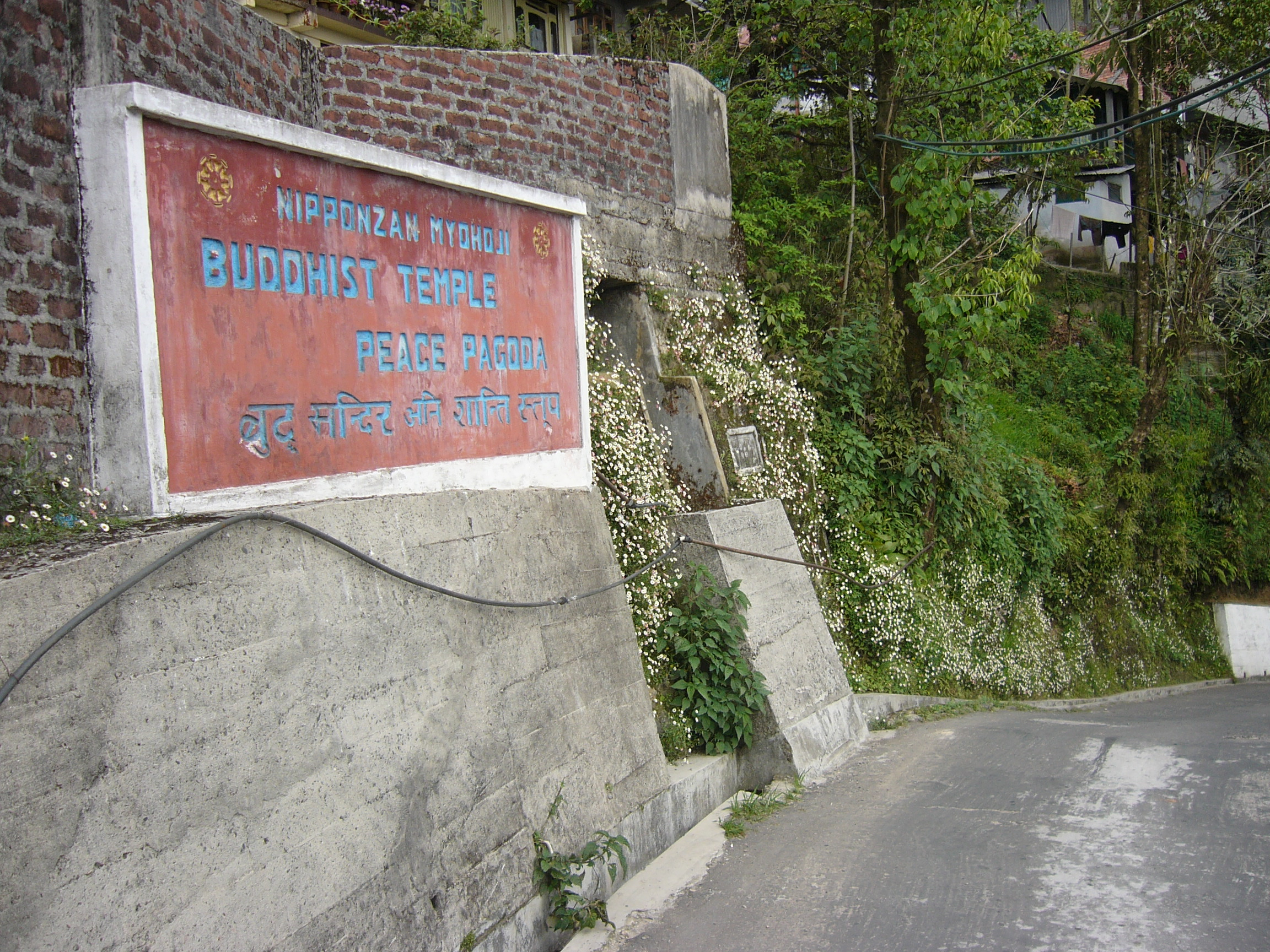

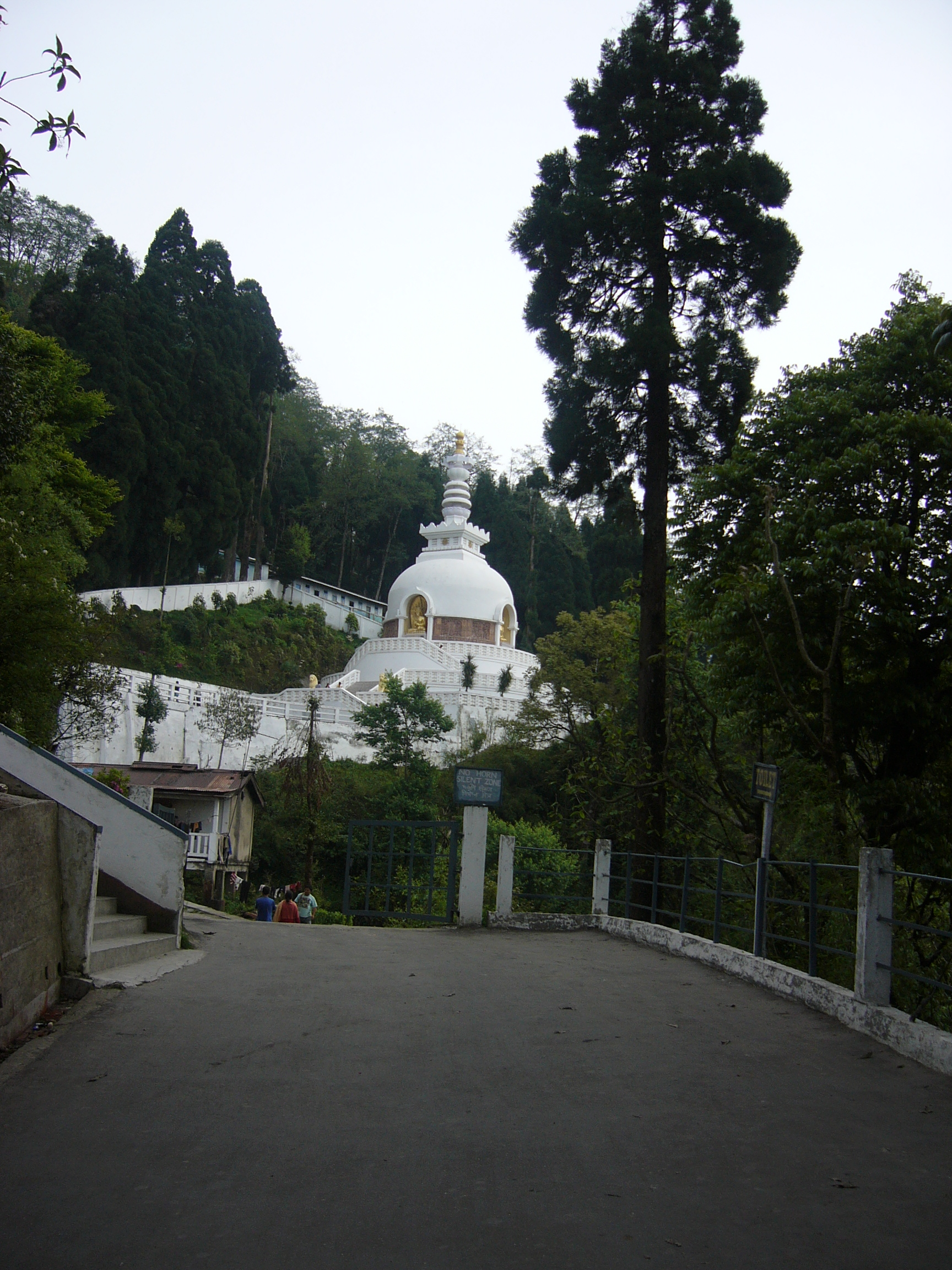

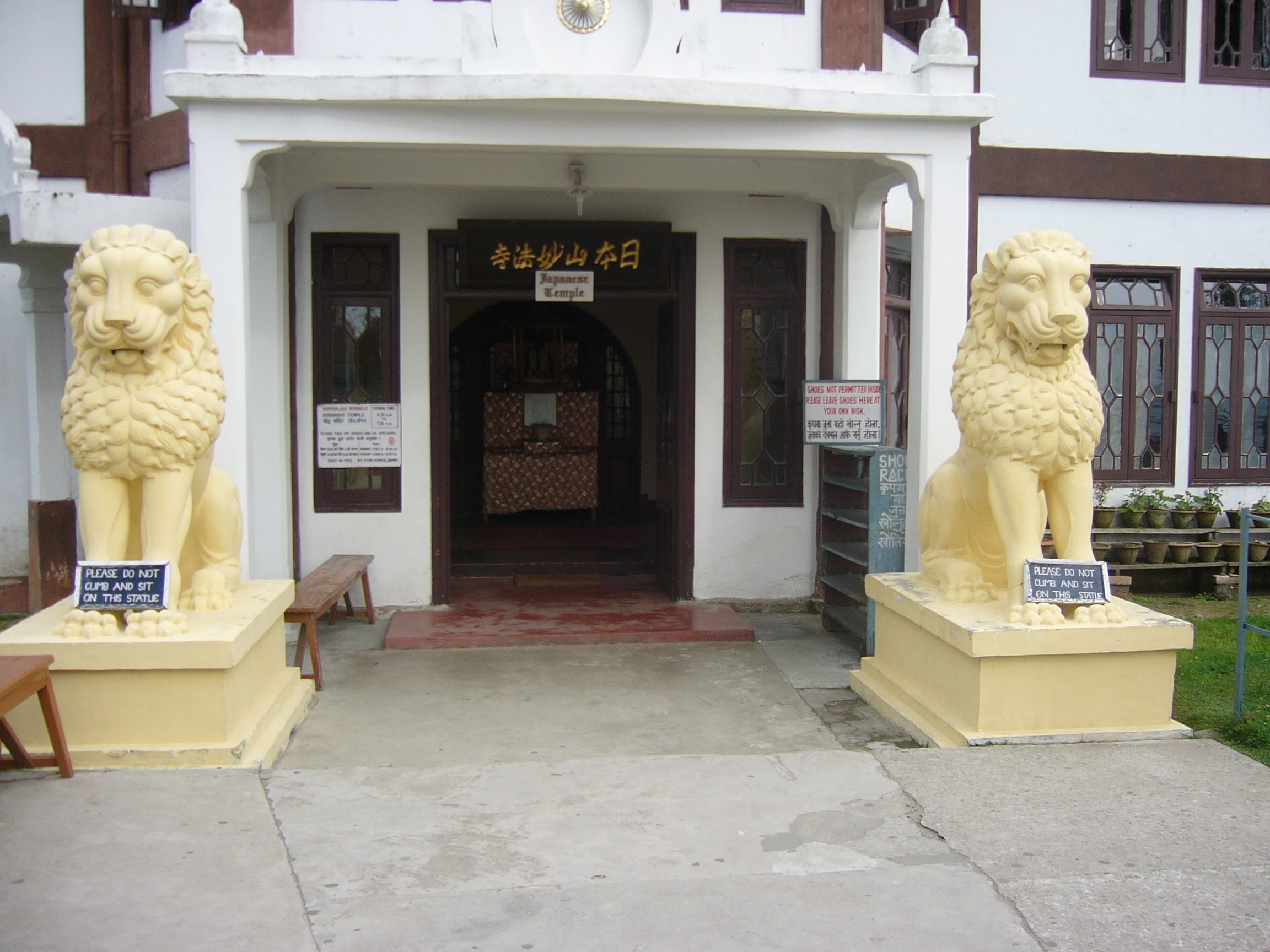
Buddhist Temple

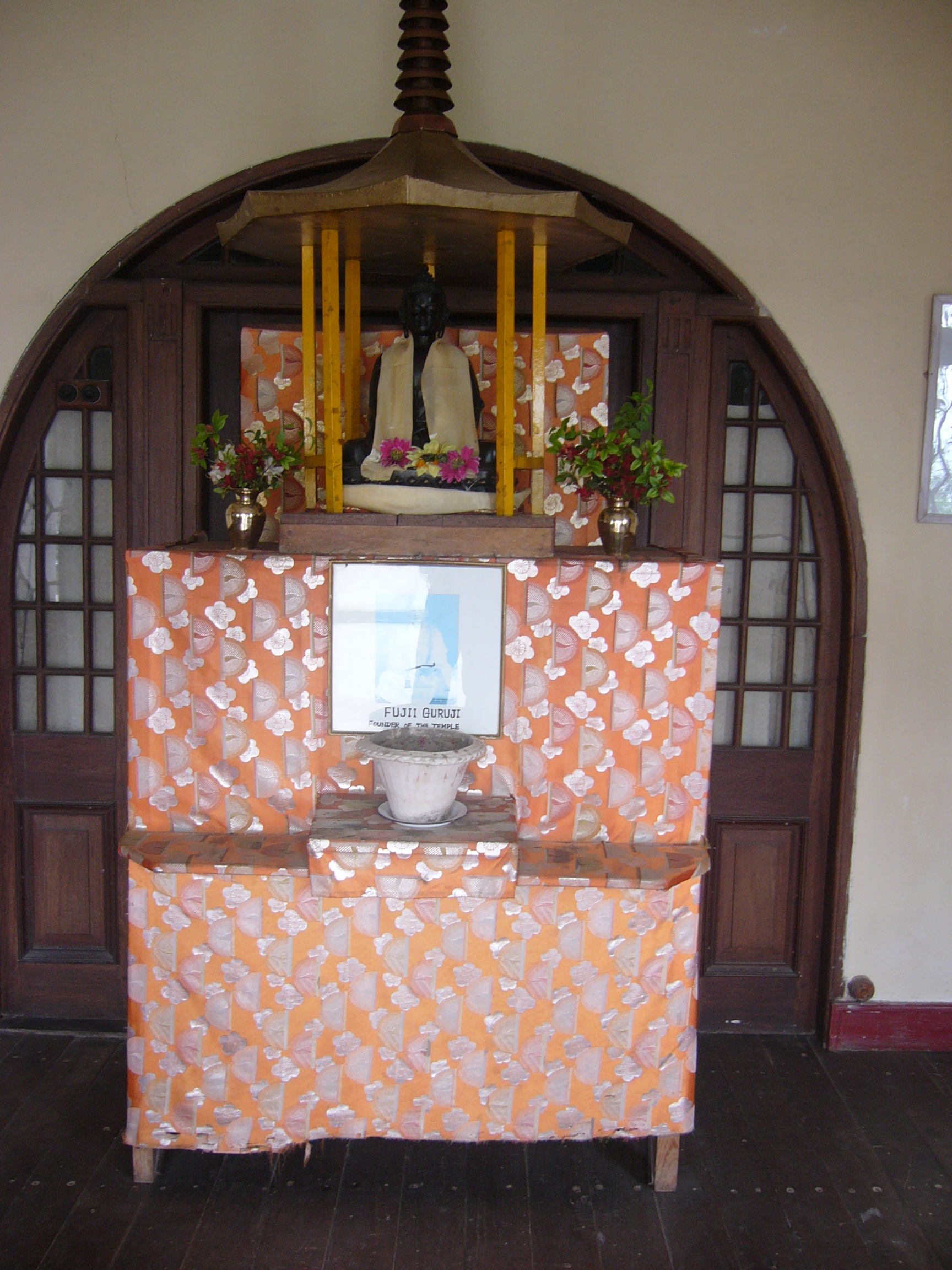
Buddhist Temple

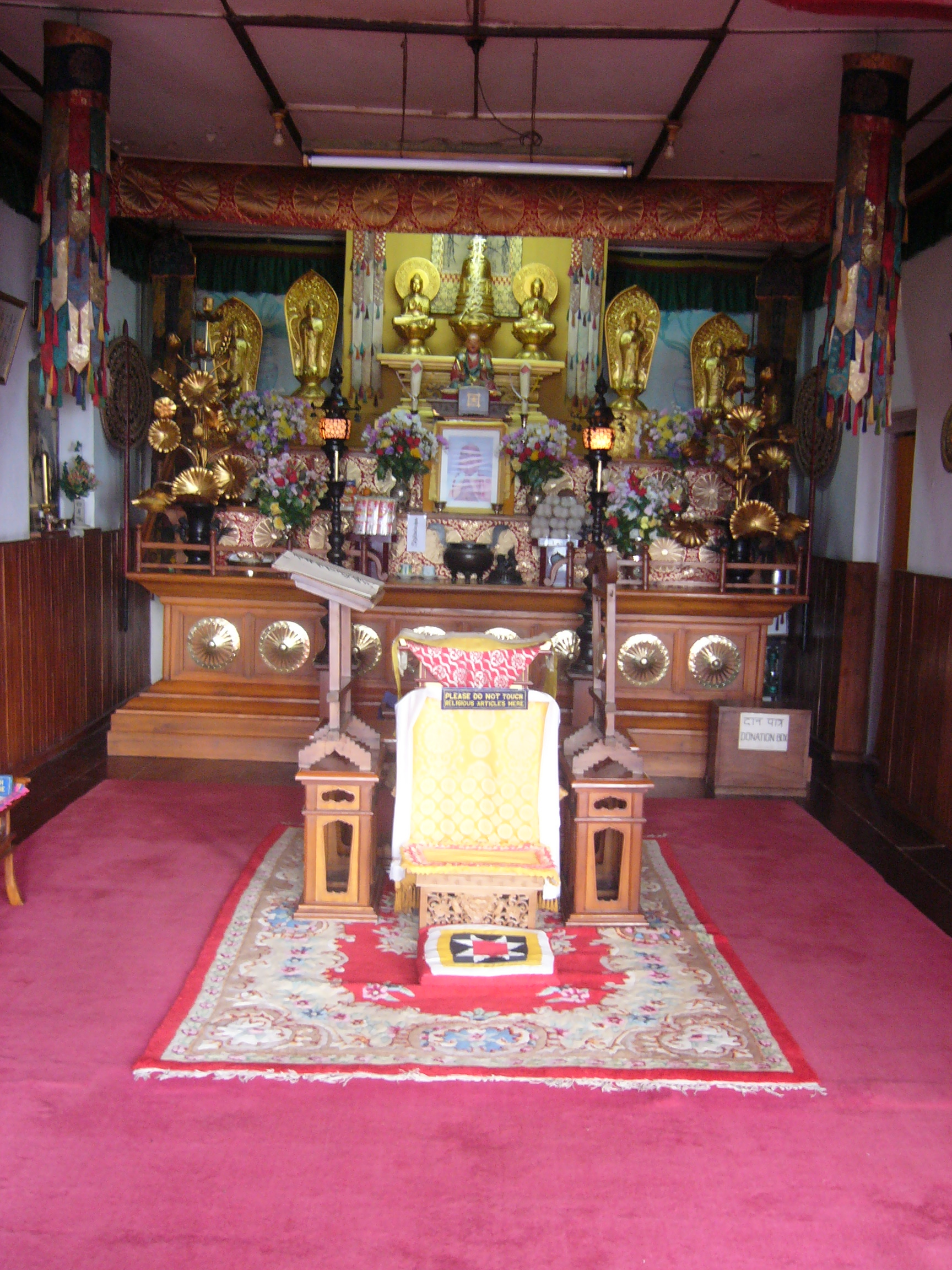
Buddhist Temple

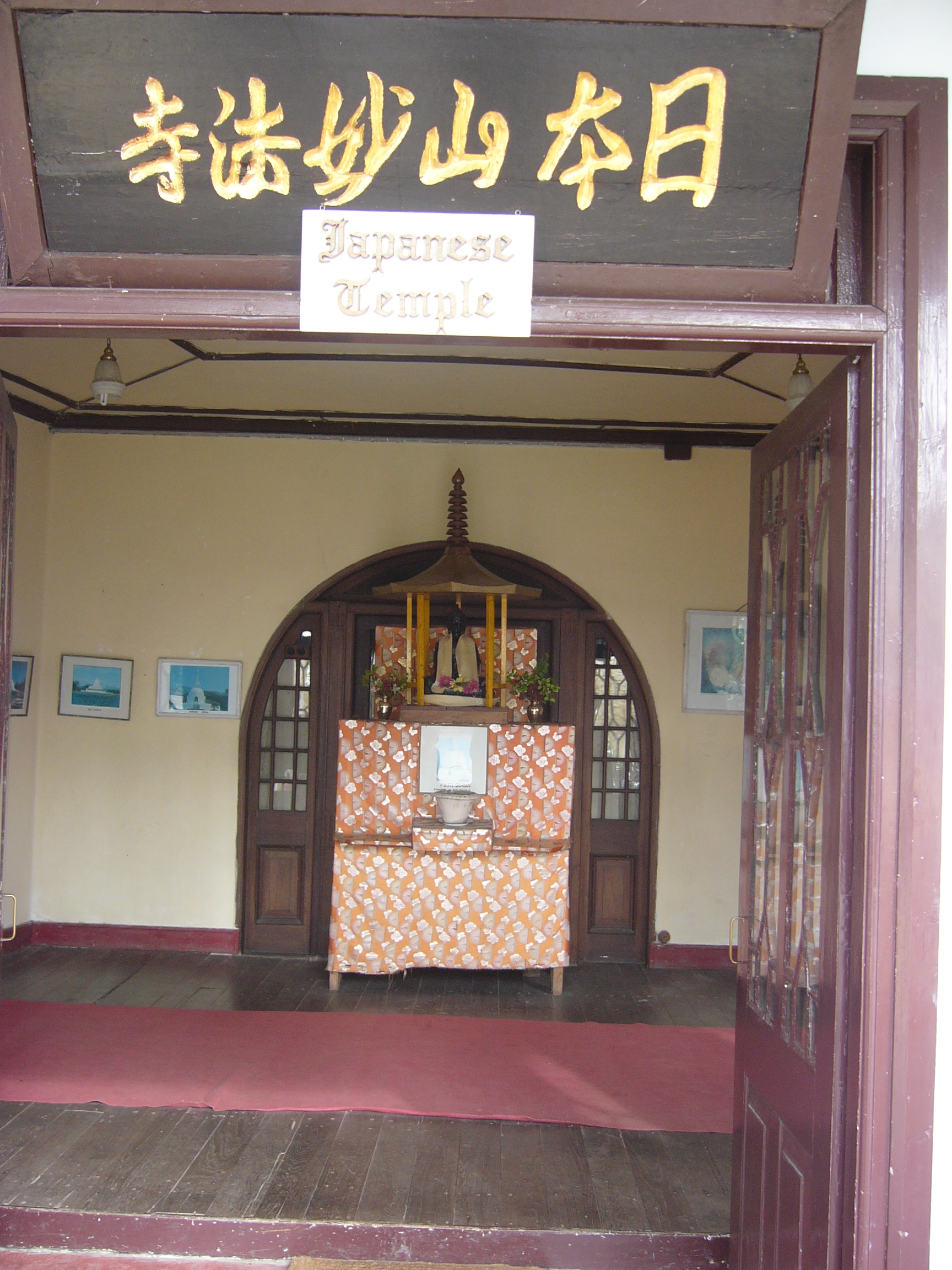
Buddhist Temple

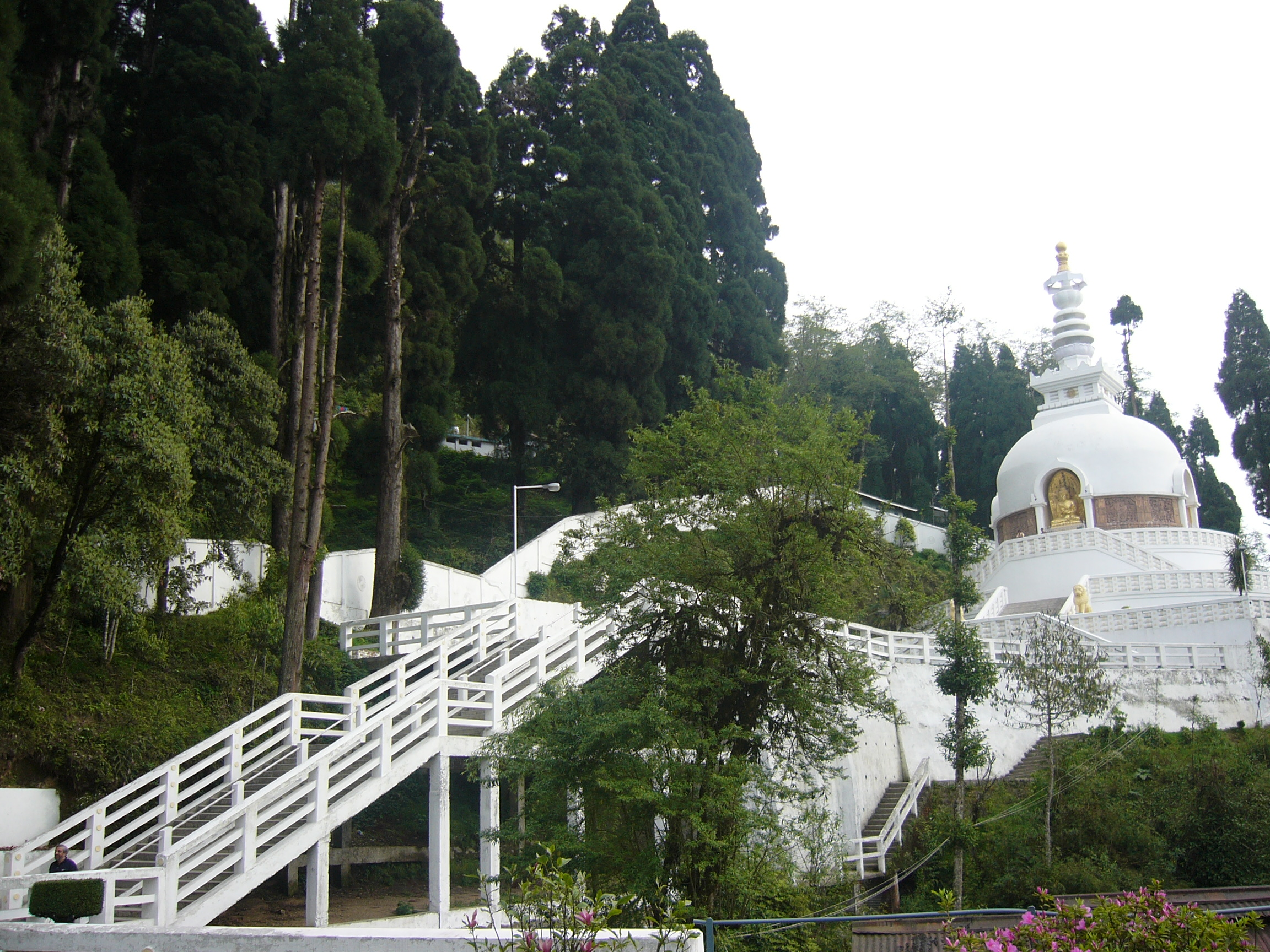
Peace Pagoda

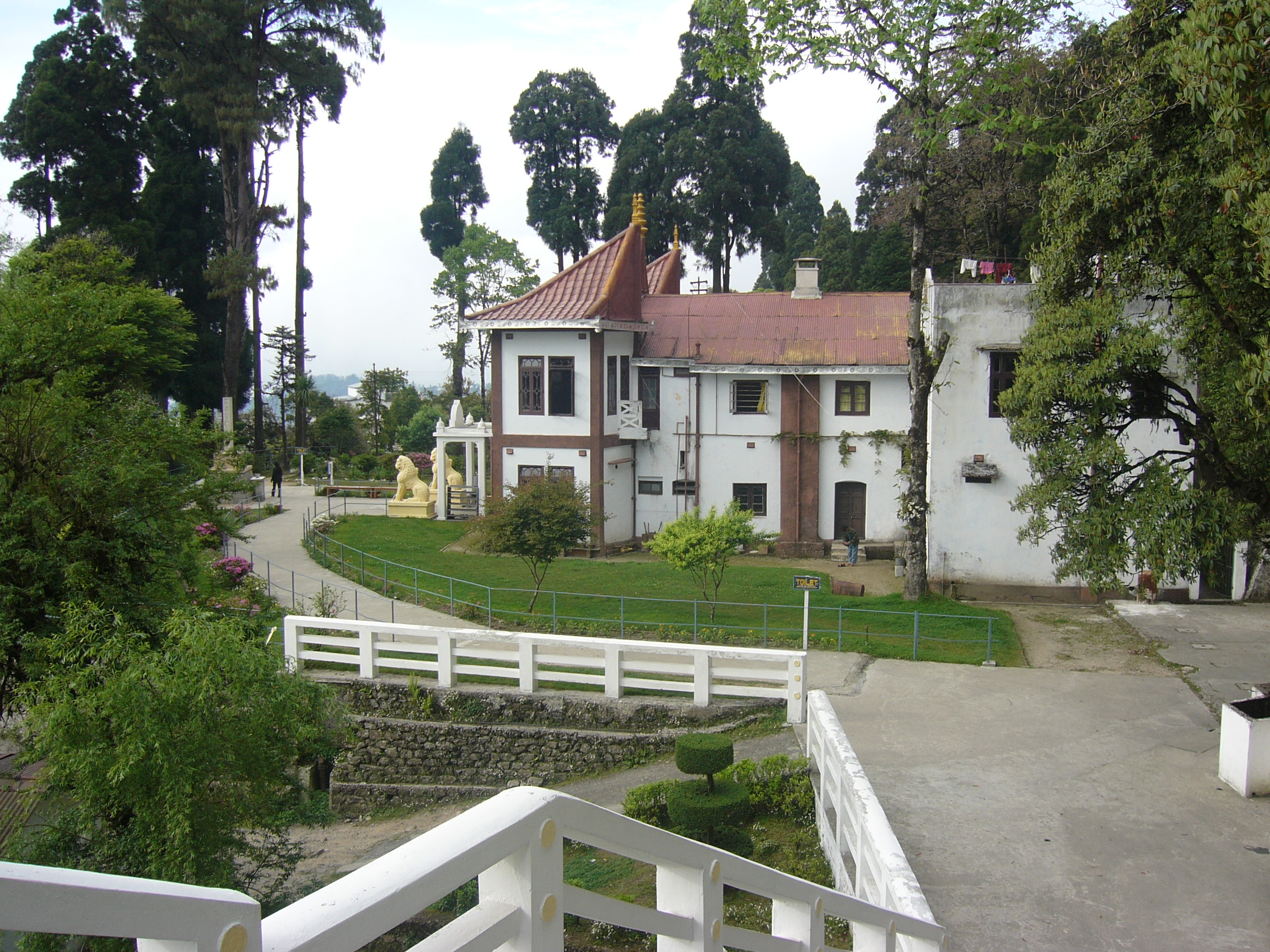
Buddhist Temple

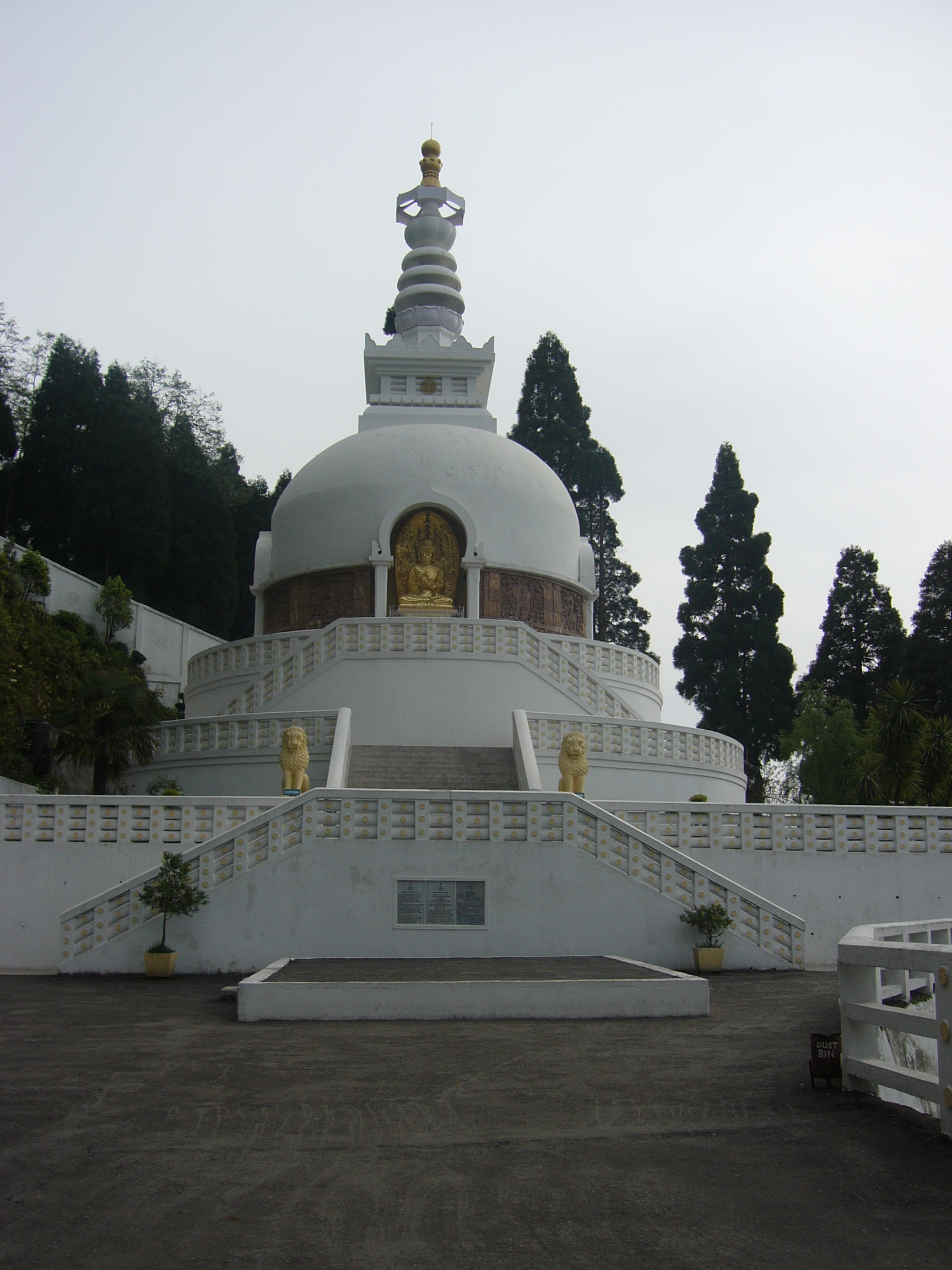
Peace Pagoda

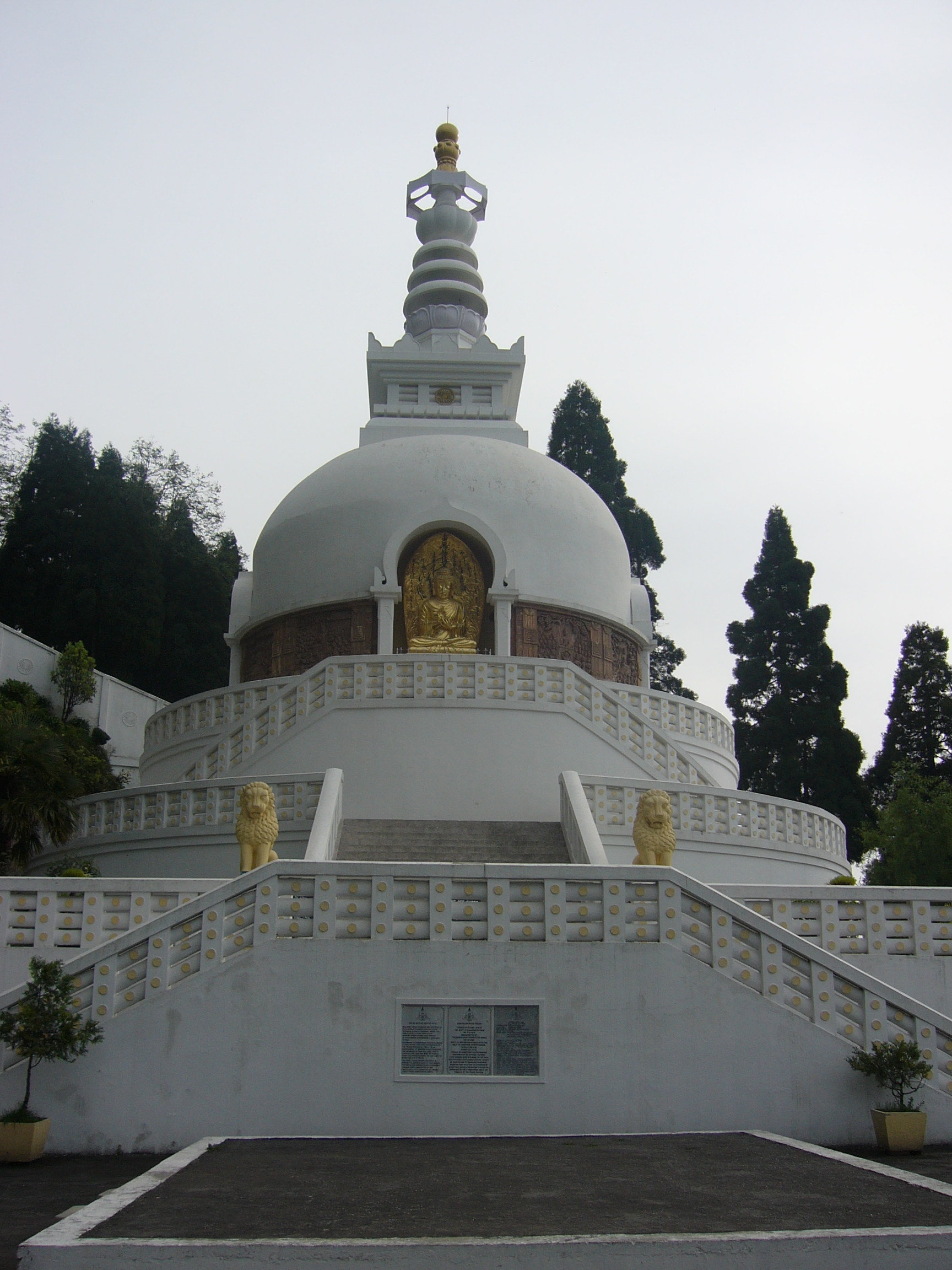
Peace Pagoda

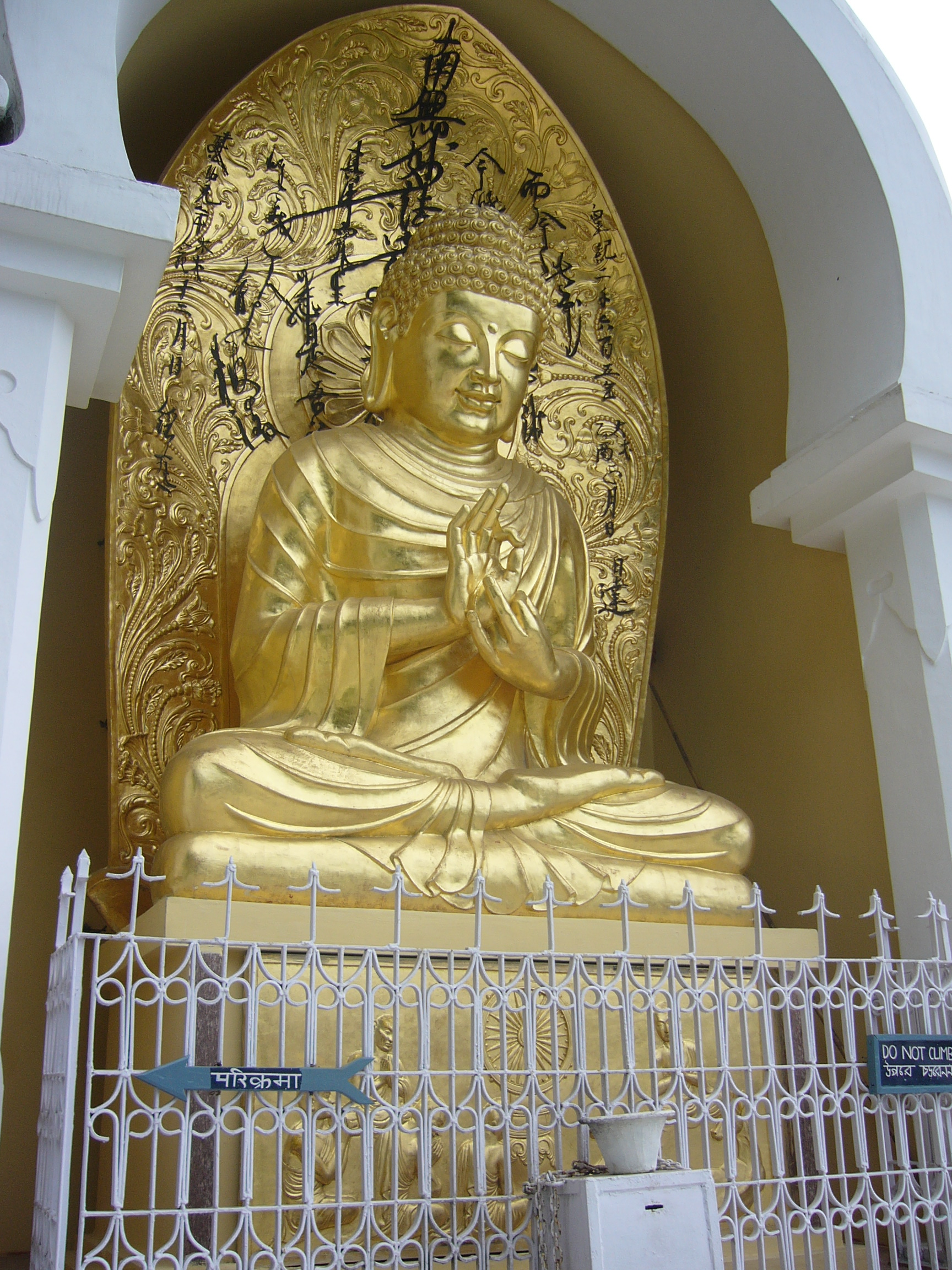
Peace Pagoda

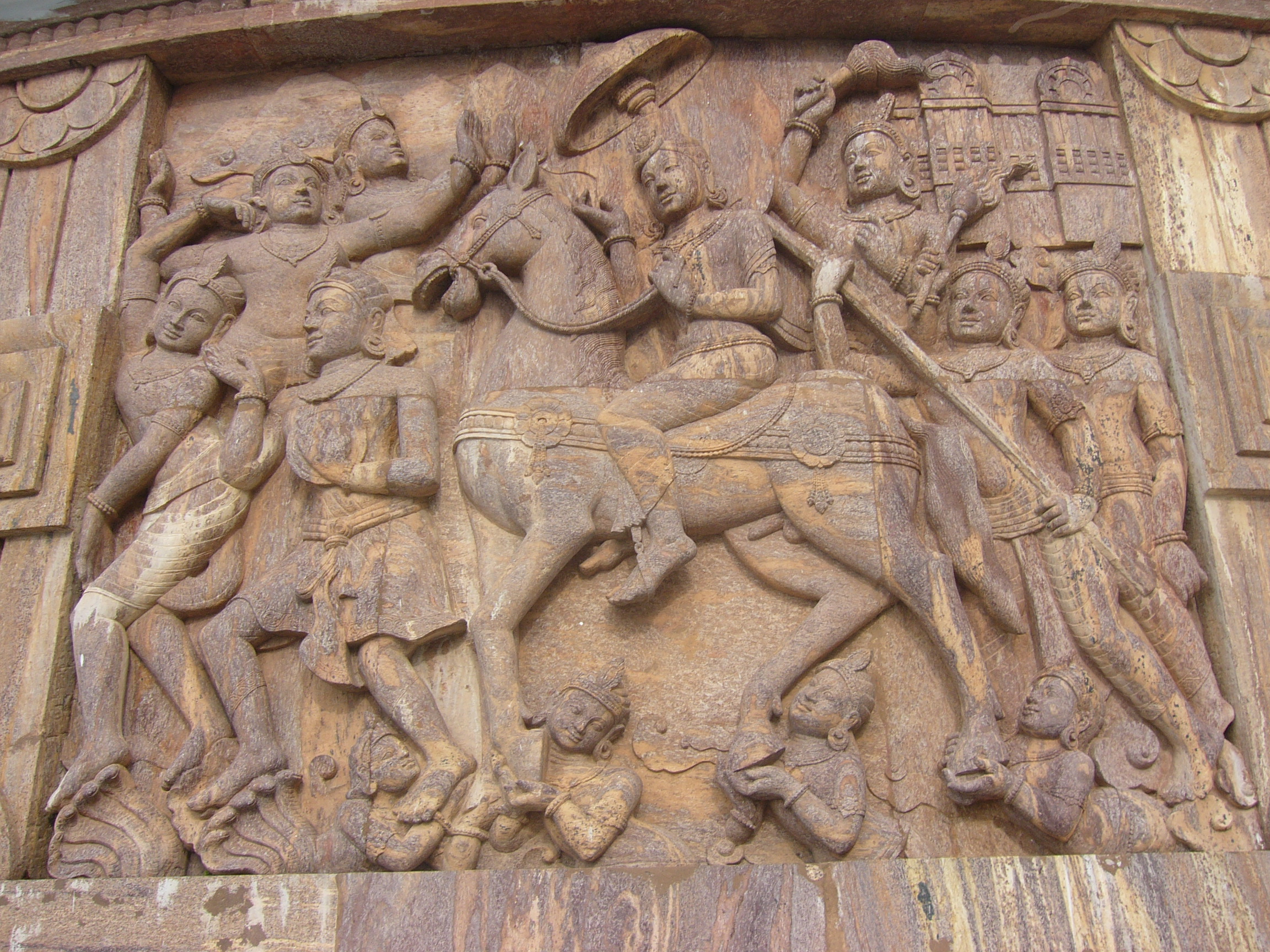
Peace Pagoda

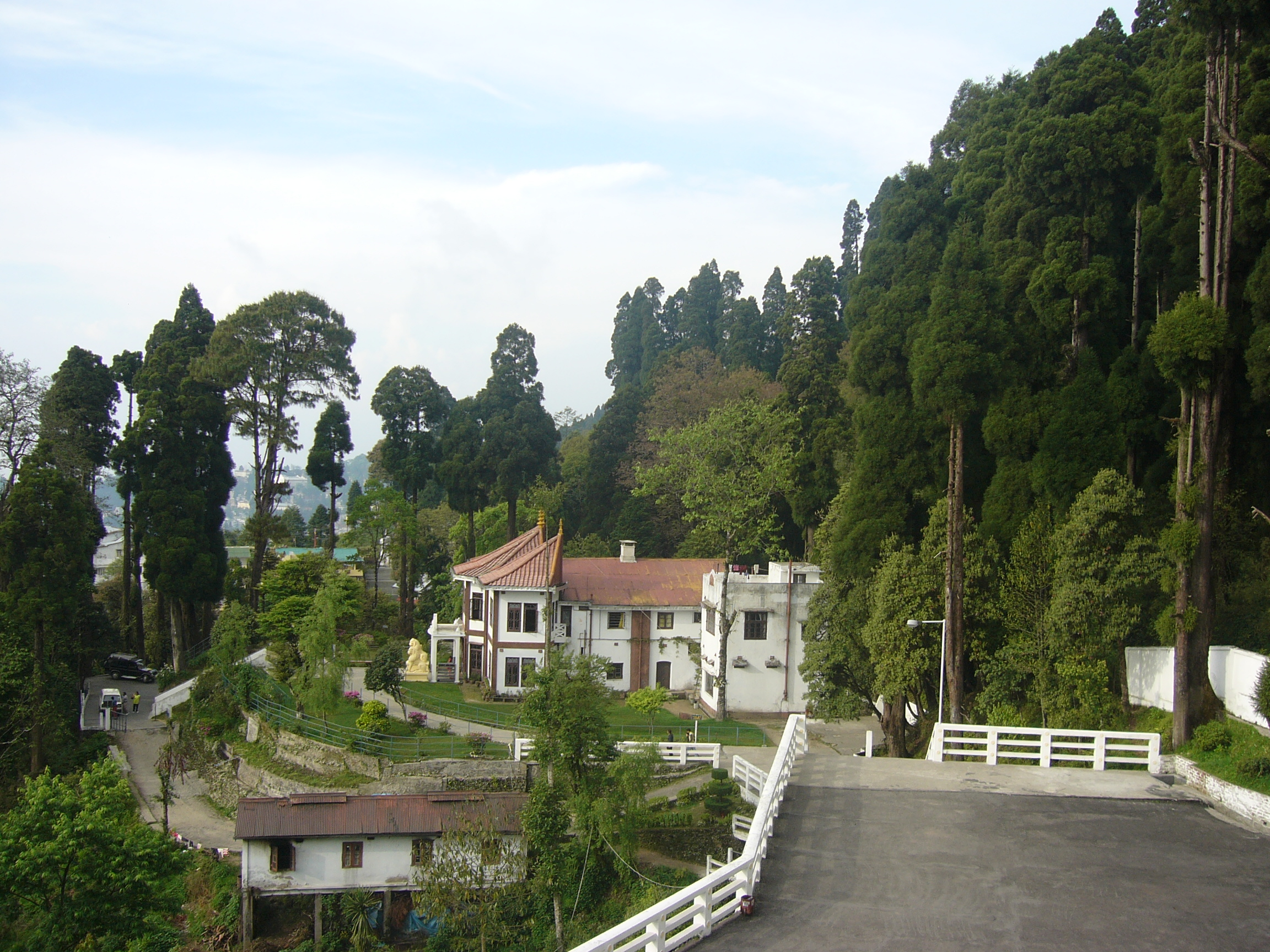

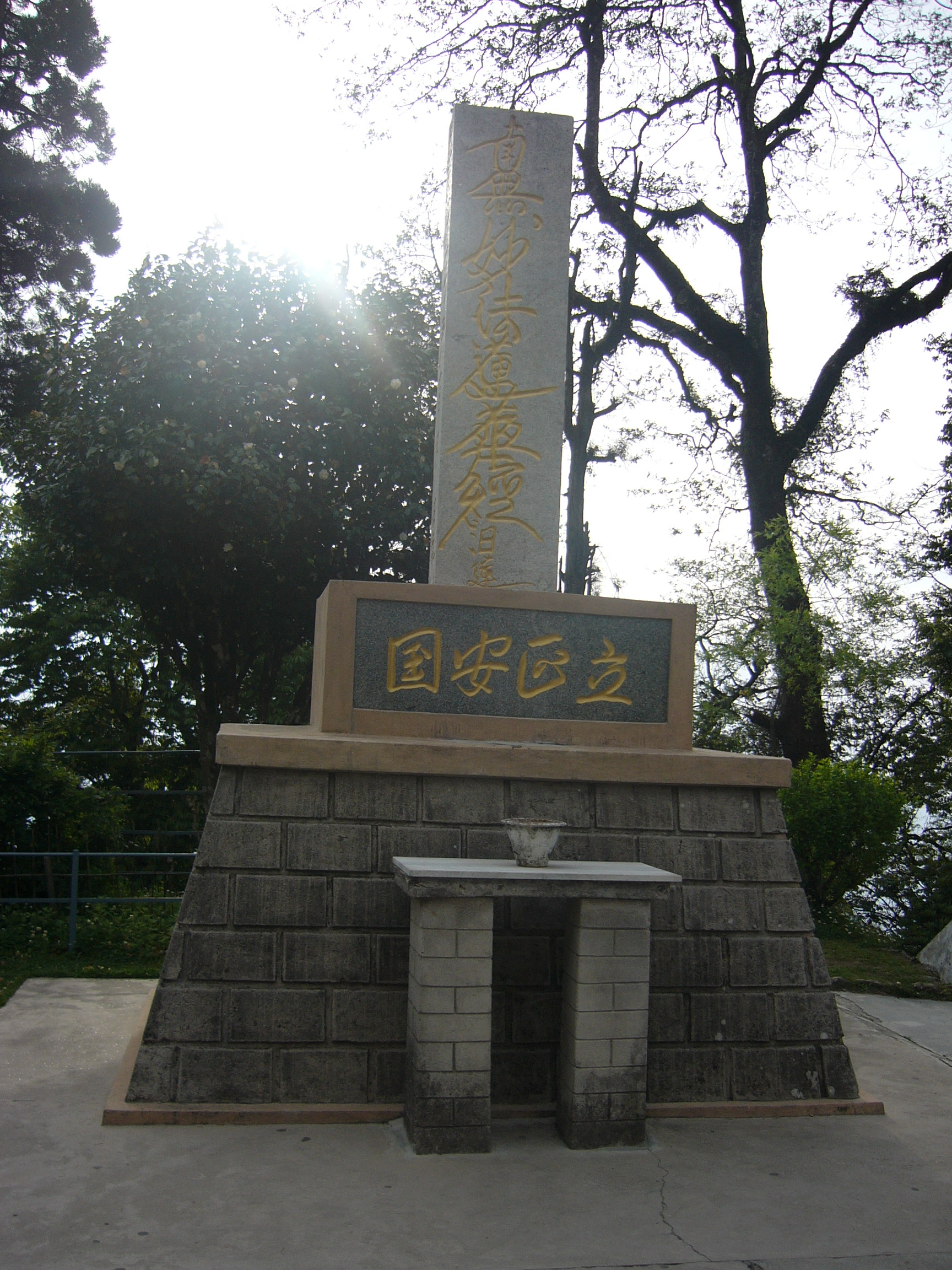

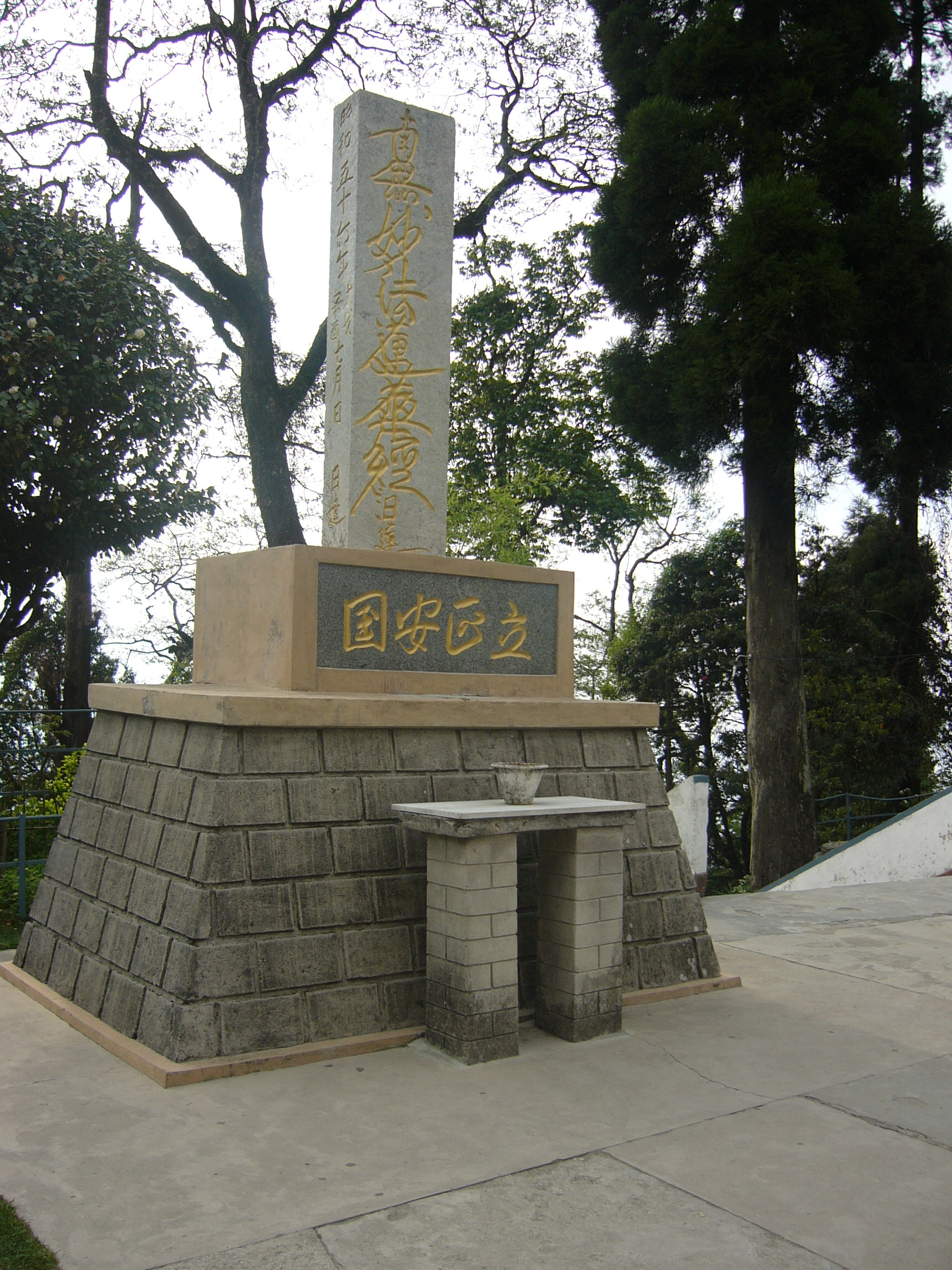

== See also ==
- Chowrasta
