= Chotrul Duchen =

Buddhist festival

- Chotrul Düchen

Tibetan name
- Tibetan: ཆོ་འཕྲུལ་དུས་ཆེན་
Transcriptions
- Wylie: cho-'phrul dus-chen

- Chonga Choepa

Tibetan name
- Tibetan: བཅོ་ལྔ་མཆོད་པ་
Transcriptions
- Wylie: bco-lnga mchod-pa

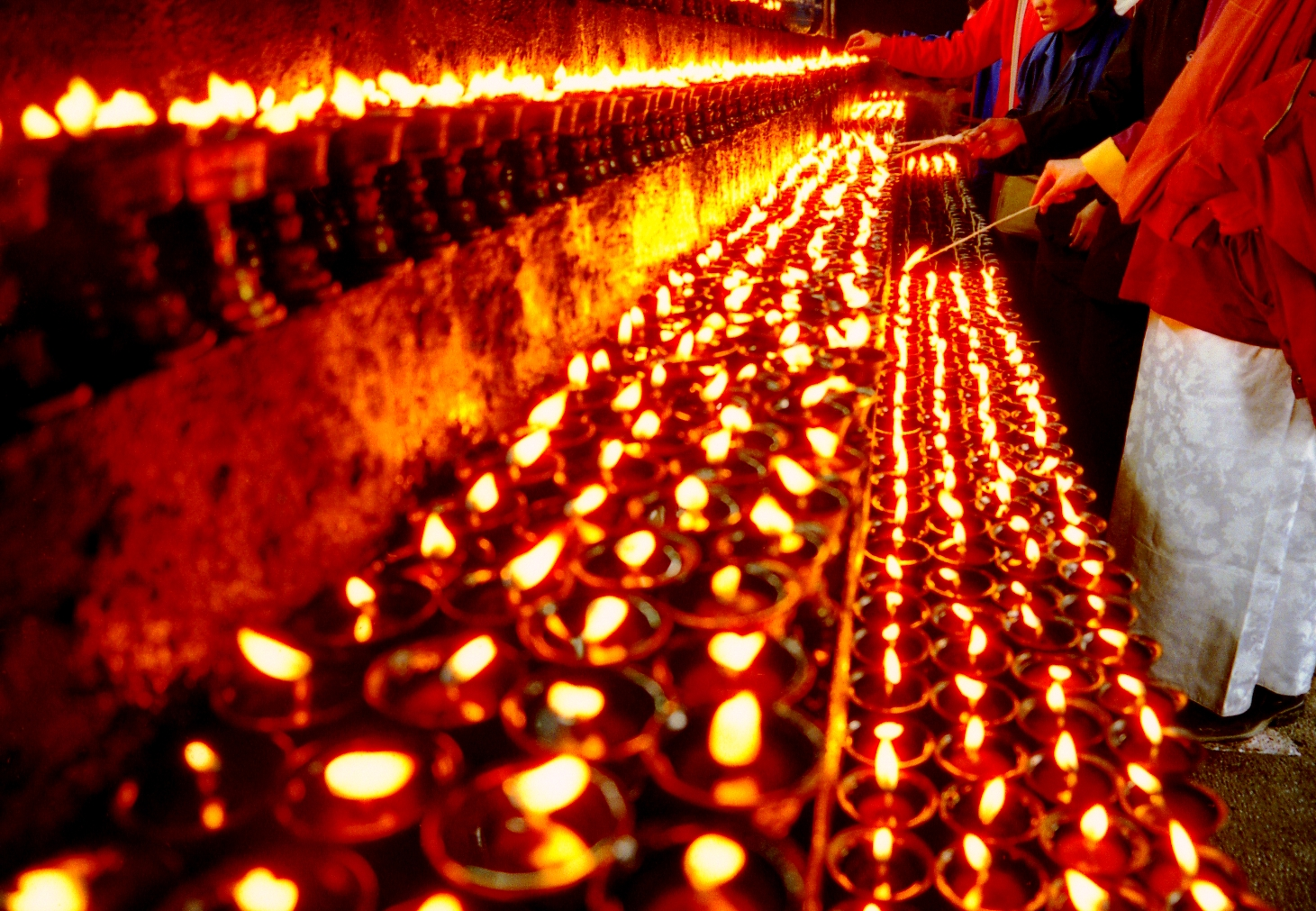
Butter lamps being lit at a temple

Chotrul Düchen, (Eng. Miracle Manifestation Great Day; also known as Chonga Chöpa or the Butter Lamp Festival), is one of the four Tibetan Buddhist festivals commemorating four events in the life of the Buddha. Chotrul Düchen occurs on the first full moon (Bumgyur Dawa) of the fifteenth day after Losar, the New Year in the lunar Tibetan calendar. The preceding fifteen days are called the Miracle Month that celebrates miracles the Buddha displayed in Sravasti for his disciples and guests so as to increase their devotion. During Chötrul Düchen it is believed that the effects of both positive and negative actions are multiplied ten million times.

To commemorate the occasion, Tibetan Buddhists make lamps, traditionally of colored yak butter but now usually of vegetable ghee called butter lamps, in the shapes of deities, lamas, garudas, flowers, and other auspicious symbols. They also create elaborate displays for the lamps in their homes and in public spaces, sometimes erecting structures as large as a building. All the lanterns are lit in celebration on the fifteenth day of the month.
