= Lok Bhavan, Darjeeling =

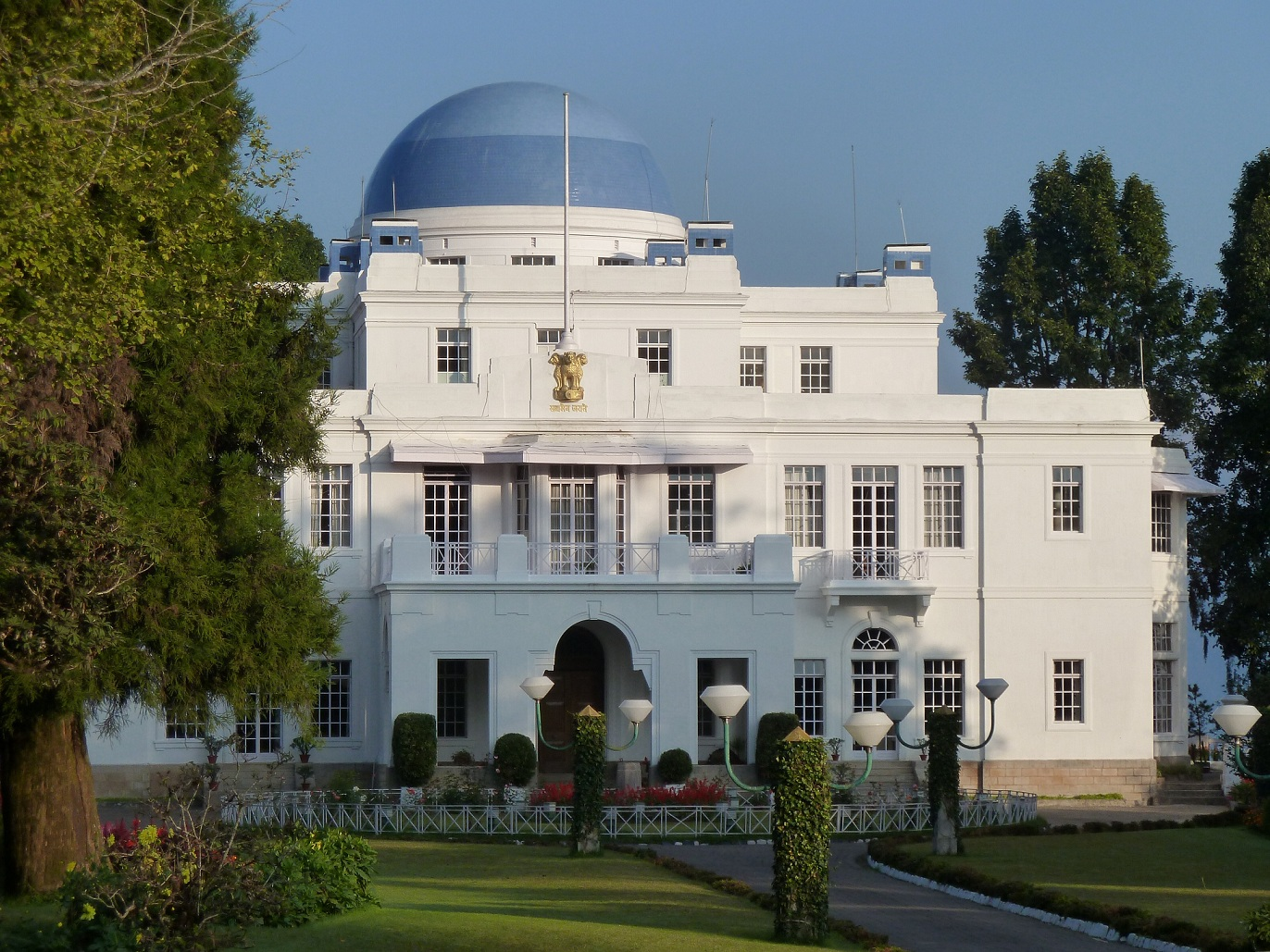
- Front façade of the Raj Bhavan
- Interactive map of the Lok Bhavan, Darjeeling area

General information
- Type: Summer residence
- Coordinates: 27.051444°N 88.263474°E
- Current tenants: R. N. Ravi
- Construction started: 1877
- Completed: 1879
- Owner: Government of West Bengal

References
- Raj Bhavan, Darjeeling

Lok Bhavan translation: Government House), formerly Raj Bhavan (Translation: Government House) at Darjeeling is the summer residence for the Governor of West Bengal. It is located in the city of Darjeeling, West Bengal. Current Tenant is R. N. Ravi.

== History ==
Raj Bhavan used to be the Governor's House during the British era. It was served as the summer residence of the Governors of Bengal. The permanent residence of the Governor was at the Belvedere Estate in Calcutta. However, during the hot summer time, the Governor used to shift his residence to Darjeeling, along with the whole office.

The Governor's House building was purchased in 1877 from the Maharaja of Cooch-Behar.

Even now, the Governor of West Bengal spends two weeks every summer at the Raj Bhavan in Darjeeling.

== Picture Gallery ==
=== Present photos ===
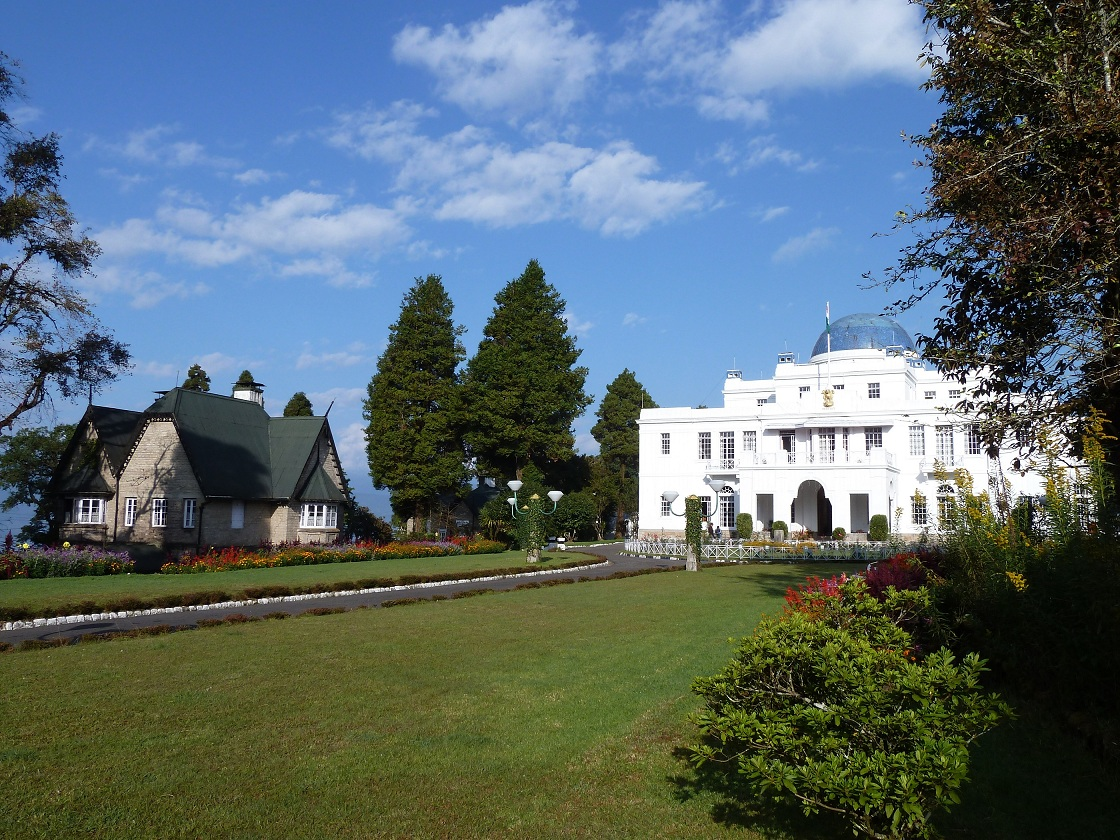
Raj Bhavan from outside

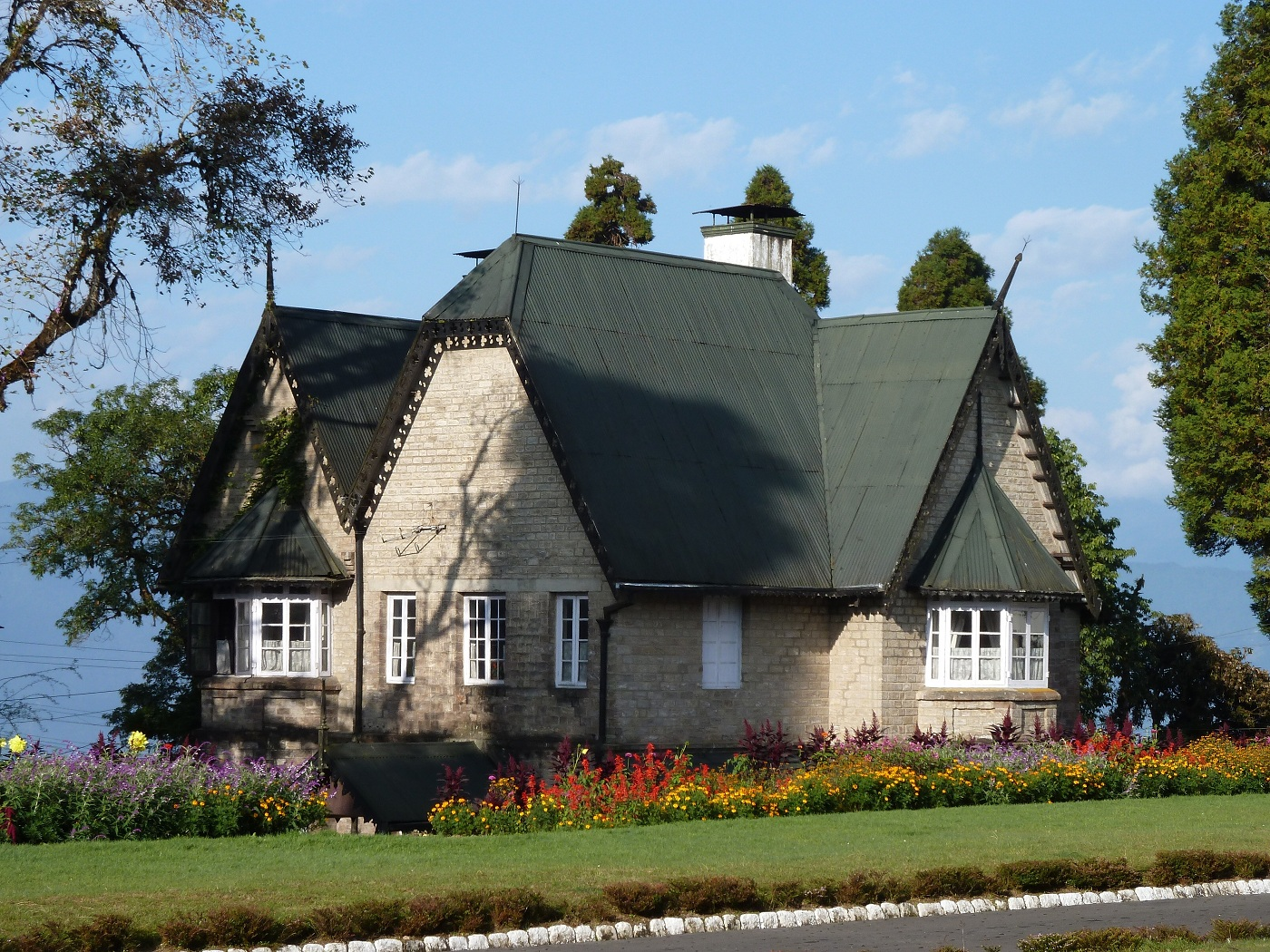
Raj Bhavan Cottage

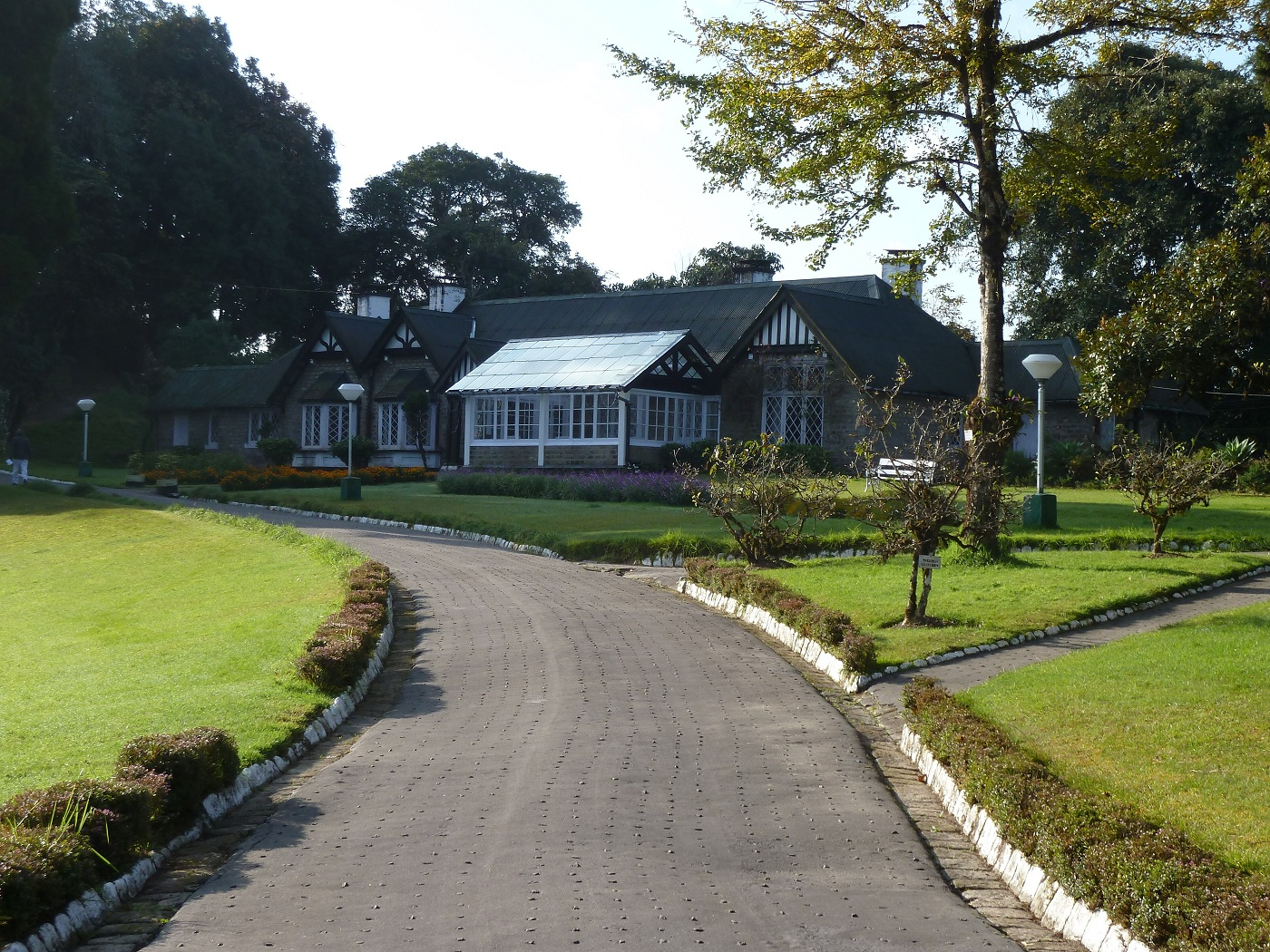
Raj Bhavan Villa Side
