= Tendong Lho Rumfaat =

Festival of the Lepcha people

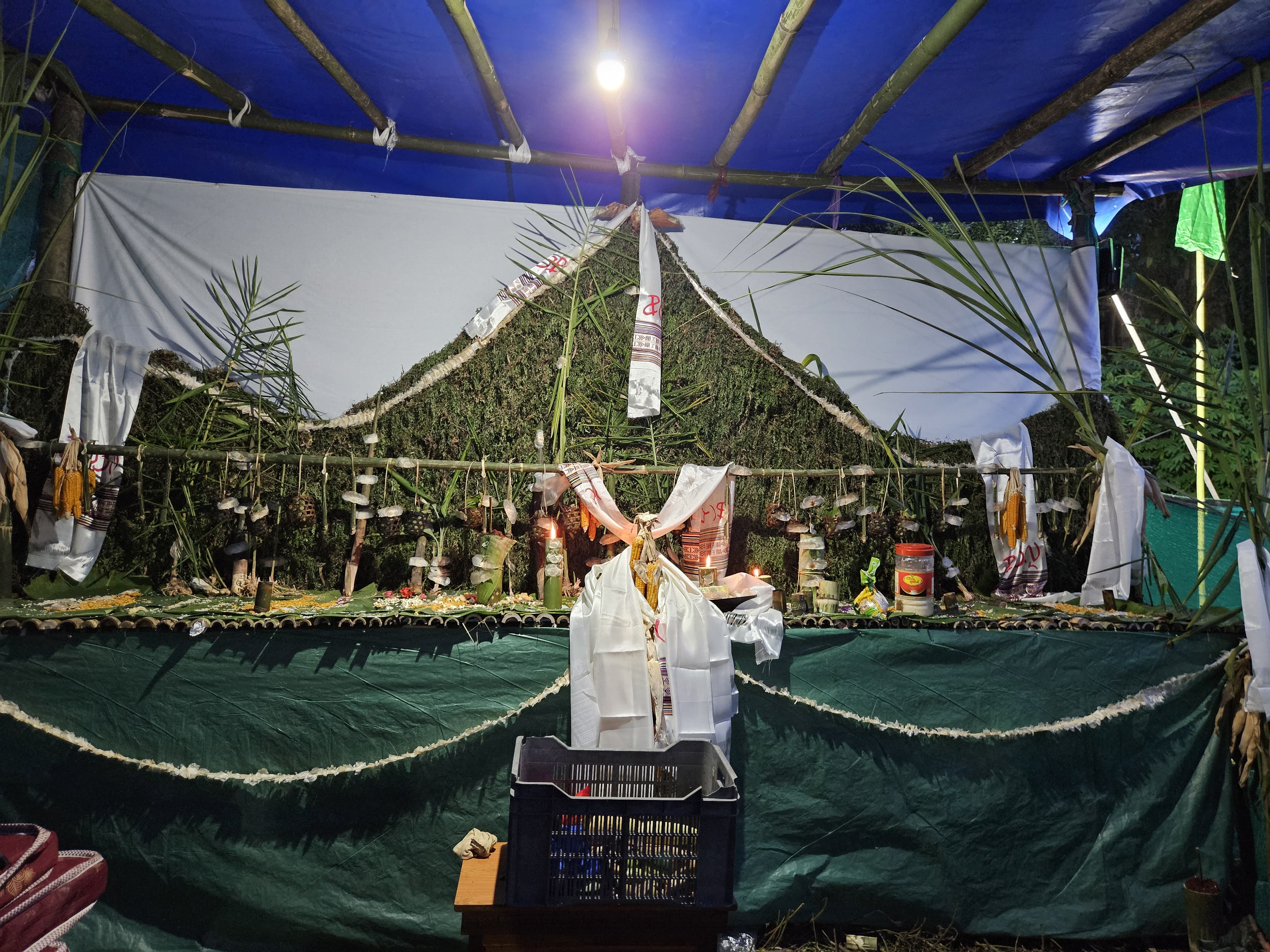
Tendong Hlo Rum Faat celebration in Ranka, Sikkim on 8th August 2024

Tendong Lho Rumfaat (Prayer of the Tendong Mountain) is a festival of the Lepcha people indigenous to the Eastern Himalayan region of Sikkim, Darjeeling Himalaya, parts of Nepal and Bhutan. The festival is celebrated on the 8th of August as a state holiday in Sikkim. According to Lepcha beliefs, their ancestors went atop the Tendong Hill located in Namchi, Sikkim, during the great deluge that nearly wiped off the Lepcha population. This festival commemorates Mt Tendong as their saviour. It also celebrates the folklore of Teesta Rangeet, that forms an essential part of Lepcha culture.
