= Bhutia (disambiguation) =

Bhutia are a community of Tibetan people in Sikkim, India.

Bhutia may also refer to:

- Bhutia language, a language used in Bhutan and India.
- Bhutia (surname), a surname used by the people
  - Bhaichung Bhutia, an Indian footballer
- Bhutia Horse, a breed of small mountain horse from Sikkim, India
- Bhutia Busty, a town in West Bengal, India
  - Bhutia Busty Monastery in Bhutia Busty
- Bhaichung Bhutia Football Schools, a football youth development initiative in India
- Nepali Bhutia Lepcha, a political party in Sikkim, India

== See also ==
- Bhotia (disambiguation)
- Sikkimese (disambiguation), language spoken by the Bhutia
- Bhutani (disambiguation)
