= Bote =

Bote may refer to

== Places ==
- Bote Mountain in the United States
- Qafë Botë, a mountain pass through the Albanian mountains

== People ==
- José Solano y Bote (1726–1806), Spanish naval officer
- David Bote, American baseball player
- Bote & Bock, a German publishing house

== Publications ==
- Bote der Urschweiz, a German-language daily newspaper in Switzerland
- Der Elsässer Bote, a defunct German-language daily newspaper in France
- Der Bote (the Messager), a defunct German-language newspaper in Canada
- Hinkender Bote, the title of several almanacs which appeared in Switzerland in 17th–18th centuries

== Other uses ==
- bote, an Old English word for estovers: house-bote, cart or plough-bote, hedge or hay-bote, and fire-bote
- "Botë, a song by Lindita and a Eurovision Song Contest entry
- Bote-Darai language of Nepal

== See also ==
- Inday Bote, a 2015 Philippine fantasy comedy-drama television series
- Porta-bote, a boat
- Ribeira Bote, an association football club in Cape Verde
- Botte (disambiguation)
- Bhoti (disambiguation)
