= Mahakal temple =

Hindu temple in India

- महाकाल मन्दिर
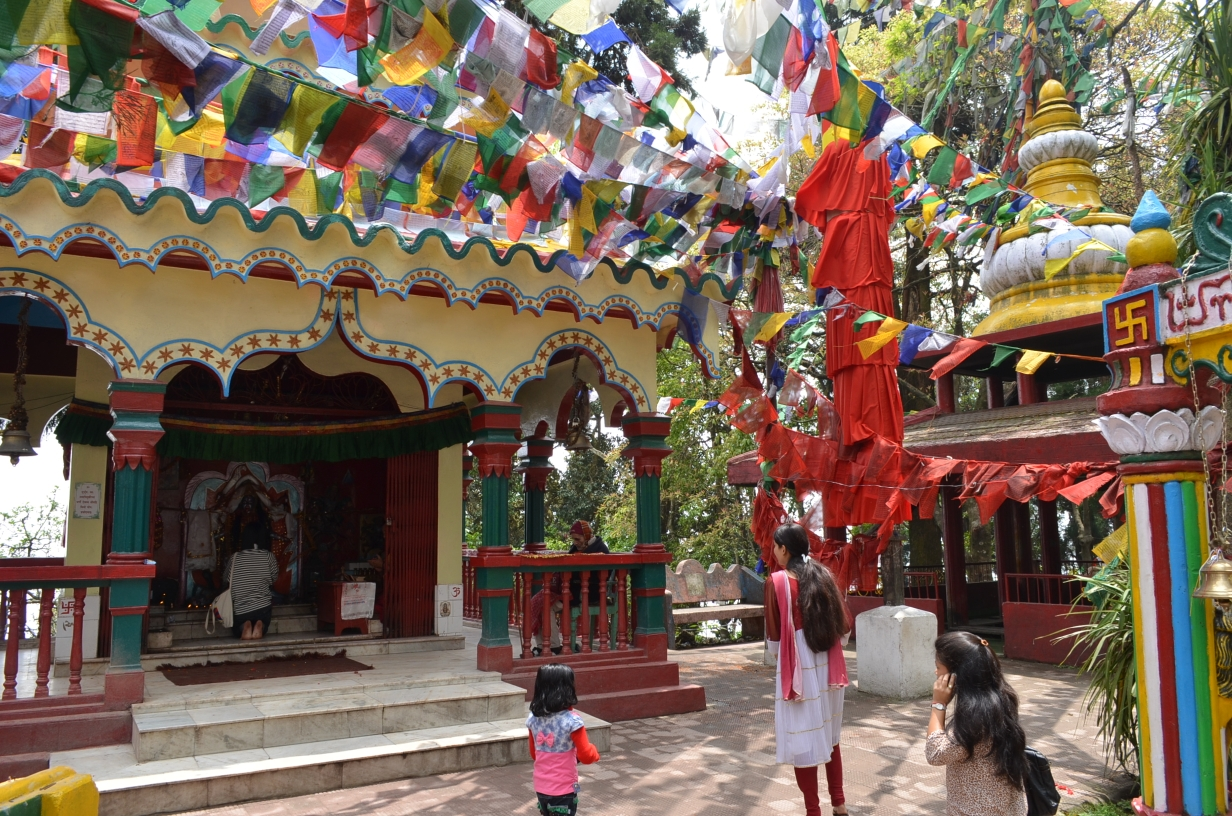

Religion
- Affiliation: Hinduism
- District: Darjeeling district
- Deity: Mahakala
- Festivals: All major Hindu and Buddhist festivals

Location
- Location: Darjeeling
- State: West Bengal
- Country: India
- Interactive map of Mahakal temple
- Coordinates: 27°02′52″N 88°16′05″E

Architecture
- Type: Temple
- Creator: Lama Dorjey Rinzing
- Established: 1782

The Mahakal temple or Mahakal mandir (Devanagari: महाकाल मन्दिर; lit. 'The master of Kaal [time]') is a sacred Hindu temple located in Darjeeling, West Bengal, India, dedicated to the Hindu god Shiva, the third god in the Hindu triumvirate. The temple was built in 1782 by Lama Dorjey Rinzing and is perched atop the Observatory Hill and is an amalgamation of Hindu and Buddhist religions. It is a religious site where both religions coexist harmoniously.

== History ==
Mahakal temple stands as a historical edifice on the spot where a Buddhist Monastery named 'Dorje-Ling' once stood, which was built by Lama Dorjey Rinzing in 1765. Prior to that it is believed that the spot was a sacred spot of the aboriginal Lepcha folks. Later a monastery was constructed on the spot and worshipped by both Lepchas and Bhutias.

It was after the invasion of the Gurkha Army around 1788 that the monastery was desecrated and destroyed by the invading troops and in course of time the sacred place overwhelmingly began to represent the Hindu symbolisms of the majority Nepali community. Legend has it that three Shiva-Lingas representing Brahma, Vishnu and Maheshwar (Shiva) manifested themselves at the site in 1782. The monastery itself was plundered and destroyed in 1815 during the Gorkha invasion after which it was shifted to Bhutia Busty about a mile away and was called the Bhutia Busty Monastery. The temple is a much revered and visited religious shrine of the area.

Legend has it that the name Darjeeling was derived from the name of the monastery 'Dorje-Ling' itself.

== Temple complex ==
The main Mahakal temple is devoted to Shiva and it witness devotees from all sections of society and religions most visiting the temple for both leisure or pilgrimage. Bells and hundreds of colorful prayer flags line the up-hill walk and the shrine.

The three gold plated Lingams inside the main temple represent Hindu Gods Brahma, Bishnu and Maheswar. There are idols of Buddha alongside the Lingams where both a Hindu priest and a Buddhist monk perform religious rituals and offer prayers simultaneously.

Within the temple complex is a white 'chorten' (Tibetan memorial shrine) where lies the relics of Dorjey Rinzing Lama the original builder of the site. Dotted around are many other smaller shrines and temples dedicated to Goddess Kali, Goddess Durga, Saat Kanya Bhagavati Devi, Ganesha, Krishna, Rama, Shirdi Sai Baba, Hanuman, Goddess Parvati, Radha and other Gods and Goddesses.

An example of interfaith worship witnessed in the Mahakal Temple, Darjeeling.

=== Location ===
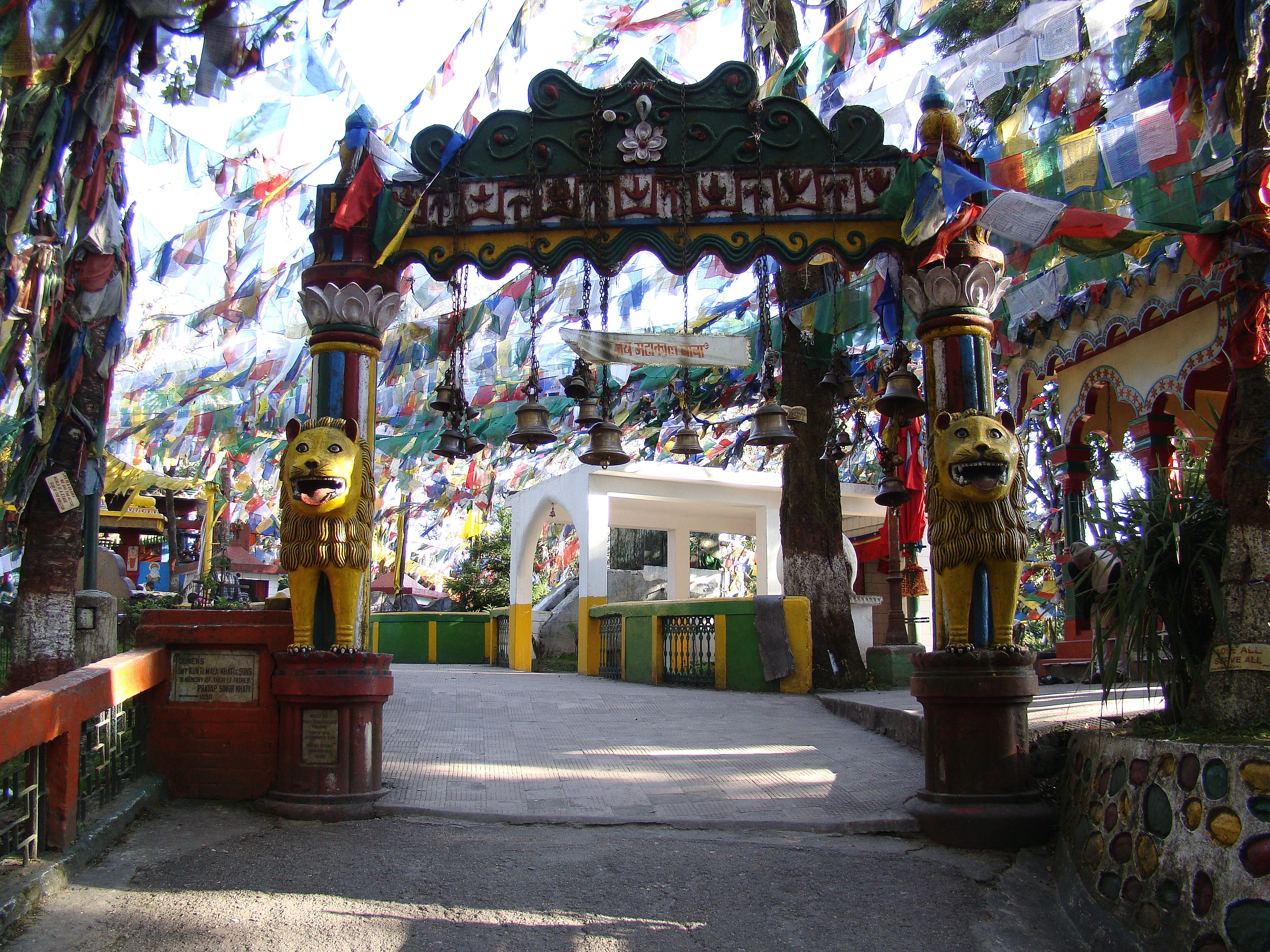
Entrance to the Mahakal temple complex

Mahakal temple is located behind the Chowrasta and encircled by the Mall Road on the ridge of Darjeeling town. The approach is an uphill narrow road about 100 yards from the Mall and is accessible by foot only.

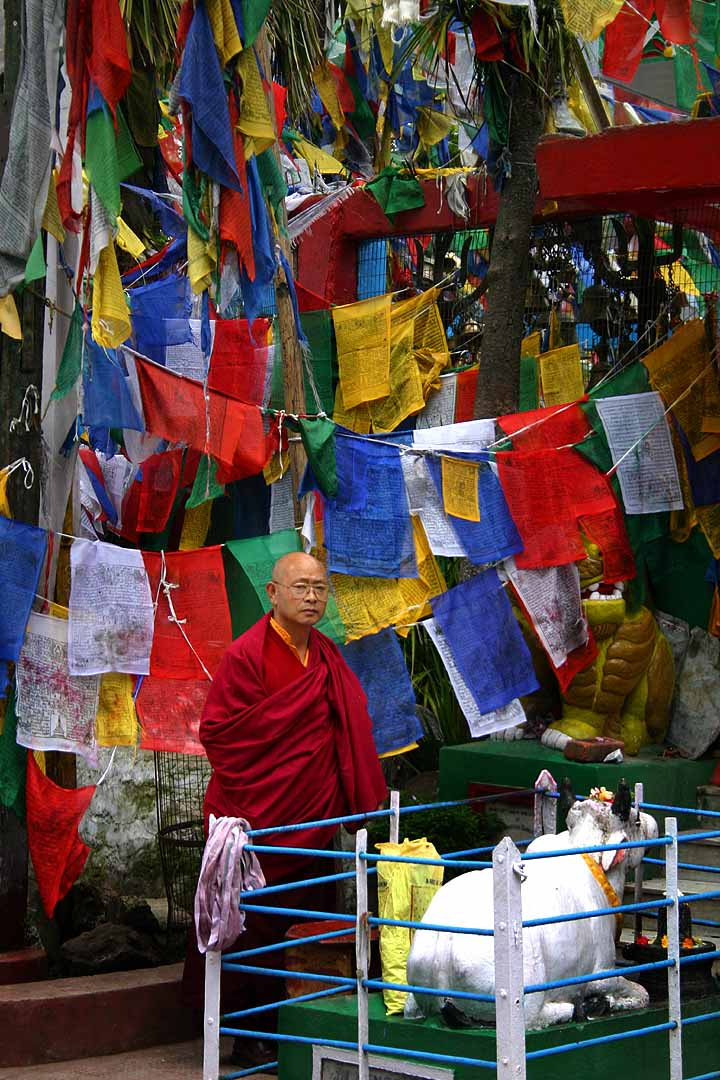
A Buddhist monk next to the entrance to the Mahakal temple complex. Nandi the sacred bull (Shiva's vehicle on the bottom right). Colorful prayer flags behind the monk.

== Geographic significance ==
The Observatory Hill is rich in flora and fauna unique to the Himalayan mountain range. The world's third-highest peak, mount Kanchenjunga, can also be seen in full from atop the temple complex.

== See also ==
- Chowrasta Darjeeling
- Observatory Hill, Darjeeling
- Bhutia Busty Monastery
- Dhirdham Temple
