= Outline of Sikkim =

Overview of and topical guide to Sikkim

Location of Sikkim

The following outline is provided as an overview of and topical guide to Sikkim:

Sikkim – landlocked state of India, the last to give up its monarchy and fully integrate into India, in 1975. With 607,688 inhabitants as of the 2011 census, Sikkim is the least populous state in India and the second-smallest state after Goa in total area, covering approximately 7,096 km2 (2,740 sq mi). Sikkim is nonetheless geographically diverse due to its location in the Himalayas; the climate ranges from subtropical to high alpine, and Kangchenjunga, the world's third-highest peak, is located on Sikkim's border with Nepal.

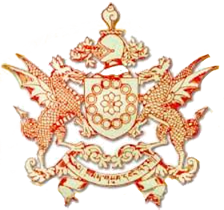
Seal of Sikkim

== General reference ==
=== Names ===
- Common English name: Sikkim
  - Pronunciation:
- Official English name(s): Sikkim
- Nicknames
  - Su Khyim, Denjong, Beyul Demazong, Nye-mae-el, Indrakil
- Adjectivals
  - Sikkimese
- Demonyms
  - Sikkimese
- Abbreviations and name codes
  - ISO 3166-2 code: IND-SK
  - Vehicle registration code: SK

=== Rankings (amongst India's states) ===
- by population: 29th
- by area (2011 census): 28th
- by crime rate (2015):
- by gross domestic product (GDP) (2014): 28th
- by Human Development Index (HDI):
- by life expectancy at birth:
- by literacy rate:

== Geography of Sikkim ==
Geography of Sikkim

- Sikkim is: an Indian state
- Population of Sikkim:
- Area of Sikkim:
- Atlas of Sikkim

=== Location of Sikkim ===
- Sikkim is situated within the following regions:
  - Northern Hemisphere
  - Eastern Hemisphere
    - Eurasia
      - Asia
        - South Asia
          - India
            - Northeast India
- Time zone: Indian Standard Time (UTC+05:30)

=== Regions of Sikkim ===
==== Administrative divisions of Sikkim ====
===== Districts of Sikkim =====
- Districts of Sikkim
  - Gangtok
  - Pakyong
  - Soreng
  - Namchi
  - Gyalshing
  - Mangan

===== Municipalities of Sikkim =====
Municipalities of Sikkim

- Capital of Sikkim: Capital of Sikkim
- Cities of Sikkim

=== Demography of Sikkim ===
Demographics of Sikkim

== Government and politics of Sikkim ==
Politics of Sikkim

- Form of government: Indian state government (parliamentary system of representative democracy)
- Capital of Sikkim: Capital of Sikkim
- Elections in Sikkim

=== Union government in Sikkim ===
- Rajya Sabha members from Sikkim
- Sikkim Pradesh Congress Committee
- Indian general election, 2009 (Sikkim)

=== Branches of the government of Sikkim ===
Government of Sikkim

==== Executive branch of the government of Sikkim ====
- Head of state: Governor of Sikkim
- Head of government: Chief Minister of Sikkim

==== Legislative branch of the government of Sikkim ====
Sikkim Legislative Assembly

=== Law and order in Sikkim ===
- Law enforcement in Sikkim
  - Sikkim Police

== History of Sikkim ==
History of Sikkim

== Culture of Sikkim ==
- Cuisine of Sikkim
- Languages of Sikkim
- Monuments in Sikkim
  - Monuments of National Importance in Sikkim
  - State Protected Monuments in Sikkim
- World Heritage Sites in Sikkim

=== Art in Sikkim ===
- Music of Sikkim

=== People of Sikkim ===
People of Sikkim

- List of chief ministers of Sikkim

=== Religion in Sikkim ===
Religion in Sikkim

- Christianity in Sikkim
- Hinduism in Sikkim

=== Sports in Sikkim ===
Sports in Sikkim

- Cricket in Sikkim
  - Sikkim Cricket Association
- Football in Sikkim
  - Sikkim Football Association
  - Sikkim football team

=== Symbols of Sikkim ===
Symbols of Sikkim

- State mammal: Red panda
- State bird: Blood pheasant
- State flower: Noble orchid
- State seal: Seal of Sikkim
- State tree: Rhododendron

== Economy and infrastructure of Sikkim ==
- Tourism in Sikkim

== Education in Sikkim ==
Education in Sikkim

- Institutions of higher education in Sikkim

== Health in Sikkim ==
Health in Sikkim

== See also ==
- Outline of India
