= Bhotia =

Bhotia or Bhotiya may refer to:

- Bhotia people, a generic term for people of the Himalayas
- Bhotia language, a reference to any of the languages spoken by Bhotia people
- Bhotia dog, a breed of livestock guardian dog also known as the Himalayan sheepdog

== See also ==
- Bhutia (disambiguation)
- Bhoti (disambiguation)
- Bhutani (disambiguation)
