= Alsace (disambiguation) =

Alsace is a cultural and historical region in eastern France and until 2016 an administrative région of France.

Alsace may also refer to:

== In geography ==
=== Australia ===
- Alsace, Queensland, a locality in the Central Highlands Region

=== Europe ===
- Alsace wine region
- Alsace-Lorraine
- Duchy of Alsace

=== North America ===
- Alsace, California
- Alsace Township, Pennsylvania

== Other ==
- Alsace (automobile), an American automobile
- Alsace wine
- Alsace (film), a 1916 French film
- Alsace, an Aquitaine class frigate of French navy
- Alsace class battleship, a French project in 1939, not built

== See also ==
- Alsatian (disambiguation)
