= Busty =

Busty means to have large breasts. It may also refer to:

== People ==
- Busty Ashbaugh (1889–1953), American football player
- Busty Heart (born 1961), American television personality
- Busty Underwood (born 1948), American football player

== Other uses ==
- Busty and the Bass, Canadian band
- Bhutia Busty, town in India
