= Bush (automobile) =

Automobile manufacturer

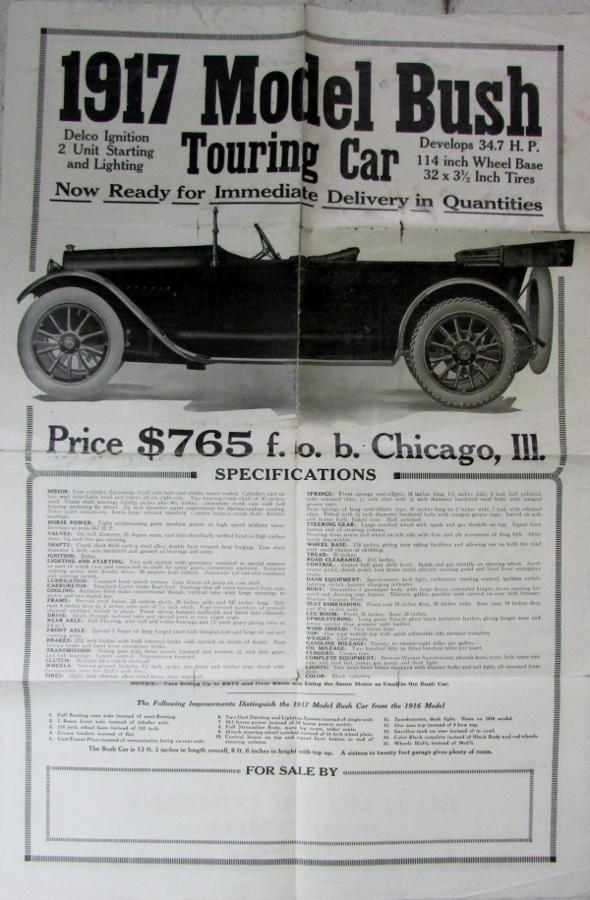
Advertising brochure for 1917 Bush touring car

The Bush was a mail-order car made by the Bush Motor Company of Chicago from 1916 to 1925. John H. Bush sent out brochures advertising the Bush and requesting payment in advance for the delivery of a vehicle. When an order was received, it was forwarded along with the customer's payment to an existing manufacturer who was willing to build the car, such as Huffman Crow-Elkhart, or Piedmont. A Bush nameplate was attached to a vehicle on the production line, and it was delivered directly to the customer. All Bush cars were open touring models, powered by either Lycoming or Continental 4- and 6-cylinder engines.

Bush did not sell many vehicles, but because his out-of-pocket expenses were small, he was able to continue the operation for nearly a decade. However, most of these companies were struggling or already out of business by the mid-1920's, and John H Bush's failure to find a new manufacturer to carry on the same arrangement resulted in the end of the Bush Motor Company.
