= Elsässer =

Elsässer or Elsaesser or Elsasser means Alsatian in German. It may refer to:

- Gert Elsässer (born 1949), Austrian skeleton racer and gold medalist in 1982
- Hayley Elsaesser, Canadian fashion designer
- Martin Elsaesser (1884–1957), German architect and professor of architecture
- Thomas Elsaesser (1943–2019), German film historian
- Walter M. Elsasser (1904–1991), German-born American physicist
- Jürgen Elsässer (born 1957), German journalist
- Elsaesser (grape), another name for the wine grape Chasselas
- The Elsasser Bakery in South Omaha, Nebraska

== See also ==
- Alsatian (disambiguation)
- The Alsatian dialect of German, which calls itself Elsässerditsch
- Der Elsässer Bote
- Elsäßerbach
- Images Alsaciennes/Elsässer Bilderbogen, published by Charles Spindler in 1893-6
