= Jalapahar =

Coordinates: 27°03′N 88°16′E

- Village
- Location in West Bengal, India Jalapahar (India)
- Country: India
- State: West Bengal
- District: Darjeeling

Population (2011)
  - Total: 2,768
- Time zone: UTC+5:30 (IST)
- Lok Sabha constituency: Darjeeling
- Vidhan Sabha constituency: Kurseong
- Website: darjeeling.gov.in

Jalapahar is a ridge as well as a locality in the hilly town of Darjeeling in the Indian state of West Bengal. There was a British military camp in this locality in the Raj days. This ridge meets Katapahar ridge at Observatory Hill. St. Paul's School is located here.

The range on which Darjeeling is located is Y-shaped with the base resting at Katapahar and Jalapahar and two arms diverging north of Observatory Hill. The north-eastern arm dips suddenly and ends in the Lebong spur, while the north-western arm passes through North Point and ends in the valley near Tukver Tea Estate.

A manor in Jalapahar is Bryanstone, built in 1848. It was the residence of two Indologists, J.D.Hooker and Brian Hodgson. St. Paul's School was transferred to Darjeeling in 1864. It occupies, among other buildings, Bryanstone.
