= Journal of Applied Electrochemistry =

- Discipline: Chemistry
- Language: English
- Edited by: Gerardine G. Botte

Publication details
- History: 1971–present
- Publisher: Springer (Netherlands)
- Frequency: Monthly
- Open access: Hybrid (Transformative Journal)
- License: CC BY 4.0
- Impact factor: 3.0 (2024)

Standard abbreviations
- ISO 4: J. Appl. Electrochem.

Indexing
- CODEN: JAELBJ
- ISSN: 0021-891X (print); 1572-8838 (web)

Links
- Journal homepage; Online Access

The Journal of Applied Electrochemistry is a peer-reviewed scientific journal published by Springer Science+Business Media, which focuses on the technological applications of electrochemistry.

Subjects covered are energy conversion, conservation, and storage, industrial synthesis, environmental remediation, electrochemical engineering, supercapacitors, fuel and solar cells, cell design, corrosion, hydrometallurgy, surface finishing, electroplating, electrodeposition, and other applications of electrochemical research.

The journal is affiliated with the International Society of Electrochemistry.

== History ==
The Journal of Applied Electrochemistry was established in 1971 under founding editor Douglas Inman to supplement existing journals that focused on research into fundamental electrochemical science.

The journal's current editor is Gerardine G. Botte.

== Abstracting and indexing ==
The journal is abstracted and indexed in the Science Citation Index Expanded, Scopus, Inspec, and Current Contents/Physical, Chemical and Earth Sciences.

According to the Journal Citation Reports, the journal has a 2024 impact factor of 3.0.
