= Botte =

Botte may refer to:

- The Bottom, a town of the island of Saba, the Caribbean Netherlands, formerly named Botte
- Gerardine Botte, Venezuelan-American chemist
- Rocco Botte (born 1983), an American actor
