= Windamere Hotel =

Heritage hotel in India

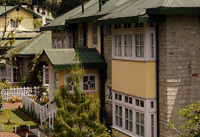
- Windamere hotel
- Interactive map of the Windamere Hotel area

General information
- Location: (India) Observatory Hill, Darjeeling.
- Coordinates: 27°02′45″N 88°16′04″E
- Opening: 1841; 185 years ago

Other information
- Number of rooms: 46 Rooms

Website
- Official site

Windamere Hotel, built as 'Ada Villa' in 1841 and then turned into a boarding house for tea planters and other Raj types, on contract, in the late 1880s. In 1939, it became 'Windamere Hotel', a colonial hotel situated on Observatory Hill, in Darjeeling, India.

== History ==
The hotel started out as boarding house for bachelor British tea planters in Darjeeling, in what was then British India, were built in 1841 and opened up as a Boarding House in the late 1880s. It was acquired by Tenduf La, a Sikkimese of Tibetan descent, who turned it into a hotel with the name Windamere. The hotel became more widely known as Darjeeling became the summer capital of Bengal Presidency. It expanded and took over a new wing, formerly the Loreto Convent, where the actress Vivien Leigh had spent some years in childhood.

In 1959, Palden Thondup Namgyal, Crown Prince of Sikkim, met his future wife Hope Cooke for the first time in the Windamere Hotel.

The hotel is also known for its views of the tea plantations below and of Mount Kangchenjunga, the third highest peak in the world.
