= Katapahar =

Katapahar is a ridge in Darjeeling town in the Indian state of West Bengal. Katapahar and Jalapahar ridges meet at Observatory Hill.

The range on which Darjeeling is located is Y-shaped with the base resting at Katapahar and Jalapahar and two arms diverging north of Observatory Hill. The north-eastern arm dips suddenly and ends in the Lebong spur, while the north-western arm passes through North Point and ends in the valley near Tukver Tea Estate.
