= Alsatian =

Alsatian may refer to:

- A person from the Alsace region of northeast France
- Alsatian dialect, the language or dialect of Alsace
- German Shepherd, a breed of dog also known as an Alsatian in the UK
- RMS Empress of France (1913), ocean liner originally named the SS Alsatian

== See also ==
- Alsace (disambiguation)
- Elsässer (disambiguation)
- List of Alsatians
