= Observatory Hill, Darjeeling =

Hill in Darjeeling, India

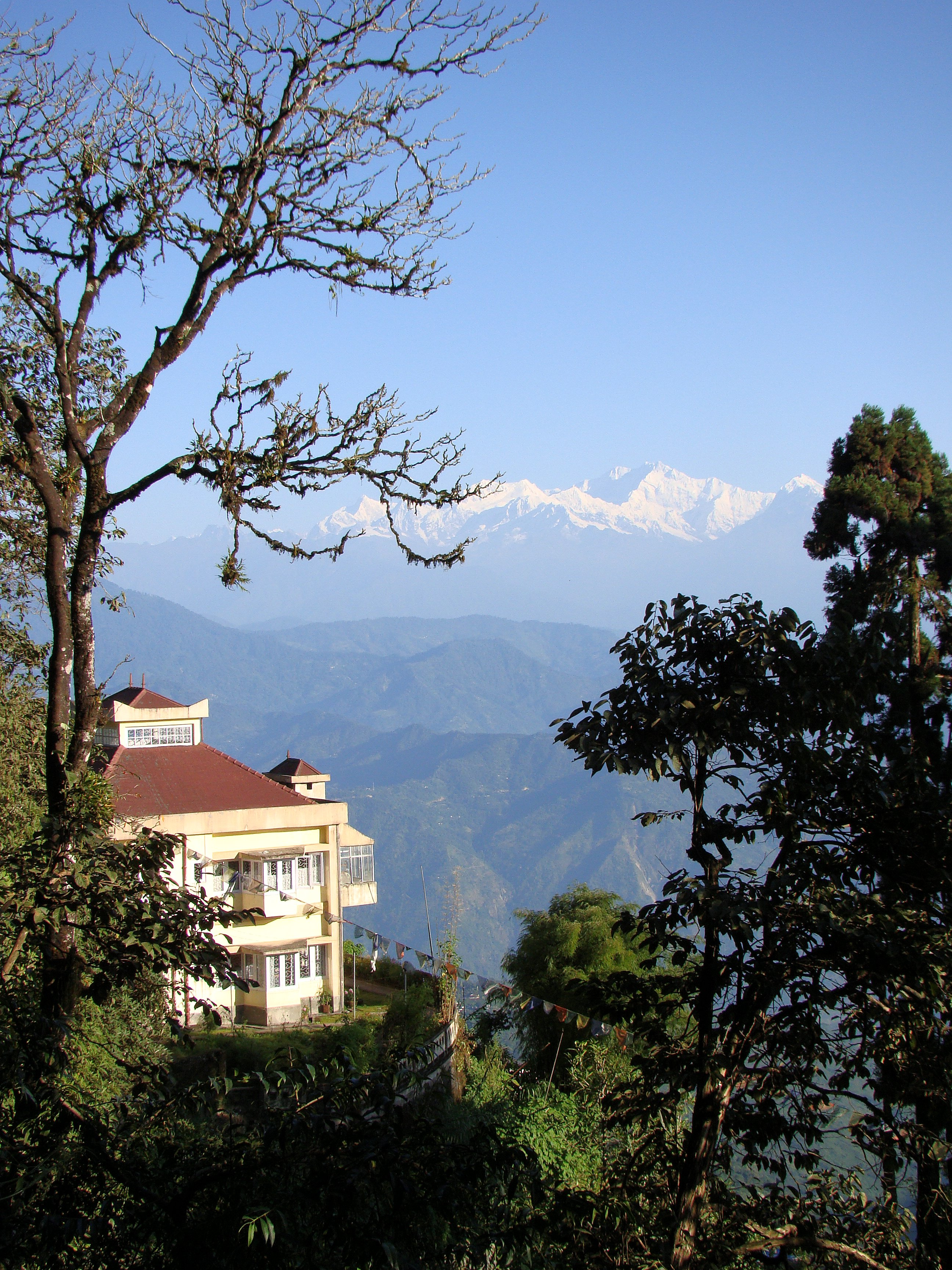
View to Kangchenjunga from the eastern side of Observatory Hill

Observatory Hill is a hill near Chowrasta square, or The Mall as it is popularly known, in Darjeeling, West Bengal, India. Views of snow-clad peaks, including Mount Kanchenjunga, are visible from the Observatory Hill. The Bhutia Busty monastery was originally located here. Now the hill has the temple of Mahakal. Two important arteries of the town, Nehru Road and Bhanubhakta Sarani, meet at Chowrasta. Another school of thought suggests that the presence of the megalithic core to have been a place of worship of the Rongs, representing a sacred location of the classic Long Chok (erect stones) type.

== Temple ==
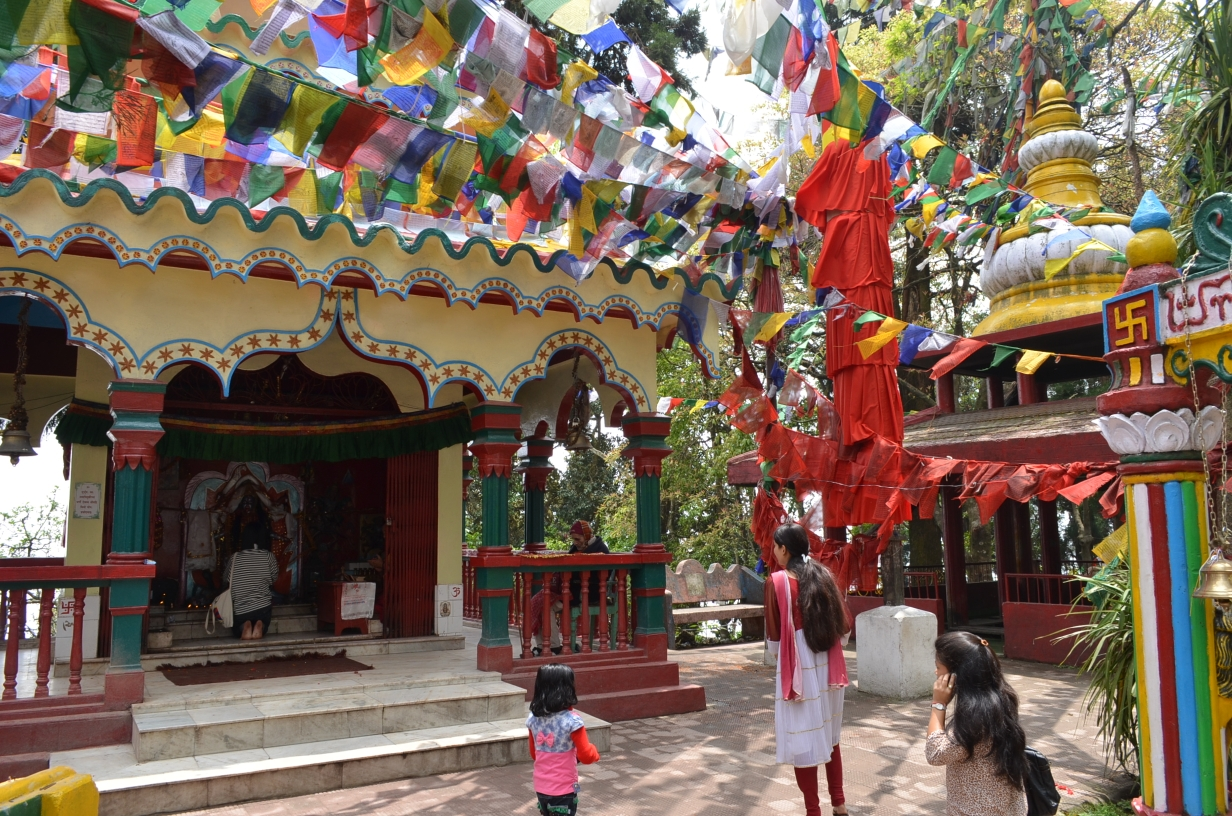
Temple, Observatory Hill, Darjeeling.

Rising abruptly from Chowrasta is the hilltop. Situated atop is the ancient temple of Mahakal, a form of Lord Shiva. There is a cave sacred to worshippers in the temple. In Sanskrit, the word "Durjay Ling", means "Shiva of invincible prowess, who rules the Himalayas." There is a suggestion that the name Darjeeling could have emanated from this name. The place where the Mahakal Temple stands was once occupied by the Buddhist monastery. It is still a place of great sanctity for the Bhutias. Bells ring in the midst of fluttering flags, which are used to pray in the shrine. Monkeys are seen in plenty at the Observatory Hill.

== Tourist centre ==
Chowrasta and The Mall around Observatory Hill are among the main centres of tourist attraction in Darjeeling. They spread on hill slopes at an altitude of 2,134 metres (7,000 feet). In clear weather, one can see Mount Kanchenjungha and twelve other peaks, all above 20,000 feet. The view is clear during October to November. At other times of the year, clouds sometimes engulf the area and some portions of the view available only at opportune moments. Some people, similar to the characters in Satyajit Ray's Kanchenjungha, wait for long periods of time for the mist to clear so that they may have a view of third highest peak in the world. Apart from the mountain views, tourists come to the Chowrasta for pony rides (mostly by children) and collecting souvenirs.

== Around the hill ==
There are several places around Observatory Hill. Birch Hill, or Jawahar Parbat, an offshoot from The Mall, is a residential section where the Raj Bhavan is situated. The Himalayan Mountaineering Institute is located on the western spur of Jawahar Parbat, about a kilometre and half from Observatory Hill. The Windamere Hotel and West Bengal Government's Tourist Lodge stand above The Mall. Windamere, a cozy boarding area of the bachelor English and Scottish tea planters, was converted into a hotel in 1939. There are a number of hotels and restaurants in and around Chowrasta or The Mall. A road from The Mall leads to "Step Aside" - the house of the eminent freedom fighter Chittaranjan Das. He died in Darjeeling on 16 June 1925. The latest addition coming up is a large "Ranga Manch" (theatre) overlooking the Chowrasta.

The range on which Darjeeling is located is Y-shaped with the base resting at Katapahar and Jalapahar and two arms diverging north from Observatory Hill. The northeastern arm dips suddenly and ends in the Lebong spur, while the northwestern arm passes through North Point and ends in the valley near Tukver Tea Estate.

== Gallery ==
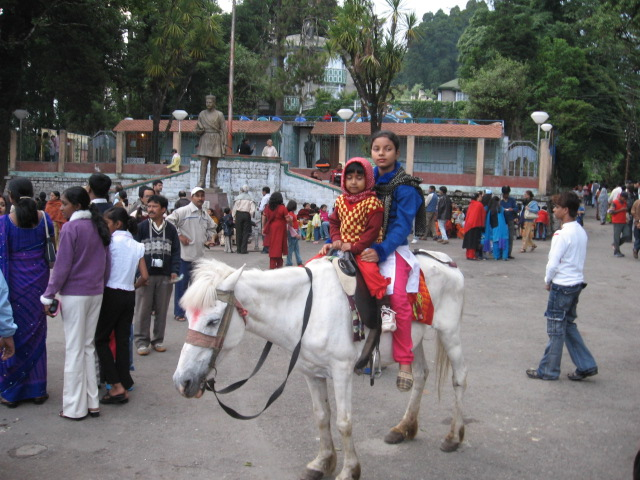
Children getting ready for a pony ride on Chowrasta

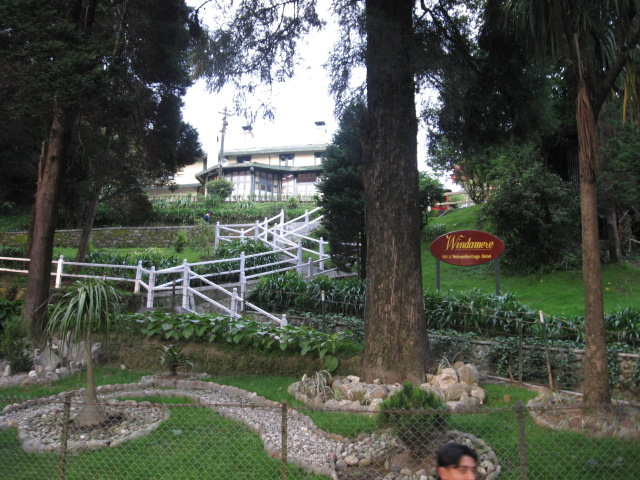
Windamere Hotel Darjeeling

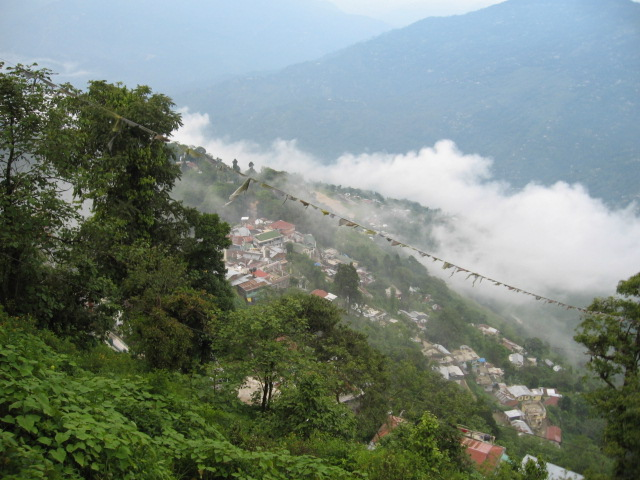
A view from The Mall

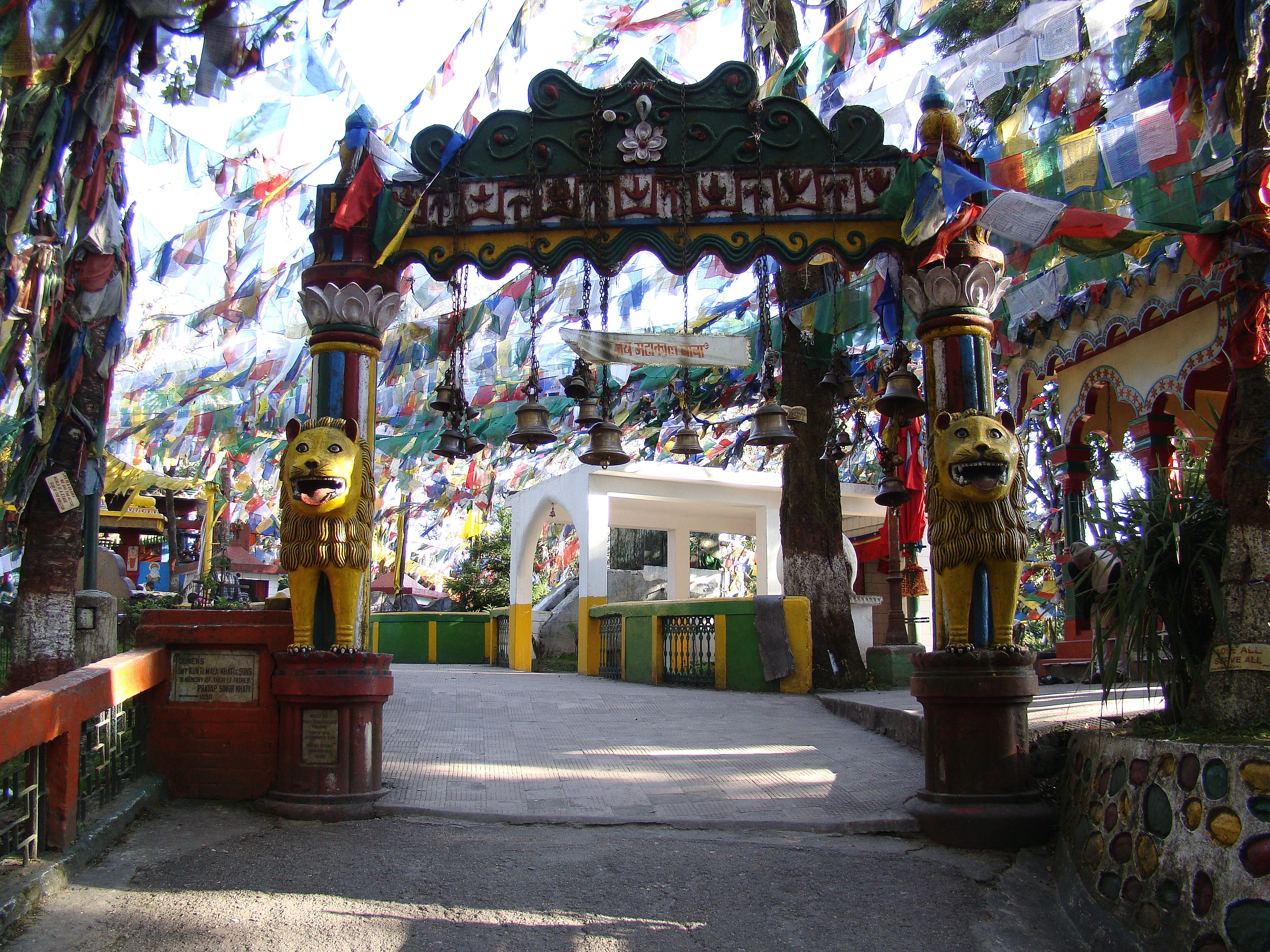
Entrance to the temple complex

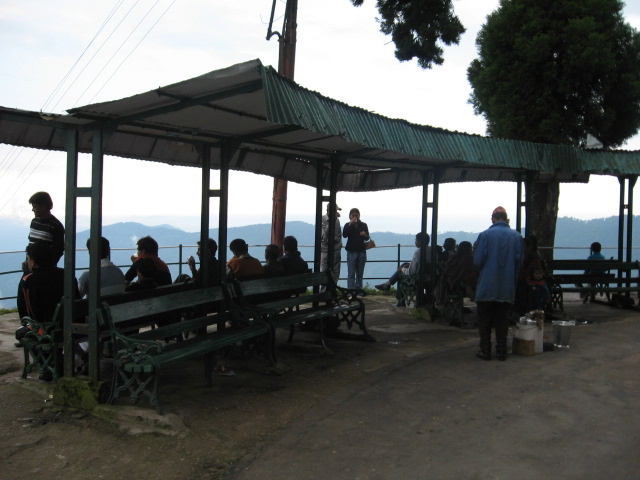
A view-point on The Mall

== See also ==
Chowrasta Darjeeling
