= Bhutia Busty Monastery =

Monastery in West Bengal

Bhutia Busty monastery
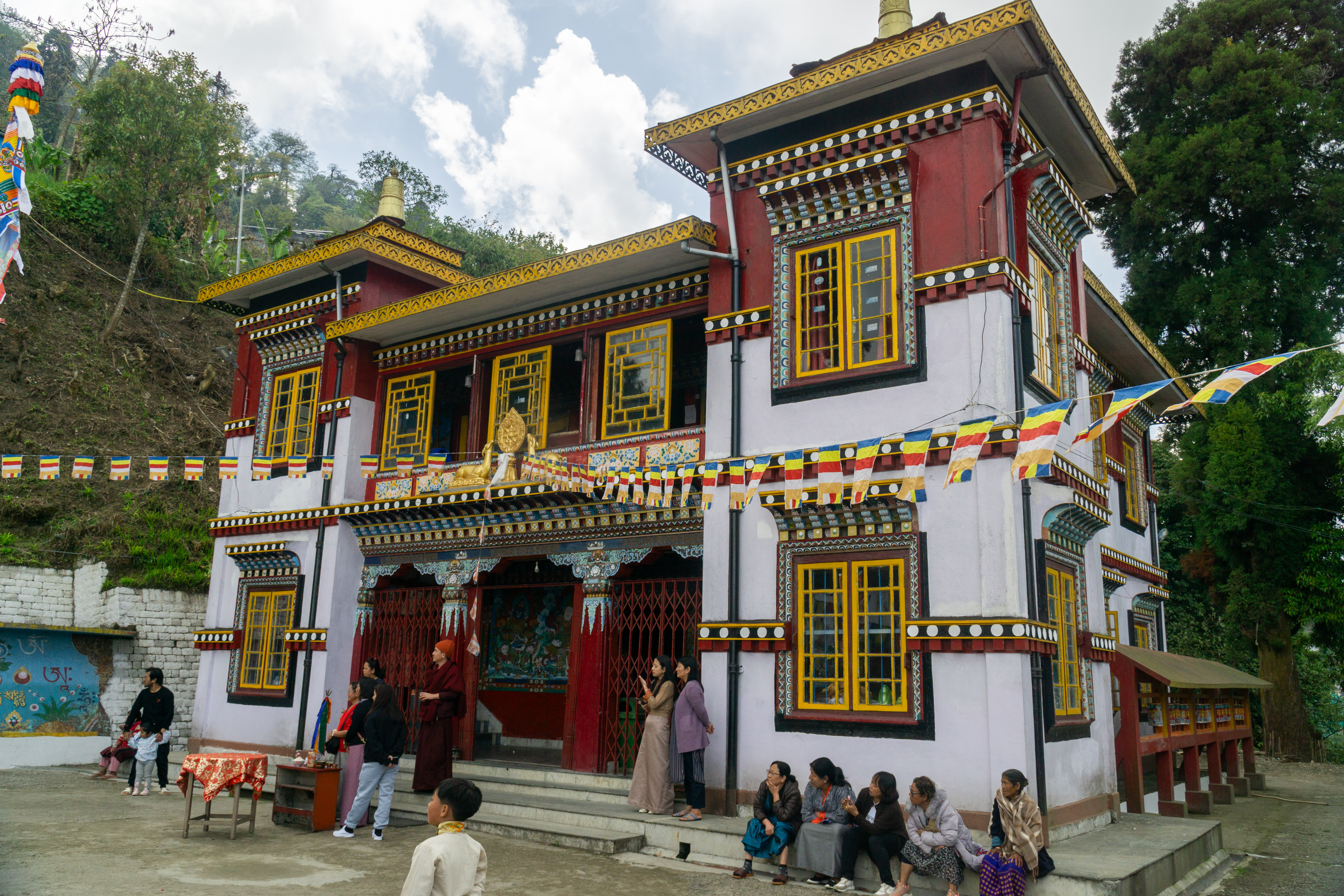
- Bhutia Busty monastery

- Location within Darjeeling region

Religion
- Affiliation: Tibetan Buddhism
- Sect: Nyingma

Location
- Location: Darjeeling, India
- Country: India
- Interactive map of Bhutia Busty monastery
- Coordinates: 27°03′01″N 88°16′12″E

Architecture
- Style: Dzong
- Established: 1879; 147 years ago

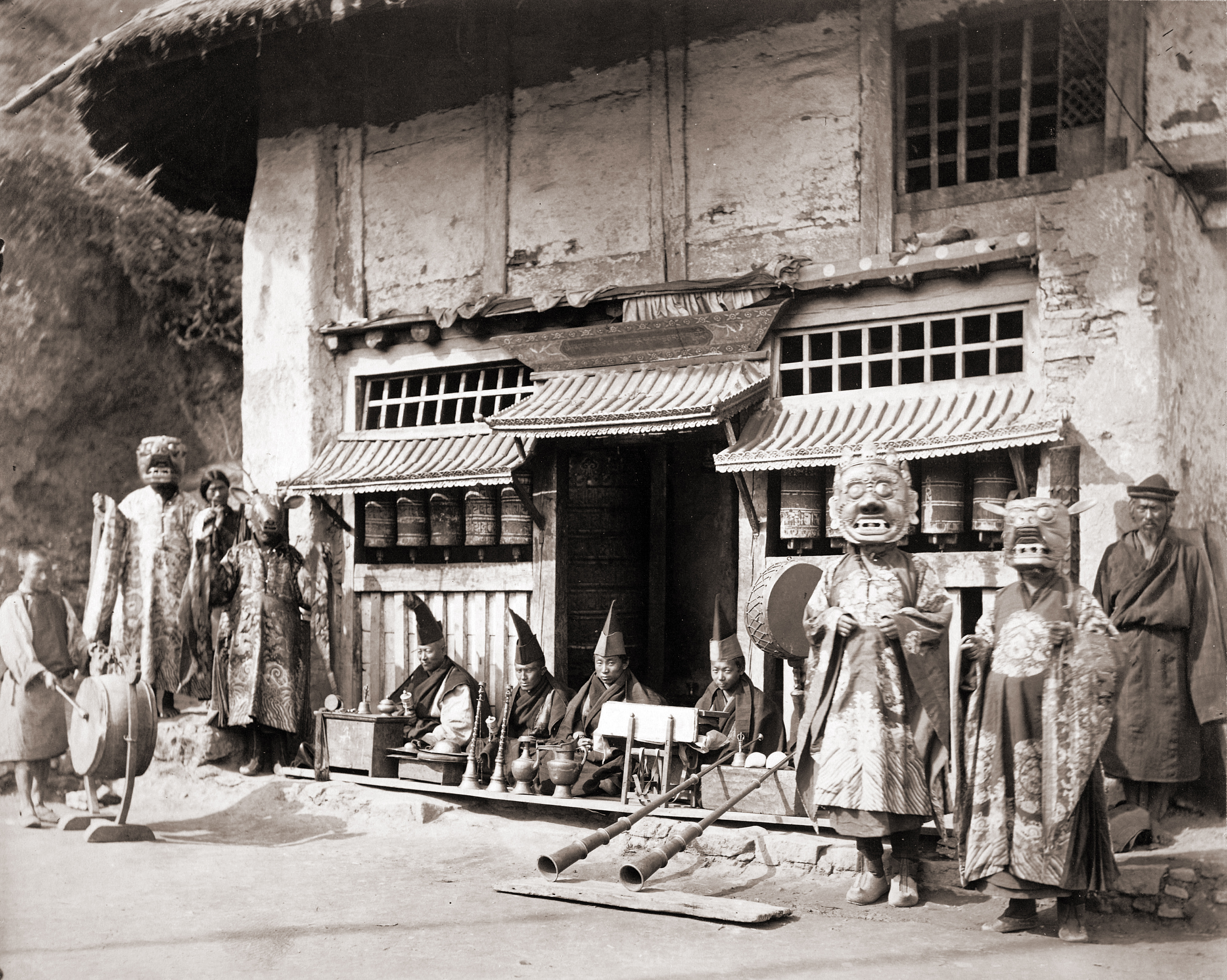
Bhutia Busty monastery, c1870

Bhutia Busty monastery or Karma Dorjee Chyoling monastery is a Buddhist monastery located in Bhutia Busty, Darjeeling district, India. It belongs to the Red Sect of Buddhist Lamas.

== History ==
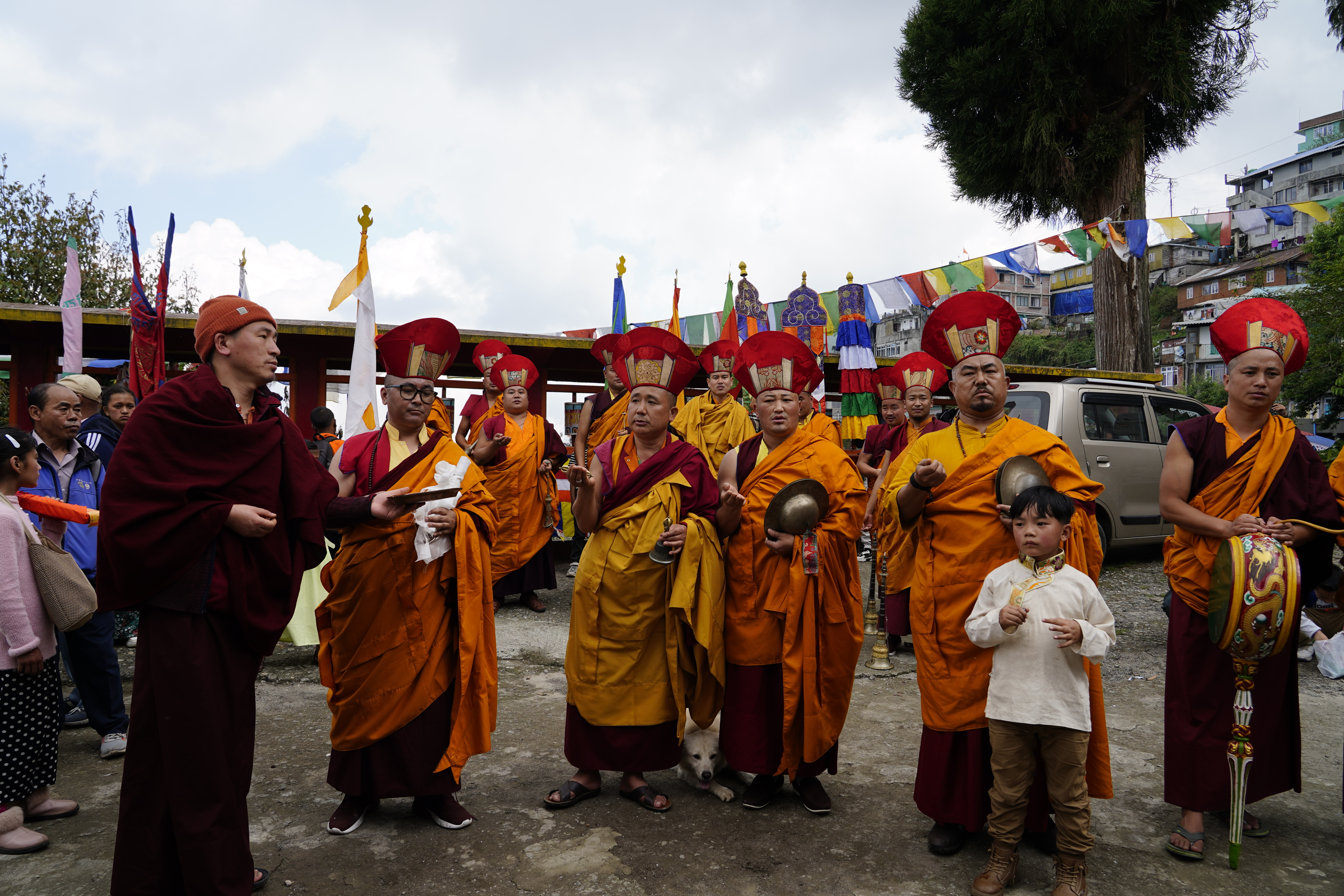
Buddha Purnima celebrations at Bhutia Busty monastery

Originally a branch of the Kagyupa sect's Phodang Monastery in Sikkim, it was transferred to Darjeeling in 1879. The original location was on the Observatory Hill. The monastic practice was violently interrupted around 1788, when Nepali troops overran the land, destroyed the monastery and converted Dotsug into a place of worship dedicated to Mahakala. The foreign troops were driven out by the British East India Company during the Anglo-Nepalese War and the territory was returned to the Chogyal of Sikkim in 1817. In the 1860s the monastery was relocated to its present location in Bhutia Busty. However, the monastery in the new location was also destroyed by an earthquake in 1934. The Chogyal of Sikkim helped rebuild it. The monastery has a collection of old Buddhist scripts. One of the original pieces of the "Book of Dead" is its prized possession.

The 193-year-old Sangchhen Thongdor Ling Gonpa or Ging Gompa (8 kilometers from town) which was set up by Pemayangtse monastery (West Sikkim) in 1818 and subscribes to the Kagyu sect.

== See also ==
- Mahakal Temple (Darjeeling)
