= Piedmont Motor Car Company =

Defunct American motor vehicle manufacturer

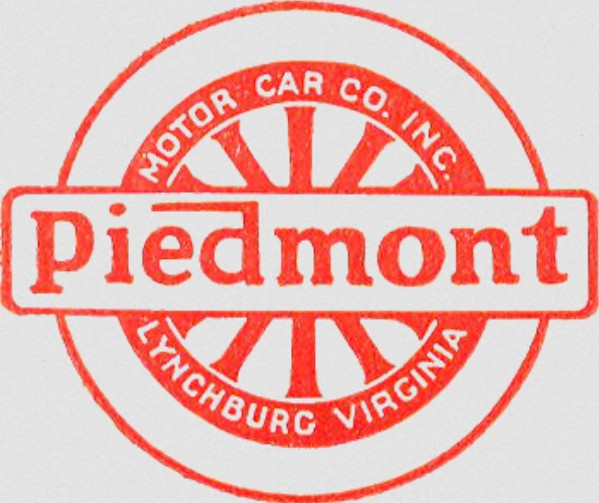
- Company type: Incorporation (business)
- Industry: Automotive
- Founded: 1916; 110 years ago
- Founder: Wallace A. Taylor, Sr.
- Defunct: 1923; 103 years ago
- Fate: Bankruptcy
- Headquarters: Lynchburg, Virginia, United States
- Products: Automobiles
- Production output: 2,470 (1917-1922)
- Brands: Piedmont, Lone Star, Brush, Alsace, Norwalk

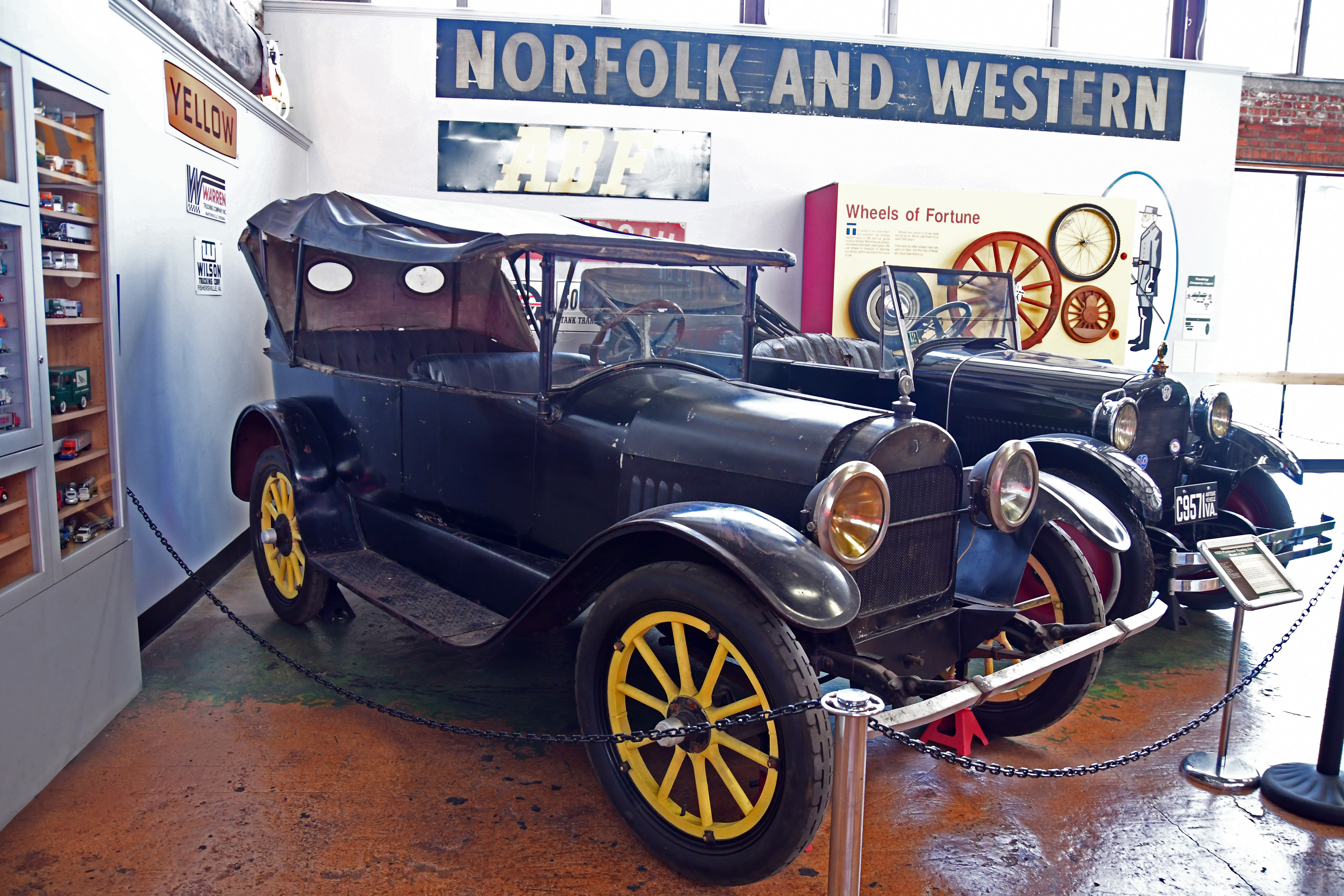
1923 Piedmont at the Virginia Museum of Transportation

The Piedmont was a vintage automobile made by the Piedmont Motor Car Company of Lynchburg, Virginia, from 1917 to 1922.

== History ==
The Piedmont was produced in a variety of closed and open body styles and was powered by 4-cylinder Lycoming and 6-cylinder Continental engines. The company also made cars for other companies, such as the Alsace, Bush, Norwalk and Lone Star. These were Piedmonts, but fitted with badges, hubcaps and other identification of the company who ordered the cars.

This badge engineering for other companies had a direct impact on the cars actually marketed and sold under the Piedmont name. With the outside orders taking priority, Piedmont dealers in Virginia were sometimes unable to provide a car for customers who placed an order, which gave the make a poor reputation, thus hindering further sales.

In December 1920 the company attempted to increase publicity and sales by advertising in the Lynchburg News ten Model 4-30 and ten Model 6-40 cars for sale to residents of Lynchburg, Campbell, Bedford, Amherst and Appomattox only, with prices reduced by $500 for each car. Sales manager George Hay also persuaded the Lynchburg Police Department to use Piedmont cars, as it would "look better for the company" if they did so.

== Closure ==
In anticipation of an ever-increasing flood of orders from outside producers, Piedmont had overstocked its inventory, which with the Depression of 1920-1921 led to the company going into receivership in October 1922. There was over $225,000 worth of parts in stock.

== Surviving cars ==
In June 2010 the Virginia Museum of Transportation received a donation of a 1923 Bush touring car, which was built by Piedmont.
