= Bhutanese =

Bhutanese may refer to:

- Something of, or related to Bhutan
- Dzongkha, the official national language of Bhutan (sometimes called "Bhutanese")
- A person from Bhutan, or of Bhutanese descent, see Demographics of Bhutan
- Bhutanese culture
- Bhutanese cuisine
- The Bhutanese, a weekly newspaper in Bhutan

== See also ==
- Bhutani (disambiguation)
- Category:Bhutanese people
