= Sikkim United Democratic Alliance =

Political alliance in sikkim

Sikkim United Democratic Alliance was a short-lived alliance of political parties in Sikkim, India, that was formed in February 2004 by Indian National Congress, Bharatiya Janata Party, Communist Party of India (Marxist), Sikkim Himali Rajya Parishad, Organization of Sikkimese Unity (OSU), Sikkim Gorkha Party (SGP), Sikkim Gorkha Prajatantrik Party (SGPP), Sikkim National Liberation Front (SNLF), Nepali Bhutia Lepcha (NEBULA), and Gorkha National Liberation Front as a joint political front.

== See also ==
- Elections in Sikkim
