= Bhoti =

Bhoti (lit. 'Tibetan') may refer to several Tibetic (Sino-Tibetan) languages spoken in India:

- Bhoti Kinnauri, a Tibetic language of Kinnaur, Himachal Pradesh, India
- Ladakhi language (Bhoti), a Tibetic language of Ladakh, India
- Spiti Bhoti, a Tibetic language of Spiti, Himachal Pradesh, India
- Stod Bhoti, a Tibetic language of Himachal Pradesh, India

== See also ==
- Bhotia (disambiguation)
- Bhutani (disambiguation)
- Tibetan language (disambiguation)
- Bhoot (disambiguation)
- Bote (disambiguation)
- Bhot, a people of Himachal Pradesh, India
