= Lone Star (1920 automobile) =

Lone Star - Defunct Automobile Manufacturer

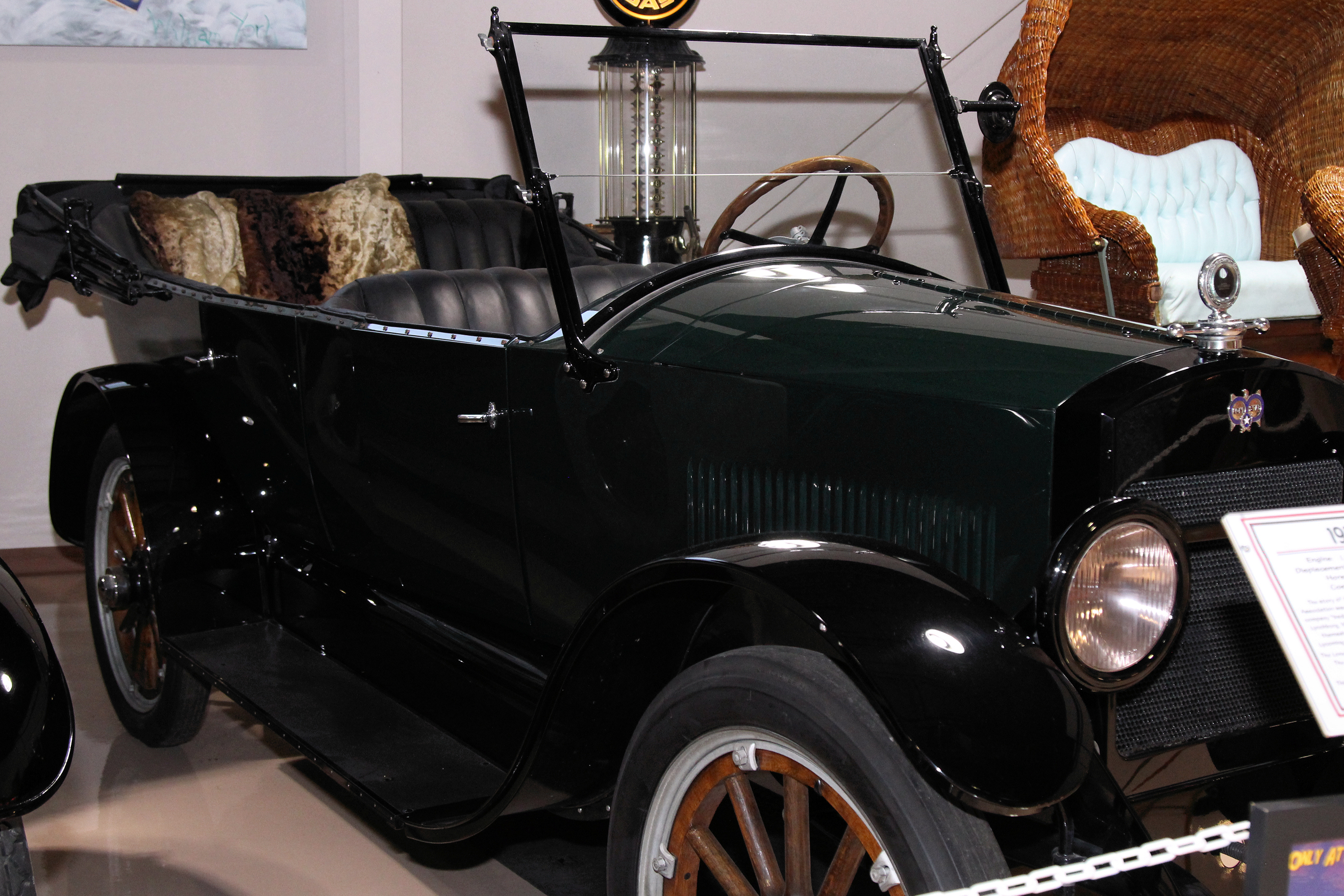
- 1920 Lone Star Beauty Four (4-30)

Overview
- Type: Automobile
- Manufacturer: Lone Star Motor Truck and Tractor Association
- Also called: 1919–1921; Beauty Four and Beauty Six, 1922; Model 4-35
- Production: 1919–1922
- Assembly: Lynchburg, Virginia

Body and chassis
- Body style: Touring car

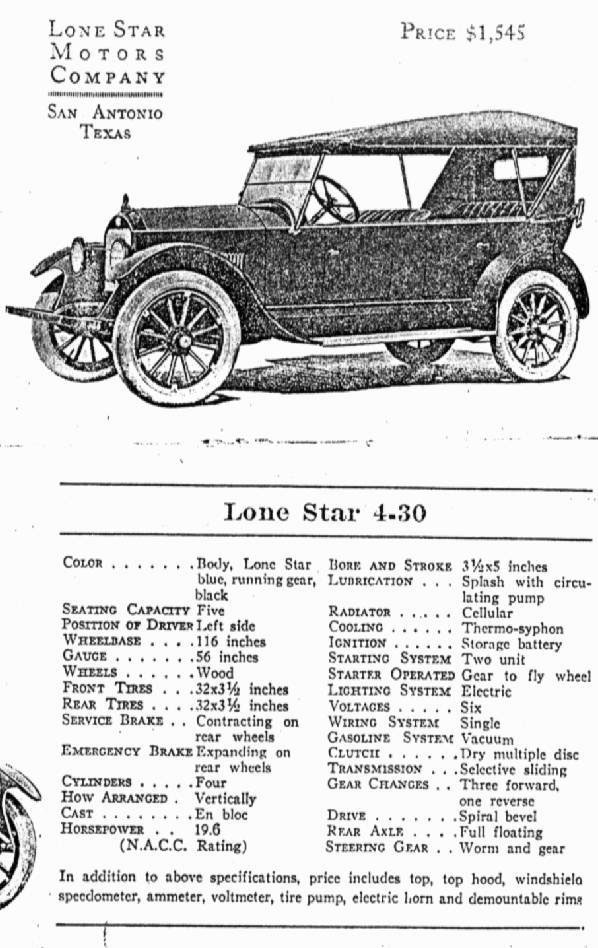
1921 Lone Star Advertising

The Lone Star was a passenger vehicle in production between 1919 and 1922. It was made by the Lone Star Motor Truck and Tractor Association, San Antonio, Texas.

== History ==
The Lone Star was available as the Beauty Four (Piedmont model 4-30) with a Lycoming engine or the Beauty Six (Piedmont Model 6-40) with a Continental engine. Both open and closed models were offered. The cars were manufactured for Lone Star by Piedmont Motor Car Company of Lynchburg, Virginia.

Advertisements listed the 4-30 model for sale at $1,545 (equivalent to $24,830 in 2025). Lone Star sales ended in 1922 when the Piedmont factory closed.
