= Chowrasta (Darjeeling) =

Historical public square in West Bengal, India

Coordinates: 27.0448°N 88.2677°E

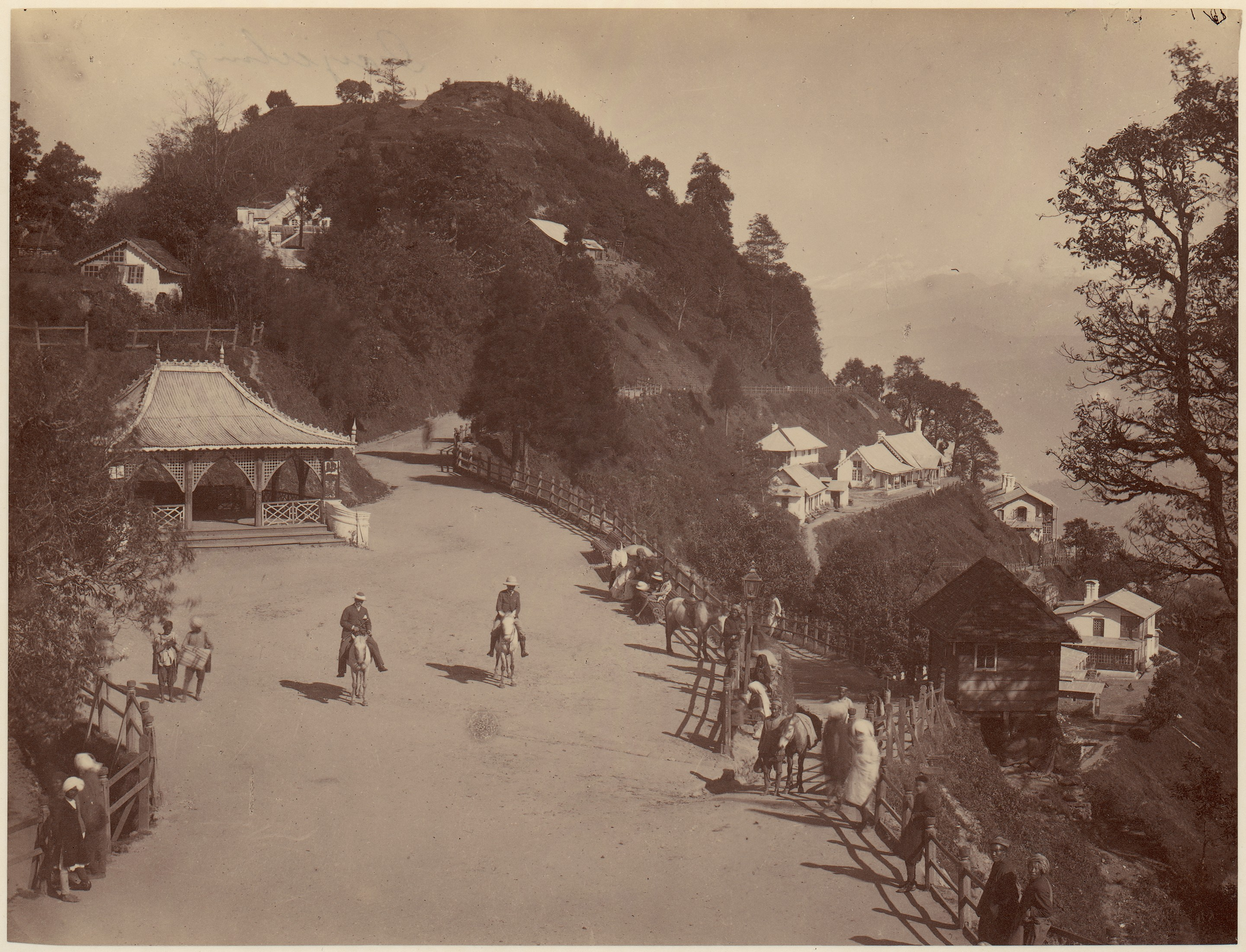
- Chowrasta (Band Stand), Darjeeling in 1880
- Interactive map of Chowrasta
- Former name: Band Stand
- Maintained by: Darjeeling Municipality
- Location: Darjeeling, West Bengal, India
- Postal code: 734101
- North: Sikkim
- East: Kalimpong, Bhutan
- South: Kurseong
- West: Nepal

Construction
- Completion: c. mid-18th century

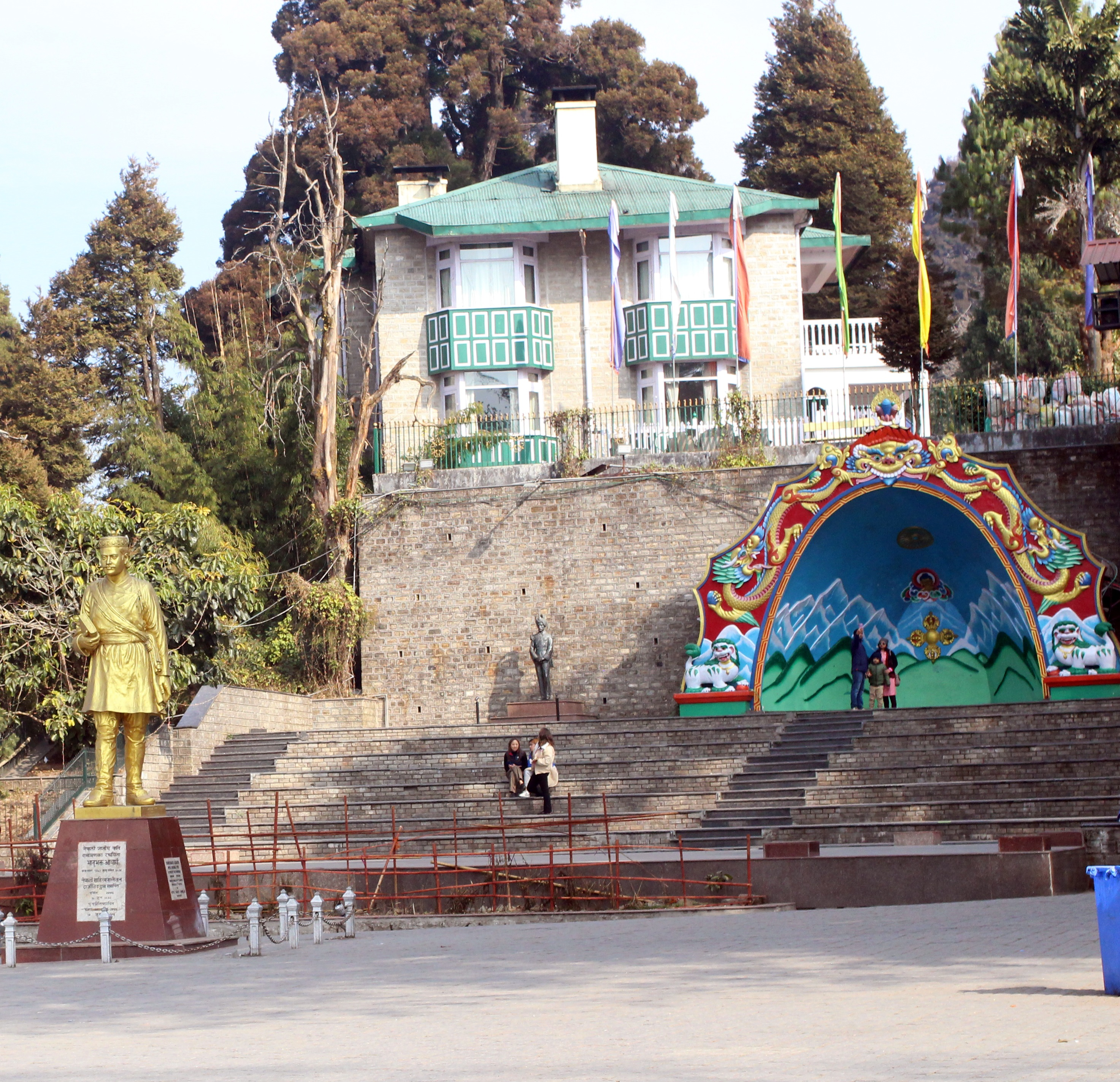
Darjeeling Chowrasta

Pronunciation of Chowrasta

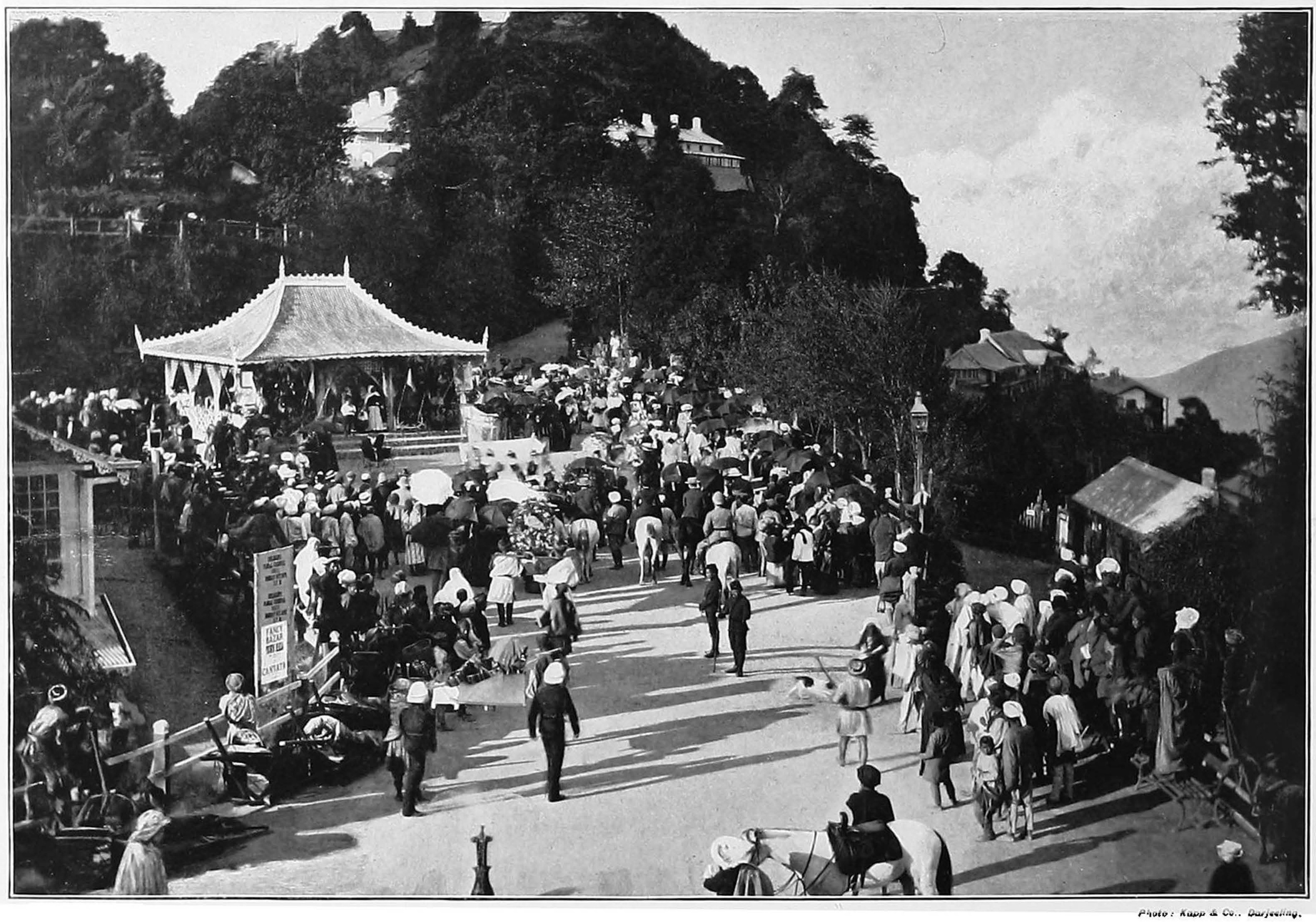
People assembling at Chowrasta, c. 1897–1899

Chowrasta "Intersection" lit. where four roads meet) is a historical public square in the Victorian era hill resort town of Darjeeling in the state of West Bengal, India. Located in the heart of the town it was the fashionable place of assembly for residents and visitors in the 18th century. Chowrasta is situated on the ridge of the Darjeeling hill range and is now a center of tourist attraction and a popular spot for the residents to assemble.

== Geography ==
Chowrasta is perched at an altitude of 2,134 metres (7,001 ft) and on a clear day, one can see Mount Kanchenjunga the third highest mountain in the world and twelve other peaks of the Himalayan Range, all which are above 20,000 feet (6,100 m). It came into being during the Victorian era in the mid 18th century owing to Darjeeling's cool climate, which was similar to that of London, the British established a hill station for its officials there.

The square is lined with old stores (the oldest being Oxford Book & Stationery); towards the west is are hills and to the east are valleys.

Although it is closed to all vehicles, Chowrasta is well connected to Darjeeling town and is at an accessible proximity from all parts of the Darjeeling hill range. Two main road arteries of the town, Nehru Road and Dr Zakir Hussain Road, culminate at Chowrasta and so do the two ends of Mall Road which winds around Observatory Hill and Mahakal Temple. Both ends of the Mall Road meet at Chowrasta from the north. There are few other narrow roads and footpaths which terminate and originate at Chowrasta.

== Social and tourist significance ==
Chowrasta is the social center of Darjeeling and witnesses many cultural and political activities throughout the year. A few coffee shops and restaurants have grown around it over the years. Activities available include pony rides along the Mall Road.

== Statues, monuments and developments ==
On the far North of the square stands a golden concrete statue of Nepali poet Shri Bhanubhakta Acharya. Initially, a 'bust above' statue of the Acharya was erected on 17 June 1949 and a full life sized figure was reinstalled on 13 July 1996, commissioned by the Nepali Sahitya Sammelan. In 2014 a park located behind the statue was developed into a stepped concrete platform for public events.

Immediately after the entrance from Nehru Road is a water fountain ornamented with concrete golden colored fishes and pelicans, however the fountain is nonoperational.

The Hawa Ghar (translation: wind house) is a permanent roofed concrete stage-like structure on the east edge of Chowrasta where cultural programs, performances and political speeches take place.

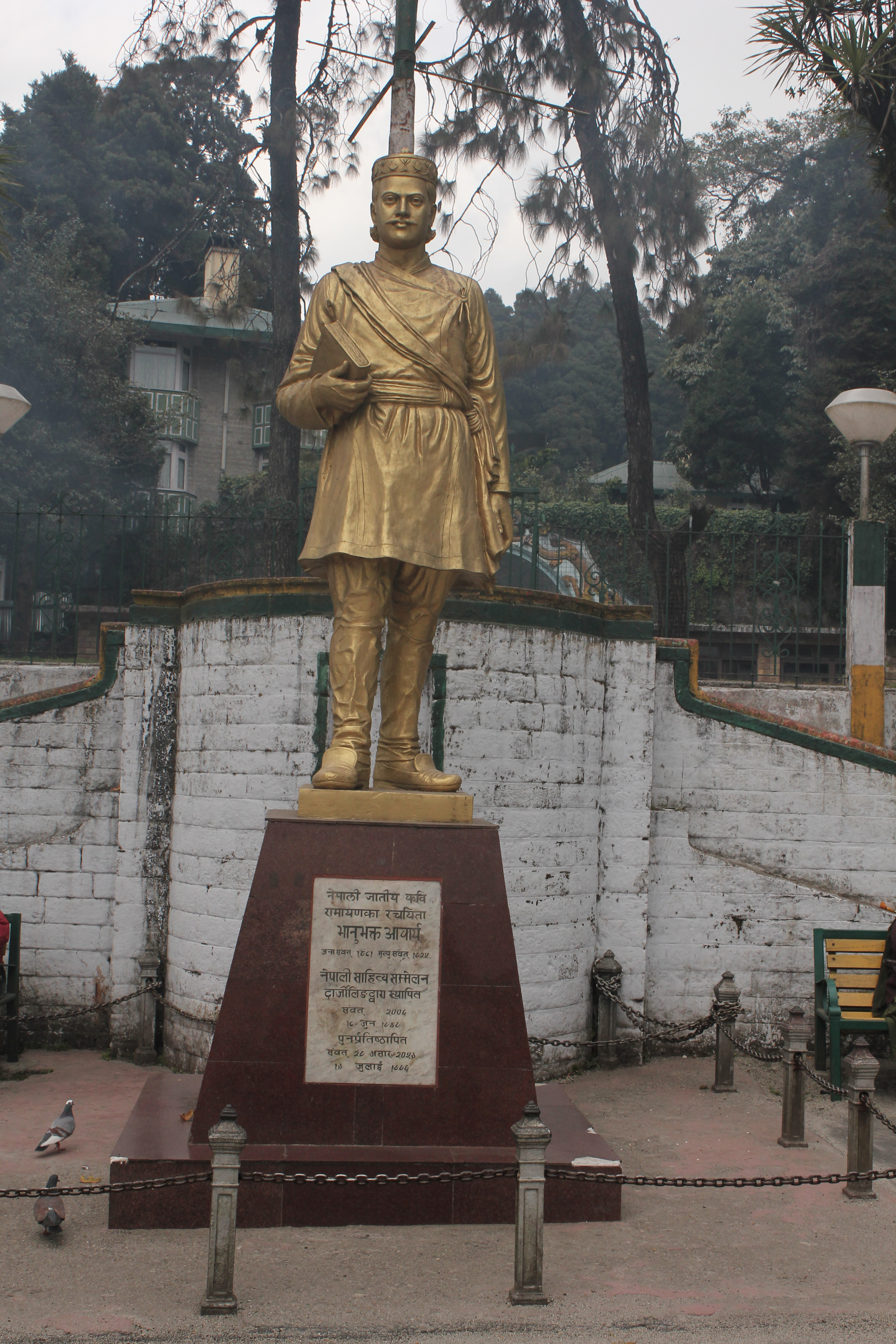
Bhanubhakta statue in Chowrasta

Chaurasta has a pigeon population and feeding them is a popular activity. Their droppings disfigure the Bhanubhakta statue and other stonework; the birds are not considered a health or public hazard.

== See also ==
- Mahakal Temple
- Darjeeling
- Observatory Hill, Darjeeling

== Gallery of pictures ==
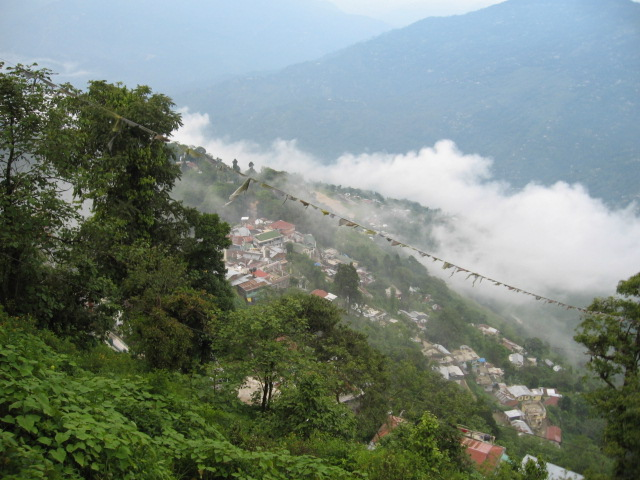
View from Mall Road

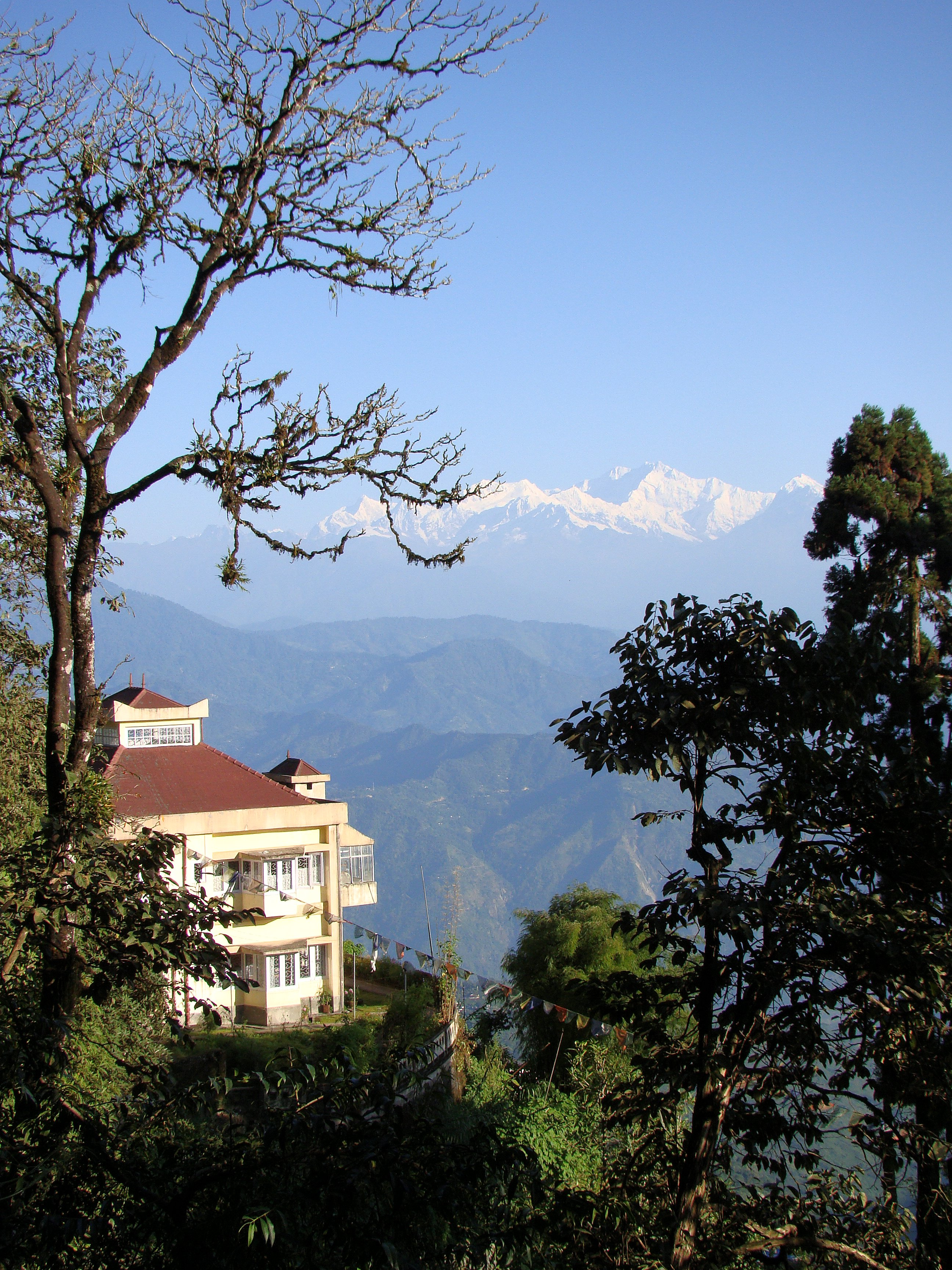
Kanchenjunga

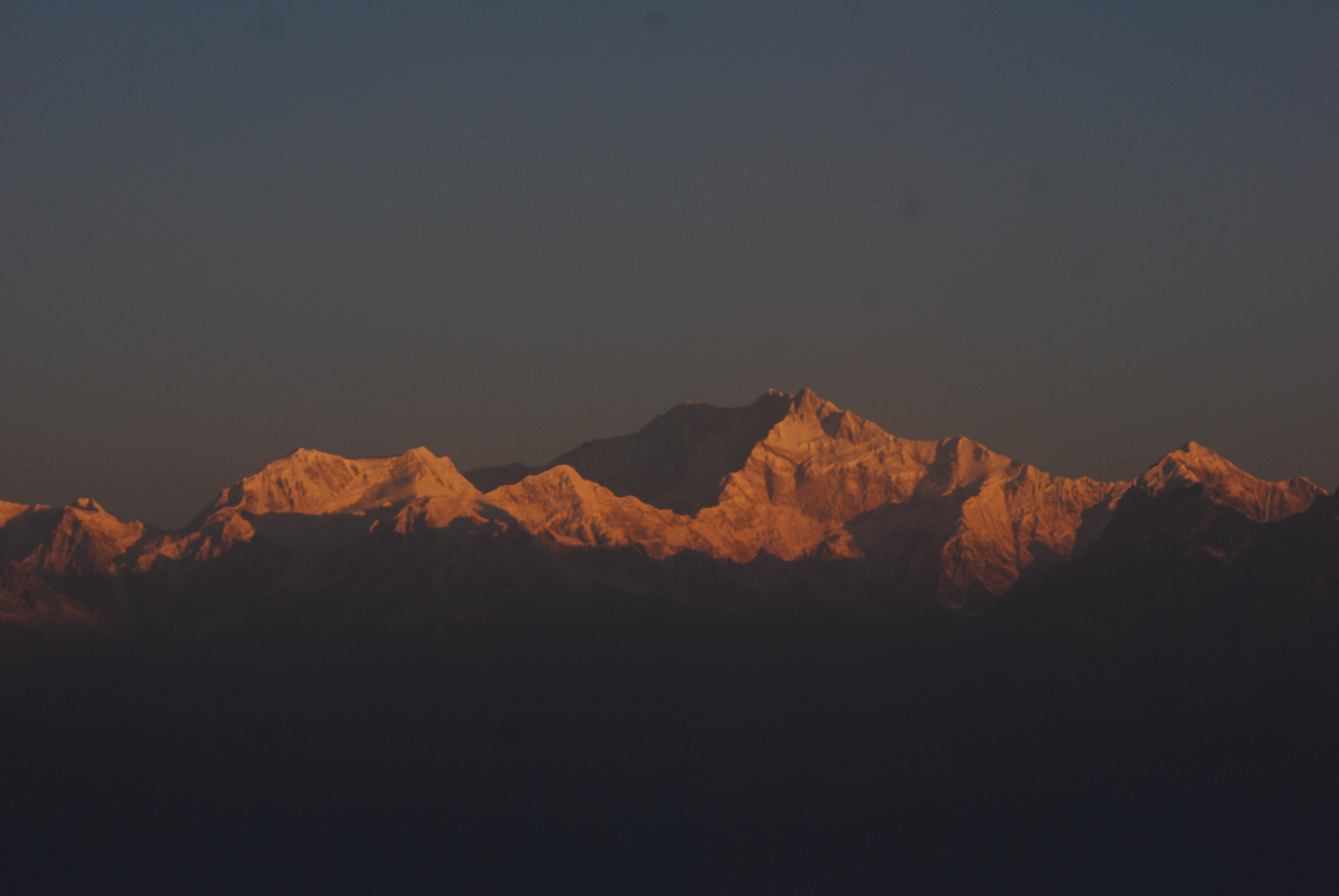
First light on Kanchenjunga

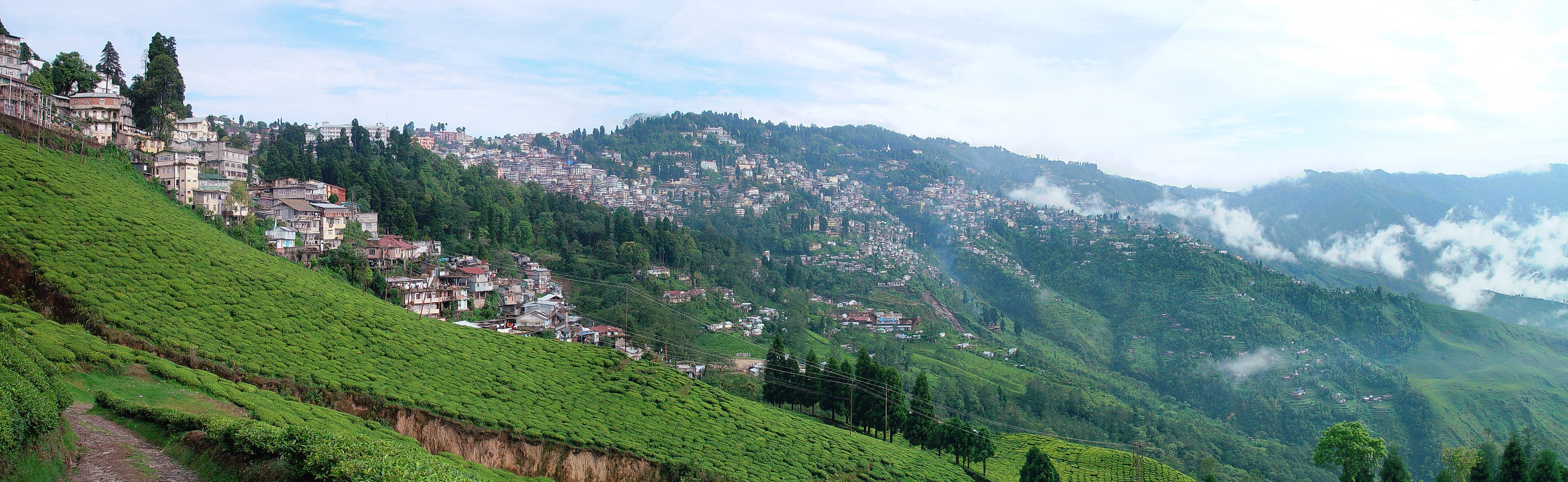
Darjeeling town

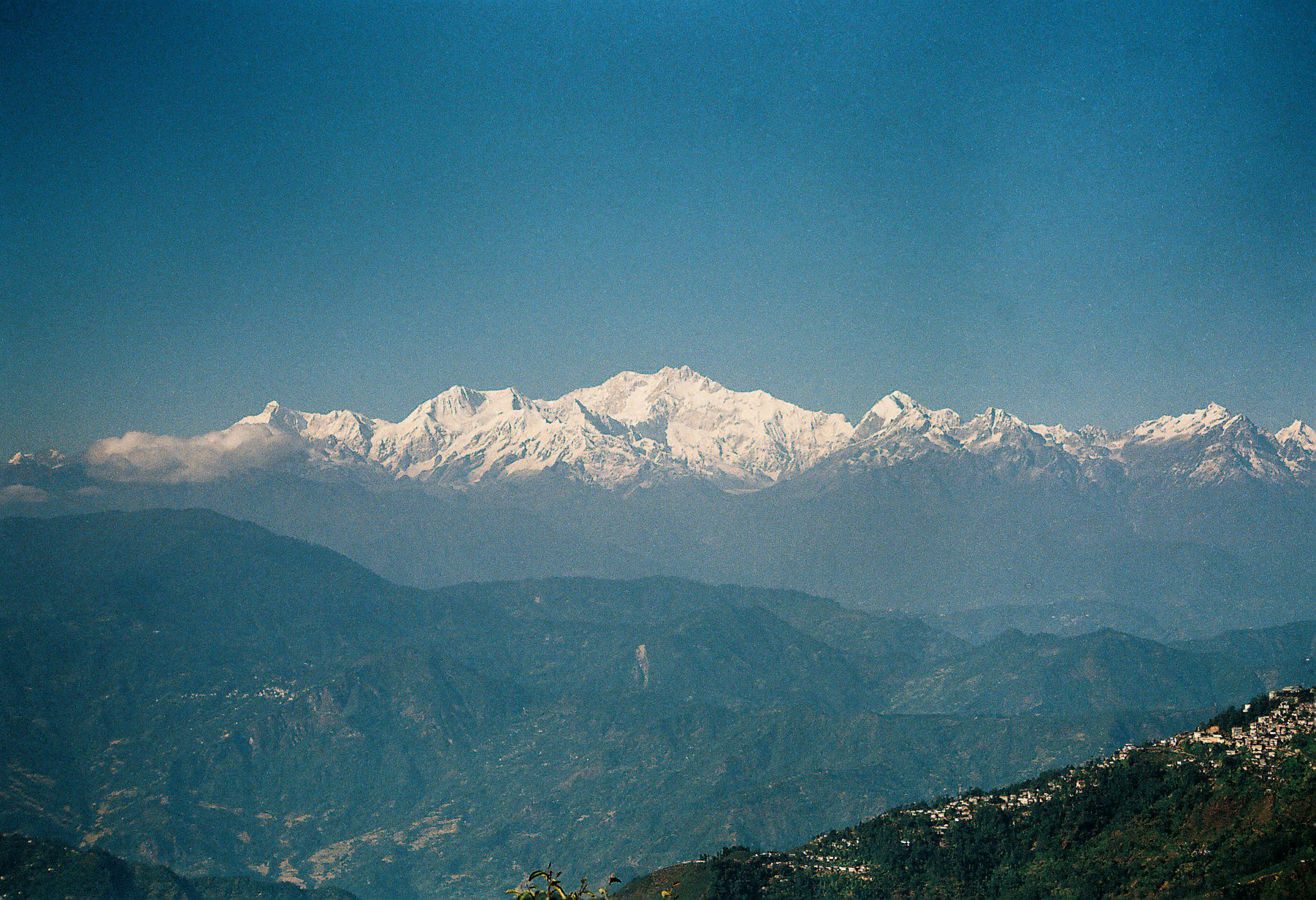
Mt. Kanchanjunga
