= Elkhart Motor Truck Company =

American automobile manufacturer

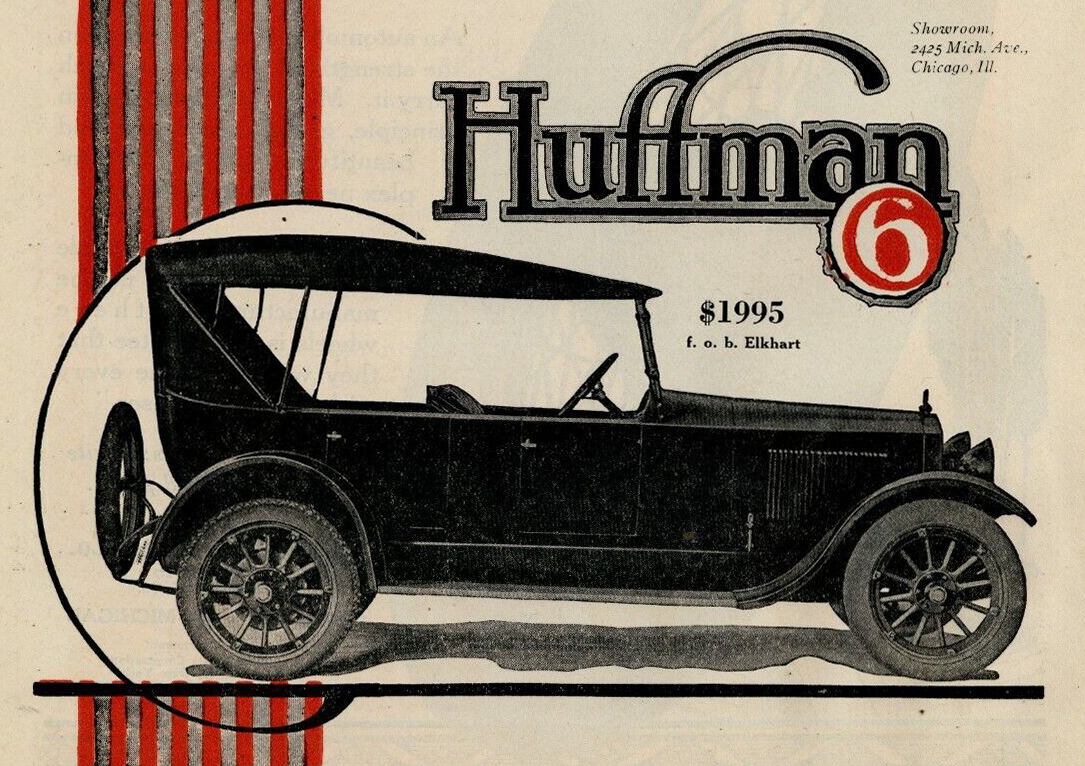
- The 1920 advertisement of the Huffman Six Model R car.
- Formerly: Valley Motor Truck Company (1926-1929); Huffman Brothers Motor Company (1918-1926)
- Industry: Automotive
- Founded: 1918
- Defunct: 1931
- Headquarters: Elkhart, Indiana, United States
- Area served: United States
- Key people: W. L. Huffman (president)
- Products: Automobiles

Elkhart Motor Truck Company, from 1926 to 1929 known as Valley Motor Truck Company, and from 1918 to 1926, as Huffman Brothers Motor Company, was a motor vehicle manufacturer based in Elkhart, Indiana, United States, that operated from 1918 to 1931. Until 1925, the company produced passenger cars. It also manufactured light trucks.

== History ==
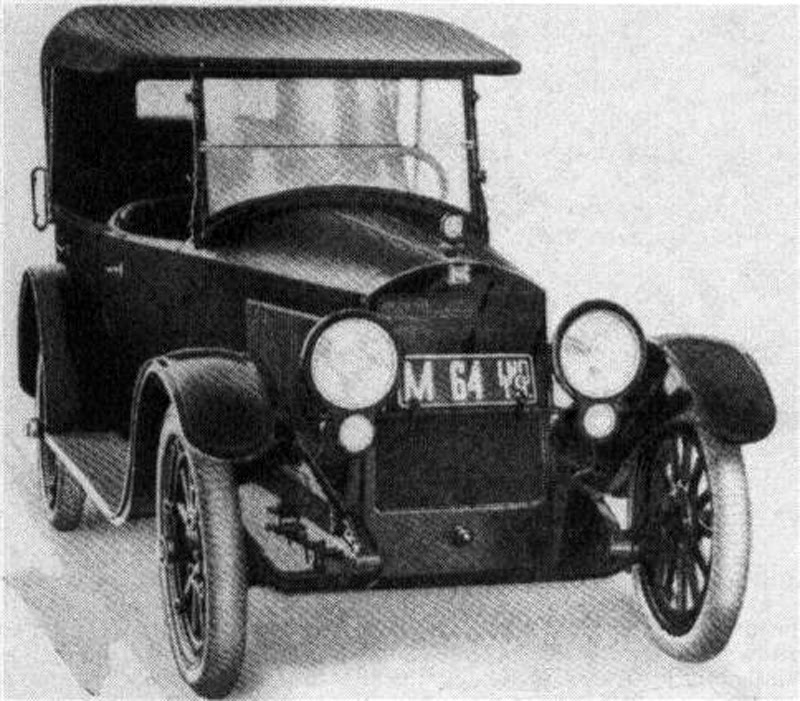
The Huffman Six car in 1921.

Huffman Brothers Motor Company was founded in 1918, in the town of Elkhart, Indiana, United States. It began manufacturing commercial vehicles between 1918 and 1919. In September 1919, the company announced the production of new models, under the brand name Huffman Six which were introduced in 1920. All cars manufactured by the company had a six-cylinder engine. In 1920, the company released the Model R, a touring car with five seats. It had an engine that produced 55 horsepower (41 KW), and its chassis had a wheelbase with a length of 305 cm (120 in). 187 units were manufactured. The company also manufactured the Huffman Truck, a light truck with the payload capacity between 907 kg (2000 lbs) and 2495 kg (5500 lbs). Its wheelbase had a length of 355.6 cm (140 in). From 1921 to 1922, the company manufactured the Model 7-R, which had the same specifications as its predecessor. 250 units were manufactured.

In the summer of 1920, in October 1921, and in April 1923, the company was in the state of insolvency, however, it survived each of those instances. In 1923, W. L. Huffman was the president of the company.

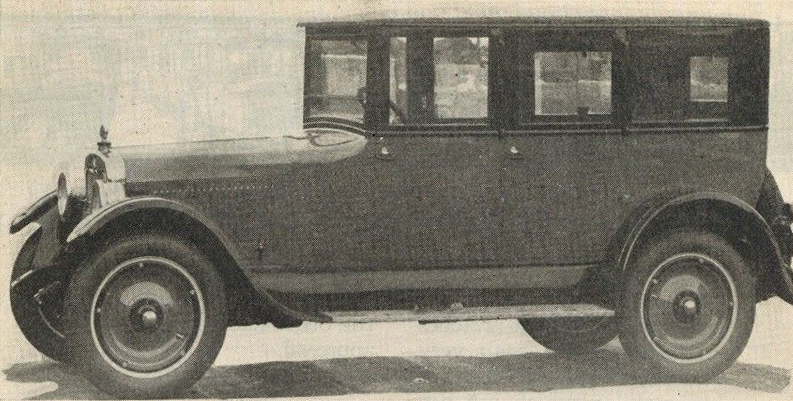
The 1925 Huffman Model L Artcraft sedan.

In 1923, the company manufactured Model K, with unchanged specifications. For the first time, aside from the five-seater touring car version, other configurations were introduced. They were: a two-seater roadster, five-seater sports touring car, and a seven-seater sedan. 103 units were manufactured. In 1925, the company manufactured the Model L. It had a six-cylinder engine with 50 horsepower (37.3 KW), and a chassis with the wheelbase with a length of 292 cm (115 ft). The car was available in the versions: five-seater phaeton, two-seater sports roadster, four-seater semi-sedan, three-seater coupe, and five-seater Artcraft sedan. 150 units were manufactured.

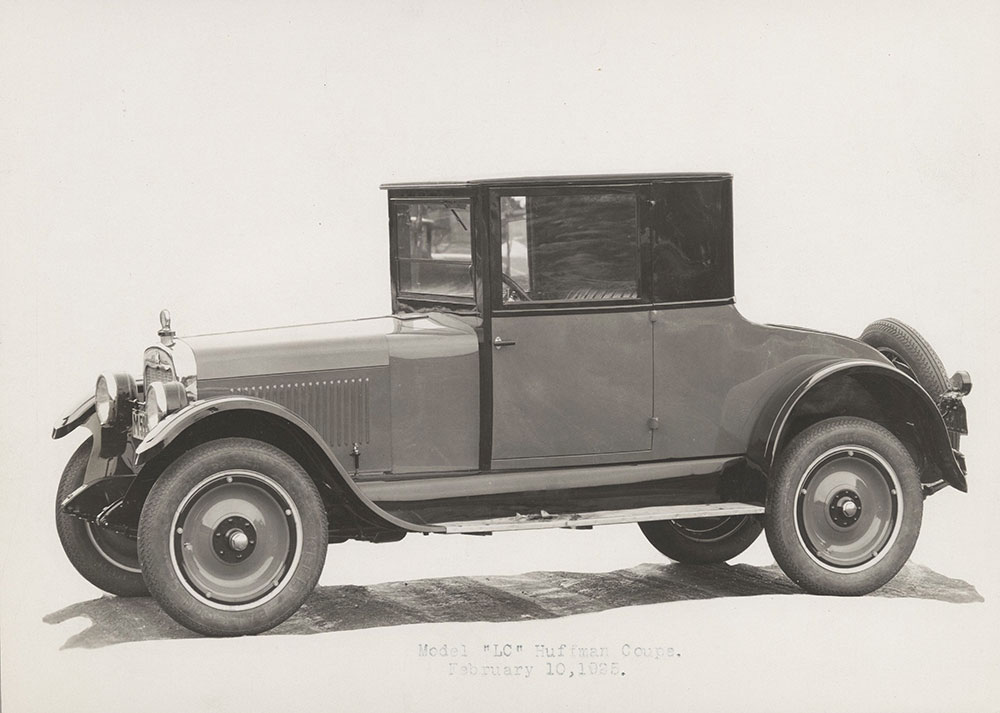
Huffman "LC" Coupe -1925

The company ceased manufacturing cars in 1925. In total, throughout its time of operation, it had manufactured 690 cars.

In June 1926, the company was renamed to Valley Motor Truck Company, and began using the brand name Valley. In 1929, it was again renamed Elkhart Motor Truck Company. The company was dissolved in 1931.

== Gallery ==
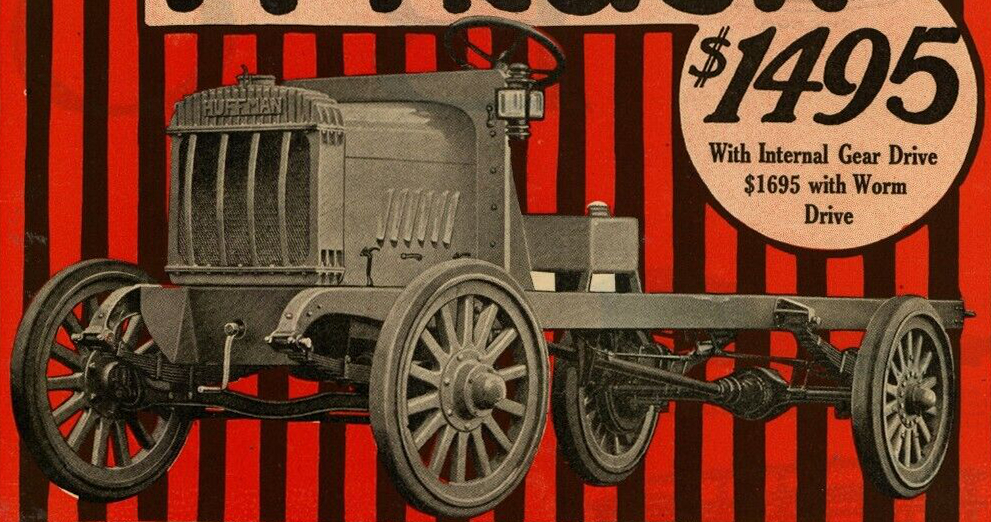
The chassis of the 1919 Huffman Truck.
