= Phur Tshering Lepcha =

Politician in Sikkim, India

Phur Tshering Lucksom (died 3 September 2021) who is popularly known as P. T. Lucksomis an Indian politician who served as first and only Deputy Chief Minister of Sikkim from 12 December 1994 to 21 July 1997 under Pawan Kumar Chamling, who is longest served chief minister in India. He than expelled from cabinet from 1997.

== NEBULA ==
NEBULA was a political party in the Indian state of Sikkim. NEBULA stands for Nepali Bhutia Lepcha, the three largest ethnic groups in the state.

NEBULA was founded in 1999 when the former Deputy Chief Minister of Sikkim, Phur Tshering Lucksom, was expelled from Sikkim Democratic Front. NEBULA joined the Sikkim United Democratic Alliance (SUDA) in 2004. Lucksom represented NEBULA in the ad-hoc committee of SUDA.

S.W. Laden La first coined the word "NeBuLa". He was also concerned with communal harmony among Nepali, Bhutia and Lepcha. Under the advice of concerned citizen of then Darjeeling, he was able to form a Union called Hill Peoples’ Social Union in 1934. Later the Union was famous for the motto "NeBuLa".

In 2013, NEBULA merged with Trinamool Congress and Lucksom becomes first president of state unit.

== See also ==
- Bhutia-Lepcha
