= Dhirdham Temple =

Replica of Pashupatinath temple of Kathmandu in India

- Dhirdham Temple
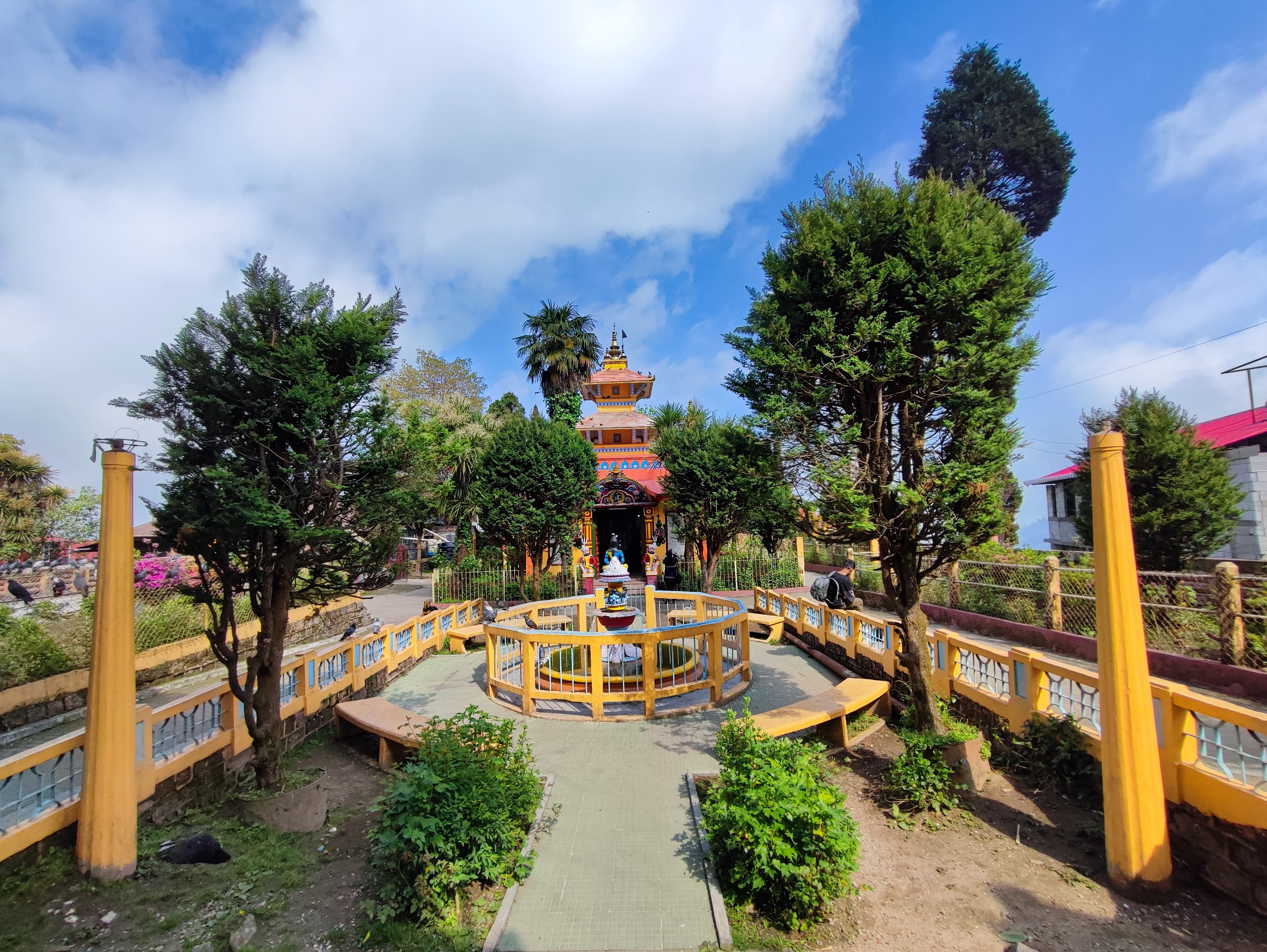
- A view of the temple

- Location in India

Religion
- Affiliation: Hinduism
- Deity: Shiva

Location
- Location: Darjeeling
- Country: India
- Interactive map of Dhirdham Temple
- Coordinates: 27.0375°N 88.25980°E

Dhirdham Temple is a Hindu temple located in Darjeeling, India. The temple was constructed in 1939 by Rai Saheb Purna Bahadur Pradhan from Nepal. The architectural design was done by Beg Raj Shakya and has a similar design to that of Pashupatinath Temple in Kathmandu.
