= Gerardine Botte =

Venezuelan-American chemist

Gerardine Gabriela Botte
- Born: Venezuela
- Education: University of Carabobo; University of South Carolina
- Scientific career
- Workplaces: Texas Tech University; Ohio University; University of Minnesota-Duluth
- Thesis: Thermal stability and modeling of lithium ion batteries (2000)

Gerardine "Gerri" Botte is a Venezuelan-American chemist who is a professor and the Whitacre Department Chair in Chemical Engineering at Texas Tech University. Her research considers electrochemical engineering and the development of sustainable manufacturing processes. Botte is editor-in-chief of the Journal of Applied Electrochemistry and a Fellow of the Electrochemical Society.

== Early life and education ==
Botte is from Venezuela. She studied chemical engineering at University of Carabobo. After graduating, Botte worked as process engineer in petrochemical plant. She moved to the United States for her graduate studies, starting her scientific career at the University of South Carolina. She earned her master's and doctoral degrees at the University of South Carolina, where she researched lithium-ion batteries. After graduating she was appointed to the University of Minnesota Duluth.

== Research and career ==
In 2002 Botte joined Ohio University, where she spent almost twenty years. At Ohio University, Botte founded the Center for Electrochemical Engineering Research (CEER), which she directed throughout her tenure at OU. The centre was supported by the National Institute of Standards and Technology. Botte is interested in the development of urea-based hydrogen fuel cells. She pioneered the electrolysis of urea in alkaline media, which can be used for several technologies including hydrogen production and wastewater remediation. The electrochemical processes developed by Botte involve the oxidation of urea to nitrogen and carbon dioxide at the anode of an electrochemical cell, with hydrogen evolution occurring at the cathode. As the electrochemical response is sensitive to the concentration of urea, such processes can be used to monitor urea concentration in clinical diagnostics and food science.

In 2019, Botte moved to Texas Tech University where she was made Whitacre Department Chair in Chemical Engineering.

== Awards and honors ==
- 2010 Elected Fellow of the World Technology Network
- 2012 Elected Fellow of the National Academy of Inventors
- 2014 Elected Fellow of the Electrochemical Society
- 2015 Science for Solving Society's Problems Challenge Winner
- 2017 Elected Vice President of the Electrochemical Society

== Selected publications ==
- Boggs, Bryan K.; King, Rebecca L.; Botte, Gerardine G. (2009). "Urea electrolysis: direct hydrogen production from urine". Chemical Communications (32): 4859–4861. doi:10.1039/b905974a. ISSN 1359-7345. PMID 19652805.
- Vitse, Frédéric; Cooper, Matt; Botte, Gerardine G. (2005-03-24). "On the use of ammonia electrolysis for hydrogen production". Journal of Power Sources. 142 (1): 18–26. Bibcode:2005JPS...142...18V. doi:10.1016/j.jpowsour.2004.09.043. ISSN 0378-7753.
- Botte, Gerardine G.; Subramanian, Venkat R.; White, Ralph E. (2000-05-03). "Mathematical modeling of secondary lithium batteries". Electrochimica Acta. 45 (15): 2595–2609. doi:10.1016/S0013-4686(00)00340-6. ISSN 0013-4686.
