= Sikkimese =

Sikkimese may refer to:

- Relating to the Indian state of Sikkim
- Sikkimese language, one of the Southern Tibetic languages
- Sikkimese people, the Indian peoples who inhabit the Indian state of Sikkim
- Native Sikkimese, the indigenous peoples of Sikkim

== See also ==
- Bhutia (disambiguation), a Tibetan ethnic group in Sikkim who speak Sikkimese
