= Bhutia (surname) =

Bhutia is a Tibetan surname that may refer to

- Bhaichung Bhutia (born 1976), Indian football player
- Kunzang Bhutia (born 1994), Indian football goalkeeper
- Lako Phuti Bhutia (born 1994), Indian football player
- Nadong Bhutia (born 1993), Indian football player
- Samten Bhutia, Indian film director and writer
- Sonam Bhutia (born 1994), Indian football midfielder
- Thupden Bhutia (born 1987), Indian football player
