= Ging Gompa =

Monastery in Darjeeling, India

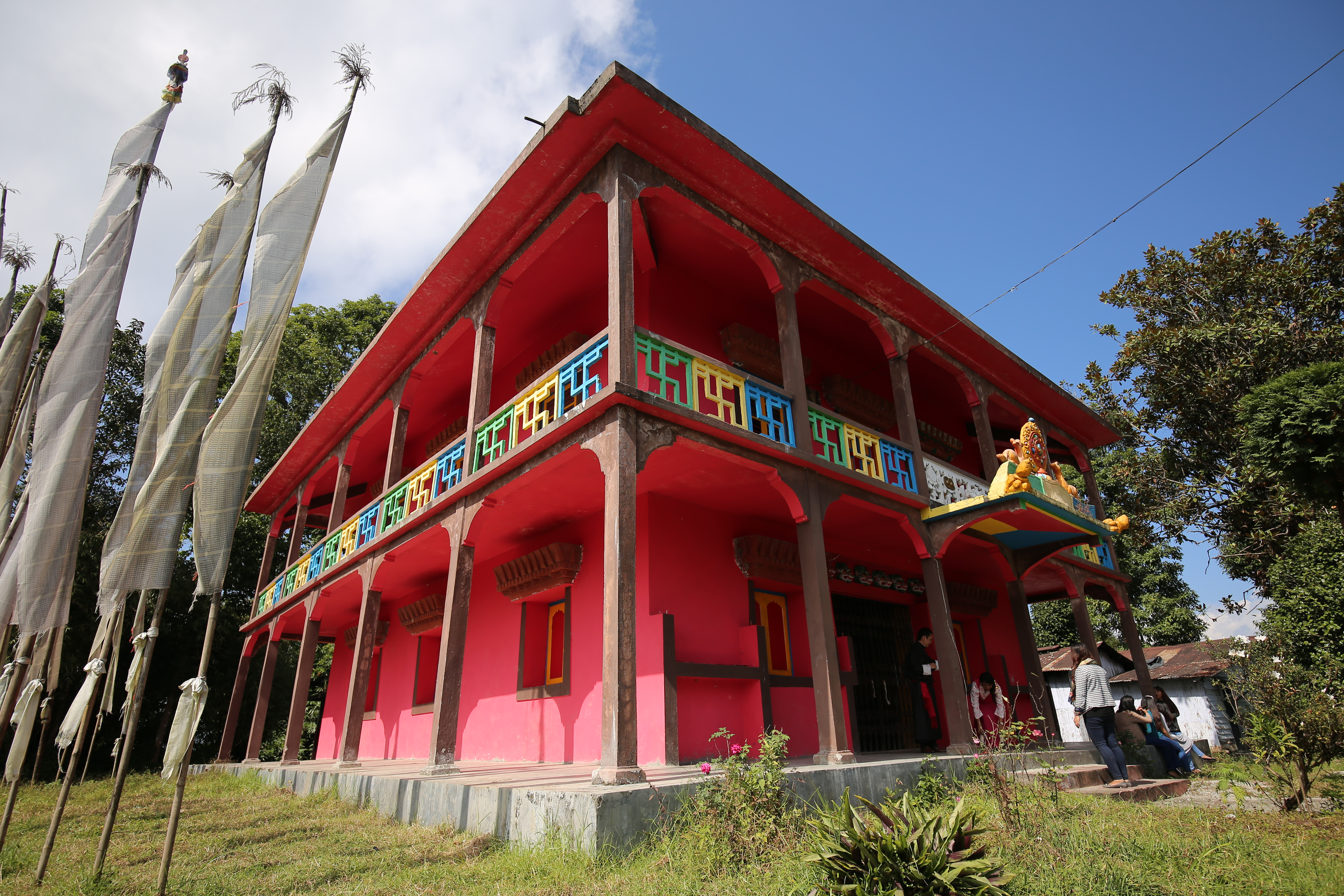
- Ging Gompa

- Location within Darjeeling region

Religion
- Affiliation: Tibetan Buddhism
- Sect: Nyingmapa

Location
- Location: Darjeeling, India
- Country: India
- Coordinates: 27°04′43″N 88°17′10″E

Architecture
- Established: 1818; 208 years ago

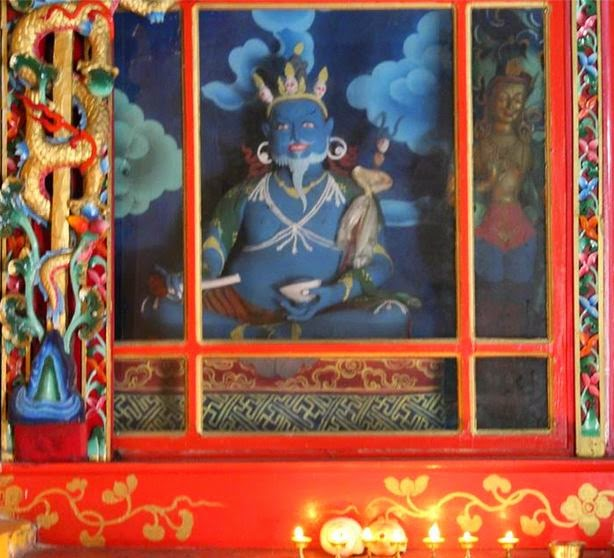
Idol of Gyalwa-Lat-chen-chenpo as seen in Ging Monastery, Darjeeling

Ging Gompa (also known as Sangchen Thongdrol Ling) (Tibetan: གསང་ཆེན་མཐོང་གྲོལ་གླིང) is a Buddhist monastery in Darjeeling, West Bengal, India. The monastery is located in Ging, about 10 km (6.2 mi) from Darjeeling. It is one of the oldest monasteries in Darjeeling and subscribes to the Nyingmapa tradition of Tibetan Buddhism. On historical grounds, the monastery is still under the administrative control of the Government of Sikkim.

== Gyalwa Lhatsun Chenpo ==
The monastery contains an image of the patron saint of Denjong, Gyalwa Lhatsün Namkha Jikmé (1597-1653). He was the one who finally institutionalized the bond of brotherhood between the Lhopas and the Monpa people that had been sworn at an oath-taking ceremony at Kabi Longstok in north Sikkim sometime in the 13th century. In 1642, he unified the country and established the Namgyal Dynasty. He also established the first and the oldest monastery in the history of Sikkim, Dupde Gonpa, in the year 1701 at Yuksum.

The principal abode of Sikkim is Gang Chen Zod Nga who was entrusted as the guardian God of Denzong by Guru Padmasambhāva. The mountain Khanchanzonga was named for the god. It literally means "the five repositories of the ledges of the great snow". Lhatsun Chenpo revealed the "Denzong Lamyig" of Padmasambhāva, which describes and explains "the five repositories".

== History ==
Colonel Mainwaring mentions a Lepcha community of about one hundred people in the present Gymkhana Club area and in a Bhutia settlement including a monastery on a hill somewhere around 1765. The Royal History of Sikkim, however, asserts that the establishment of such a monastery must be earlier than 1765. According to the authors of the Sikkimese Court, the monastery was a branch of Pemayangtse belonging to the Nyingma school of Tibetan Buddhism. Wangdu Dorje Ling (dbang 'dus rdo rje gling) was the name of the site. The monastery was desecrated and destroyed somewhere around 1788 when Gurkha troops invaded the land and took control. In 1817 the invading Gurkha army was driven out by the British East India Company during the Anglo-Nepalese War and the territory was returned to the Raja of Sikkim in the hopes of gaining a trade route to Tibet in exchange.

After Darjeeling was handed back to Sikkim, the Buddhist monks returned to Sikkim in 1818 and the Lamas from Pemayangtse established Sangchen Thongdrol Ling (later called Gying) Gompa. It was initially built (or re-built) in 1818 at the western slope below the observatory hill (present location of Gorkha Rang Manch Bhavan). In 1835 Darjeeling was loaned to the British by the Raja of Sikkim to establish a sanatorium. After the British settled in Darjeeling they laid the foundation stone of the St. Andrew's Church in 1843 just above the Sangchen Thongdrol Ling (Ging) Gompa. The church was damaged in an earthquake and was re-built in 1873. It is believed that the British found the sound of the morning and evening rituals of the monastery annoying and hence decided to cause the monastery to shift to a new location with the excuse that the area would be developed into a secular public park. Hence, around 1879, Sangchen Thongdrol Ling Gompa was relocated to Gying, thus clearing the space and establishing the Victoria Pleasance Park (presently Gorkha Rang Manch Bhavan) in its place. This chain of events would seem to suggest that the original monastery on top of observatory hill, later destroyed by the invading Gurkha army, was rebuilt at the Gorkha Rang Manch Bhavan location in 1818 by the lamas of Pemayangtse and finally relocated to Ging in 1879 on being insisted by the British rulers. This hypothesis has also been suggested by Deki and Nicholas Rhodes in their book A Man of the Frontier: S. W. Laden La (1876-1936): His Life and Times in Darjeeling and Tibet. However, presently, as far as popular belief goes the Gompa originally built on the observatory hill is thought to be the Bhutia Busty Monastery (belonging to the Karma Kagyu Sect) which is also popularly famed as the oldest monastery in Darjeeling.

The Venerable S. Mahinda was a Buddhist monk and a poet in Sri Lanka who was originally from Sikkim. After Sri Lanka gained independence in 1948, he was acknowledged as a national hero given his patriotic poems and other works of literature. Some Sri Lankan sources, specially the more celebratory treatises to S. Mahinda, mention that his father was the head monk of the Bhutia Busty Monastery in Darjeeling. This remains unsubstantiated, but subsequent Sri Lankan references tease out details which suggest that S. Mahinda’s family must have been associated with the monastery at Ging in Darjeeling instead. These narratives of S. Mahinda’s early life contend that his father was a monk driven to despair when his monastery was moved away from its original location in Darjeeling (Where the Gorkha Rangmanch at the end of Mall, below St Andrew’s Church, stands now in Darjeeling) on the complaint of British residents, specially the nearby church, that the ‘noise’ of prayers at the monastery disturbed the ‘tranquillity’ of the area. This was the reason why the Sangchen Thong Delling Monastery is said to have been relocated to Ging in 1879 (This is when the new site was allotted to the monastery for relocation. Some sources mention that the monastery itself was completed only in 1898). More commonly known as the Ging Monastery, this is a branch of the Pemayangtse Monastery, and since the Shalngo family shares its bloodline with the royal family of Sikkim, they would have been more closely associated with the Ging Monastery. This, incidentally, is also the area where Kazi Dawa Samdup grew up. As for the Sri Lankan invocation of this episode, one must bear in mind that the Lankan freedom struggle was essentially mounted as a confrontation to the Christian missionary work underway in the island; the chance to flesh out a Buddhist-Christian conflict in faraway Darjeeling in the life of the most celebrated national hero would be too tempting to pass up, especially since most of the write- ups on S. Mahinda even in Sri Lankan mainstream media continue to be written by Theravada monks.

== Management and appointment of Head Lama ==
The monastery was looked after by the Darber of Sikkim. As per the Darber's notification No. 464/J dated 1933 the control of the monasteries at Ging and Bhutia Busty in Darjeeling were entrusted to the Judicial Secretary of the Darber which is now carried out by The Ecclesiastical Affairs Department. The appointment of head lama was also regulated to be deputed from Pemayangtse monastery. The last head monk, Phutuk Bhutia, was also appointed by the Pemayangtse Monastery. The Sikkim government sanctioned a monthly remuneration of Rs 6,000 to run the monastery and Rs 5,000 for the upkeep of the student monks. After his death on January 25, 2011, no incumbent was appointed to fill up the vacancy. The monastery is left to run itself and with it an important part of the history of Sikkim and Darjeeling as well. Moreover, over 19 acres of land that originally belonged to the monastery have been drastically reduced due to the numerous encroachments. The September 2011 earthquake damaged the old structures of the monastery. However, with a grant of funds from the Ecclesiastical Affairs Department of Sikkim there has been renovation work carried out.

The late head lama of the monastery was quoted in The Telegraph newspaper as having heard from his elders that Gying Monastery was re-built sometime in 1818, at a place where the present Gorkha Rang Manch Bhavan is situated. He said that the monastery had to be shifted from such a prominent location in 1879 as the British residing in the area were said to be disturbed by the blowing of conch shells and the loud sounds of the Lhabha and Gyaling in the early hours of the morning and the evening.

Recently Yap Lopon Yeshey Dorjee was appointed as the head monk of Ging Gompa by the Department of Ecclesiastical Affairs, Government of Sikkim. He has worked as a resident teacher of Lhatsun Dharma Centre, Rabongla, Sikkim, and is officially initiated by Kyabji Yangthang Rinpoche on Domang Tersar Choed. He formally took the charge of the head monk of Ging Monastery on 24 October 2021.
