= Alsace (automobile) =

Former motor vehicle manufacturer of the United States

The Alsace was an American automobile manufactured by Piedmont between 1920 and 1921 for Automotive Products Co. of New York, made with right-hand drive for export purposes.

The car differed from other Piedmont products chiefly because it used a Rolls-Royce-shaped radiator. It had a wheelbase of 116 inches (2,946 mm) and employed a 3.1 litre four-cylinder Herschell-Spillman engine.
