= Bhutani =

Bhutani may refer to:

- Bhutani tribe, a clan of the Soomra tribe of Pakistan
- Bhutani language, a misnomer for several languages:
  - Bhotia language or Sherpa language
  - Bhutia language or Sikkimese language
  - apparently also a certain dialect of the Balochi language
- Bhutani Pony, a breed of pony

== People with the name ==
- Mohammad Saleh, Pakistani politician
- Mohammad Aslam Bhutani (born 1960), Pakistani politician
- Rishi Bhutani (born 1980), Indian actor

== See also ==
- Buttani, a minor planet (see the search results for relevant articles)
- Bhutanese (disambiguation)
- Bhoti (disambiguation)
