= Der Elsässer Bote =

Newspaper

- Type: Daily newspaper
- Editor-in-chief: Dr. Haenggy
- Founded: 1928
- Ceased publication: 1940
- Political alignment: APNA
- Language: German language
- Circulation: 18,000 (1930)

Der Elsässer Bote ('The Alsatian Messenger') was a German-language daily newspaper in Alsace, France. Der Elsässer Bote was the organ of the pro-French Catholic party APNA, and was launched in 1928 with financial support from the French state. Dr. Haenggy served as the editor-in-chief of Der Elsässer Bote. As of 1930, Der Elsässer Bote had the largest circulation of all party-affiliated daily newspapers in Bas-Rhin, with a daily circulation of around 18,000. It ceased publication in 1940.
