= Bhutia Busty =

Town in Darjeeling Municipality, Bengal, India

Bhutia Busty is a small town located at Darjeeling Municipality area in West Bengal. The famous Bhutia Busty Monastery is also located at this place. It belongs to the Red Sect of Tibetan Buddhist Lamas.
