= Red ant chutney =

Traditional Indian condiment

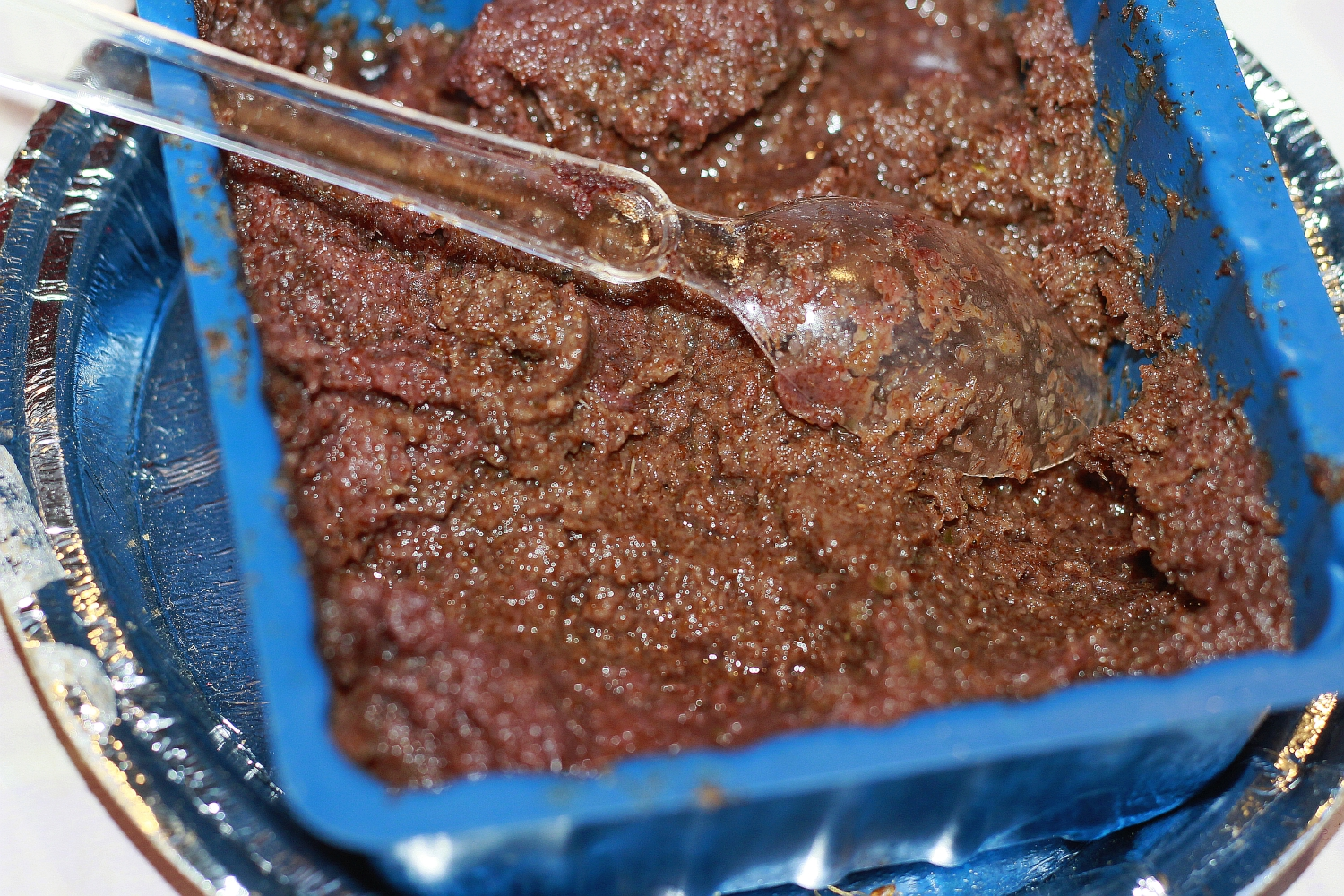
- Chhapra Chutney made from Red Ant, a food of Baster region of Chhattisgarh at Aadi Mahotsav
- Alternative names: Kai Chutney, Chapura Chutney, Chhapra Chutney, Hao Rit
- Type: Chutney
- Course: Condiment
- Place of origin: India
- Region or state: Eastern and Northeastern India
- Associated cuisine: Tribal cuisine, Jharkhandi cuisine, Chhattisgarhi cuisine, Cuisine of Odisha, Cuisine of West Bengal
- Main ingredients: Red weaver ants (Oecophylla smaragdina) and their eggs
- Ingredients generally used: Salt, ginger, garlic, and chilies

Red ant chutney, also called Kai Chutney, Hao Rit, Chapura, Chapda Chutney or Chhapra Chutney, is a traditional condiment from tribal communities in Chhattisgarh, Jharkhand, Odisha and West Bengal, India. It is made from red weaver ants (Oecophylla smaragdina) and their eggs, providing a distinct taste along with reported nutritional and medicinal qualities. On January 2, 2024, it was awarded a geographical indication (GI) tag to odisha, recognizing its distinct regional origin.

== Preparation ==
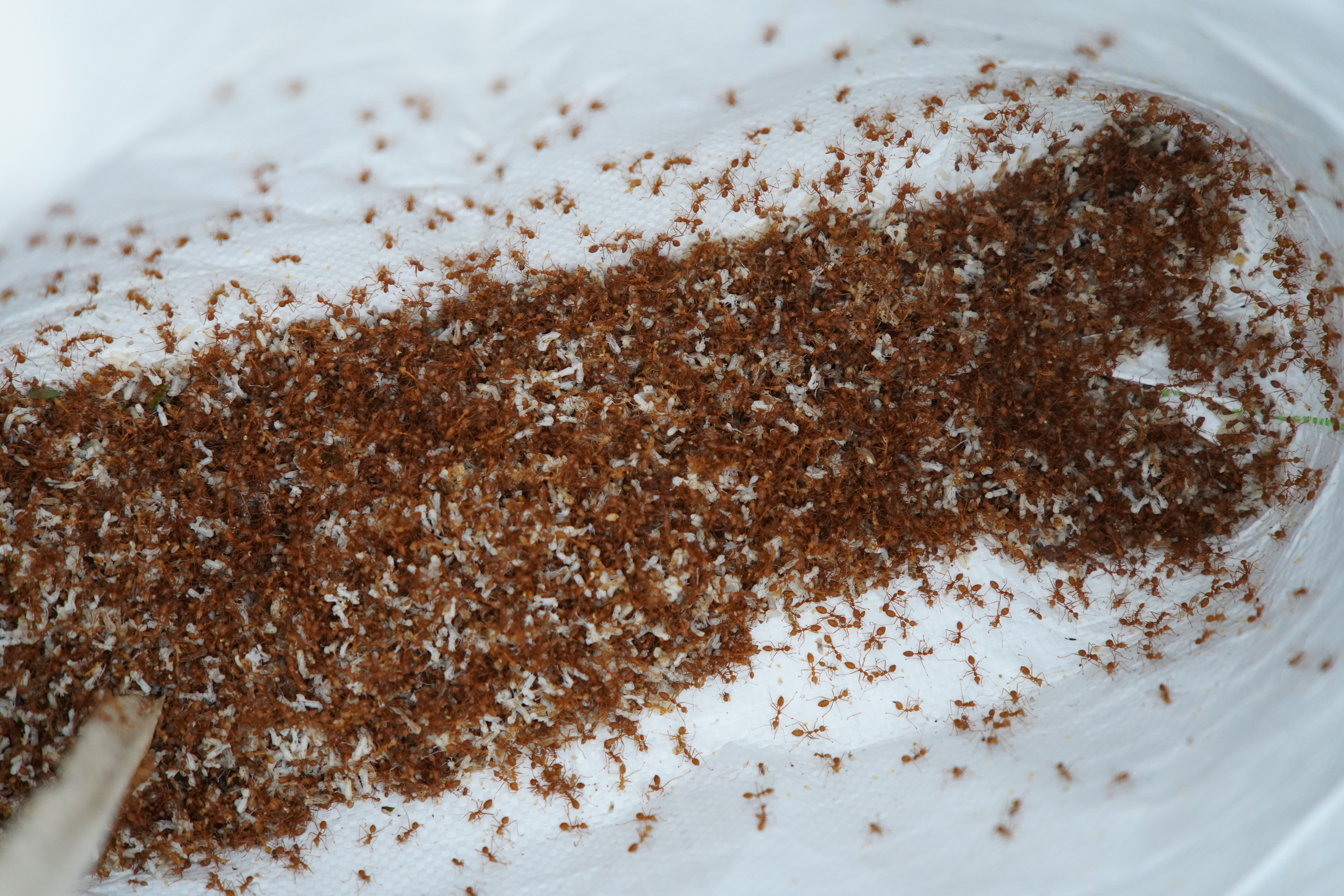
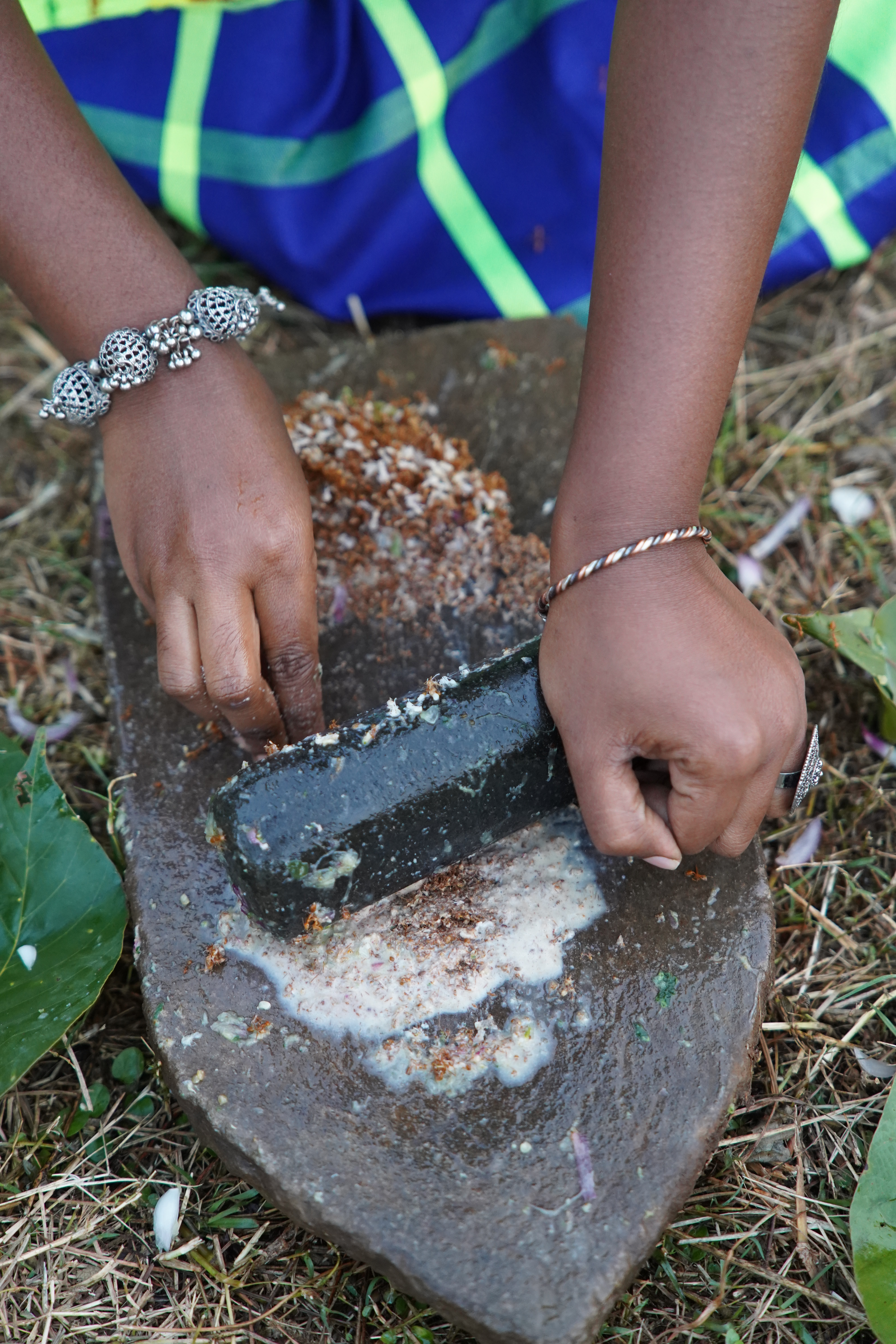
From Traditional Santal Food Mela in Birbhum, West Bengal, collected red ants and their eggs, (left) and Grinding red ants and their eggs (right).

Red ant chutney is prepared by collecting red weaver ants and their eggs, commonly found in the forests of eastern India. After being cleaned, the ants are ground into a paste with salt, garlic, ginger, and chilies. This mixture is occasionally sun-dried for preservation and later used as a flavoring for curries and other dishes.

== Overview ==
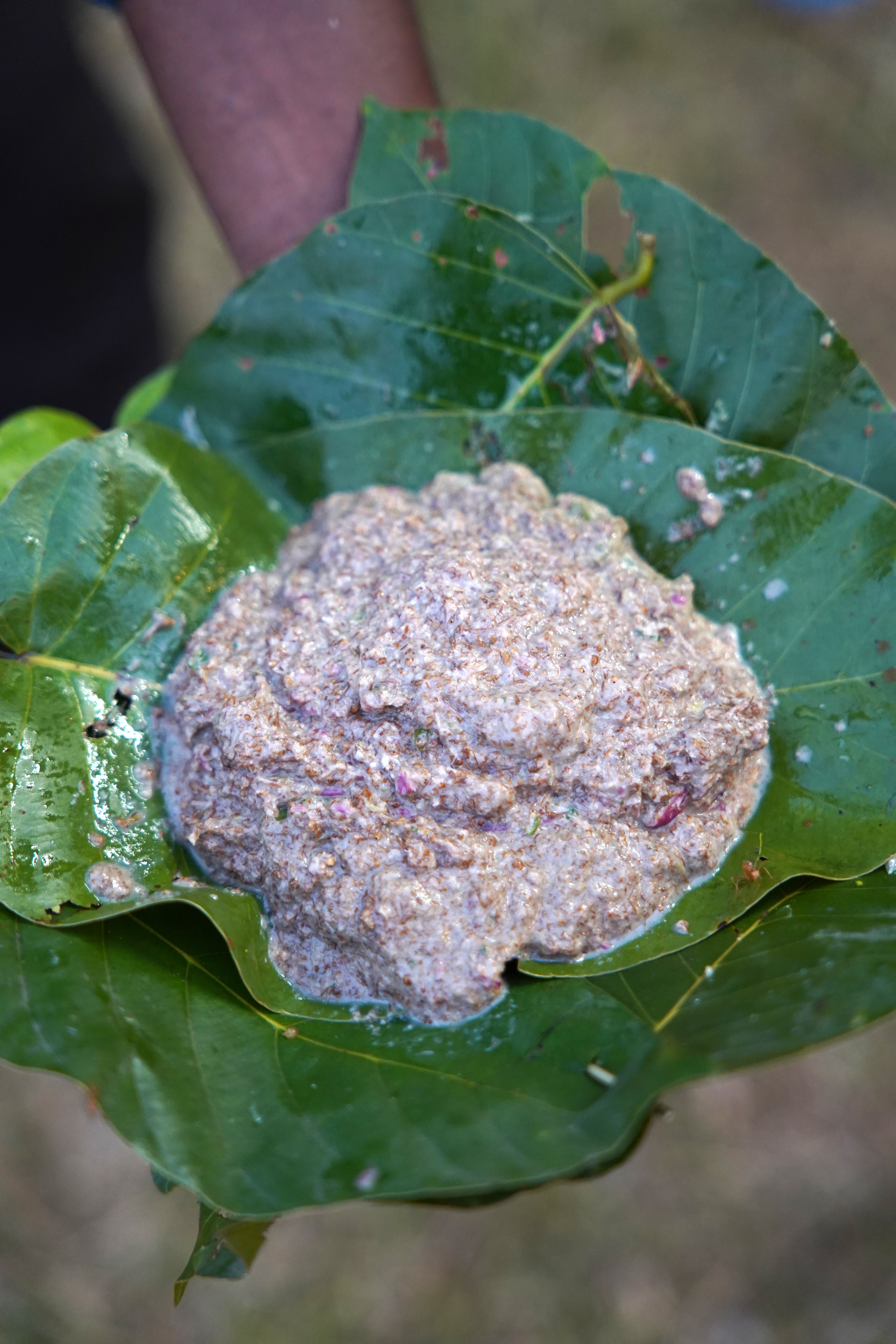
Red ant eggs chutney or Hao Rit from the Traditional Santal Food Mela in Birbhum, West Bengal.

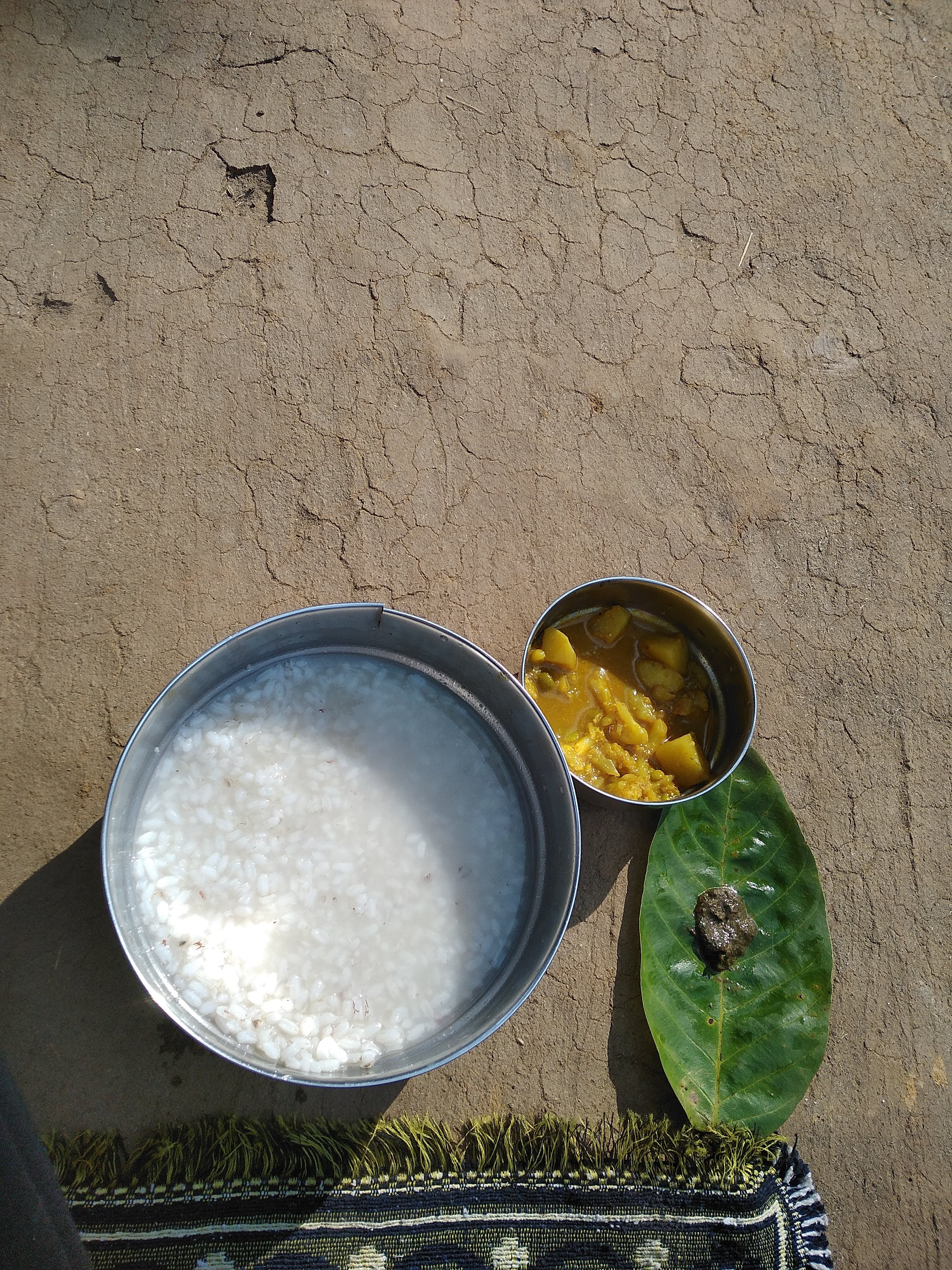
Red Ant chutney served with soaked rice (known as daka among the Santali people) in a Santali home in Dulki village, Jhargram district, West Bengal.

The chutney holds economic and cultural value for many tribal families who gather and sell red ants as a livelihood. It is a source of protein, calcium, vitamin B-12, iron, and other nutrients, and is traditionally believed to support brain and nervous system health. The chutney has been part of the diet of tribal communities in eastern and northeastern India for centuries.

Tribal people from Odisha's Mayurbhanj district are seeking for a Geographical Indication (GI) tag for this delicacy

Chef Gordon Ramsay has included red ant chutney on his menu. In 2010, during his documentary on Indian cuisine, Gordon Ramsay referred to Chapda chutney (Red Ant Chutney) as the world's best chutney and acknowledged the health benefits of the dishes he sampled, including red ant chutney.

== See also ==
- List of chutneys
- Chhattisgarhi cuisine
- Jharkhandi cuisine
