= Jharkhandi cuisine =

Culinary traditions of Jharkhand, India

Location map of the Indian state of Jharkhand

Jharkhandi cuisine is the cuisine of the Indian state of Jharkhand. Staple foods are rice, dal, roti, and vegetables. Common meals often consist of vegetables that are cooked in various ways, such as curried, fried, roasted and boiled. Many traditional dishes of Jharkhand may not be available at restaurants.

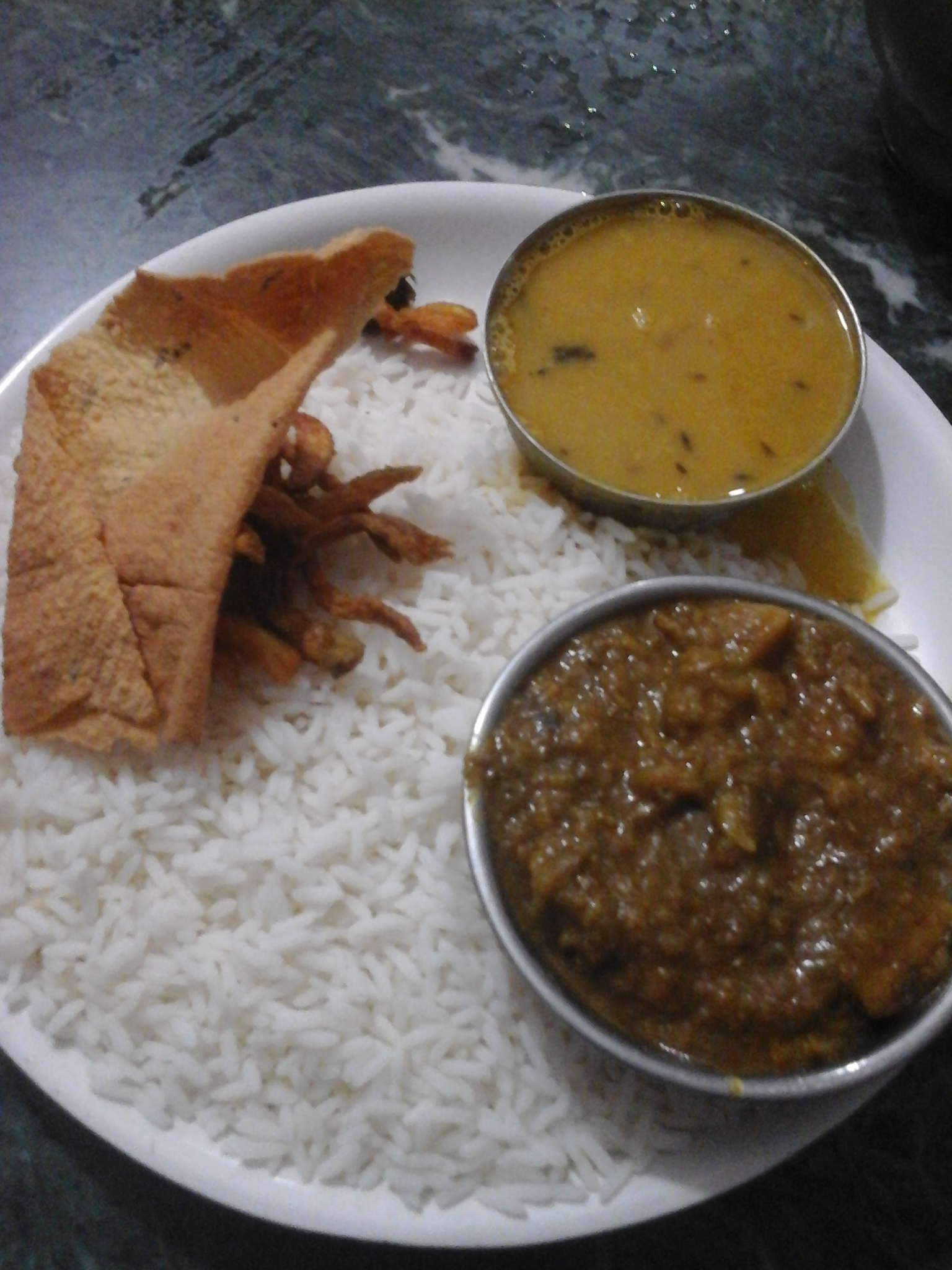
A Jharkhandi rice plate

== Foods and dishes ==
- Malpua: A dish usually prepared during the Holi festival.
- Arsa roti: A sweet dish prepared during festivals. Rice flour and sugar or jaggery are used in preparation.
- Chhilka roti: Bread prepared by using rice flour and dal. It is served with chutney, vegetables and meat.

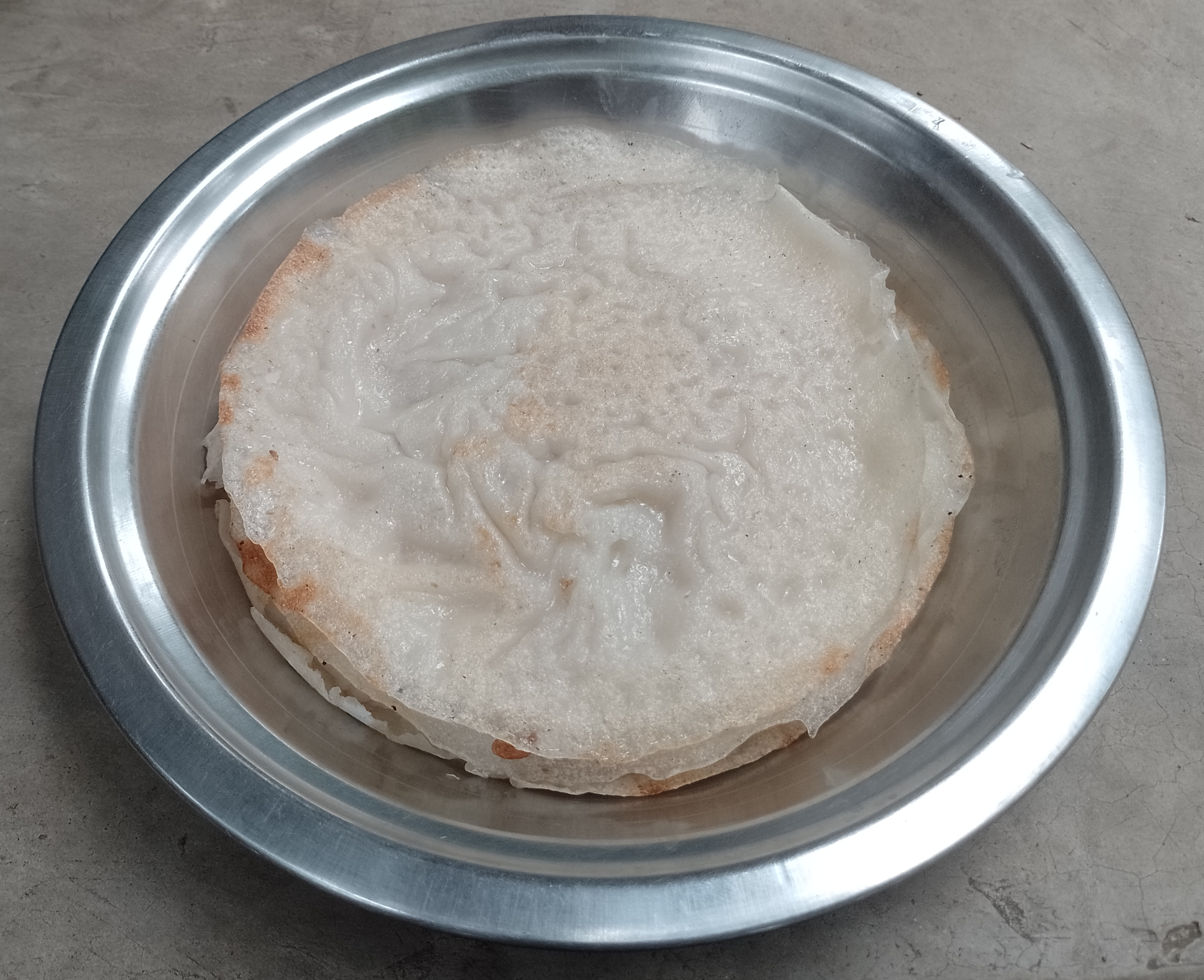
Chhilka roti

- Dhooska or dhuska: Deep fried rice flour pancakes that may be served with gram curry and potatoes.

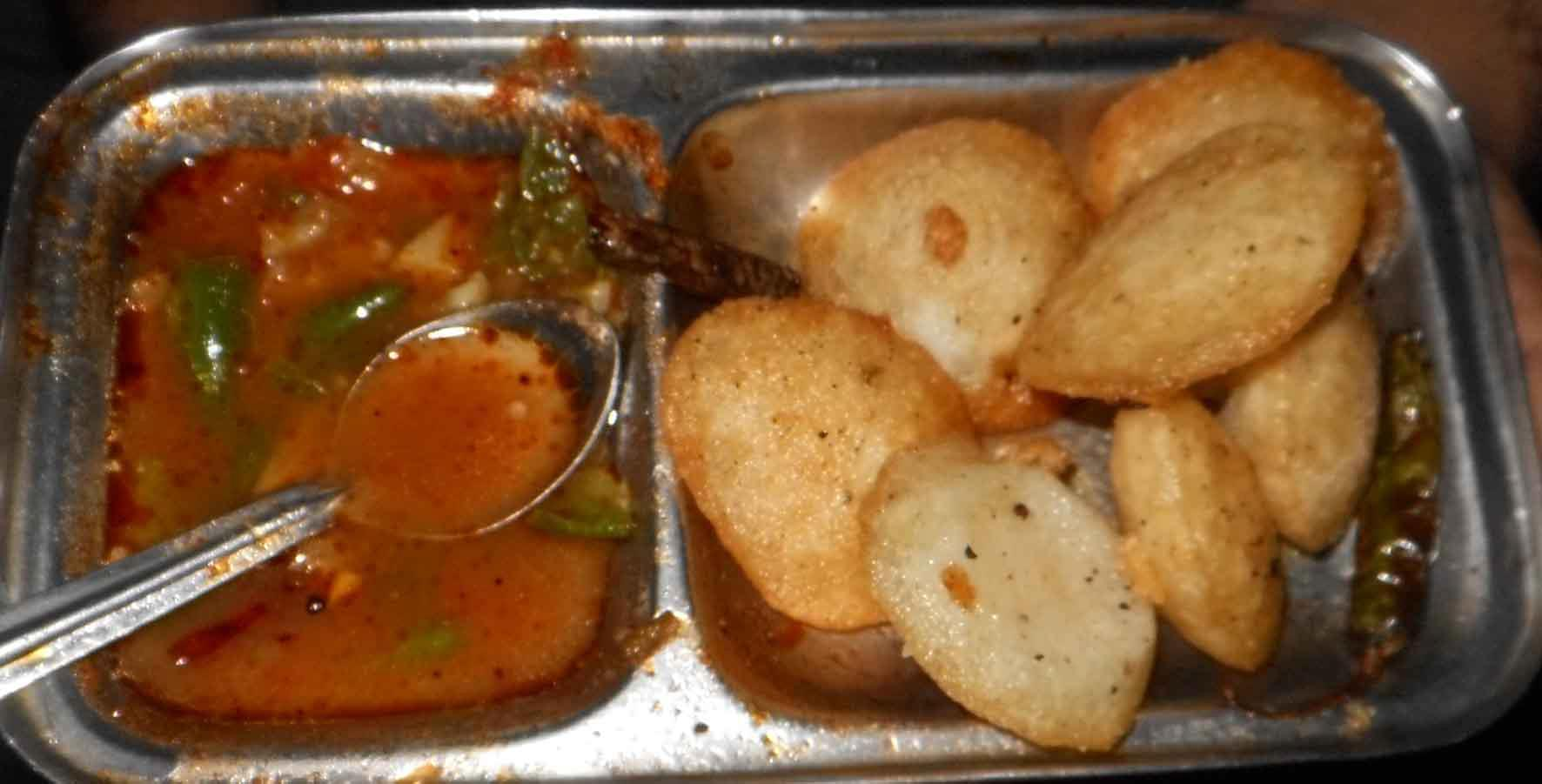
A platter of dhuska

- Aaru ki sabzi: Made with a root vegetable found in Jharkhand only.
- Chakor jhol: A wild edible leafy vegetable, cooked in red rice soup.
- Sanai ka phool ka bharta: A rural recipe made of Sanai (Crotalaria juncea) flowers.
- Moonj ada: A spicy dal, cooked over a low flame with a dash of lemon and chilli for flavour.
- Dumbu: A rice dessert.
- Tilkut: A sweet prepared with pounded sesame-seed cookies made with jaggery batter or melted sugar.
- Maduwa khassi: Smoked mutton with the skin intact and served with rice.
- Spicy chicken: A common meat dish.
- Rohad haku: Fish which are dried in the sun and then stir fried in oil with lemon and vinegar.
- Phutka or Rugra (A type of Mushroom): Rugra or puttu is a type of edible mushroom which grows during the monsoon season and is used for vegetable.
- Bamboo shoots: Bamboo shoots are used as vegetables in Jharkhand.
- Red ant chutney: A dish of mashed red ants and their eggs.
- Koinar saag: Leaves of the koinar tree (Bauhinia variegata) are eaten as a vegetable.
- Putkal ka saag: a sautéed leafy vegetable.
- Pitha: Rice flour with urad or chana dal.

== Alcoholic beverages ==
- Handia: Handia or Handi is a common rice beer in Jharkhand. People drink it during festivals and marriage feast.
- Mahua daru: An alcoholic beverage in Jharkhand which is prepared using the flowers of the mahua tree (Madhuca longifolia).
