= Dhooska =

Snack from Jharkhand, India

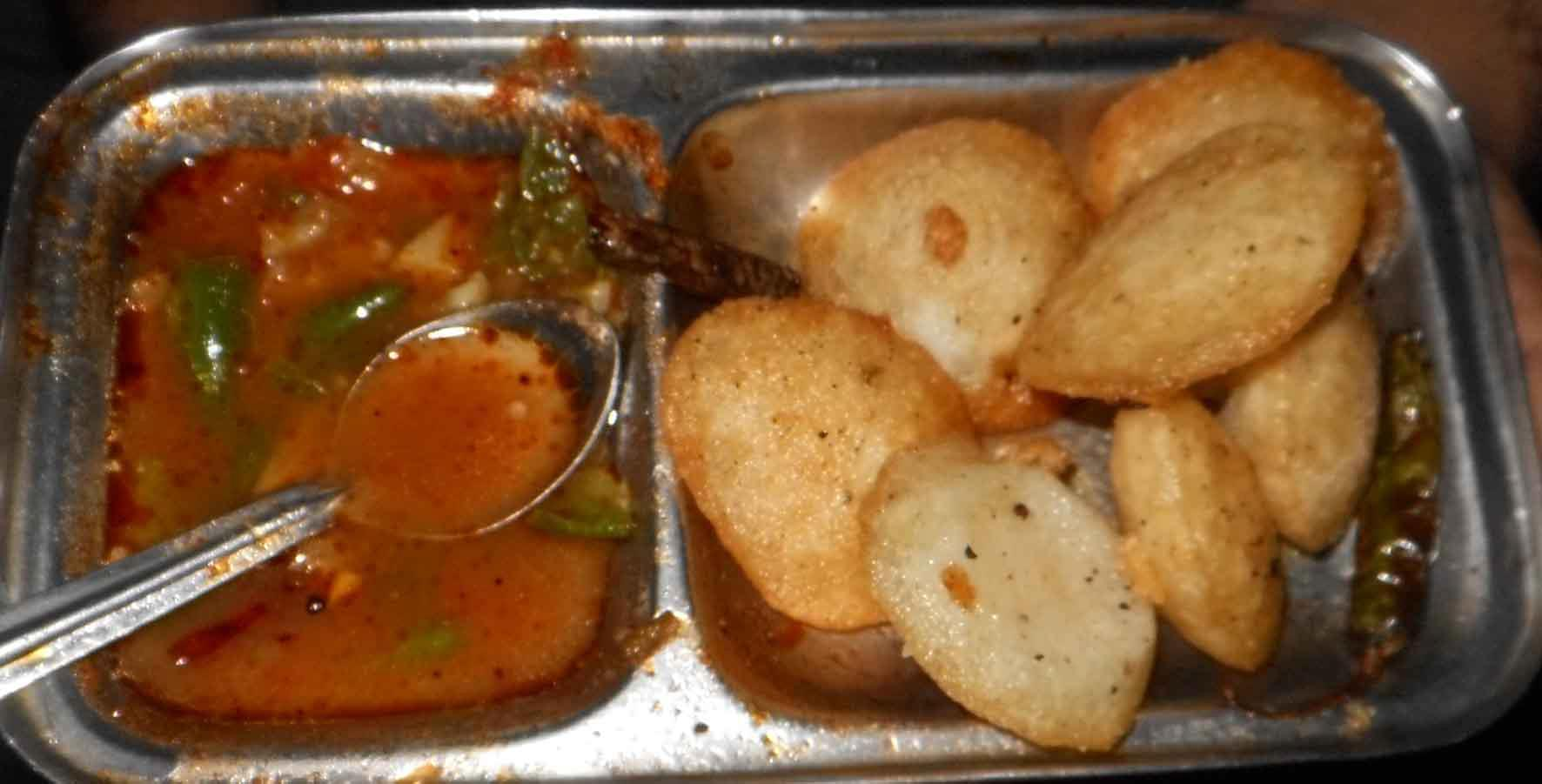
A platter of Dhuska

Dhooska or Dhuska is a popular deep-fried snack eaten all over Jharkhand, India. The dish is one of the delicacies of Jharkhandi cuisine. The main ingredients in this savoury fried bread dish are powdered rice, powdered chana dal. The bread is then deep fried. It is often served with any sauce or chutney. Dhooska is mostly made in market-area stalls where people enjoy it as a snack and is rarely found in larger restaurants.

== See also ==
- Chhilka roti
- Pitha
