= West Bengal cuisine =

Culinary traditions of West Bengal, India

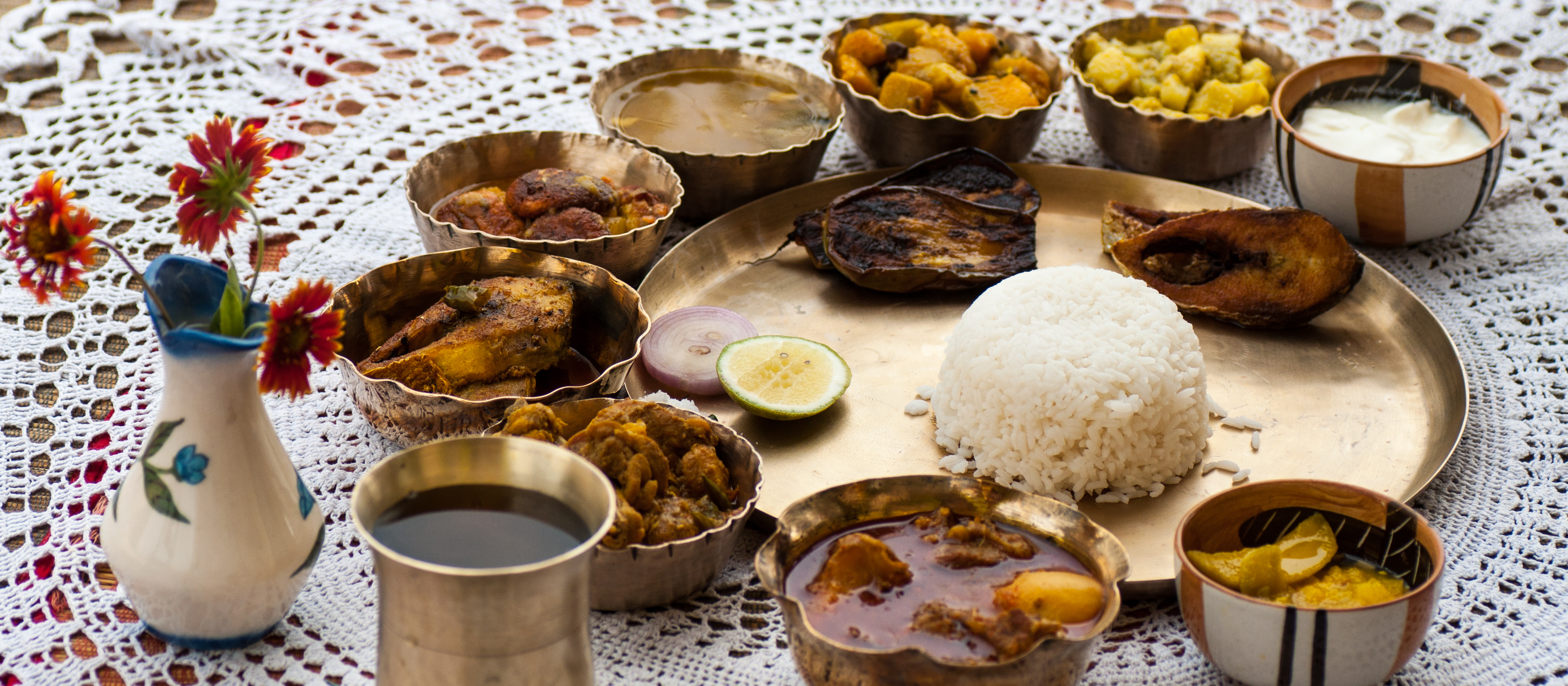
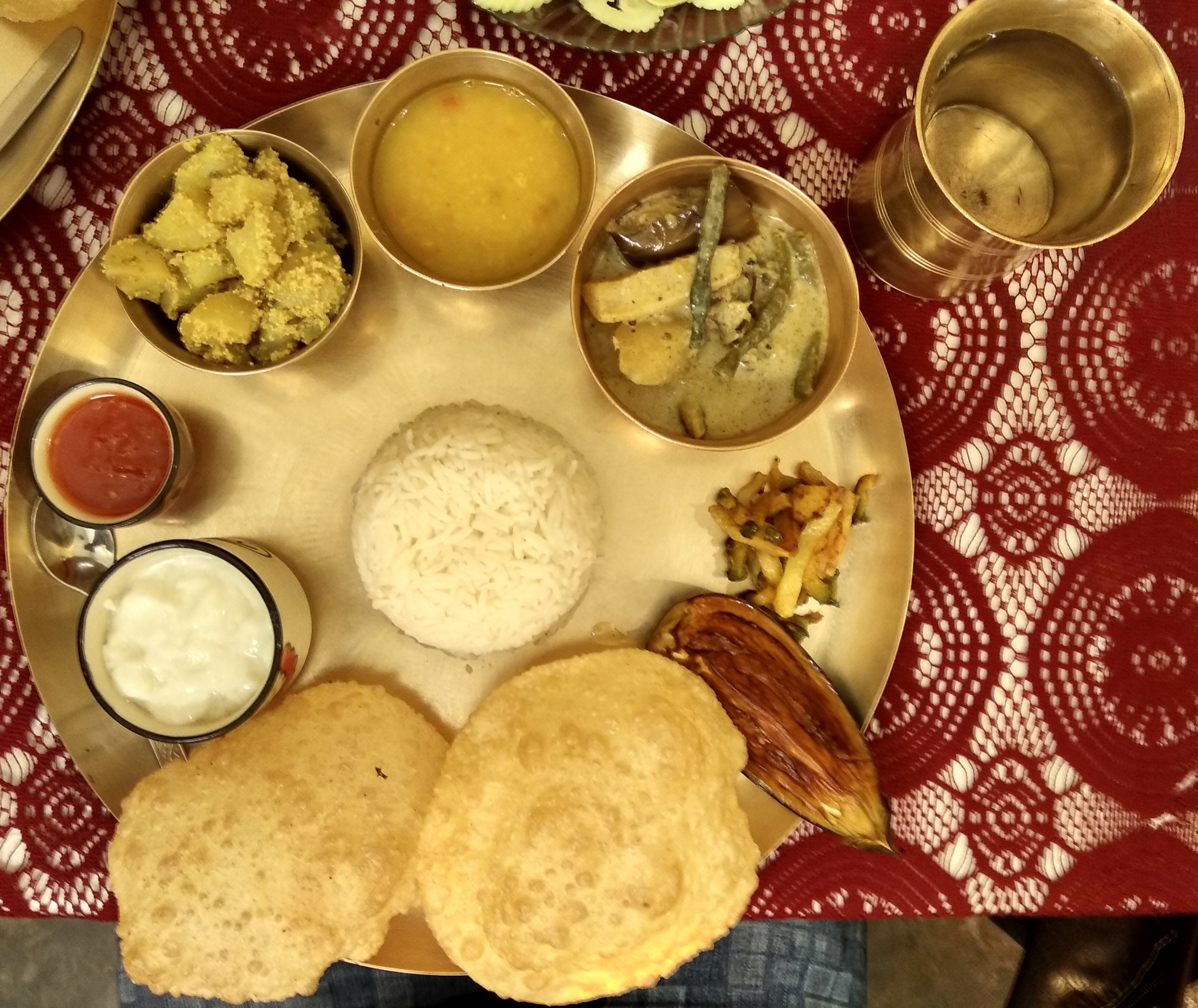
From West Bengal, a fancy arrangement of Bengali food, (left) and Bengali vegetarian meal (right).

The cuisine of West Bengal encompasses the cooking styles, traditions, and recipes associated with the modern Indian state of West Bengal. It has its own distinct characteristics, but it is very similar to the wider Bengali and Indian cuisine, partly historically and partly due to the import of ingredients and ideas from other regions of India and from foreign lands during the time of the British Raj. The cuisine of West Bengal is largely composed of Bengali cuisine, but also includes the cuisines of smaller ethnic groups and indigenous peoples.

Some traditional meals, such as rice and fried fish and Machher Jhol(or fish curry), kosha mangsho, vegetables, and various dishes of fresh water and salt water fish. The various plaques found at Chandraketugarh, the Brihaddharma Purana, the Mangal-Kāvya, Bengali cuisine and food habits and food items of the people of West Bengal can be traced back to the roots.

The cuisine of West Bengal has been influenced by foreign ingredients and cooking styles since the Middle Ages, mainly during the Mughal rule. Biryani was introduced to West Bengal by the Mughals, and the Chinese food arrived in Kolkata through the Chinese community. However, the localization of foreign food items occurred through Bengali cooking styles and ingredients.

== Characteristics ==
Modern cuisine in West Bengal has gradually become distant from ancient and medieval cuisine, one of the reasons for this is the cuisine of different cultures that have arrived in West Bengal at different times. However, items such as rice, fish, and vegetable existed in ancient times; which are popular for creating historical continuity between historical and modern cuisine.

In the southern part of West Bengal, especially in the Rarh region, the use of oil and spicy in food is less than in East Bengal. While Rarh and western Bengali cooking includes posto based dishes and chhanar dalna, East Bengal makes greater use of fish (such as hilsa, bhetki, rohu, chingri) mustard and chillies. West Bengal's cuisines are highly influenced by the cooking of the Tagore household. Watery vegetable Soup are popular in the hilly areas, including Darjeeling, and steam is used to prepare food.

The cuisine of West Bengal has been influenced by Portuguese, Mughal, and British ingredients. The cuisine of West Bengal is less influenced by Mughal cuisine than Dhaka. However, it is believed that Indian Chinese cuisine originated in Kolkata, which is a variation of the cuisine of West Bengal. The influence of Tibetan and Nepalese cooking styles is prominent in the hilly regions.

== Dishes ==
There are many food items that can be considered West Bengal's (broadly Bengali) dishes due to their ingredients, there are some which are quintessentially West Bengal. Dishes like Gobindobhog chaler payesh; sweets dishes like Kolkatar rasogolla, Sarbhaja-Sarpuria, Lyangcha, Komolabhog; various types of sandesh including Jolbhora; Aloo Posto, Dhokar dalna, Gohona Bori are considered to be symbols of the cuisine of West Bengal.

Familiarn dishes of West Bengal

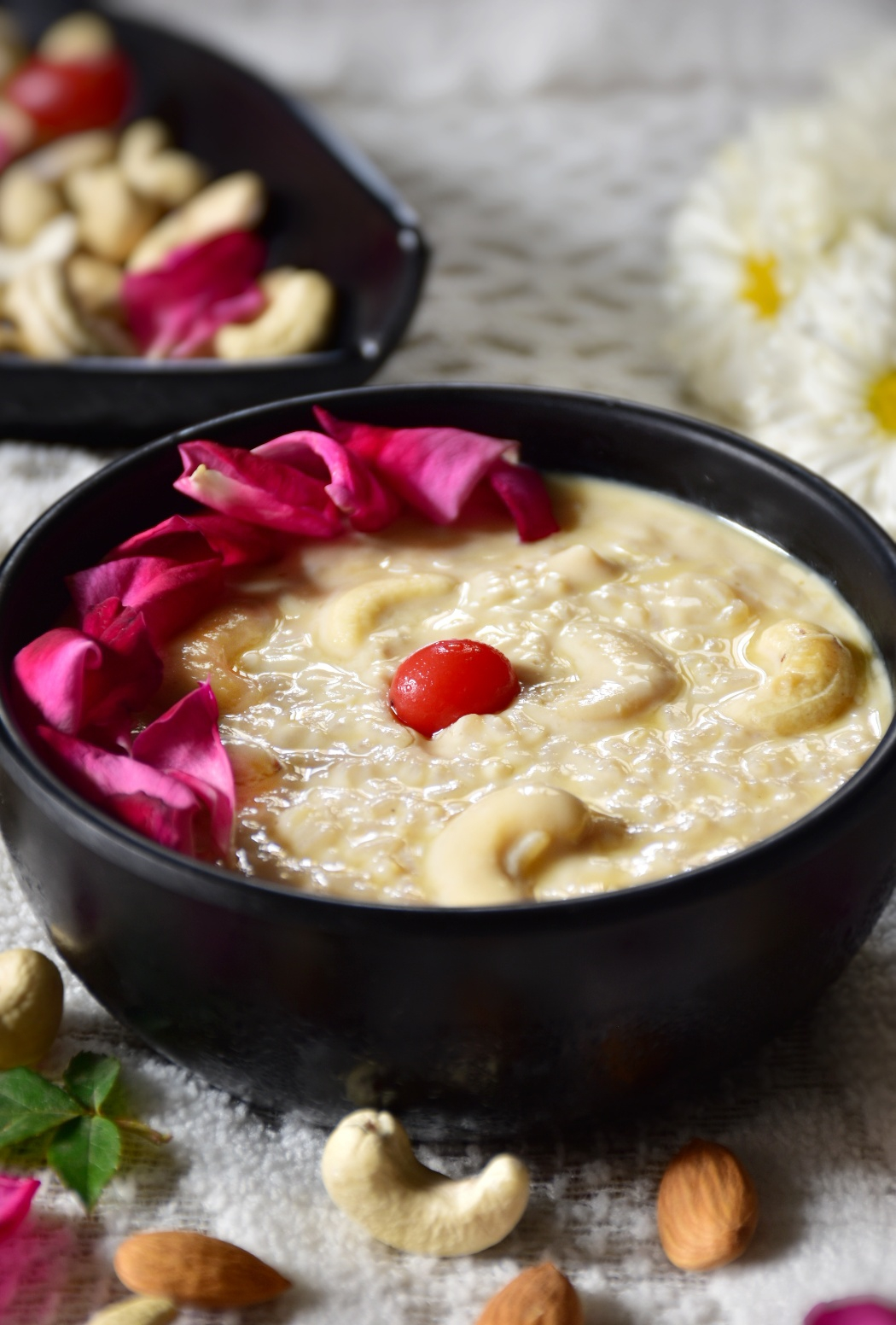
Payesh is a type of pudding from West Bengal.

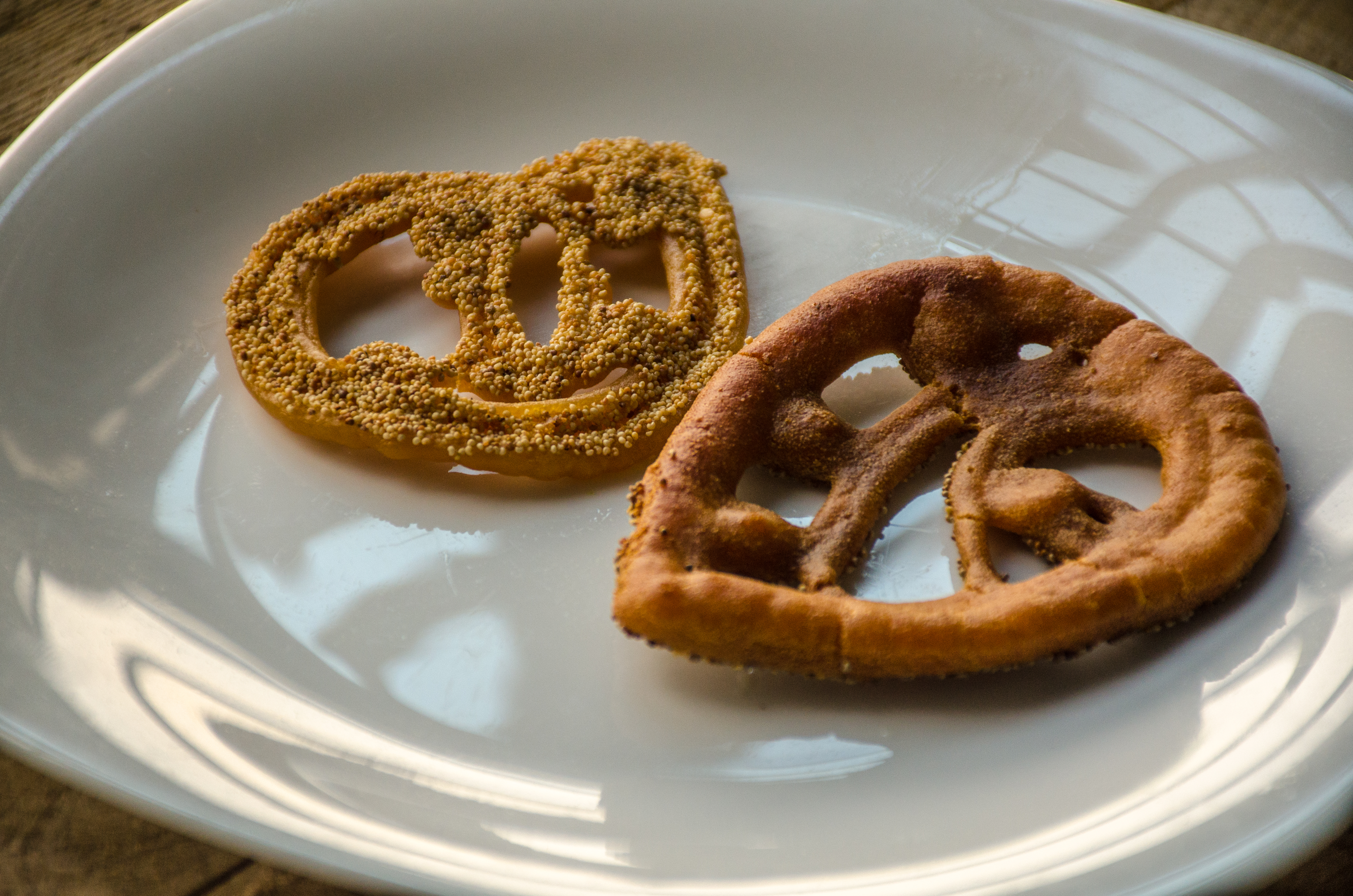
Gohona Bori

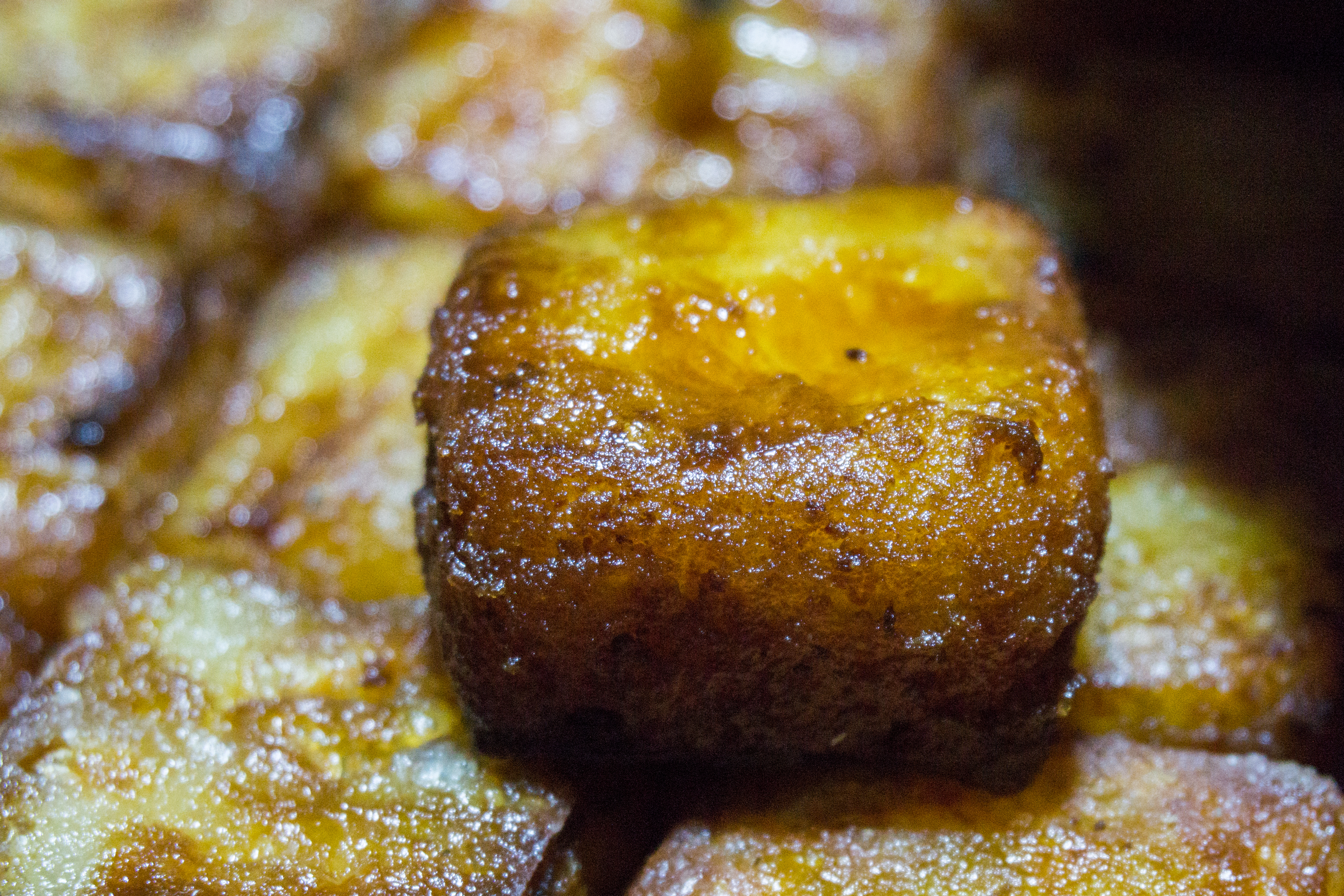
Shorbhaja is a Bengali sweet from the city of Krishnanagar, West Bengal which is made with layers of thickened milk cream, fried and then dipped in sugar syrup.

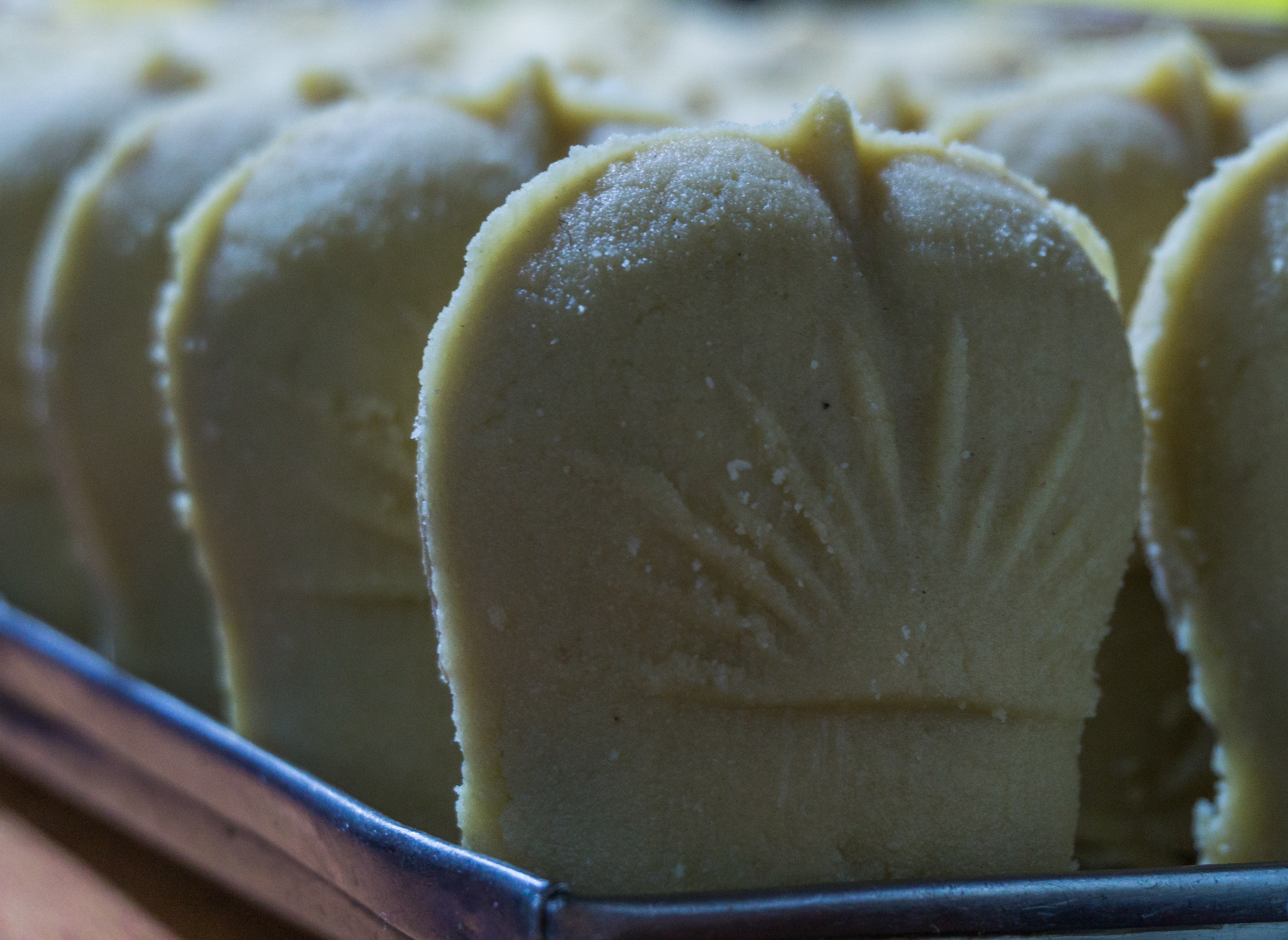
Jolbhora Sondesh

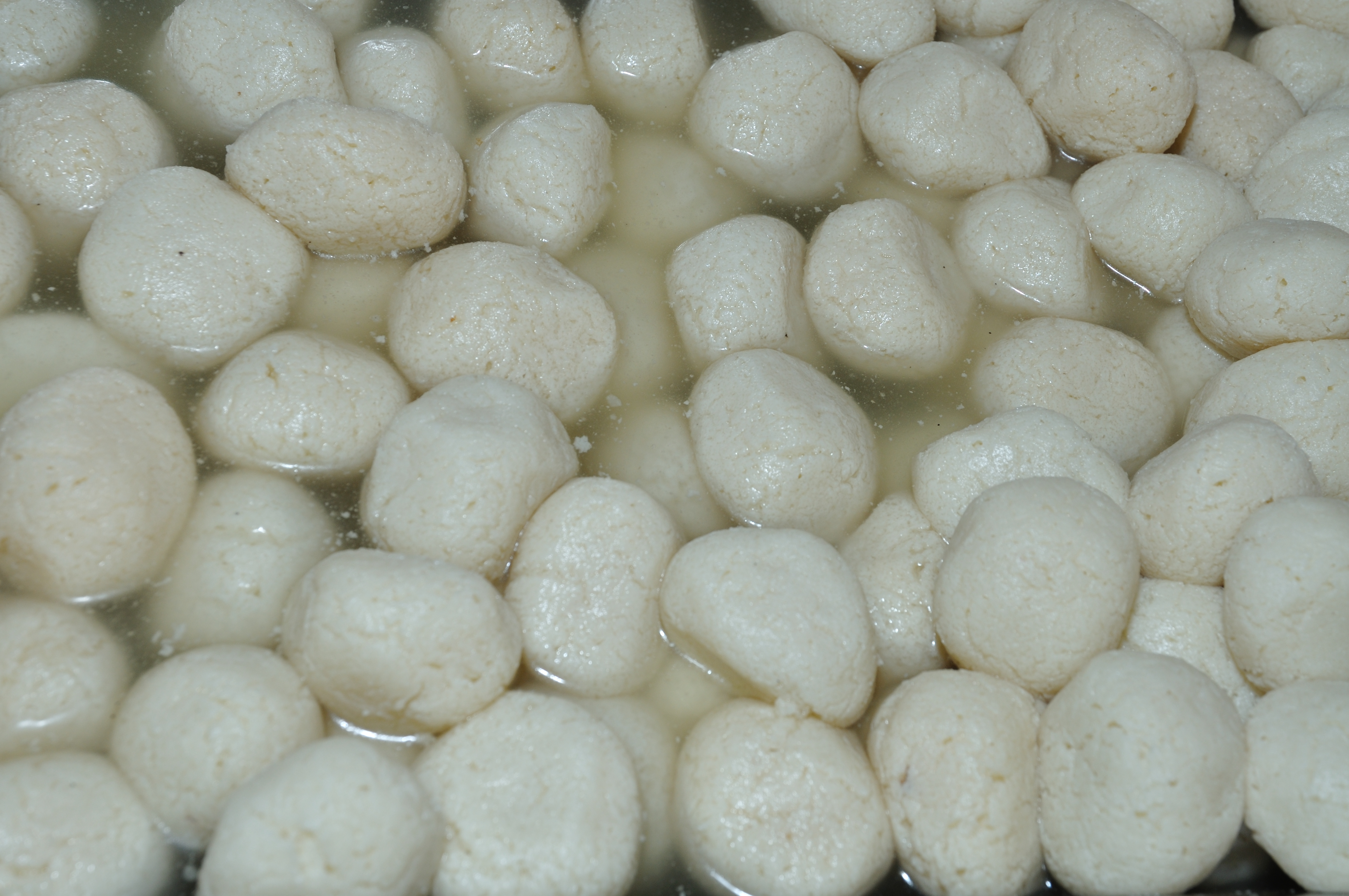
The spongy, white rôśôgolla is believed to have been introduced in present-day West Bengal in 1868 by a Kolkata-based confectioner named Nobin Chandra Das.

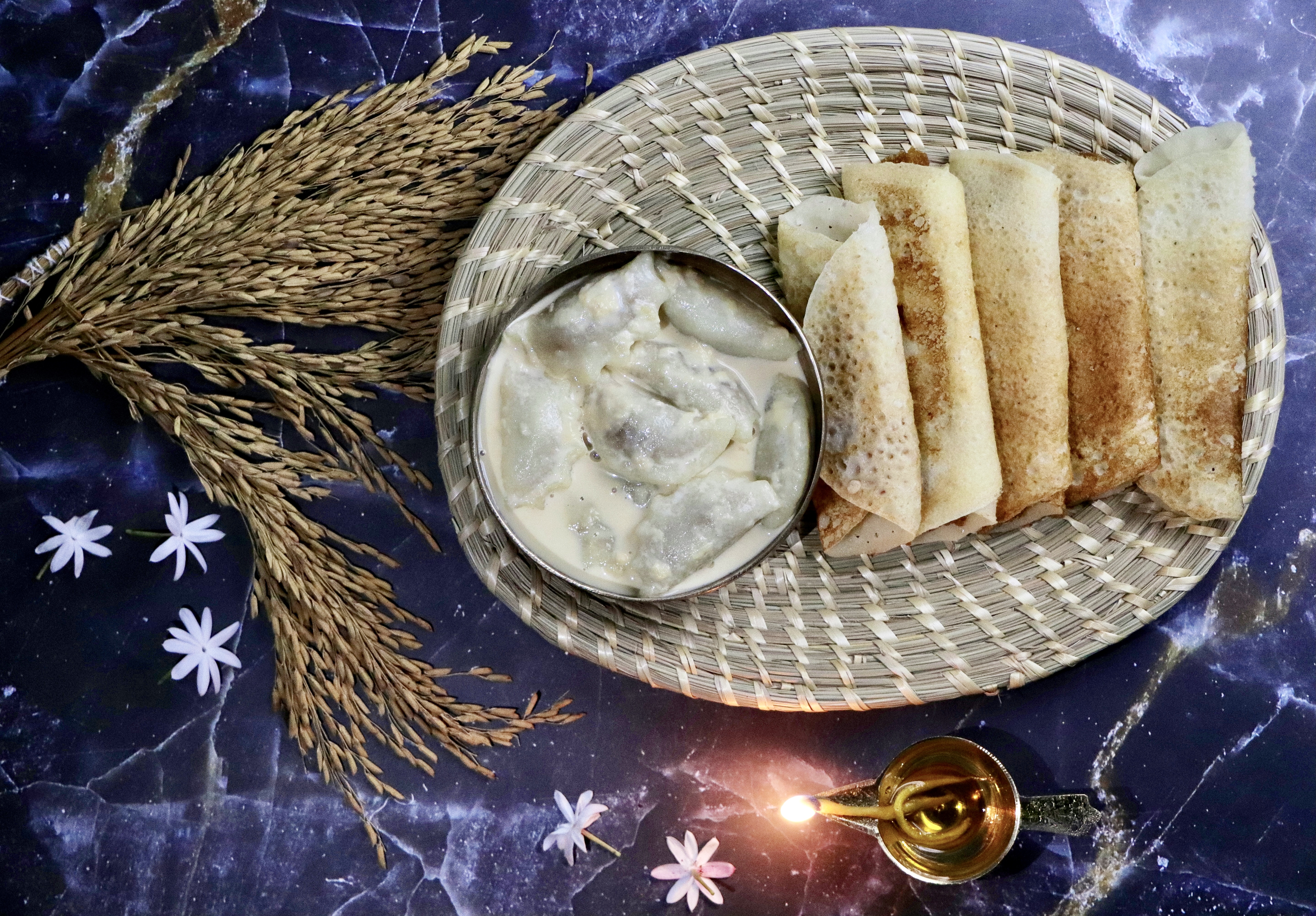
Pithe Puli

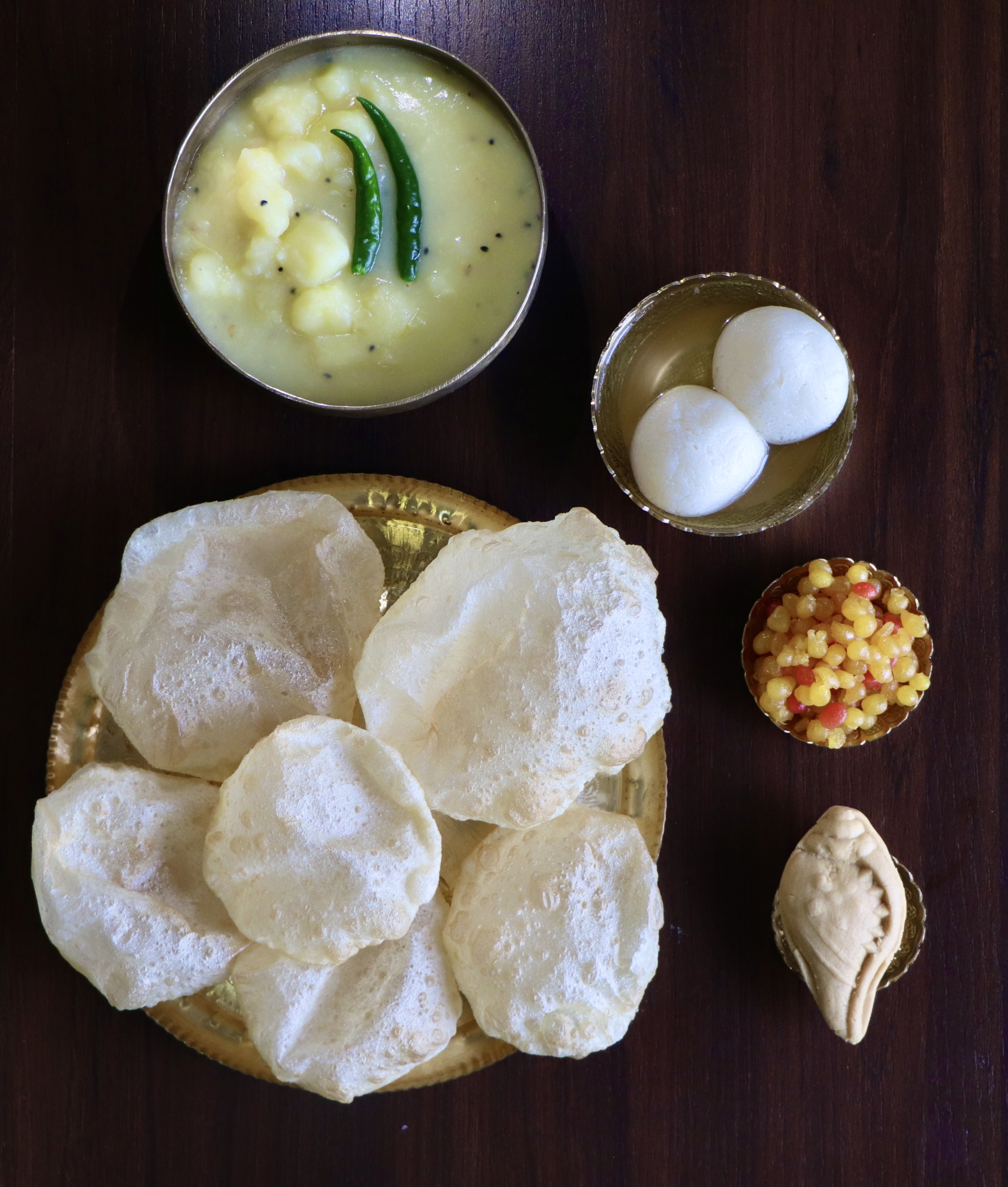
Luchi Alur Torkari

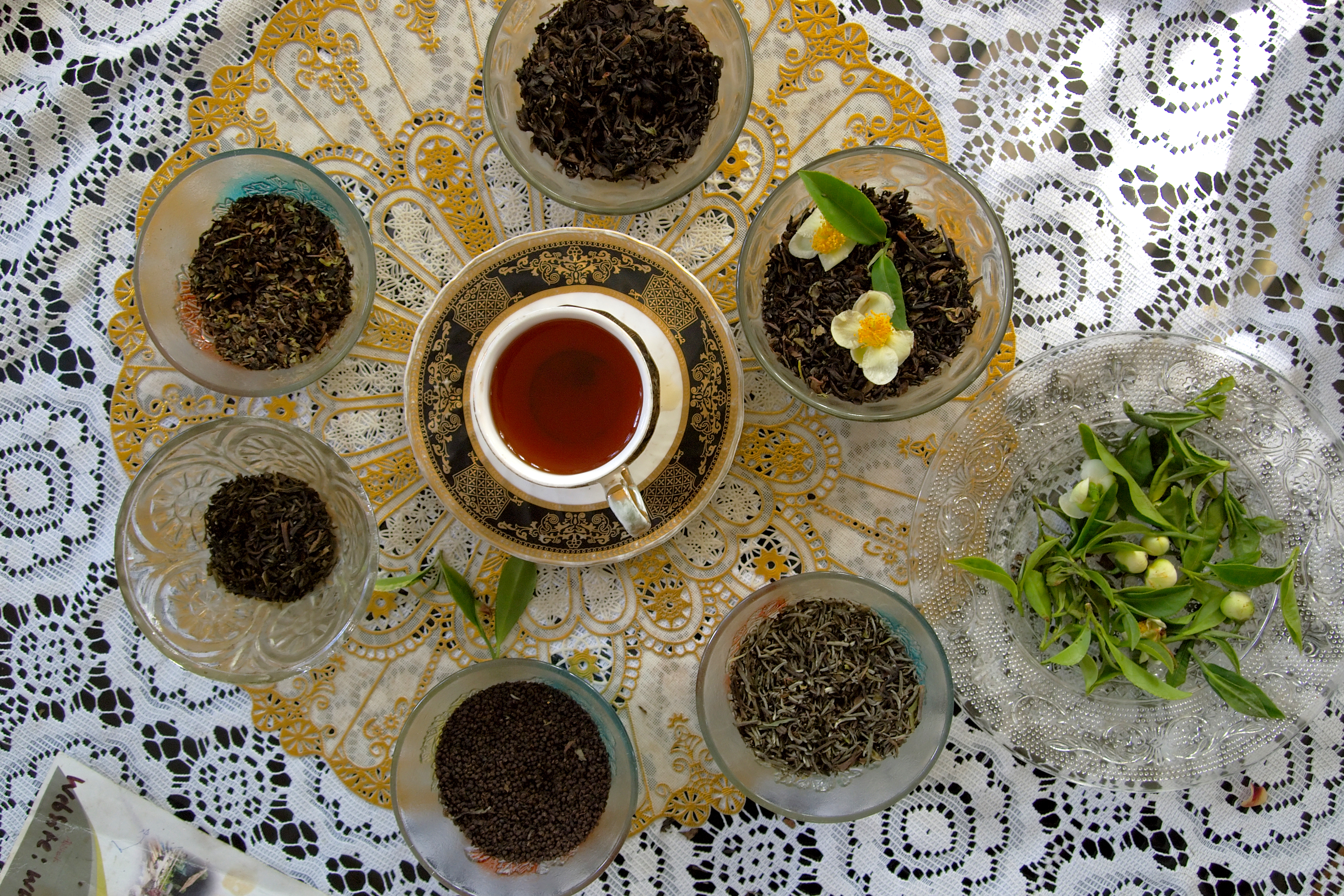
Darjeeling tea in varieties.

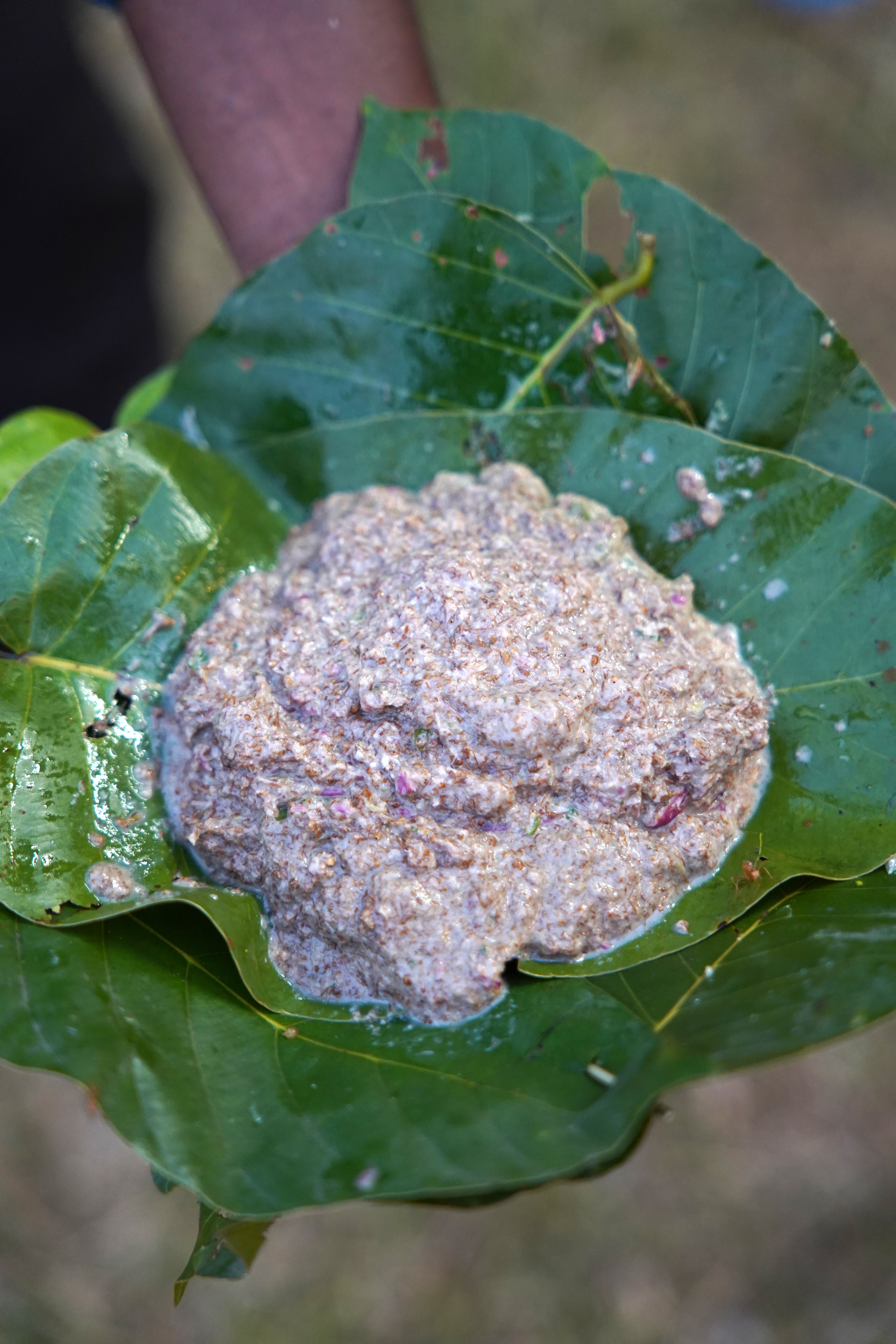
Hao Rit is a traditional condiment from Santal community

== See also ==
- Culture of Darjeeling

== Sources ==
- Murshid, Ghulam (2018). Bengali Culture: Over a Thousand Years. Niyogi Books.
- Ray, Niharranjan (1993). বাঙ্গালীর ইতিহাস: আদি পর্ব Bāṅgālīra itihāsa: Ādiparba [History of Bengalis: Early Phases] (PDF) (in Bengali) (Dey's [3rd] ed.). Kolkata: Dey's Publishing. ISBN 81-7079-270-3.
