= Chhilka roti =

Indian traditional bread

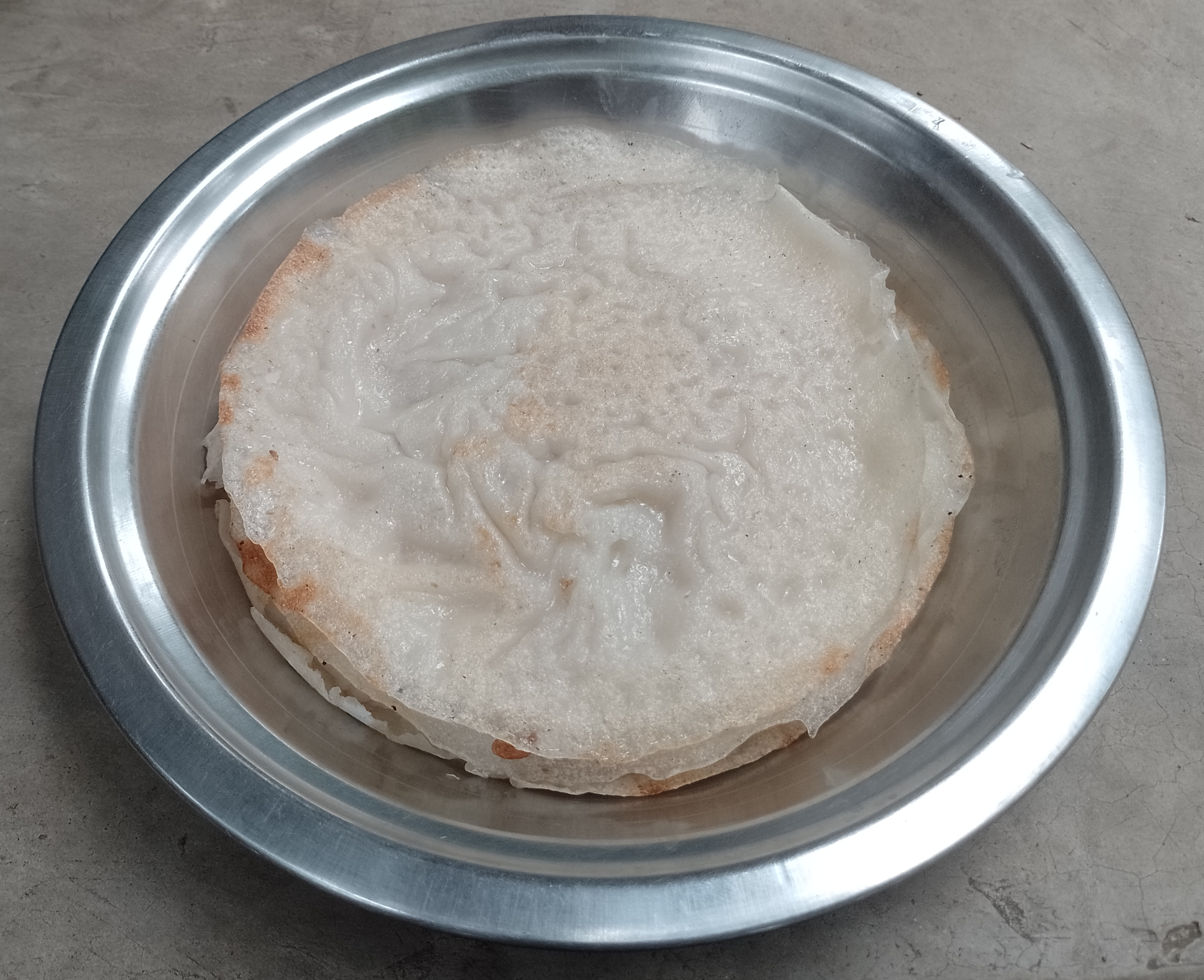
- Alternative names: Chilka roti
- Type: Bread
- Place of origin: India
- Region or state: Jharkhand
- Main ingredients: Rice, chana dal

Chhilka roti or chilka roti is a traditional bread of Jharkhand, India. It is prepared using rice flour and chana dal. It is served with chutney, vegetables and meat.

== Preparation ==
Rice and chana dal are soaked in water overnight. They are ground in the morning, after filtering the water to make a batter, and salt is added for taste. Then a little oil is greased on the heated tawa and half a bowl of batter is dispersed on it. After the mixture turns light brown, it is turned and the other side is roasted. When the other side turns light brown with proper roasting, the bread is ready. It is generally served with chutney, vegetables and meat.

== See also ==
- Indian bread
- Jharkhandi cuisine
