= Chhattisgarhi cuisine =

Culinary tradition

The State of Chhattisgarh is known as the rice bowl of India and has a rich tradition of food culture.

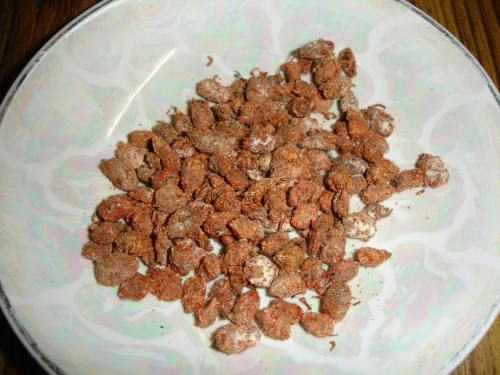
Red Velvet Mite is used as Medicine in Traditional Healing of Chhattisgarh

Cuisines of Chhattisgarh

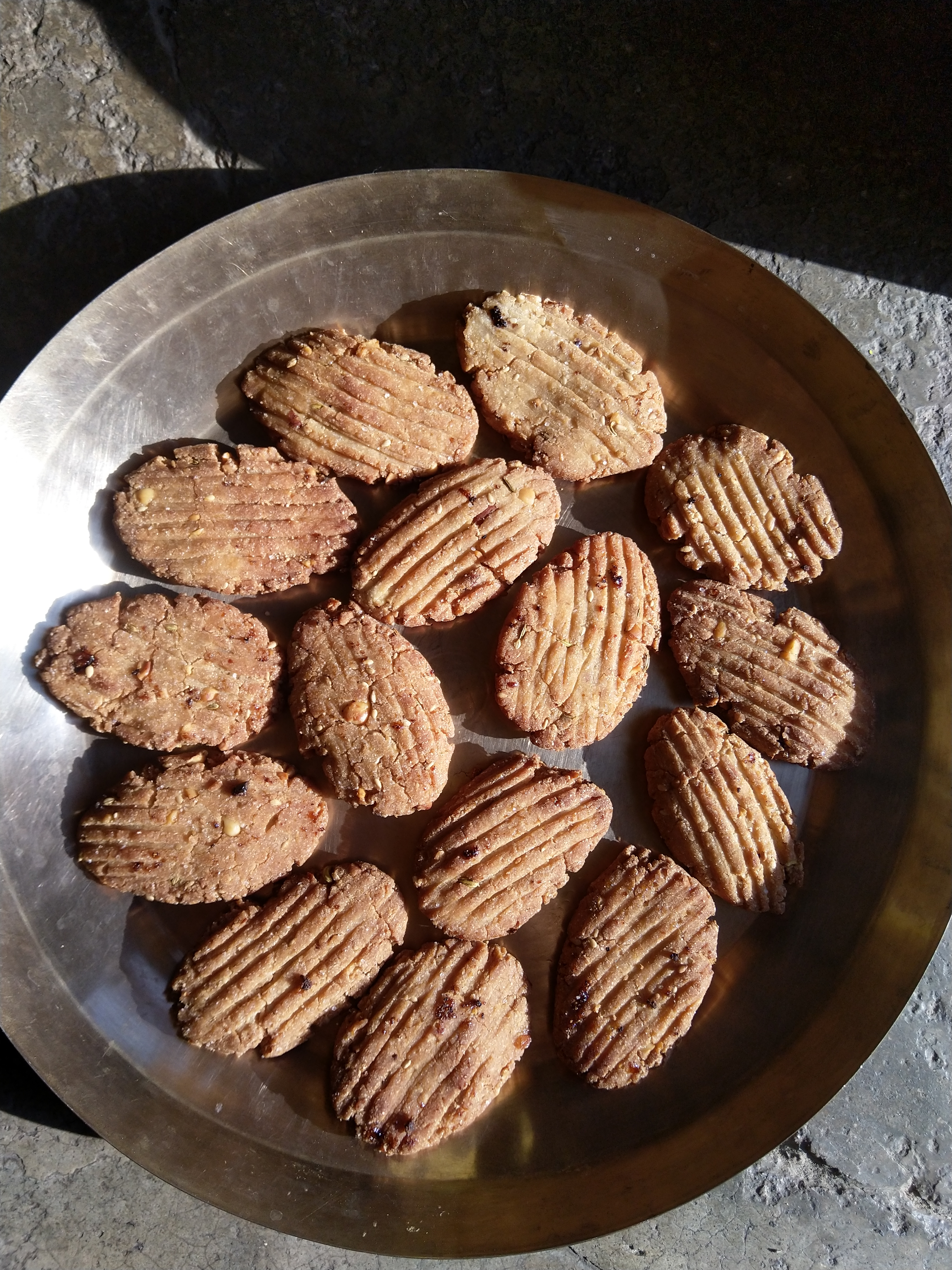
Khurmi

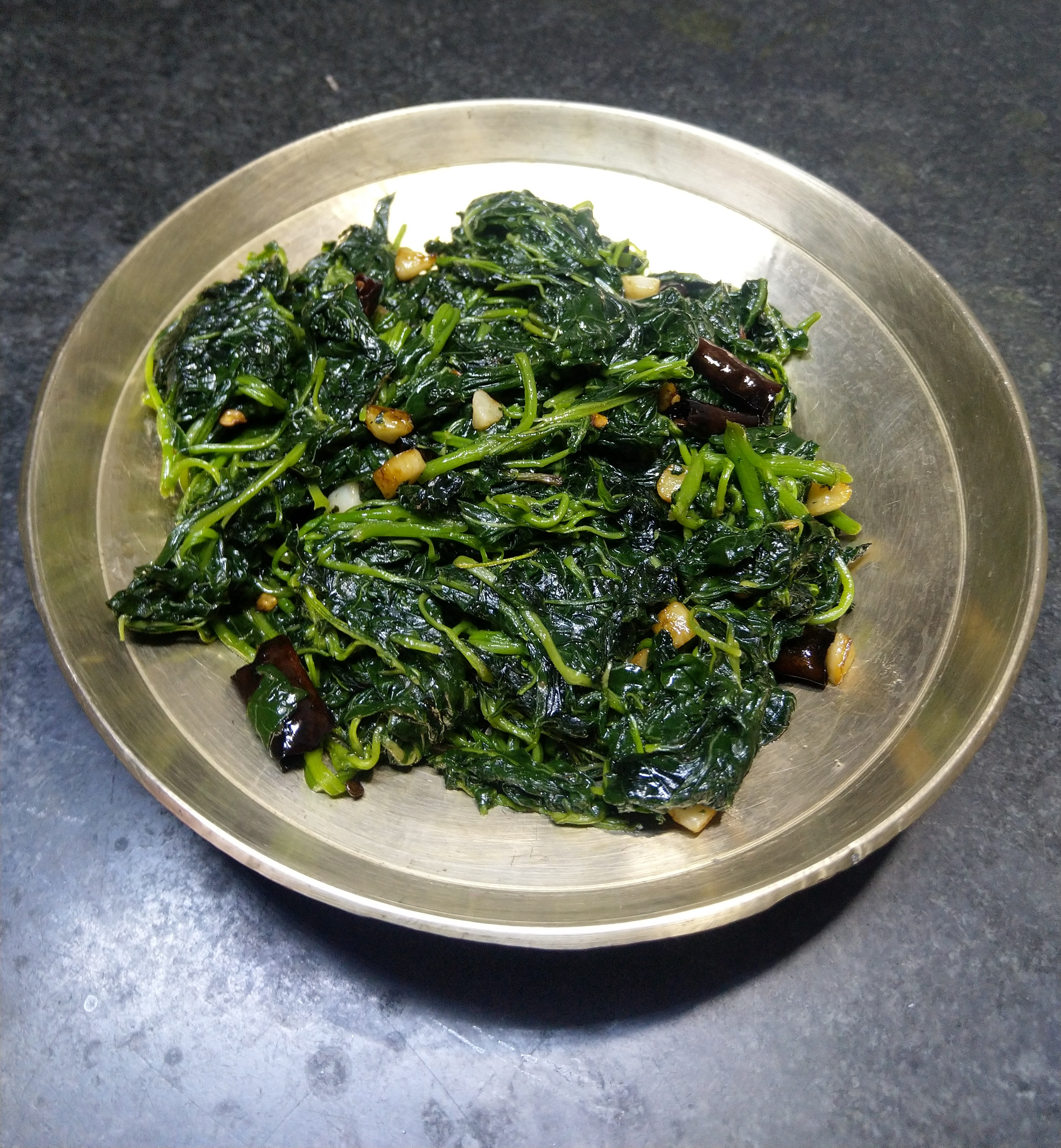
Ropa bhaji

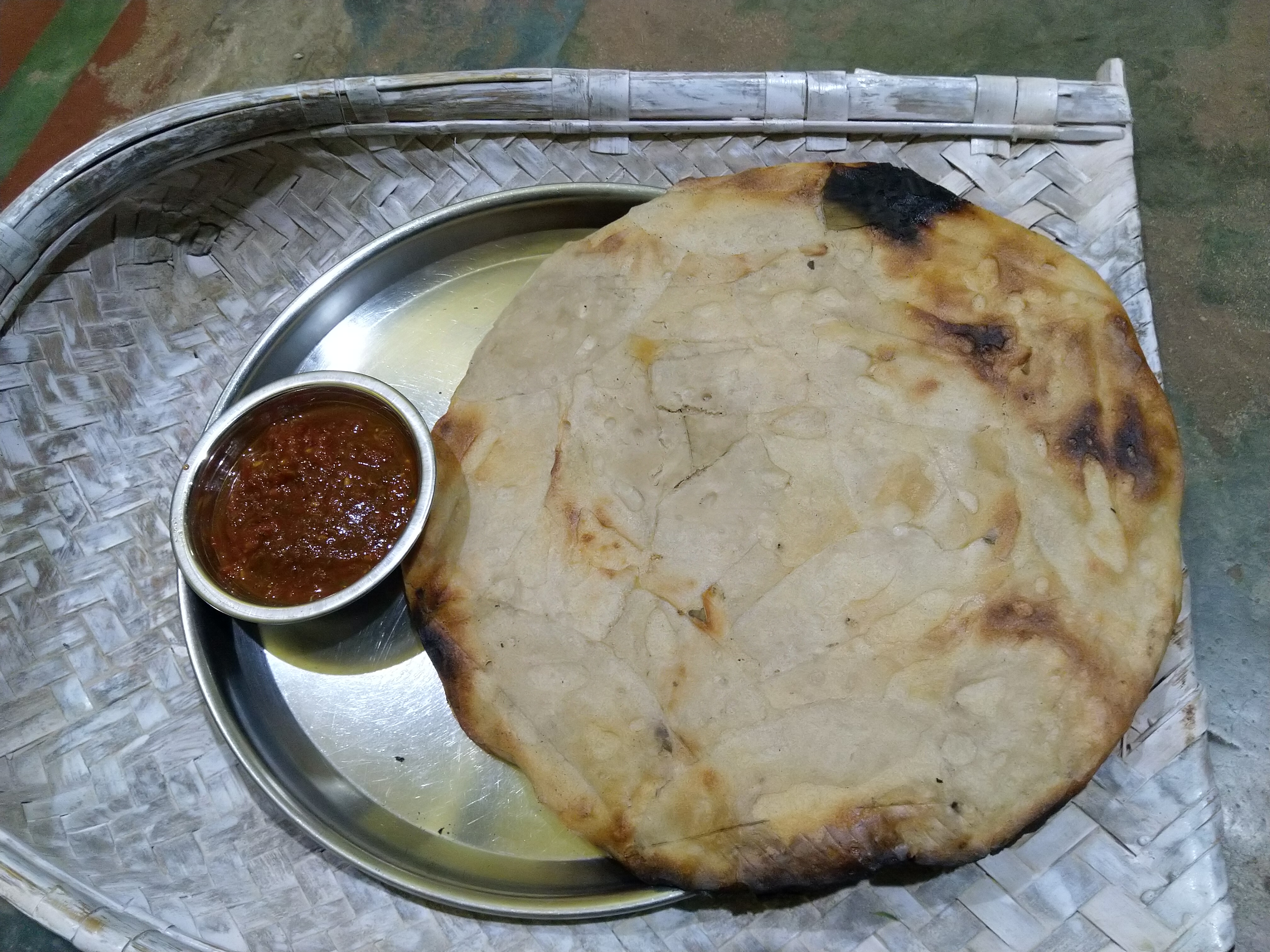
Angakar roti

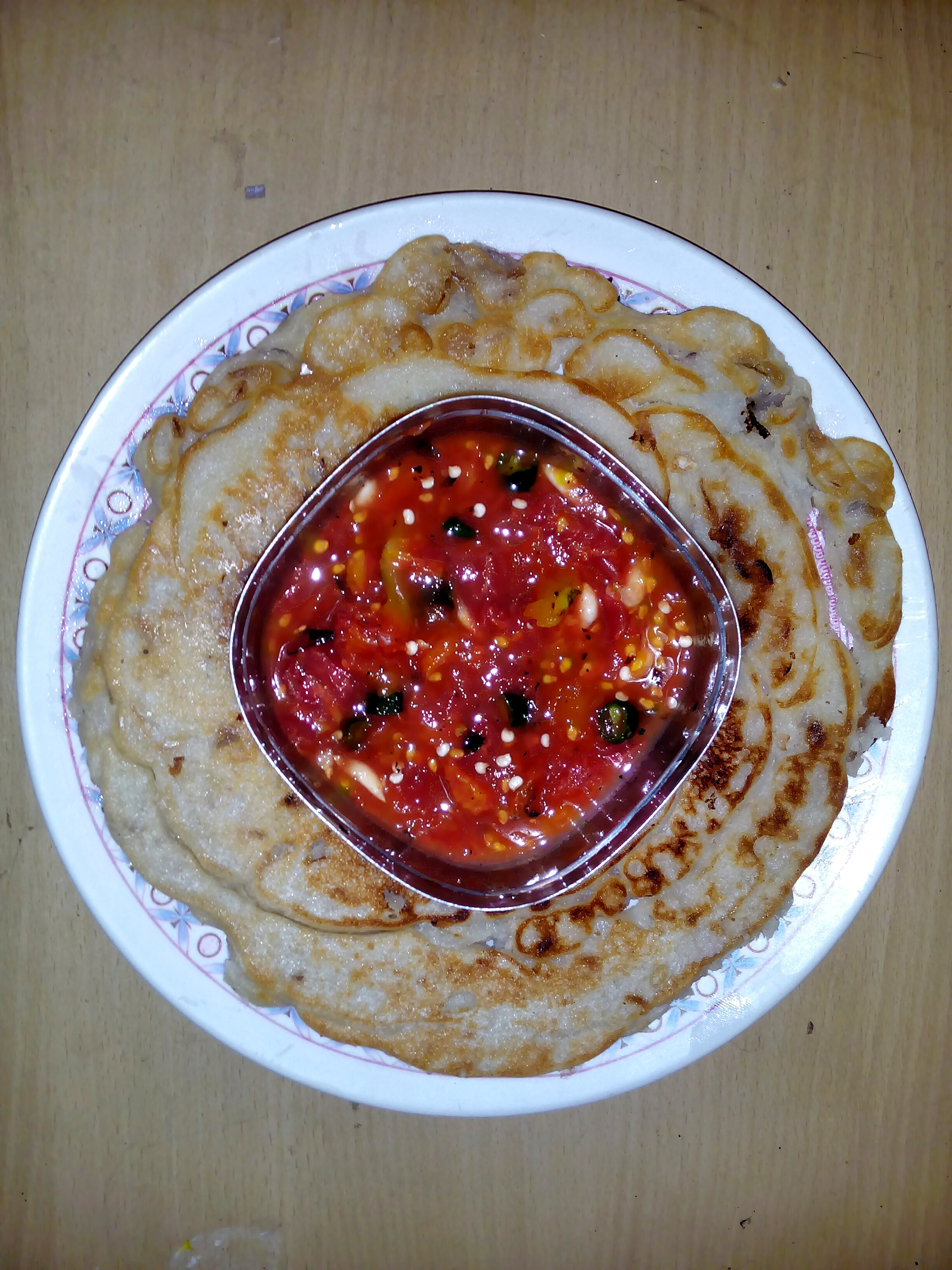
Dhuska roti

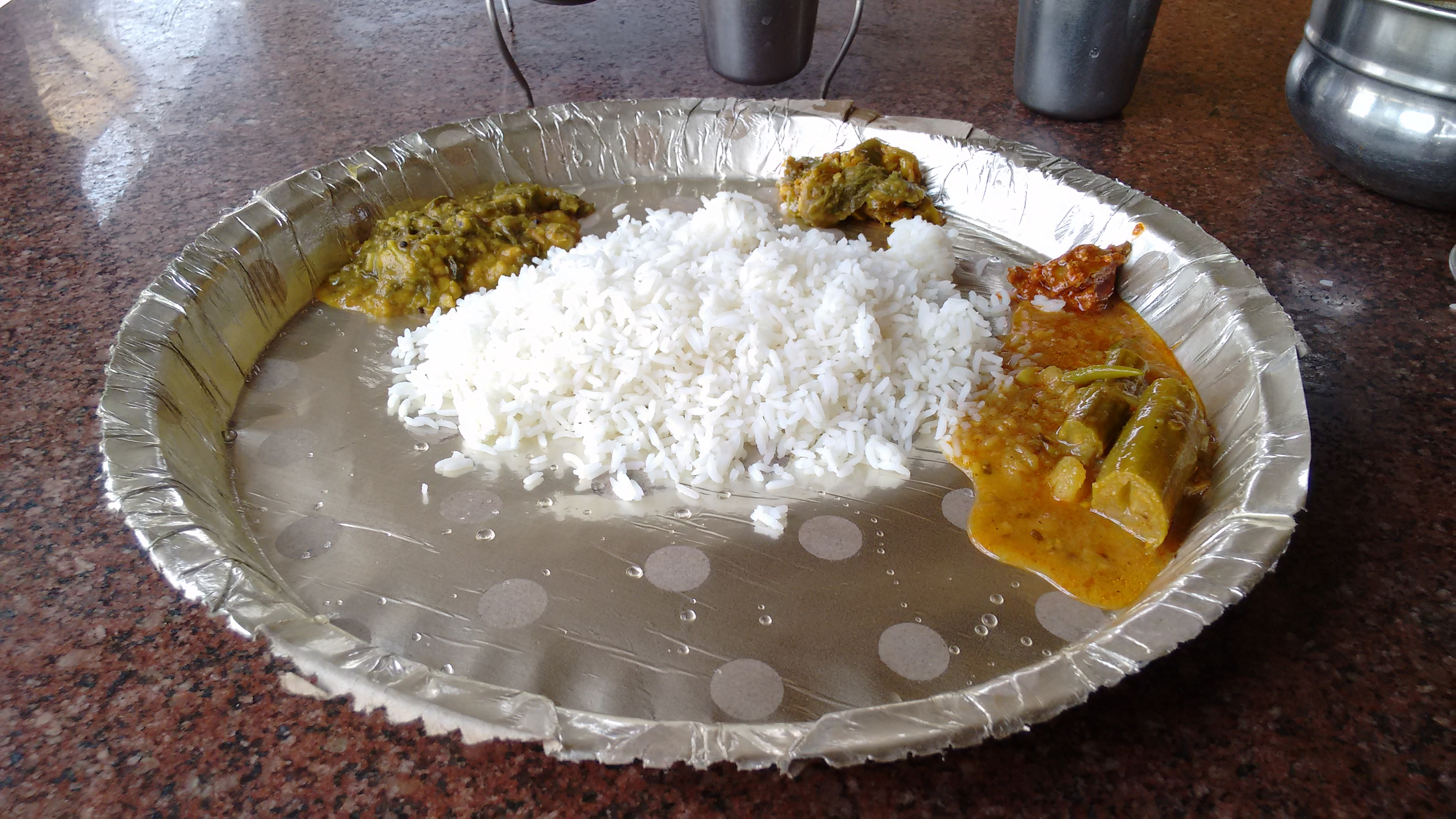
Drumstick curry

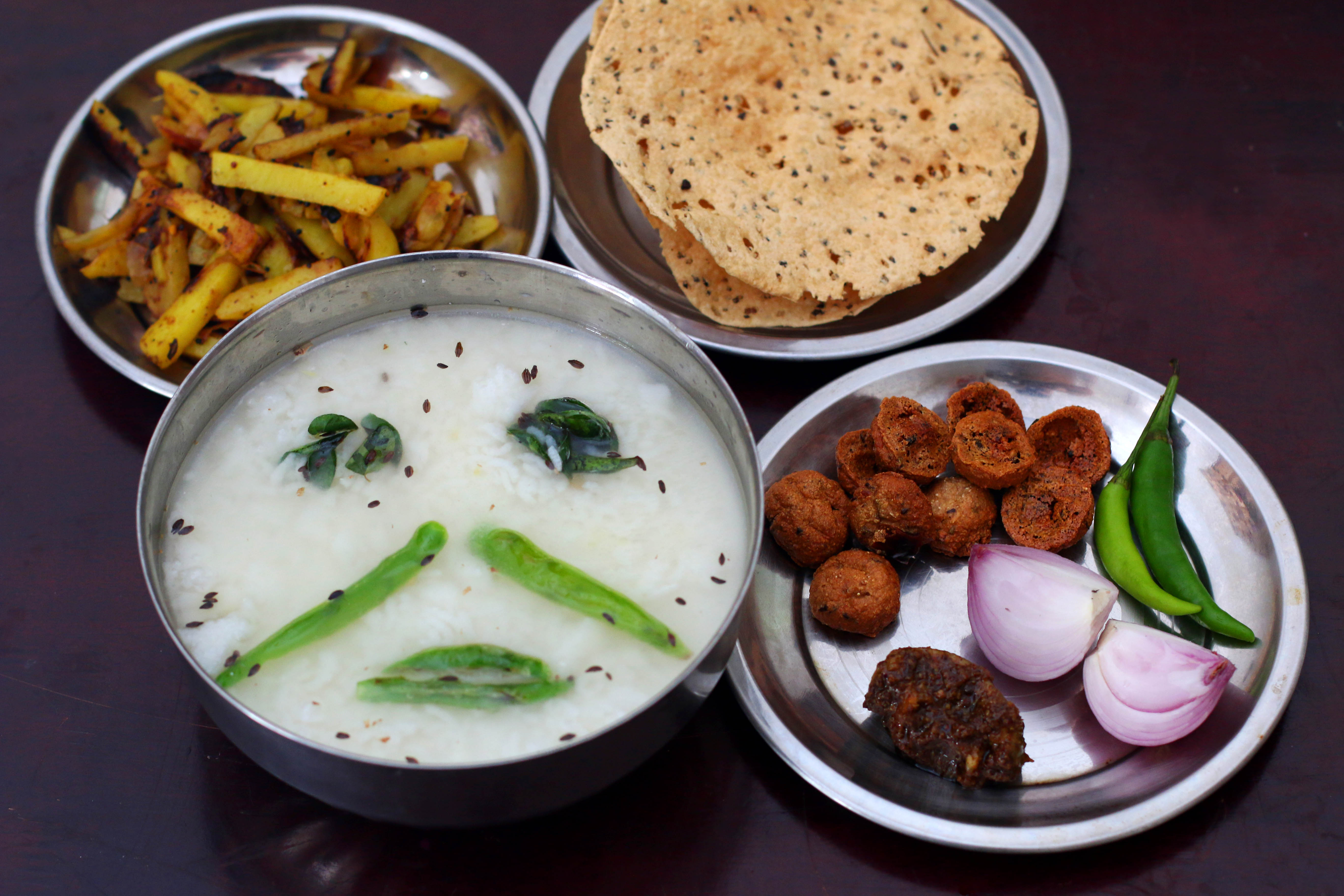
Bore Basi

Most of the traditional and tribal foods are made of rice and rice flour, curd and a variety of green leafy vegetables like lal bhaji, cholai bhaji, chech bhaji, kanda bhaji, kheksi, kathal, kochai patta, kohda and bohar bhaji (Blossom of Lesuaa or Rasaulaa in Hindi, mostly used for making achaar). Badi and Bijori are optional food categories; gulgula (bobra), bidiya, dhoodh fara, bafauli, basuli, balooshahi, singhara, tikhur, anarsa and khurmi fall in rice flour include fara/muthiya (rice rolls in white sauce), cheela (dosa like dish made with rice batter), angakar roti, chousela roti (rice puris), etc. One of the common meal had during the scorching summer is Bore Baasi (literally means dipped rice from last cooked meal) which mainly consists of cooked rice dipped in water/dahi/buttermilk. It is mostly accompanied by pickle and raw onion. It helps maintain the water levels in the body, keeping it cool and hydrated during the hot and arid summer days.

One of the well known traditional dishes of Chhattisgarh is Iddhar. It is made with ground Urad dal and kochai patta. Both are arranged in alternate layers 2-3 time and then rolled. This roll is then cooked in steam and cut into pieces. After that it is prepared with curd like curry. Some people also make it with gram flour (besan) instead of urad dal. Tribal and village populations drink a brew made of the small, creamy white flower of a local tree called Mahuwa.

Dishes like Chila and Phara are favourites. They are made with rice flour and eaten with spicy or tangy chutney of tomato, chilli and coriander. Chila is made by making a thick mixture of water and rice flour and then made like a plain dosa. On the therapy side phara is made by leftover rice and rice flour by making a dough and then make cylindrical shapes and giving tadka with jeera, mustard, curry leaves, tomato, turmeric, salt and chili. People of Chhattisgarh do not waste food. Baasi is left over rice dipped in water and curd and eaten with chutney.
