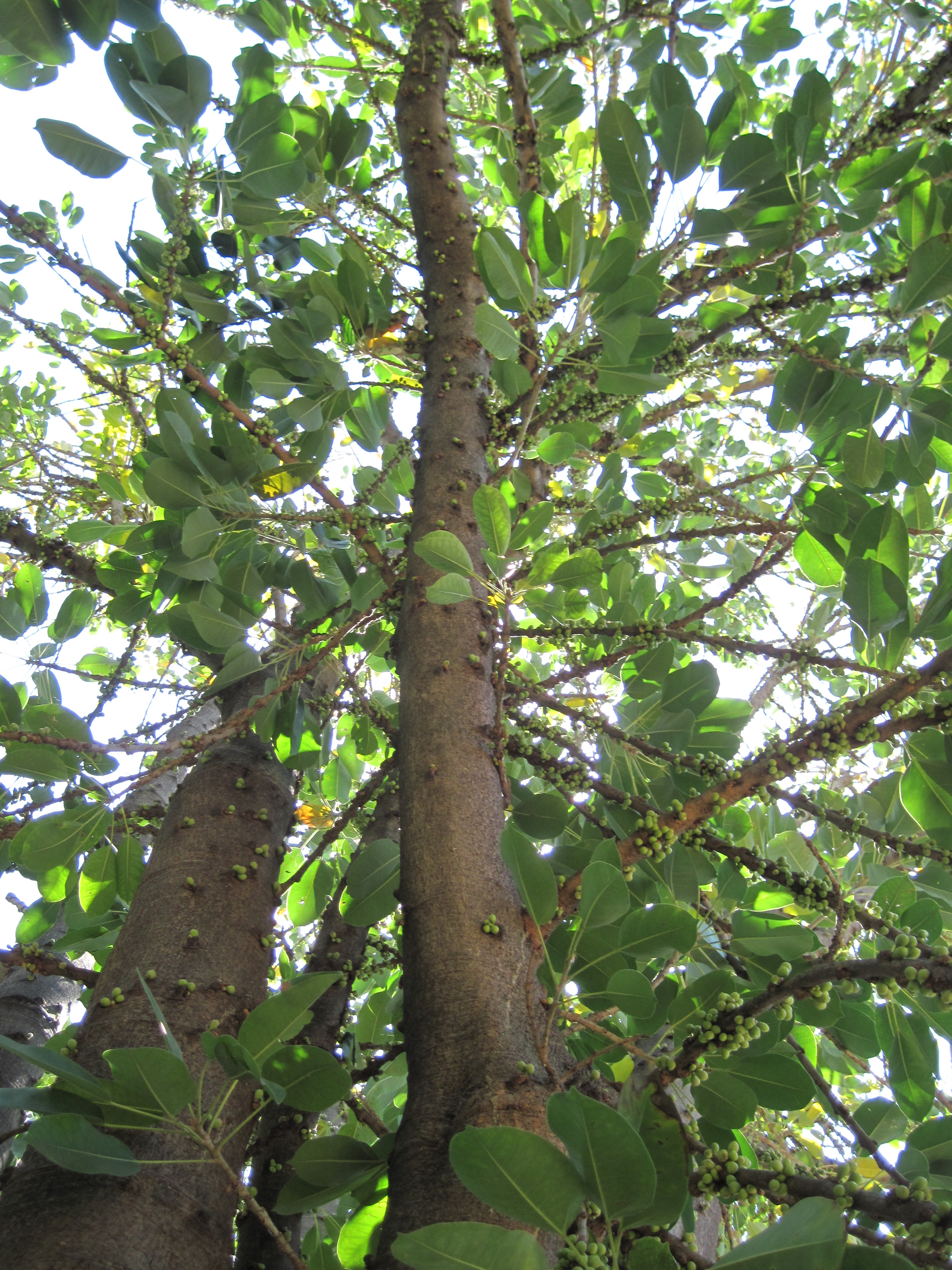

Conservation status
- Least Concern (IUCN 3.1)

Scientific classification
- Kingdom: Plantae
- Clade: Tracheophytes
- Clade: Angiosperms
- Clade: Eudicots
- Clade: Rosids
- Order: Rosales
- Family: Moraceae
- Genus: Ficus
- Species: F. geniculata

Binomial name
- Ficus geniculata Kurz

Varieties
- Ficus geniculata var. geniculata; Ficus geniculata var. insignis (Kurz) C.C.Berg

Synonyms
- synonyms of var. geniculata: Ficus geniculata var. abnormalis Kurz; Ficus tenii H.Lév.; synonyms of var. insignis: Ficus avium Gagnep.; Ficus insignis Kurz

= Ficus geniculata =

Species of flowering plant

Ficus geniculata, also known as putkal, is a species of flowering plant that belongs to family Moraceae, the fig or mulberry family. It is a tree native to parts of India, Bangladesh, Bhutan, Nepal, Indochina (the Andaman Islands, Cambodia, Laos, Myanmar, Thailand, and Vietnam), and southern China (Hainan, Sichuan, and Yunnan). It grows in lowland tropical moist evergreen and deciduous forests.

== Uses ==
The young leaves and buds of Ficus geniculata are cooked and consumed by the tribal people of the state of Jharkhand in India. It is also used for pickles and chutneys consumed throughout the year. The tender shoots are also eaten.
