= Gyalaphug =

Gyalaphug Jieluobu 杰罗布村
- Village
- Location of Gyalaphug in Bhutan
- Coordinates: 27.9807555°N 90.8975847°E
- Country: Unknown
- Established: October 2015

Gyalaphug or Jieluobu is a village located in a disputed part of the Bhutan-China border. China announced its establishment in October 2015. Media reports place the village 8 km within Bhutanese territory of Beyul, Lhuntse district, Bhutan while China places it in Lhodrak, Tibet Autonomous Region.The village is actually controlled by China and is part of the poverty alleviation plan. The local per capita annual income is about 16000 RMB (an increase of 13000 RMB compared to 2016)

== Map ==
杰罗布村

== See also ==
- Pangda
