= Doklam =

Disputed area between China and Bhutan

Doklam Donglang
- Plateau
- Map of Doklam and the surrounding area
- Coordinates: 27°18′N 88°56′E
- Range: Dongkya Range, Zompelri Ridge
- Water bodies: Doklam river

Area
  - Total: 89 square kilometres (34 mi^{2})
- Highest elevation: 4,653 metres (15,266 ft) (Merug La)

Doklam (Tibetan: འབྲོག་ལམ།, Wylie: ‘brog lam, THL: drok lam), (Note: Alternative phonetic spellings: Droklam and Zhoglam. An alternative English spelling Dolam is also witnessed.) called Donglang (Chinese: 洞朗) by China, is an area in Chumbi Valley with a high plateau and a valley, lying between China's Yadong County to the north, Bhutan's Haa District to the east and India's Sikkim state to the west. Since the 1960s, China and Bhutan have disputed sovereignty over the Doklam area. The dispute has not been resolved despite several rounds of border negotiations between Bhutan and China. The area is of strategic importance to all three countries.

In 1988, the Chinese People's Liberation Army entered the Doklam plateau and successfully took control of the area. In June 2017, China attempted to extend a road on the Doklam Plateau southward, prompting Indian troops to enter the area in an attempt to stop the project, which triggered a two-month border standoff between the two sides. On 28 August, India and China withdrew their troops from the standoff in Doklam. Since then, China has continued to control most of the Doklam area and built a village called Pangda there.

== Geography ==
The Imperial Gazetteer of India, representing the 19th century British view of the territory, states that the Dongkya range that separates Sikkim from the Chumbi Valley bifurcates at Mount Gipmochi into two great spurs, one running south-west and the other running south-east. Between these two spurs runs the valley of the Dichu or Jaldhaka river.

The Dongkya range that normally runs in the north–south direction gently curves to east–west at the southern end of the Chumbi Valley, running through the Batang La and Sinchela passes and sloping down to the plain. A second ridge to the south, called the Zompelri or Jampheri ridge, runs parallel to the first ridge, separated by the Doklam or Doka La valley in the middle. At the top of the valley, the two ridges are joined, forming a plateau. The highest points of the plateau are on its western shoulder, between Batang La and Mount Gipmochi, and the plateau slopes down towards the southeast. Between the two ridges lies the valley Torsa Nala (called Doklam River by the Chinese), which joins the Amo Chu river about 15 km (9.3 mi) to the southeast. (Note: After the confluence, the Amo Chu river itself is called "Torsa River" in Bhutan (Map 6). The naming is apparently derived from that of Torsa Natural Forest.)

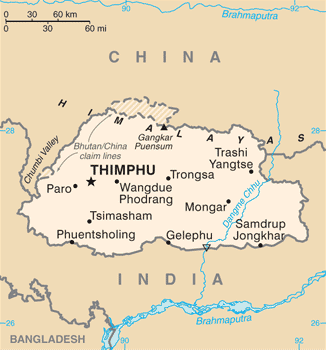
The 89 km^{2} (34 sq mi) area between the western shoulder of the plateau and the mouth of Torsa Nala is called Doklam by China. (Note: Map of Bhutan with two other disputed areas marked. Several newspaper reports wrongly identify "Doklam Plateau" with a disputed area to the east of Chumbi Valley. This is incorrect. The Doklam plateau is indeed to the south of the Chumbi valley. The disputed area to the east has no single name, but various parts of it are called Sinchulumpa (or Sinchulung), Gieu and Dramana.) In the Tibetan language, "Doklam", or more properly "Droklam", means a nomad's path. The said path can be seen in Maps 5–7, which runs from the village of "Shuiji" in the vicinity of Sangbay (Sangbe), climbing up to the Doklam plateau and descending to the Amo Chu valley through the Sinche La pass. It continues along the river to the hamlet of Asam on what was then regarded as the border of Tibet, and proceeds to the town of Rinchengang, which was a border trade mart. According to scholar Jigme Yeshe Lama, such paths were used for ages by traders, nomads and pilgrims.

India's Sikkim state lies to the west of the Dongkya range, the western shoulder of the Doklam plateau and the 'southwest spur' issuing from Mount Gipmochi. This spur is cut by the Dichu river (also called Jaldhaka) which originates below the Jelep La pass and enters Bhutan. The 'southeast spur', called Zompelri ridge, separates Bhutan's Haa District (to the north) from the Samtse (to the south).

Bhutan's claimed border runs along the northern ridge of the Doklam plateau until Sinchela and then moves down to the valley to the Amo Chu river. China's claim of the border includes the entire Doklam area within the Chumbi Valley, ending at the Zompelri ridge on the south and the confluence of the Torsa Nala with Amo Chu on the east.

== Strategic significance ==
Map 2: Tibet's Chumbi Valley pointing towards India's Siliguri Corridor between Nepal and Bangladesh

Scholar Susan Walcott counts China's Chumbi Valley, to the north of Doklam, and India's Siliguri Corridor, to the south of Doklam, among "strategic mountain chokepoints critical in global power competition". John Garver has called the Chumbi Valley "the single most strategically important piece of real estate in the entire Himalayan region". The Chumbi Valley intervenes between Sikkim and Bhutan south of the high Himalayas, pointing towards India's Siliguri Corridor like a "dagger".

The Siliguri Corridor is a narrow 24 kilometer-wide corridor between Nepal and Bangladesh in India's West Bengal state, which connects the central parts of India with the northeastern states including the contested state of Arunachal Pradesh. Often referred to as the "chicken's neck", the Siliguri Corridor represents a strategic vulnerability for India. It is of key strategic significance to Bhutan, containing the main supply routes into the country.

Historically, both Siliguri and Chumbi Valley were part of a highway of trade between India and Tibet. In the 19th century, the British Indian government sought to open up the route to British trade, leading to their suzerainty over Sikkim with its strategic Nathu La and Jelep La passes into the Chumbi Valley. Following the Anglo-Chinese treaty of 1890 and Younghusband expedition, the British established trading posts at Yatung and Lhasa, along with military detachments to protect them. These trade relations continued till 1959, when the Chinese government terminated them.

The Doklam area had little role in these arrangements, because the main trade routes were either through the Sikkim passes or through the interior of Bhutan entering the Chumbi Valley in the north near Phari. There is some fragmentary evidence of trade through the Amo Chu valley, but the valley is said to have been narrow with rocky faces with a torrential flow of the river, not conducive for a trade route.

Indian intelligence officials state that China had been carrying out a steady military build-up in the Chumbi Valley, building many garrisons and converting the valley into a strong military base. In 1967, border clashes occurred at Nathu La and Cho La passes, when the Chinese contested the Indian demarcations of the border on the Dongkya range. In the ensuing artillery fire, states scholar Taylor Fravel, many Chinese fortifications were destroyed as the Indians controlled the high ground. The Chinese military is believed to be in a weak position in the Chumbi Valley because the Indian and Bhutanese forces control the heights surrounding the valley.

The desire for heights is thought to bring China to the Doklam plateau. Indian security experts mention three strategic benefits to China from a control of the Doklam plateau. First, it gives it a commanding view of the Chumbi valley itself. Second, it outflanks the Indian defences in Sikkim which are currently oriented northeast towards the Dongkya range. Third, it overlooks the strategic Siliguri Corridor to the south. A claim to the Mount Gipmochi and the Zompelri ridge would bring the Chinese to the very edge of the Himalayas, from where the slopes descend into the southern foothills of Bhutan and India. From here, the Chinese would be able to monitor the Indian troop movements in the plains or launch an attack on the vital Siliguri Corridor in the event of a war. To New Delhi, this represents a "strategic redline". Scholar Caroline Brassard states, "its strategic significance for the Indian military is obvious."

== History ==
The historical status of the Doklam plateau is uncertain.

According to Sikkimese tradition, when the Kingdom of Sikkim was founded in 1642, it included all the areas surrounding the Doklam plateau: the Chumbi Valley to the north, the Haa Valley to the east as well as the Darjeeling and Kalimpong areas to the southwest. During the 18th century, Sikkim faced repeated raids from Bhutan and these areas often changed hands. After a Bhutanese attack in 1780, a settlement was reached, which resulted in the transfer of the Haa valley and the Kalimpong area to Bhutan. The Doklam plateau sandwiched between these regions is likely to have been part of these territories. The Chumbi Valley was still said to have been under the control of Sikkim at this point.

Historians qualify this narrative, Saul Mullard states that the early kingdom of Sikkim was very much limited to the western part of modern Sikkim. The eastern part was under the control of independent chiefs, who did face border conflicts with the Bhutanese, losing the Kalimpong area. The possession of the Chumbi Valley by the Sikkimese is uncertain, but the Tibetans are known to have fended off Bhutanese incursions there.

After the unification of Nepal under the Gorkhas in 1756, Nepal and Bhutan had coordinated their attacks on Sikkim. Bhutan was eliminated from the contest by an Anglo-Bhutanese treaty in 1774. Tibet enforced a settlement between Sikkim and Nepal, which is said to have irked Nepal. Following this, by 1788, Nepal occupied all of the Sikkim areas to the west of the Teesta river as well as four provinces of Tibet. Tibet eventually sought the help of China, resulting in the Sino-Nepalese War of 1792. This proved to be a decisive entry of China into the Himalayan politics. The victorious Chinese General ordered a land survey, in the process of which the Chumbi valley was declared as part of Tibet. The Sikkimese resented the losses forced upon them in the aftermath of the war.

=== British Raj period ===
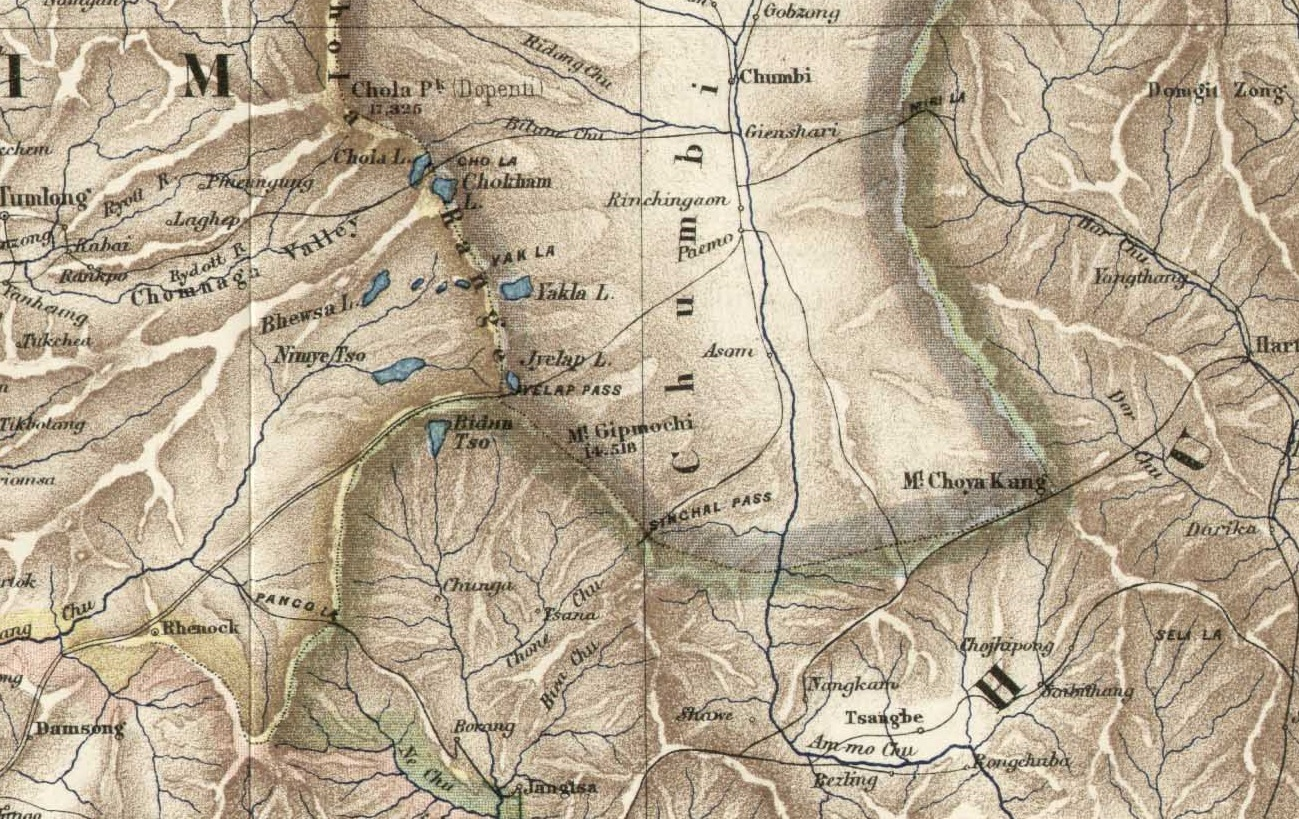
Map 3: An 1881 map depicting the trijunction area by Sir Richard Temple. (Note: Sir Richard Temple was the Lt. Governor of the Bengal province, with jurisdiction over Darjeeling and Kalimpong, as well as the political relations with Sikkim and Bhutan.) Mount Gipmochi is shown on the Dongkya Range between Jelep La and Sinchela.

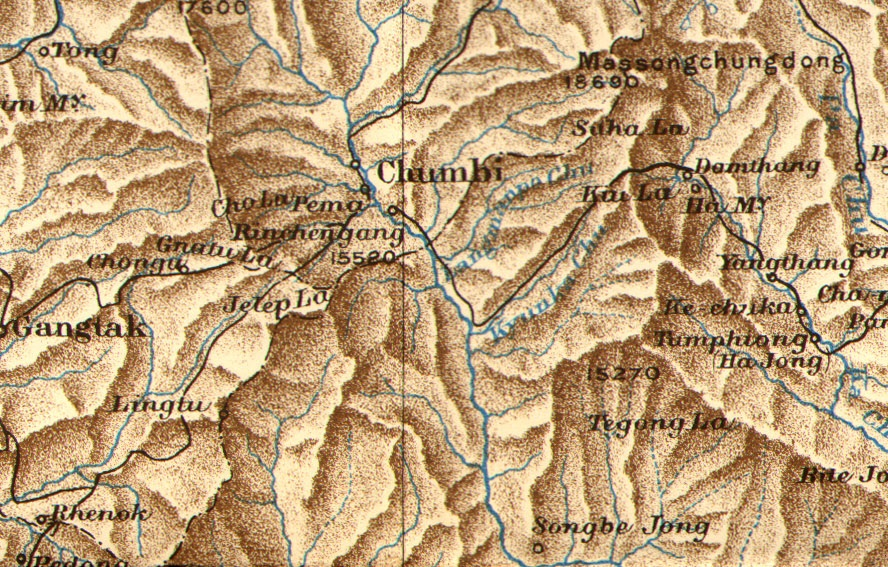
Map 4: 1909 map of Tibet–Bhutan border by John Claude White. (Note: John Claude White was the British Political Officer in Sikkim with responsibility for managing relations with Tibet and Bhutan. He travelled from Sikkim to Bhutan in 1905 via Chumbi Valley. His route is marked on the map.) The border of Bhutan passes through Gipmochi and Batangla peaks (unmarked, but next to "Jelep La"), and, after crossing Amo Chu, continues on the western watershed of Langmaro Chu

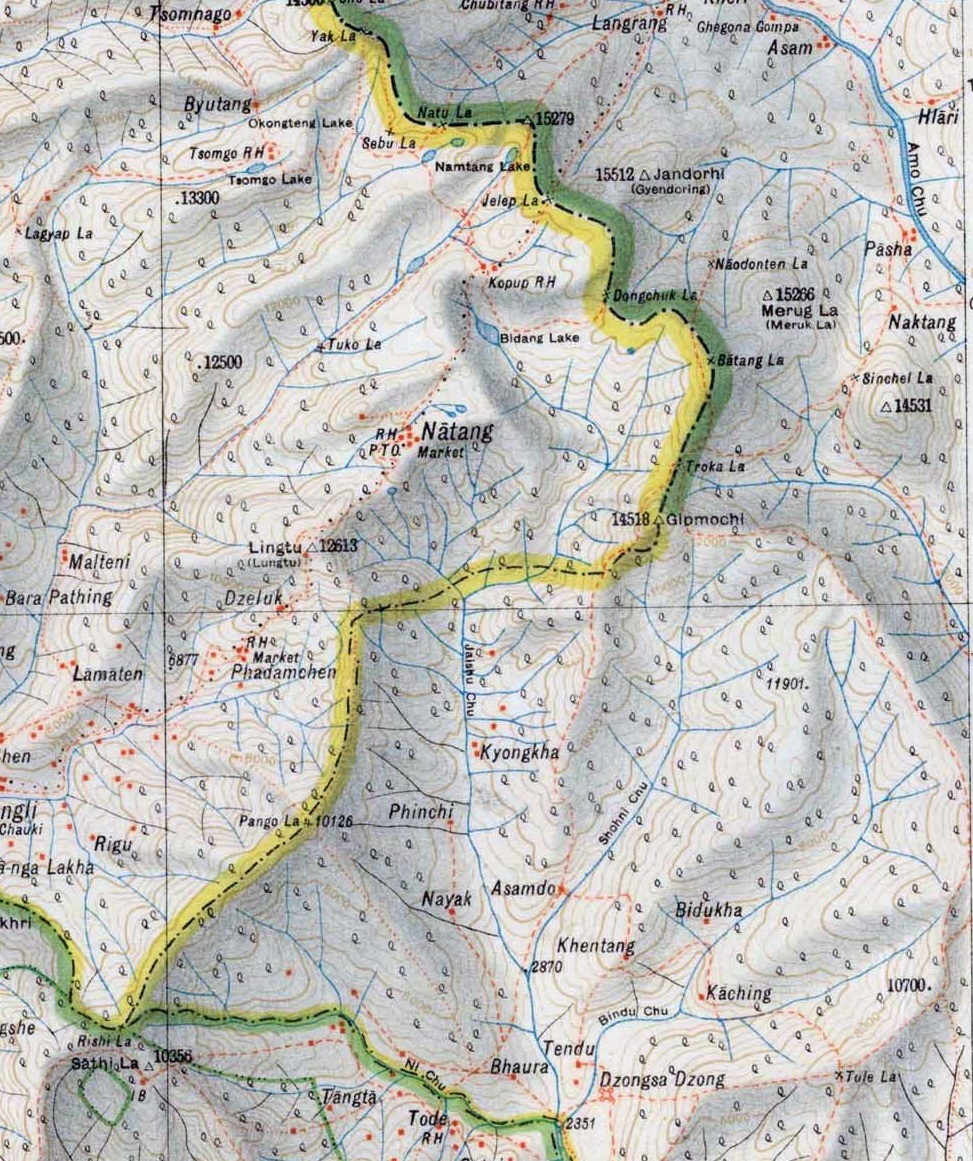
Map 5: 1923 Survey of India map of Sikkim border. Mount Gipmochi is correctly shown with respect to the Dongkya Range.

In the following decades, Sikkim established relations with the British East India Company and regained its lost territory with their help after an Anglo-Nepalese War. The British made Sikkim a de facto protectorate through the Treaty of Titalia (1817). The relations between Sikkim and the British remained rocky, and the Sikkimese retained loyalties to Tibet. Another treaty, Treaty of Tumlong in 1861, "confirmed" the protectorate status, and excluded Tibetan influence from Sikkim. The Tibetan effort to retain their own suzerainty resulted in a clash at the Lingtu mountain in 1888. China, which exercised nominal suzerainty over Tibet, stepped in and signed a treaty on behalf of Tibet.

==== Sikkim–Tibet boundary definition ====
The treaty agreed between Britain and China, called the Convention of Calcutta or the Anglo-Chinese treaty of 1890, recognised British suzerainty over Sikkim and delineated the boundary between Sikkim and Tibet. The border was defined as the watershed between Teesta River of Sikkim and Mochu of Tibet (on the Dongkya range), starting at "Mount Gipmochi". For today's point of view, what was meant by "Mount Gipmochi" is unclear as no land surveys of the area had been undertaken prior to the treaty. Travel maps and sketch maps available from that time period show no awareness of the Doklam plateau on the part of the British, placing Mount Gipmochi directly on the Dongkya range. (See Map 3.)

Continued Tibetan resistance to the acceptance of the Anglo-Chinese treaty eventually led to a British expedition to Tibet in 1904, under the political officer Francis Younghusband. The ensuing Convention of Lhasa obtained the Tibetan agreement to the earlier terms. The boundary established between Sikkim and Tibet in the treaty still survives today, according to scholar John Prescott.

==== Exploration of Doklam ====
In the course of the Younghusband expedition, Charles Bell was asked to lead a team investigating a supply route to Tibet through Bhutan, via the Amo Chu valley. The team travelled through Sipchu and Sangbay, and then, along an existing "goat track" on a mountain ridge, went up to the Doklam plateau. After reaching Mount Gipmochi, they descended to the Chumbi Valley through Sinchela. (Note: Bell did not indicate the route he took to Doklam. But, as can be seen on Map 5, there were two routes: one via the Zompelri ridge between the Dichu and Amo Chu basins (approaching Gipmochi from the east), and the other via the Lasa La ridge in the Dichu basin (approaching Gipmochi from the southwest).) This appears to have been the first instance of British exploration of the Doklam plateau.

Through this exploration, Bell discovered that the prevailing border between Bhutan and Tibet to the west of Amo Chu was a highland tree (Ya-shing) – lowland tree (Mön-shing) border over the same geographic region. The highland trees belonged to Tibet, perhaps above 11,500 ft in elevation, while the lowland trees belonged to Bhutan. (Note: Bell saw practical virtue in this arrangement, whereby the Tibetans would be able to graze their yaks and highland sheep, while the Bhutanese could make good use of bamboo from the lowlands.)

With the geography of the Doklam plateau becoming known, the later maps show a divergence. The official Survey of India map shows the correct location of Mount Gipmochi on the border of India, but without showing the borders of Bhutan, as per treaty. (Map 5) Unofficial maps often show Batang La peak—the peak corresponding to Gipmochi on the Dongkya Range—as the trijunction of the three countries. (Map 4 and 6.)

==== Relations between Bhutan and India ====
Bhutan became a protected state, though not a 'protectorate', of British India in 1910, an arrangement that was continued by independent India in 1949. Bhutan retained its independence in all internal matters and its borders were not demarcated until 1961. It is said that the Chinese cite maps from before 1912 to stake their claim over Doklam.

== Sino-Bhutanese border dispute at Doklam ==
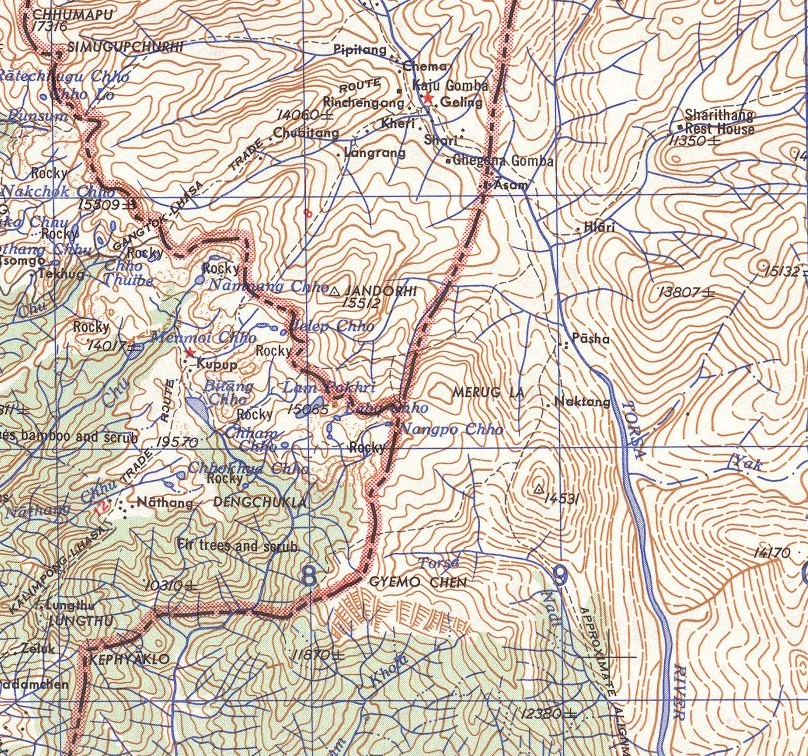
Map 6: China–Bhutan border in a survey map of US Army Map Service, 1955. From the trijunction at Batang La, the border goes north-northeast to the village of Asam, following a ridge line.

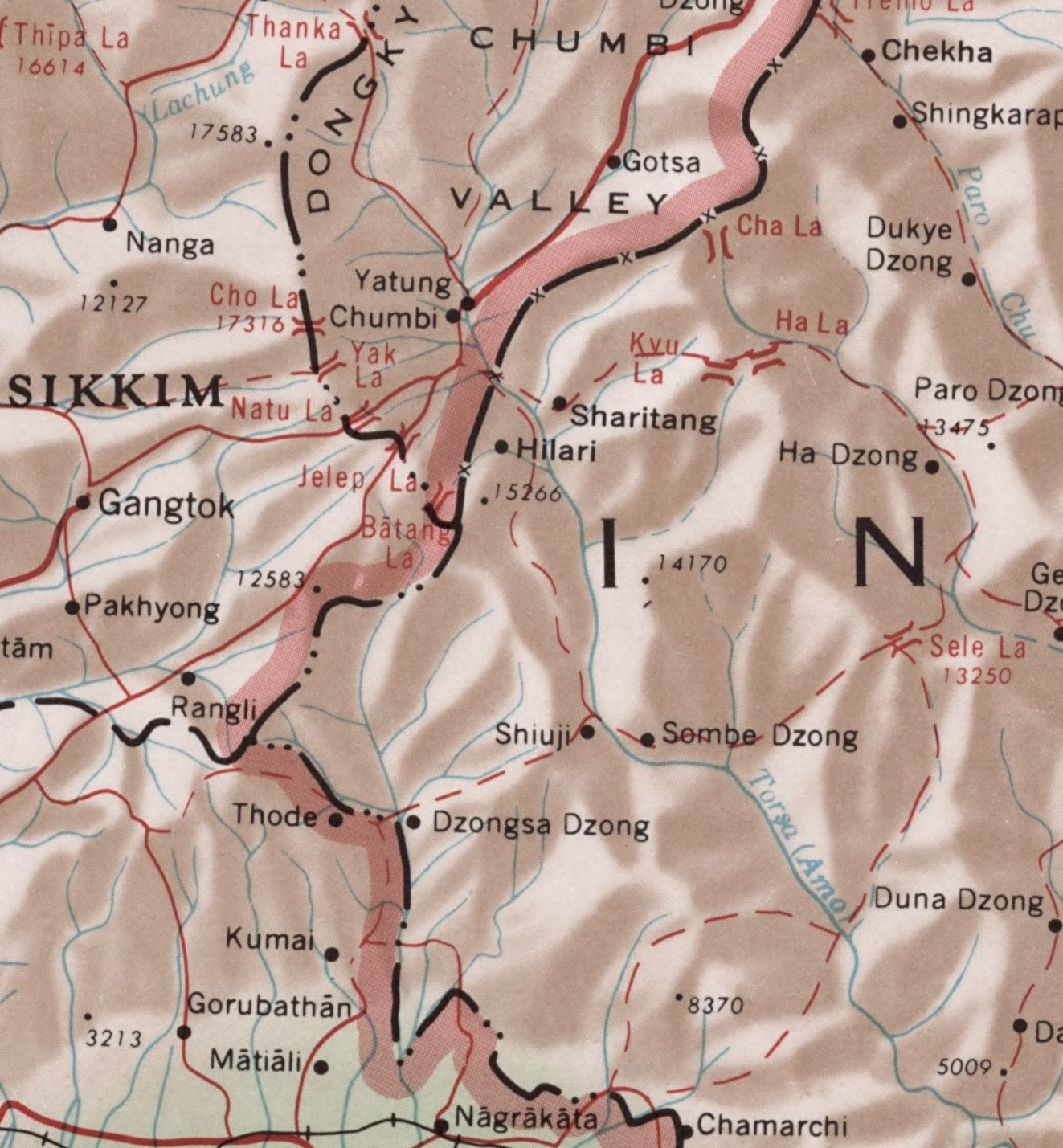
Map 7: China–Bhutan border in a CIA map, 1965

Map 8: Chinese road construction through Sinchela to Doka La, believed to have been carried out between 2004–2005. Other roads added after 2017.

Depictions of historical Chinese maps by the People's Republic of China show Sikkim and Bhutan as part of Tibet or China for a period of 1800 years, starting from the second century B.C., noted as dubious claims by scholars. (Note: Garver, Protracted Contest (2011, pp. 167–168): "As is the case of putative 'tributary relations' between China's imperial court and foreign rulers, independent scholars see modern Chinese historiography as deeply biased by nearly exclusive reliance on Chinese sources and a nationalist urge to demonstrate China's ancient influence over as wide-ranging an area as possible. Leo Rose's response to these Chinese views was that 'Sikkim and Bhutan were never under any form of control by the Chinese government, or, for that matter, of Tibet except for a short period in the nineteenth century.'") From 1958, Chinese maps started showing large parts of Bhutanese territory as part of China.

In 1960, China issued a statement claiming that Bhutan, Sikkim and Ladakh were part of a unified family in Tibet and had always been subject to the "great motherland of China". (Note: The statement attributed to Chang Kuow-Hua, the head of the Chinese Mission in Tibet, made in a public meeting in Lhasa on 17 July 1959: "Bhutanese, Sikkimise and Ladakhis formed a united family in Tibet; they have been subjects of Tibet and the great motherland of China and must once again be united and taught the Communist doctrine." This passage was apparently deleted from the version reported in China Today, but it was reported in The Daily Telegraph by George N. Patterson, its Kalimpong correspondent. Patterson reports that when Prime Minister Nehru raised the matter with China, "he was bluntly informed that China's claims to these border territories were based on the same claim as for their invasion of Tibet.") Alarmed, Bhutan closed off its border with China and shut all trade and diplomatic contacts. It also established formal defence arrangements with India.

=== 1960s ===
Starting August 1965, China and India traded accusations regarding intrusions into Doklam. China alleged that Indian troops were crossing into Doklam (which they called "Dognan") from Doka La, carrying out reconnaissance and intimidating Chinese herders. At first, the Indians paid no attention to the complaint. After several rounds of exchanges, on 30 September 1966, they forwarded a protest from the Bhutanese government which stated that Tibetan grazers were entering the pastures near the Doklam plateau accompanied by Chinese patrols. The letter asserted that the Doklam area was to the "south of the traditional boundary between Bhutan and the Tibet region" in the southern Chumbi area. On 3 October, the Government of Bhutan issued a press statement in which it said, "this area is traditionally part of Bhutan and no assertion has been made by the Government of the People's Republic of China disputing the traditional frontier which runs along recognizable natural features." (Note: A sample of exchanges: Government of China, 27 August 1965: "On July 3, at about 1900 hours, a group of five Indian soldiers crossed the China-Sikkim border and intruded into Dongnan grassland in Tibet, China. They carried out reconnaissance and harassment for as long as four days within Chinese territory before leaving China near Tungchu La at about 1300 hours on July 7."; Government of India, 2 September 1965: "No Indian soldier has crossed into Chinese territory. As a matter of fact, the Indian troops have strict instructions not to go beyond the boundary of Sikkim with Tibet."; Government of China, 31 January 1966: "...four Indian soldiers crossed Toka La and intruded into Tunglang pasture in Dongnan grassland, and with their weapons intimidated Chinese herdsmen who were grazing cattle there."; Government of India, 30 September 1966: "...the Government of Bhutan have requested the Government of India to draw the attention of the Chinese Government to a series of intrusions in the Doklan pasture area which lies south of the traditional boundary between Bhutan and the Tibet region of China in the southern Chumbi area.") (Note: Press Statement of 3 October 1966, issued on behalf of the Bhutan Government by its Trade Adviser in Calcutta: "His Majesty's Government of Bhutan had for some time, been concerned with reports received from its patrols of a number of intrusions by Tibetan graziers and Chinese troops in the Doklam pastures which are adjacent to the southern part of the Chumbi Valley. This area is traditionally part of Bhutan and no assertion has been made by the Government of the People's Republic of China disputing the traditional frontier which runs along recognizable natural features. In the area of the intrusion, the boundary runs along the water-parting along Batang La to Sinchel La. Local attempts were made to inform the graziers and the Chinese troops that they had strayed into Bhutanese territory but these have not been heeded.")

In response to the Indian protest, the Chinese government replied that Bhutan was a sovereign country and that China did not recognize any role for the Indian government in the matter. It asserted that the Doklam area had "always been under Chinese jurisdiction", that the Chinese herdsmen had "grazed cattle there for generations" and that the Bhutanese herdsmen had to pay pasturage to the Chinese side to graze cattle there. (Note: Hsinhua News Agency, 27 October 1966: "China has consistently respected Bhutan's sovereignty and territorial integrity....It is true that the China-Bhutan boundary has never been formally delimited and if the Bhutanese side's understanding is not quite the same as that of the Chinese side as regards the alignment of the boundary between the two countries at certain specific points, a fair and reasonable solution can very well be found through consultations on an equal footing... Nevertheless it must be explicitly pointed out that the boundary question between China and Bhutan is a matter that concerns China and Bhutan alone and has nothing to do with the Indian Government which has no right whatsoever to intervene in it.")

China later formally extended claims to 800 km^{2} (300 sq mi) of territory in northern Bhutan and areas north of Punakha, but apparently not in Doklam. Bhutan requested the Indian government to raise the matter with China. However, China rejected India's initiatives stating that the issue concerned China and Bhutan alone. Indian commentators state that the Chinese troops withdrew after a month and that the fracas over Doklam brought Bhutan even closer to India, resulting in the appointment of 3,400 Indian defence personnel in Bhutan for training the Bhutanese Army.

=== Border negotiations ===
Border negotiations between Bhutan and China began in 1972 with India's participation. However, China sought the exclusion of India. Bhutan commenced its own border negotiations with China in 1984. Prior to putting forward its claim line, it carried out its own surveys and produced maps that were approved by the National Assembly in 1989. Strategic expert Manoj Joshi states that the Bhutanese voluntarily shed territory in the process. Other scholars noted a reduction of 8,606 km^{2} (3,323 sq mi) area in the official Bhutanese maps. The Kula Kangri mountain, touted as the tallest peak in Bhutan, has apparently been ceded to China.

Bhutan said that, through the course of border talks, it had reduced 1,128 km^{2} (436 sq mi) of disputed border areas to 269 km^{2} (104 sq mi) by 1999. (Note: These figures appear to refer to areas along Bhutan's western border only.) In 1996, the Chinese negotiators offered a "package deal" to Bhutan, offering to give up claims on 495 km^{2} (191 sq mi) in the "central region" in exchange for 269 km^{2} (104 sq mi) in the "northwest", i.e., adjacent to the Chumbi valley, including Doklam, Sinchulumpa, Dramana and Shakhatoe. These areas would offer strategic depth to Chinese defences and access to the strategic Siliguri Corridor of India. Bhutan turned down the offer, reportedly under India's persuasion.

Having turned down China's package deal, in 2000, Bhutanese government put forward its original claim line of 1989. The talks could make no progress afterwards. The government reported that, in 2004, China started building roads in the border areas, leading to repeated protests by the Bhutanese government based on the 1998 Peace and Tranquility Agreement. According to a Bhutanese reporter, the most contested area has been the Doklam plateau.

Chinese built a road up the Sinchela pass (in undisputed territory) and then over the plateau (in disputed territory), leading up to the Doka La pass, until reaching within 68 metres to the Indian border post on the Sikkim border. Here, they constructed a turn-around facilitating vehicles to turn back. This road has been in existence at least since 2005. In 2007, there were reports of the Chinese having destroyed unmanned Indian forward posts on the Doklam plateau.

=== Anglo-Chinese Treaty ===
China claims the Doklam area as Chinese territory based on the Anglo-Chinese Treaty of 1890, negotiated between the British Empire in India and the Chinese resident in Tibet. Its purpose was to delineate the boundary between Sikkim and Tibet, and Bhutan was mentioned only in the offing. Article I of the treaty states:

The boundary of Sikkim and Tibet shall be the crest of the mountain range separating the waters flowing into the Sikkim Teesta and its affluents from the waters flowing into the Tibetan Mochu and northwards into other Rivers of Tibet. The line commences at Mount Gipmochi on the Bhutan frontier, and follows the above-mentioned water-parting to the point where it meets Nipal territory" .

— Anglo-Chinese treaty of 1890

The first sentence implies that Sikkim is to the south of the boundary and Tibet is to its north, which is the case at least at the eastern end of the boundary. The second sentence would imply that Bhutan is to the east, but does not state anything about the extent of Bhutan to the north. These statements would make good sense in the context of the geography assumed in the maps of that time, such as Map 3. But the actual geography (Map 5) impedes any further conclusions. Here, Tibet also extends to the east of Sikkim at Mount Gipmochi, which is not implied in the wording of the treaty. Moreover, waters flowing from Gipmochi, the presumed trijunction point, do not flow into Teesta. Neither do they flow "northwards" into the rivers of Tibet.

In addition to these inconsistencies, Bhutan was not a signatory to the treaty. It has no reason to be bound by its terms.

The Diplomat has commented that the continuous mountain crest or watershed mentioned in the first sentence of the 1890 treaty appears to begin very near Batang La, on the northern ridge of the Doklam plateau, and that this suggests a contradiction between the first and second sentences of Article I.

Scholar Srinath Raghavan has stated that the watershed principle in the first sentence implies that the Batang La–Merug La–Sinchela ridge should be the China–Bhutan border because both Merug La, at 15,266 feet (4,653 m), and Sinchela, at 14,531 feet (4,429 m), are higher than Gipmochi at 14,523 feet (4,427 m).

=== Bhutan and China border agreements 1988 and 1998 ===
Bhutan and China have held 24 rounds of boundary talks since it began in 1984. The Government of Bhutan claims that the Chinese road construction on the Doklam Plateau amounts to unilateral change to a disputed boundary in violation of the 1988 and 1998 agreements between the two nations. The agreements also prohibit the use of force and encourage both parties to strictly adhere to use peaceful means.

"Boundary talks are ongoing between Bhutan and China and we have written agreements of 1988 and 1998 stating that the two sides agree to maintain peace and tranquility in their border areas pending a final settlement on the boundary question, and to maintain status quo on the boundary as before March 1959. The agreements also state that the two sides will refrain from taking unilateral action, or use of force, to change the status quo of the boundary."

— Ministry of Foreign Affairs, Royal Government of Bhutan.

Notwithstanding the agreement, the PLA crossed into Bhutan in 1988 and took control of the Doklam plateau. There were reports of the PLA troops threatening the Bhutanese guards, declaring it to be Chinese soil, and seizing and occupying Bhutanese posts for extended periods. Again, after 2000, numerous intrusions, grazing and road and infrastructure construction by the Chinese were reported in the Bhutanese National Assembly.

== 2017 Doklam standoff ==
Map 9: Doka La – the site of Doklam standoff

In June 2017, Doka La became the site of a stand-off between the armed forces of India and China following an attempt by China to extend a road coming via Sinchela further southward on the Doklam plateau. India does not have a claim on Doklam but it supports Bhutan's claim on the territory. According to the Bhutanese government, China attempted to extend the road that previously terminated at Doka La towards the Bhutan Army camp at Zompelri 2 km (1.2 mi) to the south; that ridge, viewed as the border by China but as within Bhutan by both Bhutan and India, extends eastward overlooking India's strategic Siliguri Corridor.

On 18 June, Indian troops crossed into the territory in dispute between China and Bhutan in an attempt to prevent the road construction. India's entry into the dispute is explained by the extant relations between India and Bhutan. In a 1949 treaty, Bhutan agreed to let India guide its foreign policy and defence affairs, reminiscent of its protected state status during the British colonial rule. In 2007, that treaty was superseded by a new friendship treaty which allows freedom of foreign policy to Bhutan, but mandates cooperation in issues of national security interest.

India has criticised China for "crossing the border" and attempting to construct a road (allegedly done "illegally"), while China has criticised India for entering its "territory".

On 29 June 2017, Bhutan protested the Chinese construction of a road in the disputed territory. The Bhutanese border was put on high alert and border security was tightened as a result of the growing tensions. On the same day, China released a map depicting Doklam as part of China, claiming, via the map, that all territory up to Gipmochi belonged to China by the 1890 Anglo-Chinese treaty.

On 3 July 2017, China told India that former Prime Minister of India Jawaharlal Nehru accepted the 1890 Britain-China treaty. Contrary to Chinese claim, Nehru's 26 September 1959 letter to Zhou Enlai, stated that the 1890 treaty defined only the northern part of the Sikkim–Tibet border and not the trijunction area. He called for discussion on the "rectification of errors in Chinese maps" regarding the boundary with Bhutan.

China claimed on 5 July 2017 that there was a "basic consensus" between China and Bhutan that Doklam belonged to China, and there was no dispute between the two countries. The Bhutanese government in August 2017 denied that it had relinquished its claim to Doklam.

In a 15-page statement released on 1 August 2017, the Foreign Ministry in Beijing accused India of using Bhutan as "a pretext" to interfere and impede the boundary talks between China and Bhutan. The report referred to India's "trespassing" into Doklam as a violation of the territorial sovereignty of China as well as a challenge to the sovereignty and independence of Bhutan.

=== Chinese position ===
The Chinese government maintains that, from historical evidence, Donglang (Doklam) has always been traditional pasture area for the border inhabitants of Yadong, a county in its autonomous region of Tibet, and that China had exercised good administration over the area. It also says that before the 1960s, if the border inhabitants of Bhutan wanted to herd in Doklam, they needed the consent of the Chinese side and had to pay the grass tax to China.

=== Bhutanese reactions ===
After issuing a press statement on 29 June 2017, the Bhutanese government and media maintained a studious silence. The Bhutanese clarified that the land on which China was building a road was "Bhutanese territory" that was being claimed by China, and it is part of the ongoing border negotiations. It defended the policy of silence followed by the Bhutanese government, saying "Bhutan does not want India and China to go to war, and it is avoiding doing anything that can heat up an already heated situation."

However, ENODO Global, having done a study of social media interactions in Bhutan, recommended that the government should "proactively engage" with citizens and avoid a disconnect between leaders and populations. ENODO found considerable anxiety among the populace regarding the risk of war between India and China, and the possibility of annexation by China similar to that of Tibet in 1951. It found a strengthening of Bhutanese resolve, identity and nationalism, not wanting to be "pushovers".

The New York Times said that it encountered more people concerned about India's actions than China's. It found expressions of sovereignty and concern that an escalation of the border conflict would hurt trade and diplomatic relations with China. ENODO did not corroborate these observations. Rather it said that hundreds of Twitter hashtags were created to rally support for India and that there was a significant blowback over the Xinhua television programme titled "7 sins" that castigated India. Scholar Rudra Chaudhuri, having toured the country, noted that Doklam is not as important an issue for the Bhutanese as it might have been ten years ago. Rather the Bhutanese view a border settlement with China as the top priority for the country. While he noticed terms such as "pro-Chinese" and "anti-Indian" often used, he said that what they meant was not well-understood.

=== Disengagement ===
On 28 August 2017, it was announced that India and China had mutually agreed to a speedy disengagement on the Doklam plateau bringing an end to the military face-off that lasted for close to three months. The Chinese foreign ministry sidestepped the question of whether China would continue the road construction.

=== Aftermath ===
Chinese forces reportedly returned to Doklam Plateau in September 2018 and had nearly completed their road construction by January 2019, along with other infrastructure. On 19 November 2020, a Chinese CGTN News producer tweeted that China has constructed a village called Pangda approximately 9 km (5.6 mi) from the Doklam standoff location and about 2 km (1.2 mi) within the territory of Bhutan.

== Tourism ==
The Chinese government has opened the Doklam area to tourism, allowing citizens to travel by sightseeing bus to visit attractions such as Pangda Village and the Linhai Galaxy Waterfall. Villagers in Pangda Village have opened guesthouses and restaurants to receive tourists.

Doklam is part of the Bharat Ranbhoomi Darshan initiative of the Indian Military which details 77 battleground war memorials in the border area. These include the Longewala War Memorial, Sadhewala War Memorial, and memorials at Siachen base camp, Kargil, Galwan, Pangong Tso, Rezang La, Bum La, Cho La, and Kibithu.

== See also ==
- Bhutan–China Sakteng border dispute
- Bhutan–China border
- Bhutan–China relations
- Bhutan–India relations
- China–India relations
- Sino-Indian border dispute
- Five Fingers of Tibet
- China's salami slicing

== Bibliography ==
Secondary sources

- Bajpai, G. S. (1999), China's Shadow Over Sikkim: The Politics of Intimidation, Lancer Publishers, ISBN 978-1-897829-52-3
- Chandran, D. Suba; Singh, Bhavna (2015), India, China and Sub-regional Connectivities in South Asia, SAGE Publications, ISBN 978-93-5150-326-2
- Collister, Peter (1987), Bhutan and the British, London: Serindia Publications with Belitha Press
- Fravel, M. Taylor (2008), Strong Borders, Secure Nation: Cooperation and Conflict in China's Territorial Disputes, Princeton University Press, ISBN 978-1-4008-2887-6
- Garver, John W. (2011), Protracted Contest: Sino-Indian Rivalry in the Twentieth Century, University of Washington Press, ISBN 978-0-295-80120-9
- Harris, George L. (1977) [first published by American University, 1964], Area Handbook for Nepal, Bhutan and Sikkim (second ed.), U.S. Government Printing Office
- Hutt, Michael (2003), Unbecoming Citizens: Culture, Nationhood, and the Flight of Refugees from Bhutan, Oxford University Press, ISBN 9780195662054
- Joshi, Manoj (2017), Doklam: To start at the very beginning, Observer Research Foundation
- Kumar, Pranav; Acharya, Alka; Jacob, Jabin T. (2011). "Sino-Bhutanese Relations". China Report. 46 (3): 243–252. doi:10.1177/000944551104600306. ISSN 0009-4455. S2CID 153382221.
- Lama, Jigme Yeshe (2022), "Dragon Meets Dragon: Bhutan-China Relationship", in Anita Sengupta; Priya Singh (eds.), Asia Matters, Vol. 2 (PDF), Asia in Global Affairs, pp. 54–63
- Mathou, Thierry (2004), "Bhutan–China Relations: Towards a New step in Himalayan Politics" (PDF), The Spider and The Piglet: Proceedings of the First International Seminar on Bhutanese Studies, Thimpu: The Centre for Bhutan Studies
- Mehra, P. L. (2005), "Sikkim and Bhutan—An Historical Conspectus", in Suresh Kant Sharma; Usha Sharma (eds.), Discovery of North-East India: Geography, History, Culture, Religion, Politics, Sociology, Science, Education and Economy. Sikkim. Volume 10., Mittal Publications, pp. 125–154, ISBN 978-81-8324-044-4
- Mullard, Saul (2011), Opening the Hidden Land: State Formation and the Construction of Sikkimese History, BRILL, ISBN 978-90-04-20895-7
- Penjore, Dorji (2004), "Security of Bhutan: walking between the giants" (PDF), Journal of Bhutan Studies
- Phuntsho, Karma (2013), The History of Bhutan, Random House India, ISBN 978-81-8400-411-3
- Phuntsho, Jigme (Winter 2017), "Rhetoric and Reality of Doklam Incident" (PDF), Journal of Bhutan Studies, 37
- Prescott, John Robert Victor (1975), Map of Mainland Asia by Treaty, Melbourne University Press, ISBN 978-0-522-84083-4
- Rose, Leo E. (1971), Nepal – Strategy for Survival, University of California Press, ISBN 978-0-520-01643-9
- Shakabpa, Tsepon Wangchuk Deden (1984) [first published Yale University Press 1967], Tibet: A Political History, New York: Potala Publications, ISBN 978-0-9611474-0-2
- Singh, Amar Kaur Jasbir (1988), Himalayan Triangle: A historical survey of British India's relations with Tibet, Sikkim, and Bhutan, 1765-1950, British Library, ISBN 9780712306300
- Singh, Mandip (2013), Critical Assessment of China's Vulnerabilities in Tibet (PDF), Institute for Defence Studies & Analyses, ISBN 978-93-82169-10-9
- Smith, Paul J. (2015), "Bhutan–China Border Disputes and Their Geopolitical Implications", in Bruce Elleman; Stephen Kotkin; Clive Schofield (eds.), Beijing's Power and China's Borders: Twenty Neighbors in Asia, M.E. Sharpe, pp. 23–36, ISBN 978-0-7656-2766-7
- Van Praagh, David (2003), Greater Game: India's Race with Destiny and China, McGill-Queen's Press - MQUP, pp. 349–, ISBN 978-0-7735-7130-3
- Walcott, Susan M. (2010), "Bordering the Eastern Himalaya: Boundaries, Passes, Power Contestations" (PDF), Geopolitics, 15: 62–81, doi:10.1080/14650040903420396, S2CID 144252954

Primary sources

- China Foreign Ministry (2 August 2017), The Facts and China's Position Concerning the Indian Border Troops' Crossing of the China-India Boundary in the Sikkim Sector into the Chinese Territory (2017-08-02) (PDF), Government of China
- India. Ministry of External Affairs, ed. (1966), Notes, Memoranda and Letters Exchanged Between the Governments of India and China, January 1965–February 1966, White Paper No. XII (PDF)
- India. Ministry of External Affairs, ed. (1967), Notes, Memoranda and Letters Exchanged Between the Governments of India and China, February 1966–February 1967, White Paper No. XIII (PDF)
- India. Ministry of External Affairs, ed. (1968), Notes, Memoranda and Letters Exchanged Between the Governments of India and China, February 1967–April 1968, White Paper No. XIV (PDF)
- Bell, Charles (1924), Tibet Past and Present (First ed.), Oxford University Press
- Bell, Charles (1946), Portrait of the Dalai Lama, London: Collins
