= Bhutan–China relations =

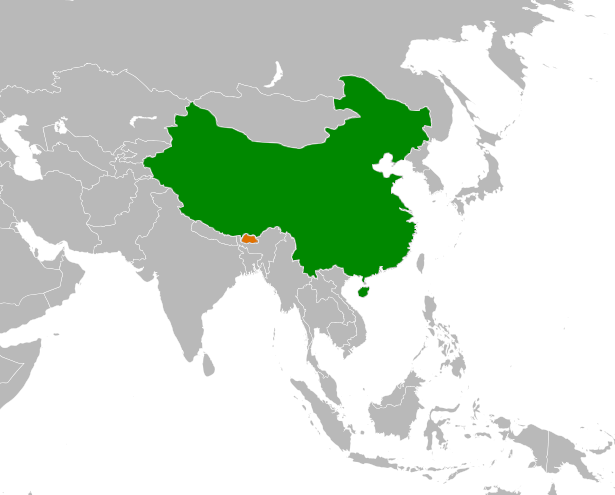
- China: Bhutan

Bhutan–China relations are the international relations between the Kingdom of Bhutan and the People's Republic of China. As of present, Bhutan and China do not share an official diplomatic relationship with one another. Nevertheless, unofficial ties exist.

Historically, Bhutan has followed a path of isolationism and non-alignment extending from the Cold War era to the present day. Bhutan's lack of formal diplomatic relations extend far beyond China; Bhutan does not have an official diplomatic relationship with any of the other four permanent member states of the United Nations Security Council. Despite the lack of diplomatic relations, Bhutan adheres to the one-China policy, recognizing the PRC as the sole legitimate government of China and supporting China's position on issues such as Taiwan and Tibet.

Geographically, Bhutan is sandwiched between the two neighbouring states of India to the south and China to the north and northeast. The Bhutan–China border runs approximately 477 km across very mountainous Himalayan terrain, connecting northern regions of Bhutan on the south of the border with the Tibet Autonomous Region of China north of the border. The Bhutan–China border is porous and poorly demarcated, and has been a source of long running tension between the two states. Territorial disputes with Bhutan have been a source of potential conflict. Since 1984, the two governments have conducted regular talks on border and security issues to reduce tensions.

The 2026 "Happy Chinese New Year" Bhutan Session was held in Thimphu from February 12–13, hosted by the Chinese Embassy in India and Bhutan's Ministry of Home Affairs. The event featured a performance of Zhejiang Wu Opera and attended by Bhutanese royalty, government officials, and around 400 guests. Ambassador Xu Feihong delivered remarks emphasizing China-Bhutan friendship and cooperation. The session celebrated the Chinese Bingwu Year of the Horse and Bhutanese Fire Horse Year.

== Background ==
Bhutan has long had strong cultural, historical, religious, and economic connections to Tibet. Bhutan was a tributary state of the Qing dynasty. The Republic of China officially maintains a territorial claim on parts of Bhutan. Relations with Tibet were strained when China took over Tibet in the 1950s. Unlike Tibet, Bhutan had no history of being under the suzerainty or direct rule of China but fell under British suzerainty during the British Raj following the Treaty of Punakha in 1910.

Bhutan's border with Tibet has never been officially demarcated. The territorial claim was maintained by the People's Republic of China after the Chinese Communist Party took control of mainland China in the Chinese Civil War. With the increase in soldiers on the Chinese side of the Sino-Bhutanese border after the 17-point agreement between the Tibetan government and the central government of the PRC, Bhutan withdrew its representative from Lhasa.

The 1959 Tibetan uprising and the 14th Dalai Lama's arrival in neighboring India made the security of Bhutan's border with China a necessity for Bhutan. An estimated 6,000 Tibetans fled to Bhutan and were granted asylum, although Bhutan subsequently closed its northern border with China, fearing more refugees.

Bhutan–China relations are constrained also by Bhutan's close relationship with India. Nonetheless, relations with China have improved following China's Belt and Road Initiative. Generally, Bhutan seeks balance with its larger neighbors China and India in order to avoid dependency on either country.

== History ==
Bhutan has historical ties to Tibet through their culture, history, religion, and economy. However, their relationship became tense after Bhutan supported the British Empire and the British invasion of Tibet. With the signing of an agreement between the People's Republic of China and the Tibetan locals, and the deployment of troops on the border between China and Bhutan, Bhutan withdrew its representatives in the People's Republic of China from Lhasa. After the 1959 Tibetan uprising and the arrival of the Dalai Lama in neighbouring India, some 6,000 Tibetans fled to Bhutan and were granted asylum. Bhutan closed its border with China, afraid that there would be more refugees.

=== Boundary issues ===
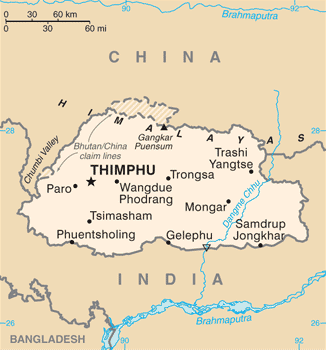
Map of Bhutan showing border with China as of 2010

With the entry of the People's Liberation Army into Tibet, some Tibetan settlements in western Tibet, formerly controlled by the Bhutanese government, came under the control of the People's Republic of China. While some sources believe that the Bhutan–China border was settled in a secret agreement during 1961, neither country has ever publicly acknowledged such an agreement. In the 1980s, Bhutan relinquished its claim to a 154-square-mile area called Kula Khari on its northern border with China. In 1998, the two countries signed a peace and tranquility agreement, although border disputes remain. A 2002 official statement by the King of Bhutan to the National Assembly, specifies that there are still four disputed areas between Bhutan and China.

The two countries signed a memorandum of understanding in 2022 to begin the process of settling the border. In 2023, Bhutanese foreign minister Tandi Dorji met with Chinese foreign minister Wang Yi and Chinese Vice President Han Zheng where both sides indicated hopes to resolve the border dispute and develop formal ties.

In 2025, Bhutan referred to Tibet as "Xizang" in an official statement, sparking criticism from Tibetan groups alleging that the term erases Tibetan identity.

=== Mitigation ===
In 1974, Bhutan invited Ma Muming, chargé d'affaires of the Chinese Embassy in India, to attend the coronation of the fourth Bhutanese King Jigme Singye Wangchuck. In 1983, Chinese Foreign Minister Wu Xueqian and Bhutanese Foreign Minister Dawa Tsering held talks in New York on establishing bilateral relations. In 1984, China and Bhutan began direct negotiations on the border dispute.

In 1998, China and Bhutan signed an Agreement to Maintain Peace and Tranquility on the Bhutan–China border. The two sides also proposed the Five Principles of Peaceful Coexistence. However, China later built roads in the territory claimed by Bhutan, and China was accused of violating the agreement and provoking tension. In 2024, The New York Times reported that, according to satellite imagery, China had constructed villages inside of disputed territory within Bhutan. Chinese individuals, called "border guardians," received annual subsidies to relocate to newly built villages and paid to conduct border patrols. At least 22 Chinese villages and settlements have been constructed inside of disputed territory.

== See also ==
- Bhutan–India relations
- Five Fingers of Tibet, claims to Bhutan and other nearby territories made by PRC leader Mao Zedong
- Territorial disputes of the People's Republic of China
