= Damthang =

- Location in Bhutan
- Coordinates: 27.4364°N 89.2031°E
- Country: Bhutan
- District: Haa District
- Time zone: UTC+6 (BTT)

Damthang is a town in Haa District in western Bhutan. It is located in the Ha Valley, 11 km from the Ha town and 75 km from the Paro Airport.

Damthang is the location of the Royal Bhutan Army's China-focused base to protect disputed pasture lands at Doklam (site of 2017 China–India border standoff on India-Bhutan-China tri-junction), Sinchulumpa, Charithang and Dramana, all of which are at an aerial distance of 15 km or a two-day trek for foot-mounted troops. Indian Army has a training mission at the Ha district headquarter.

== See also ==
- Gangtok
- Bhutan–India relations
- Bhutan–India border
- Bhutan–China border
- Line of Actual Control
