= Bji Gewog =

Bji Gewog སྦྱིས་
- Gewogs
- Interactive map of Bji Gewog
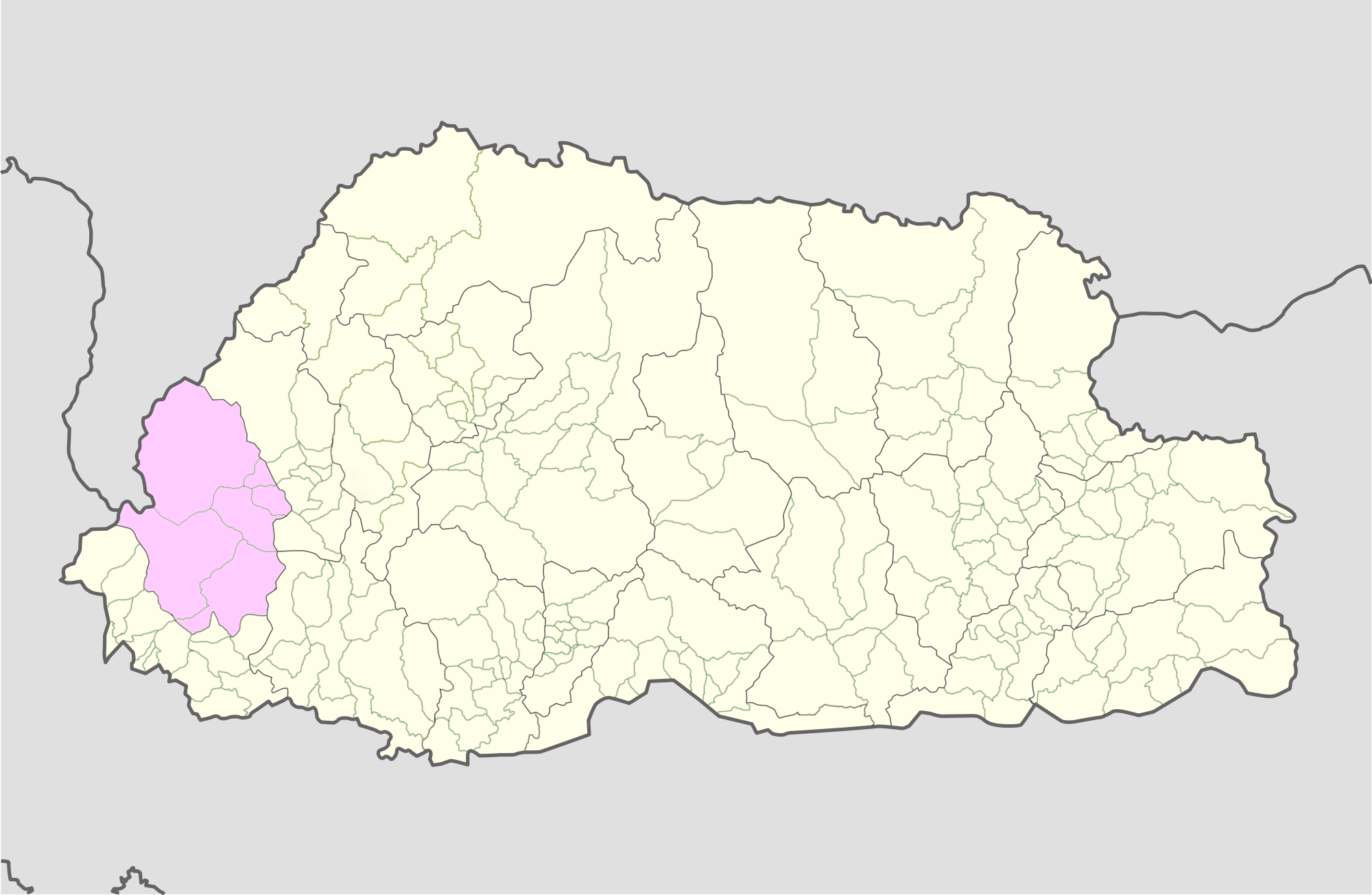
- Bji Gewog in Bhutan's Haa district
- Coordinates: 27°28′28″N 89°11′30″E
- Country: Bhutan
- District: Haa District

Area
  - Total: 802.2 km^{2} (309.7 sq mi)

Population (2017)
  - Total: 3,230
  - Density: 4.03/km^{2} (10.4/sq mi)
- Time zone: UTC+6 (BTT)

Bji Gewog (Note: Alternative spellings: Bje and Bjee.) (Dzongkha: སྦྱིས་) is a gewog (village block) of Haa District, Bhutan. It is the northernmost gewog of the Haa District, bordering China's Chumbi Valley (Yadong County). The gewog has mostly mountainous terrain, with rivers flowing into Amo Chu in the west and the Haa Chu in the east. China claims a large part of the gewog as its territory and has recently started building roads and villages in the border areas.

== Geography ==
In 2002, the Ninth Plan document reported that the Bji Gewog had an area of 832 square kilometres and contained 234 households in 8 villages. In 2013, in the Eleventh Plan document, the area was reported as 802.2 square kilometres. The reduction of 30 square kilometres is attributable to a possible cession of the Kongbu region to China. It is not being shown as belonging to Bhutan in the current maps.

The Bji Gewog mostly consists of mountainous terrain, with mountains belonging to the Massang-Chungdung range (also called Jomolhari range). The western part of the gewog is part of the Amo Chu river basin, with a series of tributary rivers rising in the range and flowing into Amo Chu. The eastern part of the gewog is part of the Haa River basin. The lower portion of the Haa River valley, below the Damthang camp is well-populated. (Map 2)

=== Amo Chu basin ===
The Amo Chu basin in the gewog is part of Torsa national forest and is designated as a "strict nature reserve". There is no permanent habitation in the area, but the area is open for grazing by pastoral nomads, who use several campsites for their halts.

Map 2: Rivers of the Bji Gewog

The rivers flowing into Amo Chu are, from the north to south, Shakhatoe (or Sharkhatoe), Dramana, Langmarpo, Charitang (or Sharitang), Gambala Chu, and Yak Chu. (Map 2)

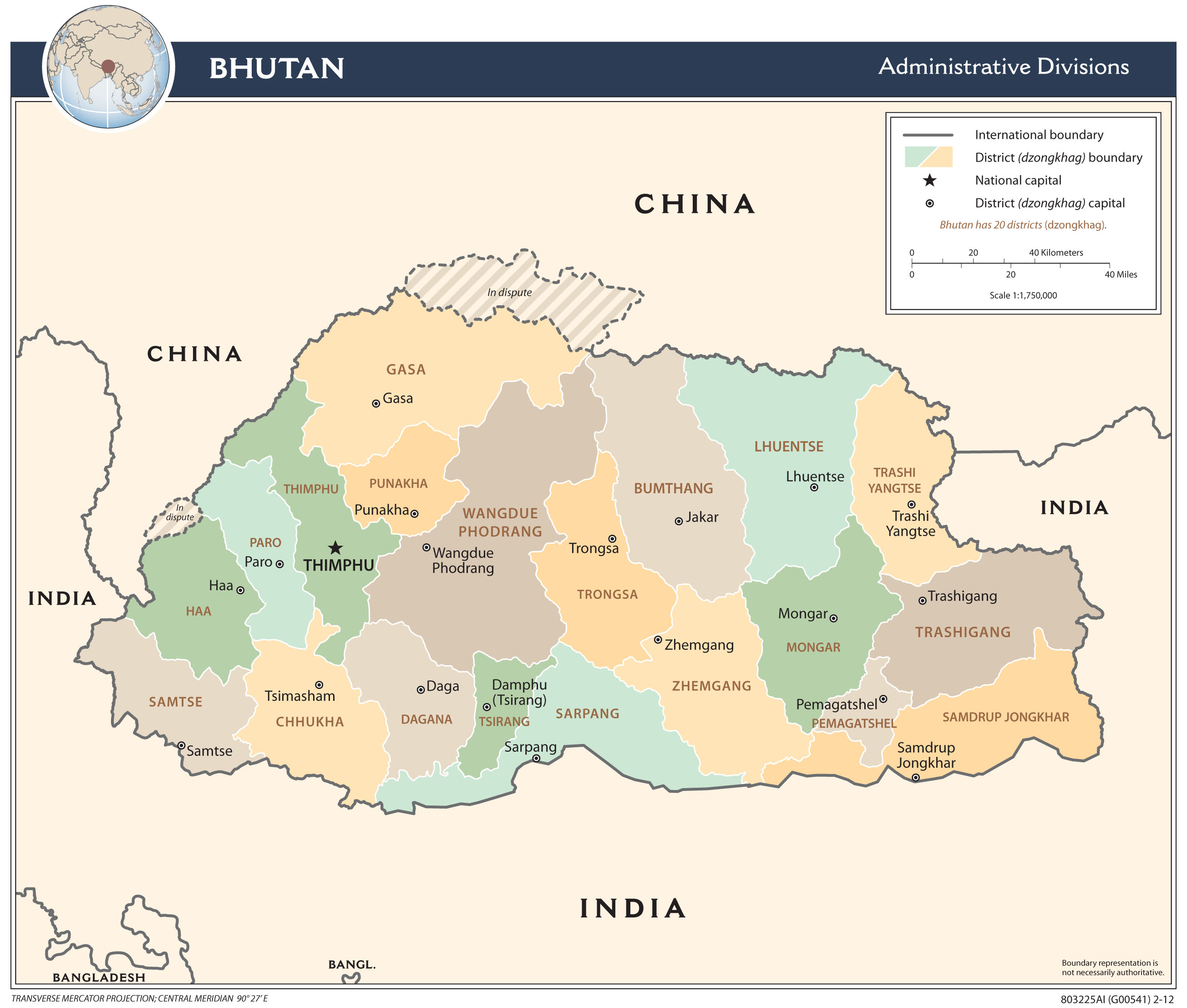
Map 3: A CIA map of Bhutan, 2015. Dramana and Shakhatoe marked as forming a disputed area at the northwest of the Haa District

The Dramana and Shakhatoe valleys have been recognised by Bhutan as forming a disputed area. Said to measure a combined area of 138 square kilometres, the valleys are included in Bhutanese territory, but marked as disputed on maps published after 1989 (Map 3). According to Bhutan's secretary for international boundaries, the pastures of Shakhatoe had always been used by the yak herders of the Haa district. Since August 2004, China has started building its own motor roads in the region, disregarding Bhutanese protests. By 2022, Chinese occupation of the region seems complete, with a trunk road running through the area, with several branch roads and multiple built-up townships. (Note: In 2010, the secretary for international boundaries mentioned only Dramana as being in dispute without any mention of Shakhatoe.)

The Langmarpo river is the longest of the tributary rivers. The lower western portion of its valley, with a stream called Kongbu (Chinese: 空布), appears to have been ceded by Bhutan to China by 2018. The remaining course of the Langmarpo Chu has not been ceded but is under effective occupation of China with a highway and several villages constructed along it. China has also constructed a road in the eastern part of the valley towards the Phutegang ridge, where it overlooks the Charitang valley. Further up along its course, there is a high plateau with several small lakes at elevations ranging from 3700 to 4400 metres. It is referred to as Sinchulung or Sinchulungpa (Note: Alternative spellings: Sinchulumpa and Sinchulumba.) by the Bhutanese. It is said to measure 42 square kilometres, and is part of the 269 square kilometre area that China included in its "package deal" for border settlement. (Note: The "package deal" reportedly offered by China in 1990 was to trade Chinese claims to 495 square kilometres along the northern border for Bhutanese claims to 269 square kilometres adjacent to the Chumbi Valley. Bhutan is said to have turned down the offer. The package deal is always presented as if it constitutes a full settlement of the border dispute, but there is no explicit statement to this effect. Other Chinese encroachments into the Langmarpo and Charitang valleys call this implication into question.)

The Charitang valley has formed the traditional trade route between the Chumbi Valley and Bhutan. It has a camp at Dolepchen at the base of the valley, a Charitang guest house along the way, and two passes called Kyu La (or Chu La) and Ha La at the top, which must be crossed before entering the Haa Valley where a camp called Damthang is located. Damthang is connected to the Ha Town by a motorable road.

The Yak Chu river in the south covers a considerably large basin. China calls this river Lulin Chu (Chinese: 鲁林曲) and uses the name "Lulin" to describe the region covering both the Charitang and Yak Chu basins.

At the southwestern end, the Amo Chu river forms the border of the Bji Gewog. China's Chumbi Valley begins near the Sinchela Pass according to Bhutan's border definition. From this point, the western bank of the river belongs to China, while the eastern bank is part of the Bji gewog.

To the south of Bji Gewog lies the Sangbay Gewog, where again China claims the area called Doklam, which includes the Doklam plateau and the Torsa Nala basin.

=== Haa Chu basin ===
The Haa river is deemed to originate below the Khungdugang peak, which extends to an elevation of 18,730 feet (5,710 m). It is the second tallest peak in the Massang-Chungdung range after Chomolhari. Two streams originate below the mountain, flowing west and east, and join near the Damthang camp. The result of their merger is the Haa Chu river.

Below Damthang, the Haa Chu valley broadens, containing numerous villages with farmlands. In a branch valley running northeast, there are further villages, and a path to Saga La, allowing one to cross into the Paro Valley near Drukyel Dzong.

== Demographics ==
According to the current demographic data based on the 2017 census, the Bji Gewog has a population of 3,230 living in 23 villages. (Note: The growth in the number is due to recognising remote mountain settlements as independent villages. The bulk of the population continues to live in the farming villages in the Haa Valley.) This appears to be a steep rise from the data reported in the 2002 Plan document. (The simplest explanation is the pastoral nomads in the region are now being counted more effectively.) The villages are grouped into five chiwogs (village blocks), viz., Taloong, Yangthang, Chumpa, Gyansa, and Chempa.

The majority of the population is involved in farming and pastoralism. Wheat, potatoes and vegetables are cultivated, and the surplus is sold in markets in the Ha Town.

According to the district administration, most people are well-off.
