= Bhutan–China border =

International border

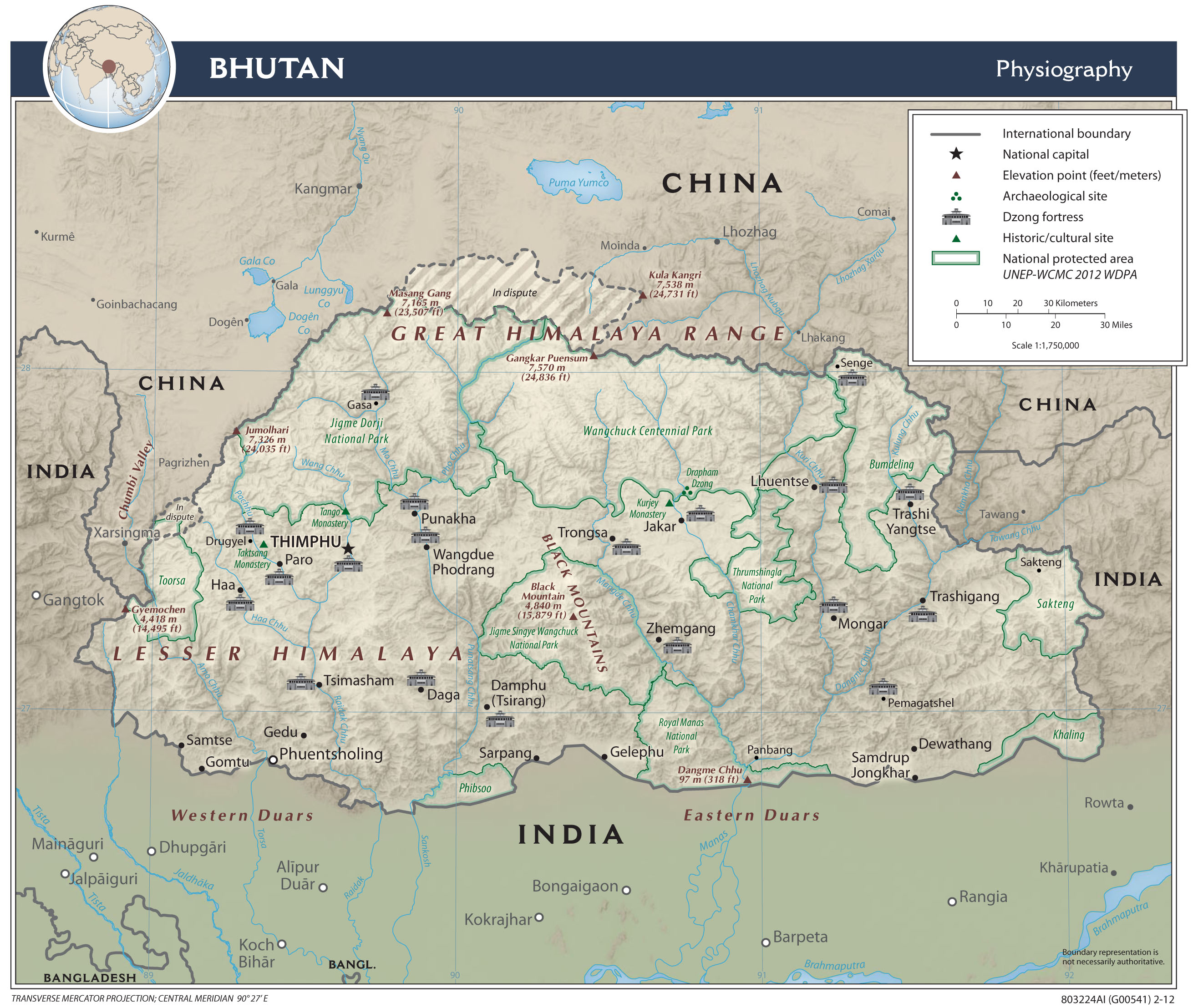
Map of Bhutan, with China to the north

The Bhutan–China border is a partially disputed boundary between Bhutan and China, running for 477 km (296 mi) through the Himalayas between the two tripoints with India. China claims areas totaling 1,504 km^{2} along the border, including parts considered Bhutanese by India, and has built roads and military outposts in the vicinities.

== Description ==
The border starts in the west at the western tripoint with India just north of Mount Gipmochi. It then proceeds overland to the north-east, across mountains such as Jomolhari (part of this stretch is disputed). The border turns east near Mount Masang Gang, though a large stretch of this section is also in dispute. Near the town of Singye Dzong it turns broadly southeastward, terminating at the eastern tripoint with India. The only land crossing between Bhutan and China is a secret road/trail connecting Tsento Gewog and Phari (27.698912°N 89.189139°E) known as Tremo La.

== History ==
The Kingdom of Bhutan and the People's Republic of China do not maintain official diplomatic relations, and relations are historically tense.

Bhutan's border with Tibet has never been officially recognised and demarcated. Bhutan was a tributary state of the Qing dynasty. Taiwan officially maintains a territorial claim on parts of Bhutan. In 1930, Mao Zedong named Bhutan as falling within "the correct boundaries of China" and would allegedly later include it in the Five Fingers of Tibet. The territorial claim was maintained by the People's Republic of China after the Chinese Communist Party took control of mainland China in the Chinese Civil War in 1949. In 1959, China released a map in A brief history of China where considerable portions of Bhutan as well as other countries was included in its territorial claims.

With the increase in soldiers on the Chinese side of the Sino-Bhutanese border after the 17-point agreement between the local Tibetan government and the central government of the PRC in 1951, Bhutan withdrew its representative from Lhasa.

The 1959 Tibetan Rebellion and the 14th Dalai Lama's arrival in neighbouring India made the security of Bhutan's border with China a necessity for Bhutan. An estimated 6,000 Tibetans fled to Bhutan and were granted asylum, although Bhutan subsequently closed its border to China, fearing more refugees to come. In July 1959, along with the occupation of Tibet, the Chinese People's Liberation Army occupied several Bhutanese exclaves in western Tibet which were under Bhutanese administration for more than 300 years and had been given to Bhutan by Ngawang Namgyal in the 17th century. These included Darchen, Labrang Monastery, Gartok and several smaller monasteries and villages near Mount Kailas.

A Chinese map published in 1961 showed China claiming territories in Bhutan, Nepal and the Kingdom of Sikkim (now a state of India). Incursions by Chinese soldiers and Tibetan herdsmen also provoked tensions in Bhutan. Imposing a cross-border trade embargo and closing the border, Bhutan established extensive military ties with India.

During the 1962 Sino-Indian War, Bhutanese authorities permitted Indian troop movements through Bhutanese territory. However, the inconclusive end of the war raised concerns about India's ability to defend Bhutan. Consequently, while building its ties with India, Bhutan officially established a policy of neutrality. According to official statements by the King of Bhutan to the National Assembly, there are four disputed areas between Bhutan and China. Starting from Doklam in the west, the border goes along the mountain ridges from Gamochen to Batangla, Sinchela, and down to the Amo Chhu. The disputed area in Doklam covers 89 square kilometers (km^{2}), while the disputed areas in Sinchulumpa and Gieu cover about 180 km^{2}.

Until the 1970s, India represented Bhutan's concerns in talks with China over the broader Sino-Indian border conflicts. Obtaining membership in the United Nations in 1971, Bhutan began to take a more independent course in its foreign policy. In the U.N., Bhutan, incidentally alongside India, voted in favor of the PRC filling the seat occupied by the ROC and openly supported the "One China" policy. In 1974 in a symbolic overture, Bhutan invited the Chinese ambassador to India to attend the coronation of Jigme Singye Wangchuk as the king of Bhutan. In the 1980s, Bhutan relinquished its claim to a 154 square miles (400 km^{2}) area called Kula Khari on its northern border with China. In 1983, the Chinese Foreign Minister Wu Xueqian and Bhutanese Foreign Minister Dawa Tsering held talks on establishing bilateral relations in New York. In 1984, China and Bhutan began annual, direct talks over the border dispute.

In 1996, China offered to exchange Pasamlung and Jakarlung for Sinchulumpa, Dramana and Shakhatoe, a smaller tract of disputed area. This was accepted by Bhutan in principle. In 1998, China and Bhutan signed a bilateral agreement for maintaining peace on the border. In the agreement, China affirmed its respect for Bhutan's sovereignty and territorial integrity and both sides sought to build ties based on the Five Principles of Peaceful Co-existence. However, China's building of roads on what Bhutan asserts to be Bhutanese territory, allegedly in violation of the 1998 agreement, has provoked tensions. In 2002, China presented what it claimed to be evidence, asserting its ownership of disputed tracts of land; after negotiations, an interim agreement was reached.

On 11 August 2016 Bhutan Foreign Minister Damcho Dorji visited Beijing, capital of China, for the 24th round of boundary talks with Chinese Vice President Li Yuanchao. Both sides made comments to show their readiness to strengthen co-operations in various fields and hope of settling the boundary issues. In 2024, The New York Times reported that, according to satellite imagery, China had constructed villages inside of disputed territory within Bhutan. Chinese individuals, called "border guardians," received annual subsidies to relocate to newly built villages and paid to conduct border patrols. At least 22 Chinese villages and settlements have been constructed inside of disputed territory.

=== 2017 Doklam standoff ===
On June 29, 2017, Bhutan protested to China against the construction of a road in the disputed territory of Doklam, at the meeting point of Bhutan, India and China. On the same day, the Bhutanese border was put on high alert and border security was tightened as a result of the growing tensions. A stand-off between China and India has endured since mid June 2017 at the tri-junction adjacent to the Indian state of Sikkim after the Indian army blocked the Chinese construction of a road in what Bhutan and India consider Bhutanese territory. Both India and China deployed 3000 troops on June 30, 2017. On the same day, China released a map claiming that Doklam belonged to China. China claimed, via the map, that territory south to Gipmochi belonged to China and claimed that it was supported by the Convention of Calcutta. On July 3, 2017, China told India that former Indian prime minister Jawaharlal Nehru accepted the Convention of Calcutta. China claimed on July 5, 2017, it had a "basic consensus" with Bhutan and there was no dispute between the two countries. On August 10, 2017, Bhutan rejected Beijing's claim that Doklam belongs to China.

=== Sakteng Wildlife Sanctuary ===
On 2 June 2020, China raised a new dispute over territory that has never come up in boundary talks earlier. In the virtual meeting of the Global Environment Facility (GEF), China objected to a grant for the Sakteng Wildlife Sanctuary in eastern Bhutan's Trashigang District claiming that the area was disputed.

=== Three Step Roadmap MoU ===
On October 14, 2021, Bhutan and China signed a MoU for a three step roadmap to expedite boundary negotiation talks. Boundary negotiations between Bhutan and China had been initiated in 1984, but had seen little progress in the previous 5 years, initially due to the Doklam crisis and later due to the coronavirus pandemic. The talks would not cover the trijunction area between India, Bhutan and China. As per a 2012 understanding between India and China, the trijunction areas would only be resolved by consultation with all three involved parties.

== Historical maps ==
Historical maps of the border area from west to east in the International Map of the World and Operational Navigation Chart, mid-late 20th century:

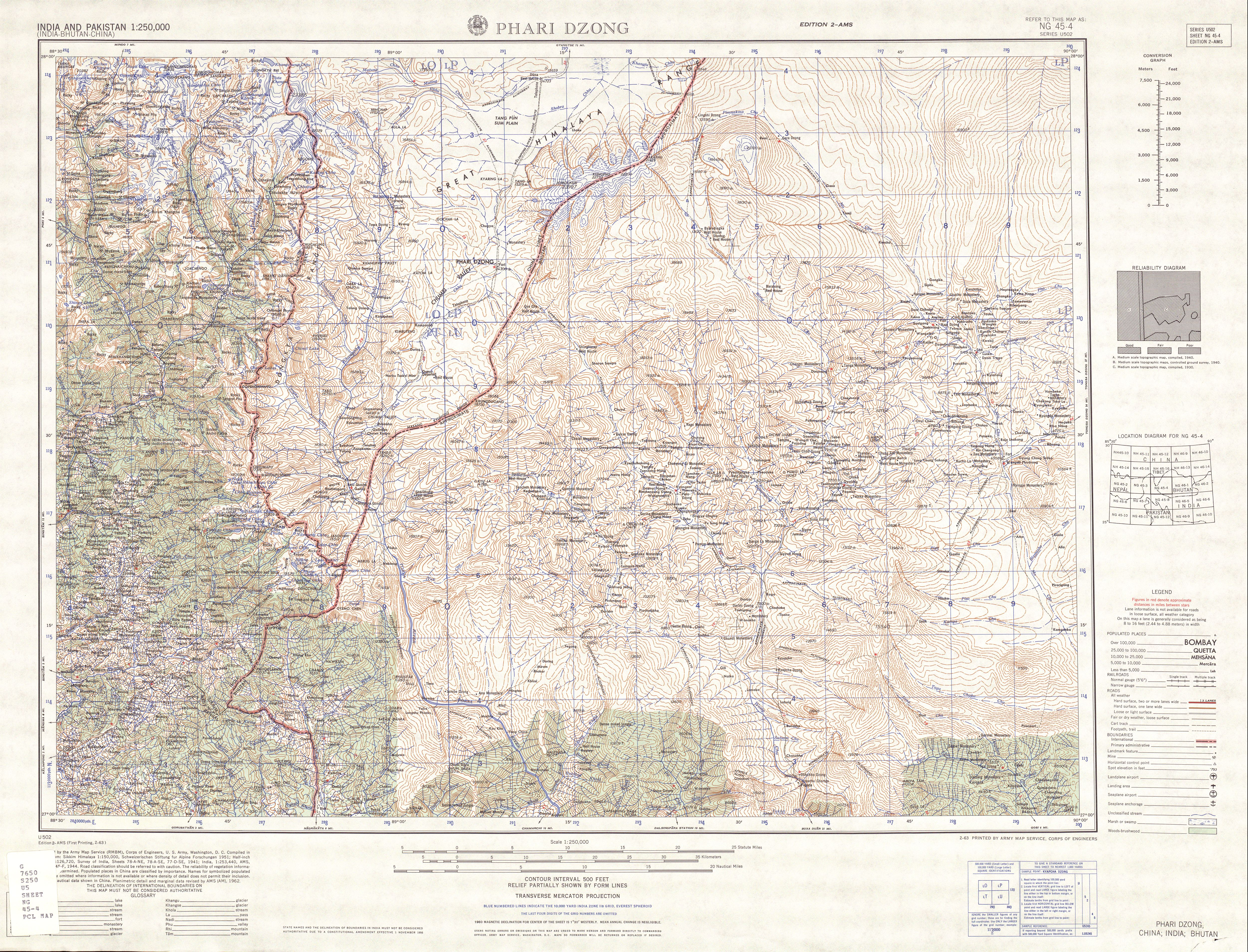

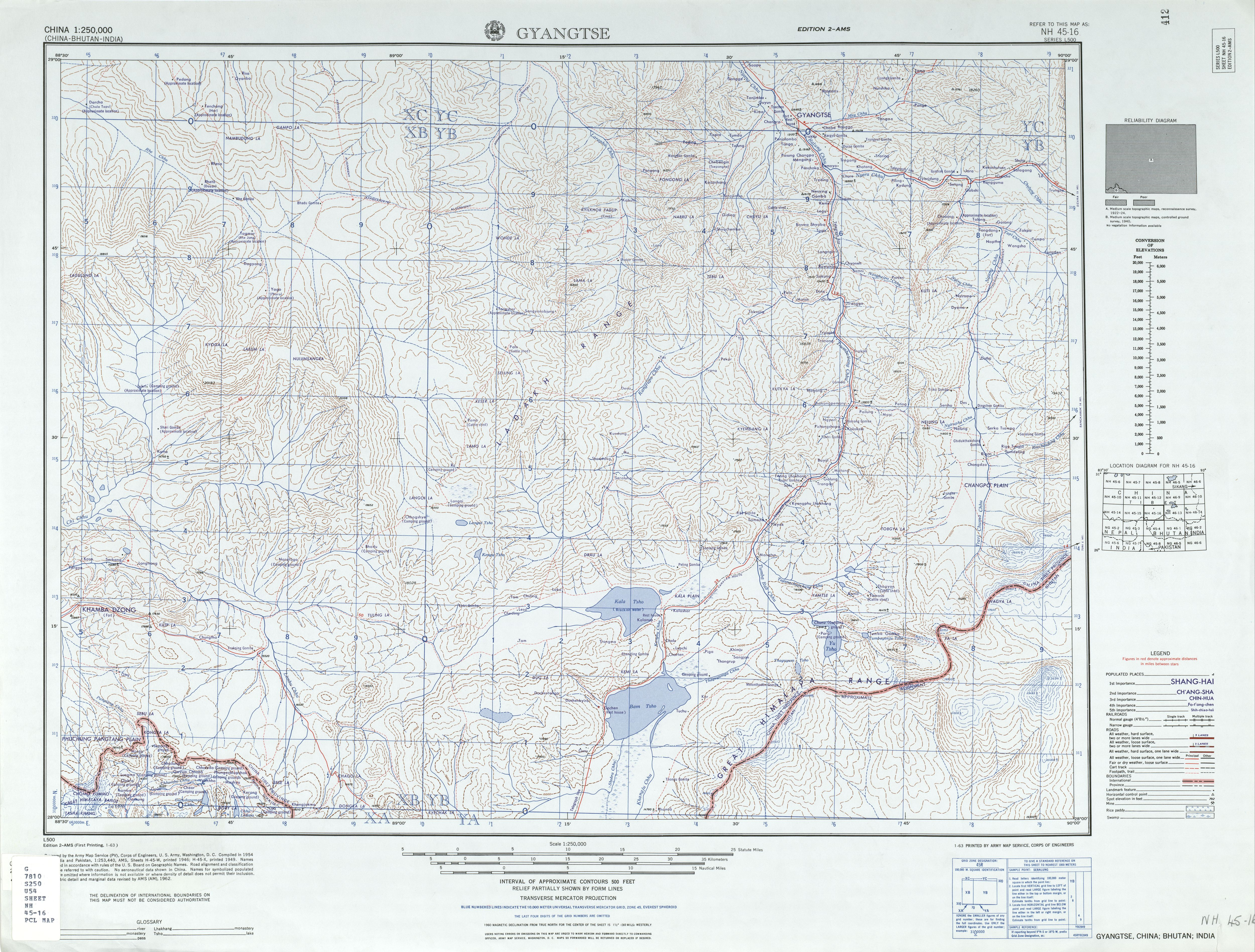

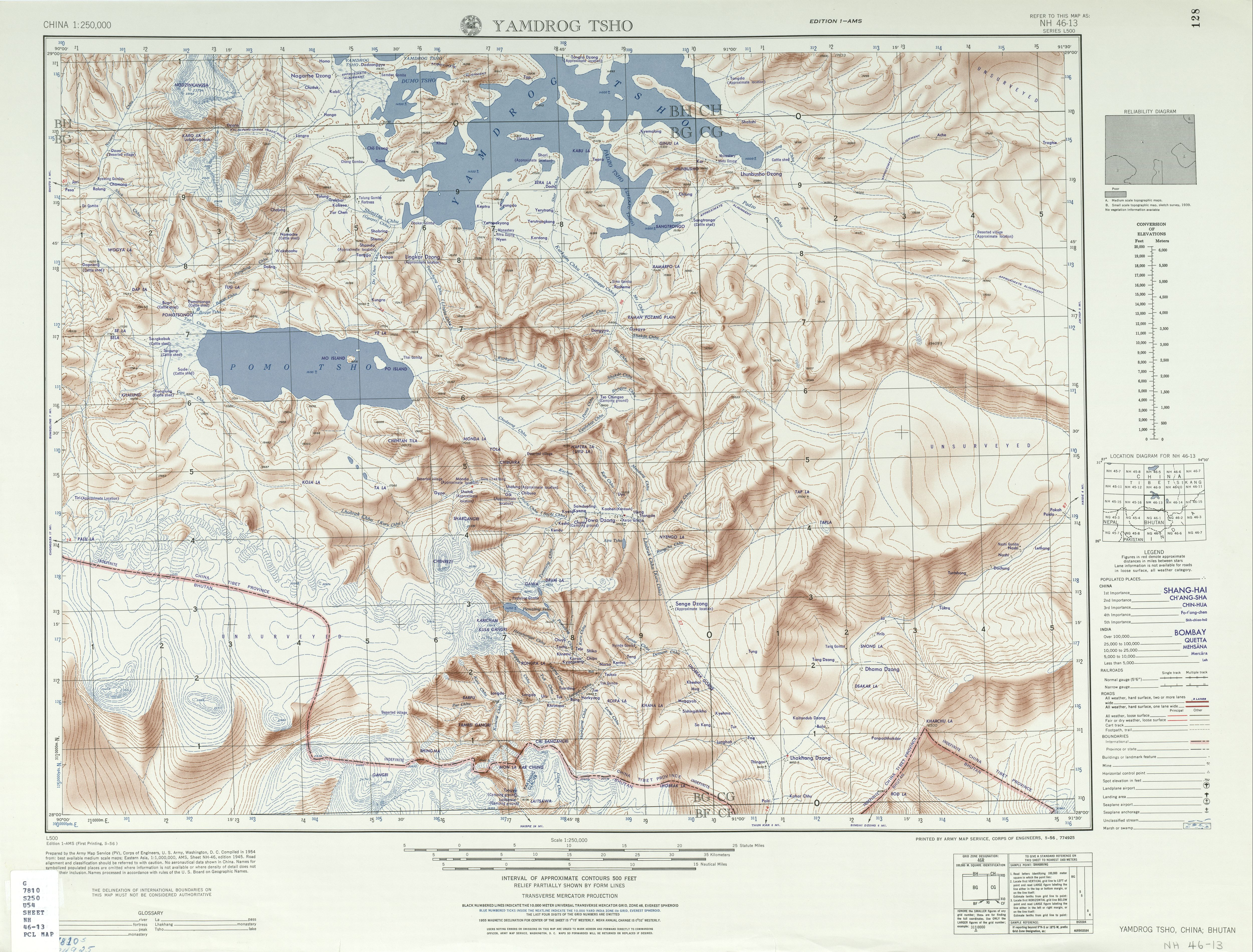

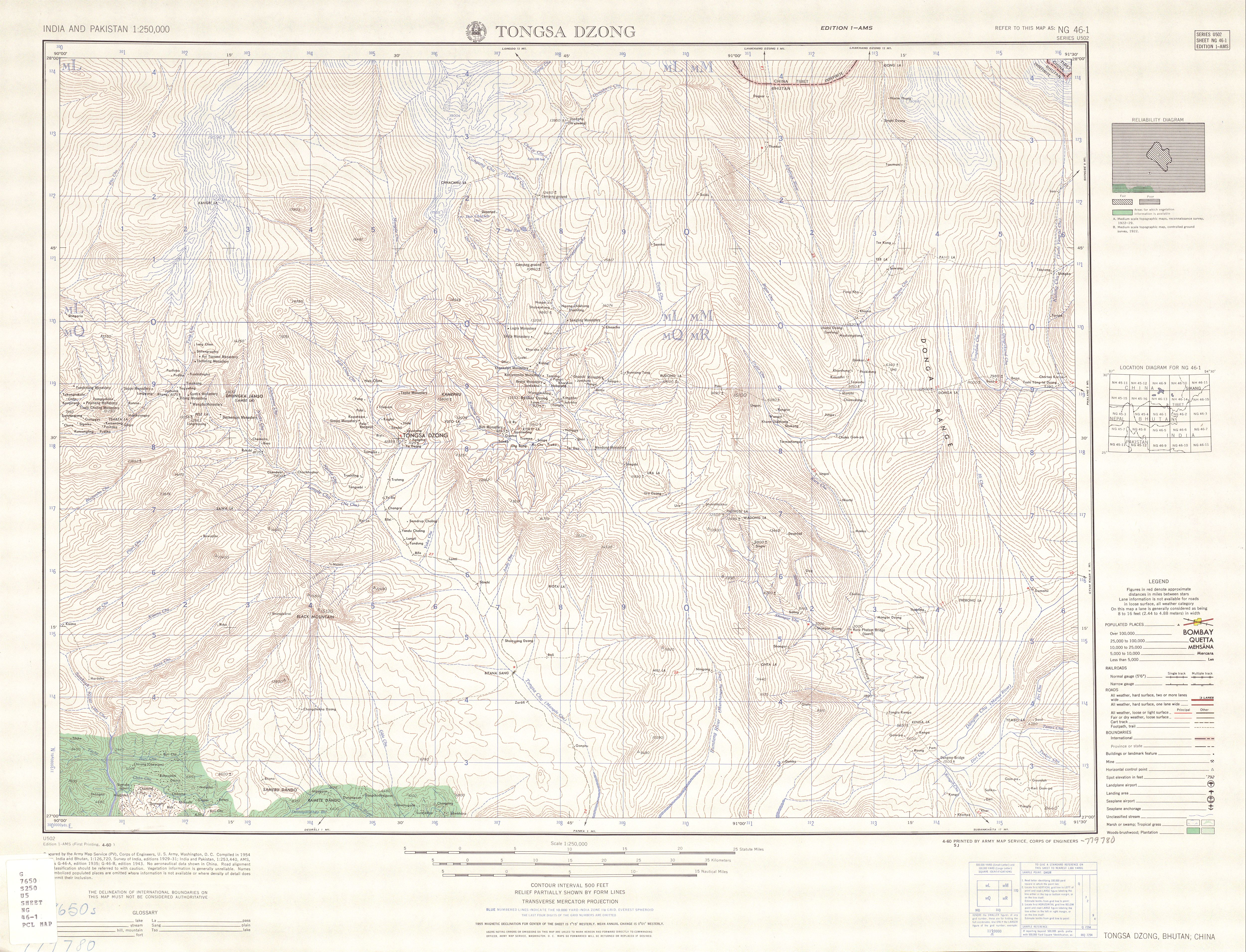

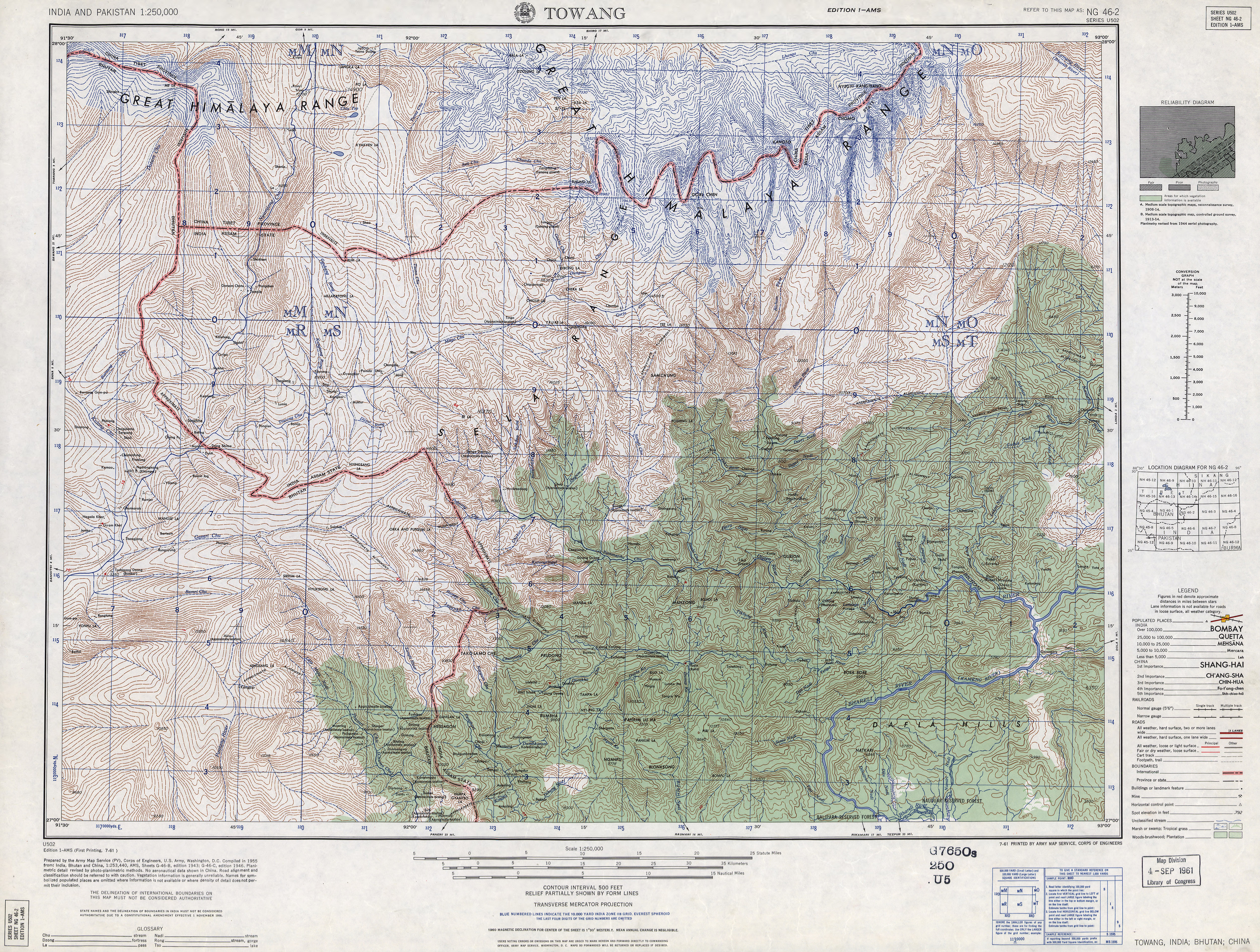

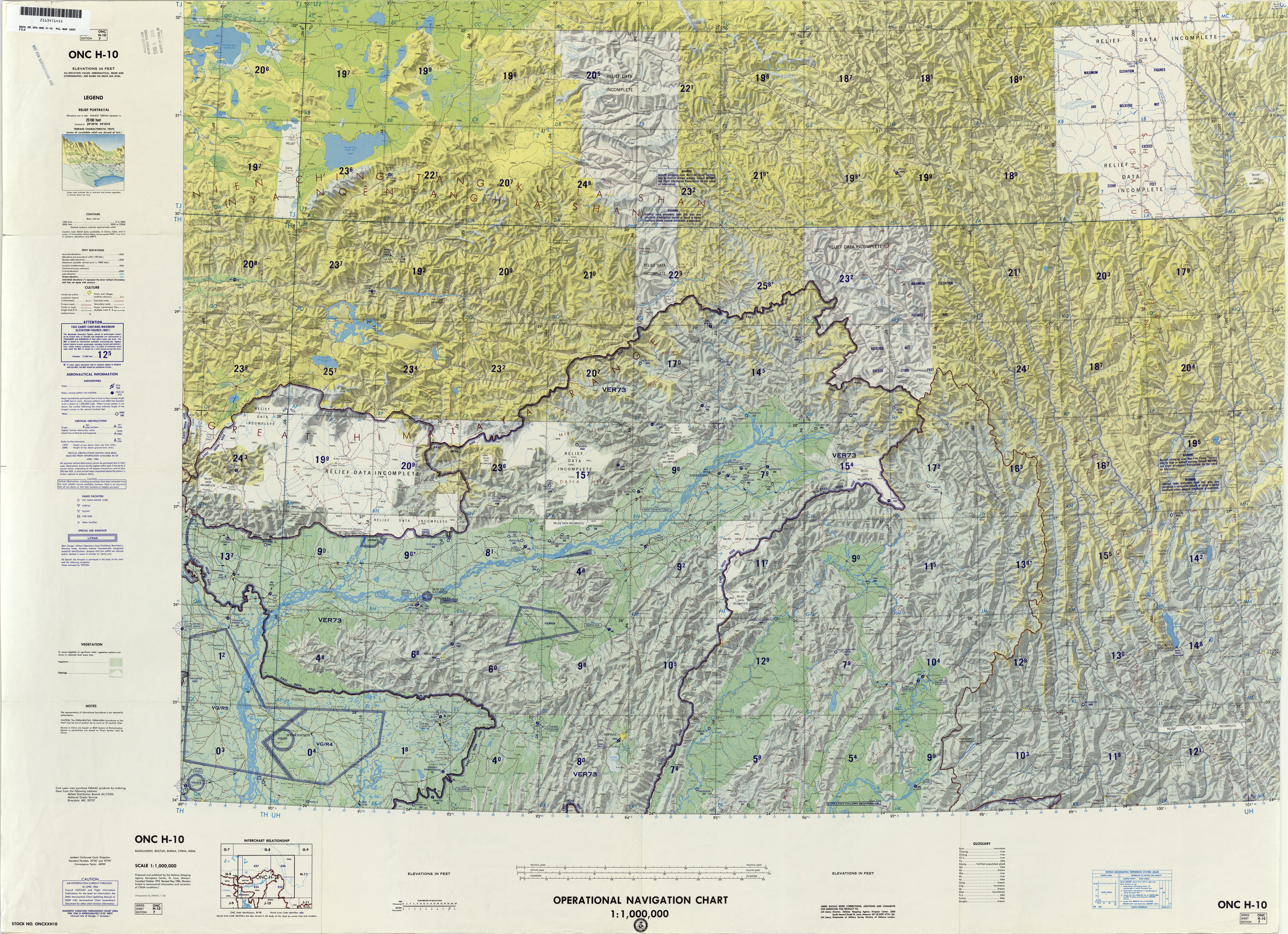

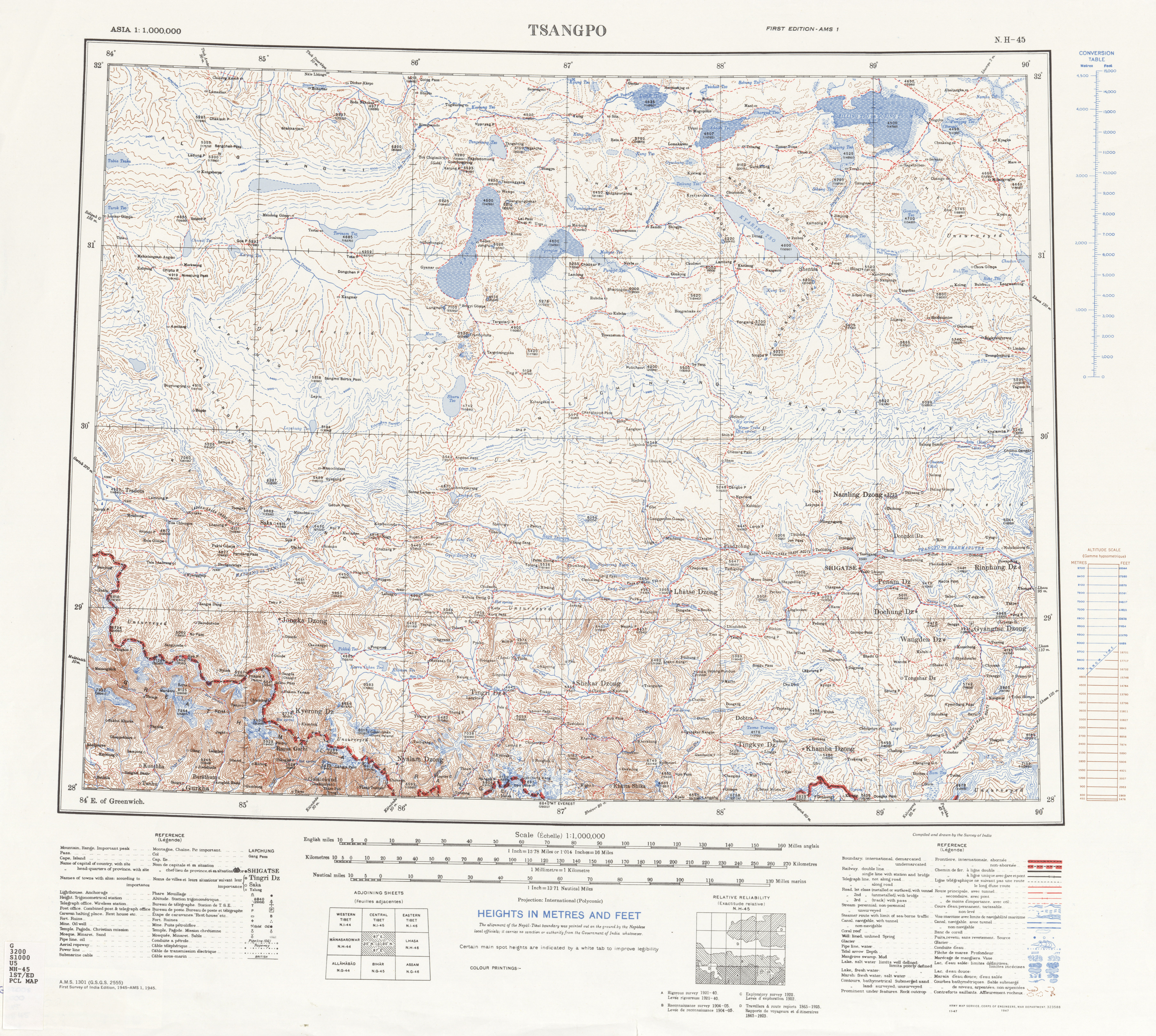

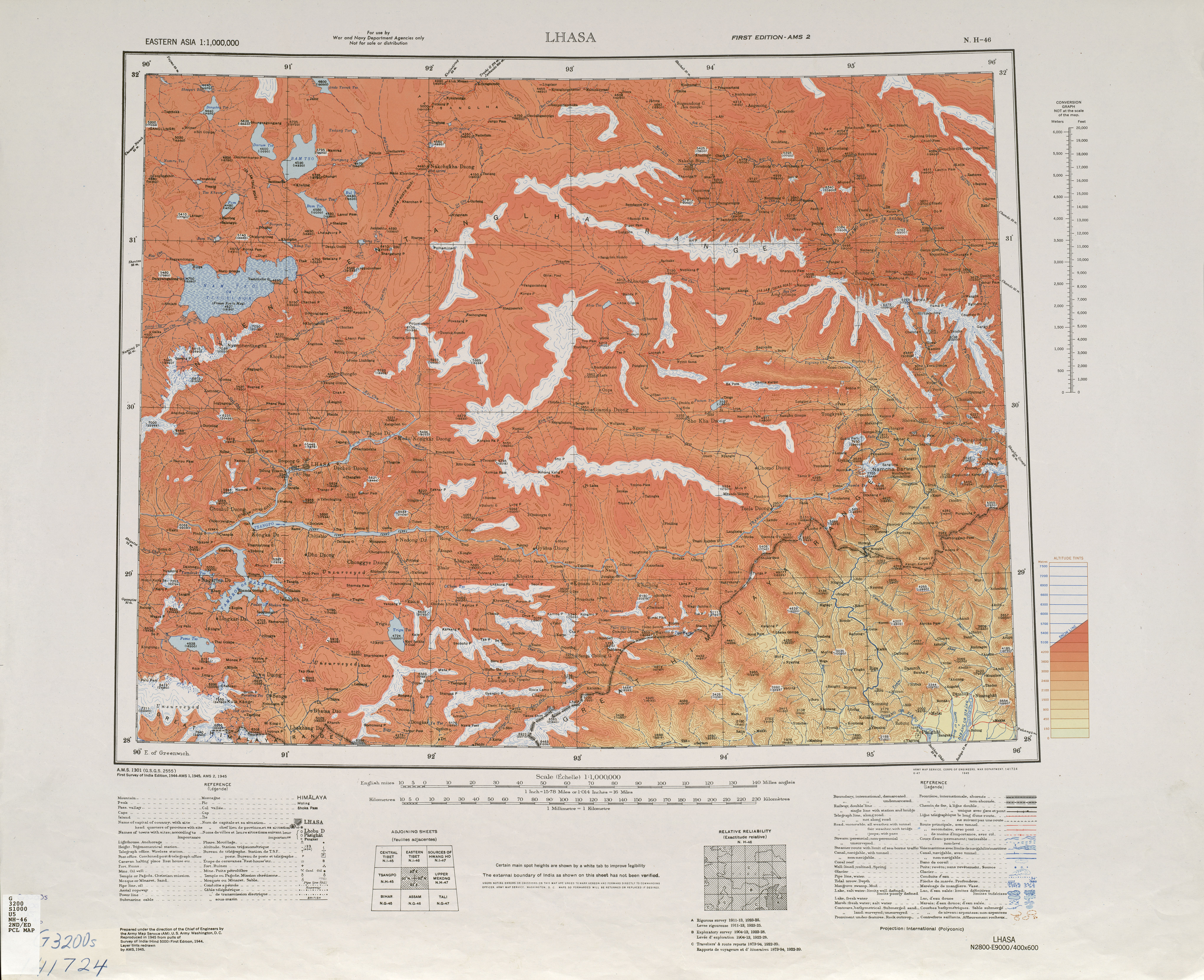

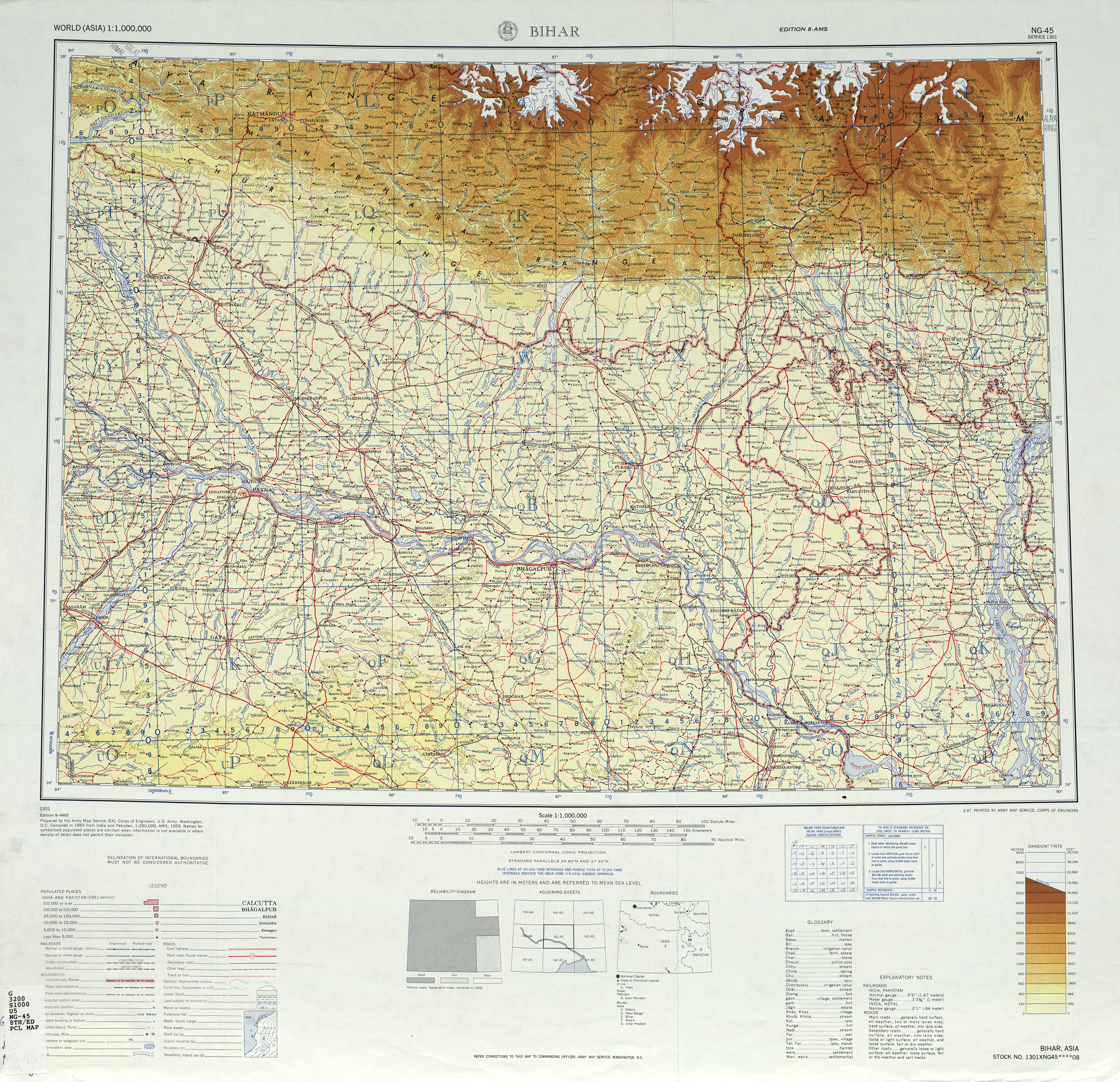

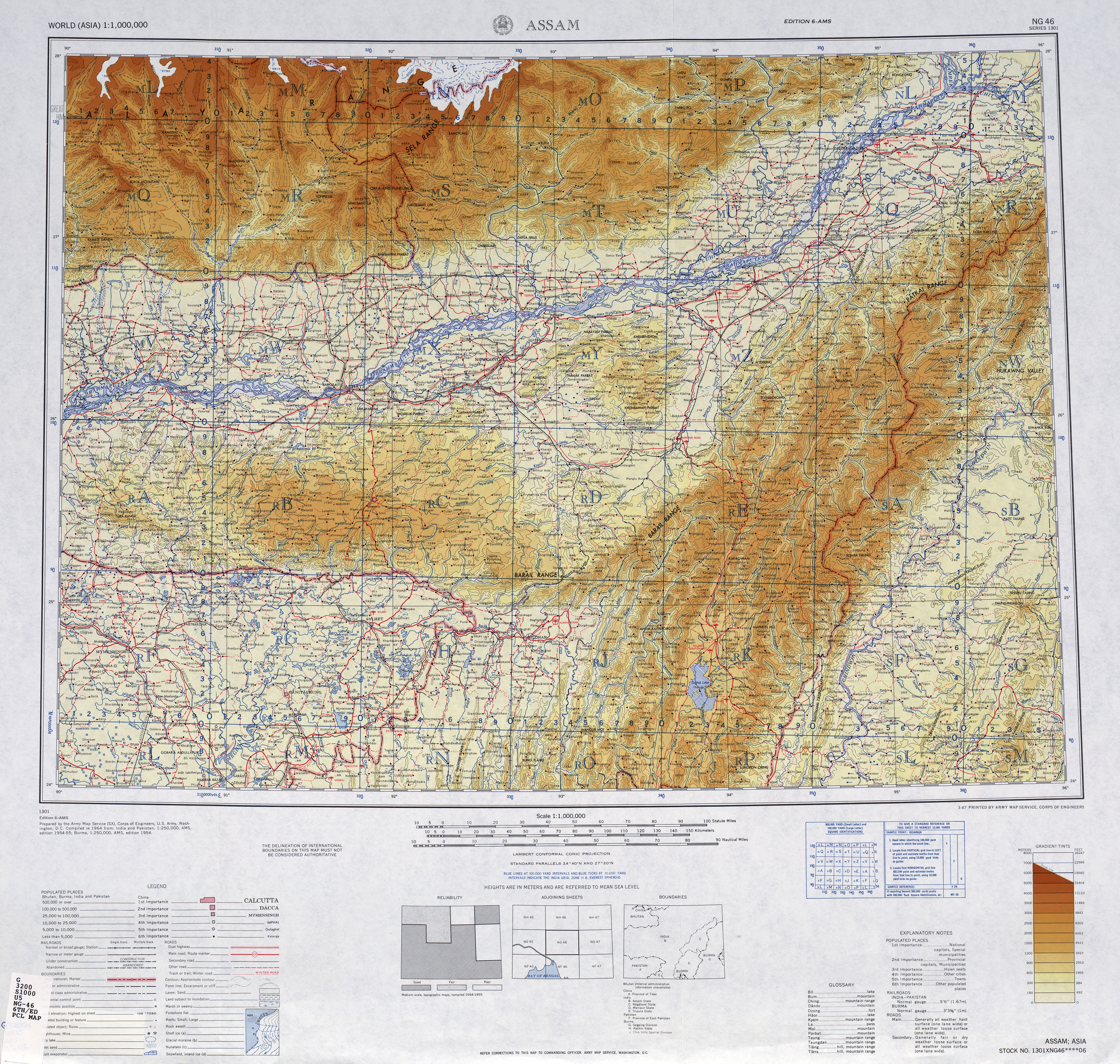
