= Sangbay =

- Location in Bhutan
- Coordinates: 27°10′N 89°5′E
- Country: Bhutan
- District: Haa District
- Time zone: UTC+6 (BTT)

Sangbay is a town in Sangbay Gewog, Haa District in southwestern Bhutan.
