= Pangda =

Chinese-administered village east of the India-Bhutan-China trijunction

Pangda 庞达
- Village
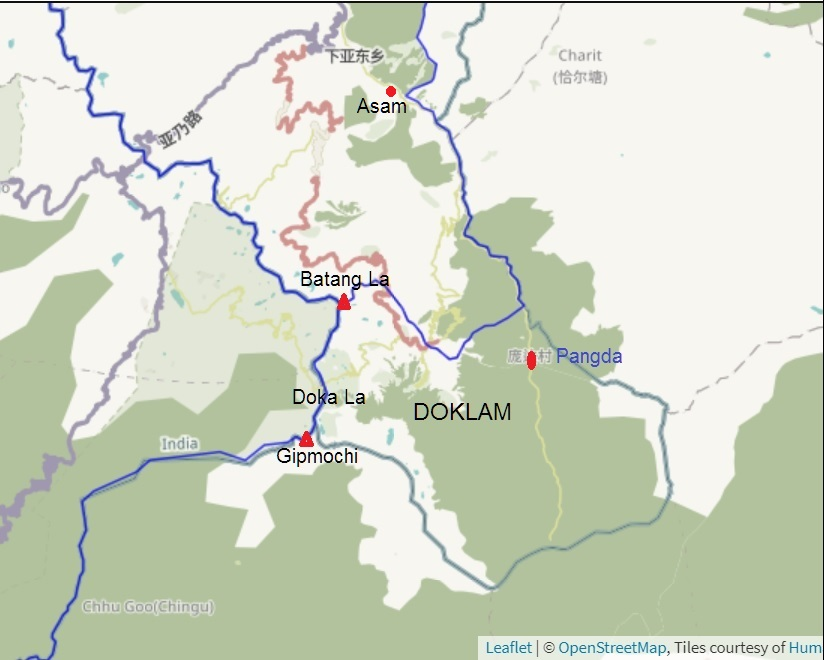
- Doklam area

- Location of Pangda in Bhutan
- Coordinates: 27°18′25.1994″N 89°0′28.7994″E
- Country: Unknown
- Established: October 2020
- Elevation: 2,140 m (7,020 ft)

Population
  - Estimate (2020): 124

Pangda village (庞达村) is a village constructed by China in the Doklam region near the India-Bhutan-China trijunction. It is approximately 10 km east of the trijunction in territory claimed by China but shown as part of Bhutan in some international maps. The village was constructed in 2020 on the bank of the Amo Chhu river (or Torsa River).

Media reports in November 2020 said that the village was constructed approximately 2 kilometres (1.2 mi) within Bhutanese territory based on third-party satellite images. This was later denied by Bhutan and China.

== History ==
=== Background ===
China has had ongoing claims to the Doklam region at the border between its Yadong County and Bhutan's Haa District near the trijunction with India. The region is the basin of a small stream called Doklam stream (also called Torsa Nala), which originates on the Doklam plateau and joins the Amo Chhu river 15 km downstream.

In 2017, Indian and Chinese forces skirmished on the Doklam plateau after China attempted to extend a road across the Doklam stream towards the Zhompelri ridge that overlooks the Indian plains. After several injuries on both sides, India and China withdrew their forces to previously held positions, effectively ending the standoff. Despite the disengagement, satellite imagery showed that China continued to develop the area and reinforce the disputed region.

=== Village construction ===
Satellite images on 28 October 2020 showed a new village being constructed on the banks of Amo Chhu. Chinese state media claimed that residents moved into the new village in September 2020 from Shangdui village in Yadong county.

In November 2020, media reports said that the village was constructed approximately 2 kilometres (1.2 mi) within Bhutanese territory based on third-party open source maps. The reports were denied by the Chinese Ministry of Foreign Affairs, The Bhutanese, and the Bhutanese ambassador to India, who said that "there is no Chinese village inside Bhutan." Following the denial of Pangda's encroachment of the Bhutanese border, Chinese media portrayed the accusations as an attempt by India to sow discord between Bhutan and China and drive a wedge between the two nations.

Further construction took place in 2021. This primarily consisted of a cluster of 38 new buildings north of the primary settlement and was completed in November. The village was classified as xiaokang, or moderately well-off, according to official Chinese statements.

== Geography ==
Pangda village was constructed directly on the banks of the Torsa River, 10 km south of any other Chinese settlement in the region. It appears to have been constructed on a sandbank. There is one road that leads out of the village, and a small retaining wall was constructed to keep floodwaters out of the village.

== Demographics ==
According to Chinese state media in 2020, there were 27 households in the village with 124 people. There are two administrative buildings in the village, and the villagers are reported to be primarily employed in tourism, fishing, and border patrol.
