= Ma Muming =

Chinese ambassador

Chargé d'affaires of China to India
- In office 1972–1976
- Preceded by: Liu Fangpu
- Succeeded by: Chen Zhaoyuan

Ambassador of China to Spain
- In office September 20, 1976 – June 30, 1980
- Preceded by: Chen Zhaoyuan
- Succeeded by: Zhang Shijie

Ambassador of China to Nepal
- In office May 1981 – October 1984
- Preceded by: es:Peng Guangwei
- Succeeded by: Tu Guowei

Personal details
- Born: 1930 (age 95–96)

Ma Muming (Chinese: 马牧鸣; pinyin: Mǎ Mùmíng, born 1930) is a retired Ambassador of the People's Republic of China.

- From 1972 to 1976 he was Chargé d'affaires of the embassy of the People's Republic of China in New Delhi.
- On June 2, 1974 he represented the government of the People's Republic of China at the coronation of Jigme Singye Wangchuck and was until today the only representative of the government of China to the government of Bhutan.
- From September 20, 1976 to June 30, 1980 he was ambassador in Madrid.
- From 1981 to 1984 he was ambassador to Kathmandu.
