= Chen Zhaoyuan =

Chinese civil engineer (1930–2020)

- Born: 1 October 1930; Ningbo, Zhejiang, China
- Died: 25 June 2020 (aged 89); Beijing, China
- Education: Tsinghua University
- Scientific career
- Fields: Civil and Structural Engineering
- Workplaces: Tsinghua University

Chinese name
- Traditional Chinese: 陳肇元
- Simplified Chinese: 陈肇元
Transcriptions
Standard Mandarin
- Hanyu Pinyin: Chén Zhàoyuán

Chen Zhaoyuan (Chinese: 陈肇元; 1 October 1930 – 25 June 2020) was a Chinese engineer specializing in civil structural engineering and protection engineering. He was a member of the Chinese Civil Engineering Society (CCES).

== Biography ==
Chen was born in Ningbo, Zhejiang, on 1 October 1930. In 1949 he was accepted by Shanghai Institute of Textile Technology (now Donghua University), where he majored in textile. He was admitted by Tsinghua University in 1950 and taught there when he graduated. He joined the Chinese Communist Party in March 1953. In August 1957, he obtained a master's degree in civil engineering from Harbin Institute of Technology. He was a visiting scholar at the University of Illinois at Urbana–Champaign between April 1983 and April 1984. He was appointed director of the Department of Architecture in September 1984, serving until September 1988. He died of illness in Beijing, on 25 June 2020.

== Autobiography ==
- 陈肇元自传 我的土木工程科研生涯 [Autobiography of Chen Zhaoyuan: My Career in Civil Engineering Research] (in Chinese). Beijing: Science Press. 2016. ISBN 9787030495181.

== Honors and awards ==
- 1997 Member of the Chinese Academy of Engineering (CAE)
