= Sangbay Gewog =

Sangbay Gewog གསང་སྦས་
- Gewogs
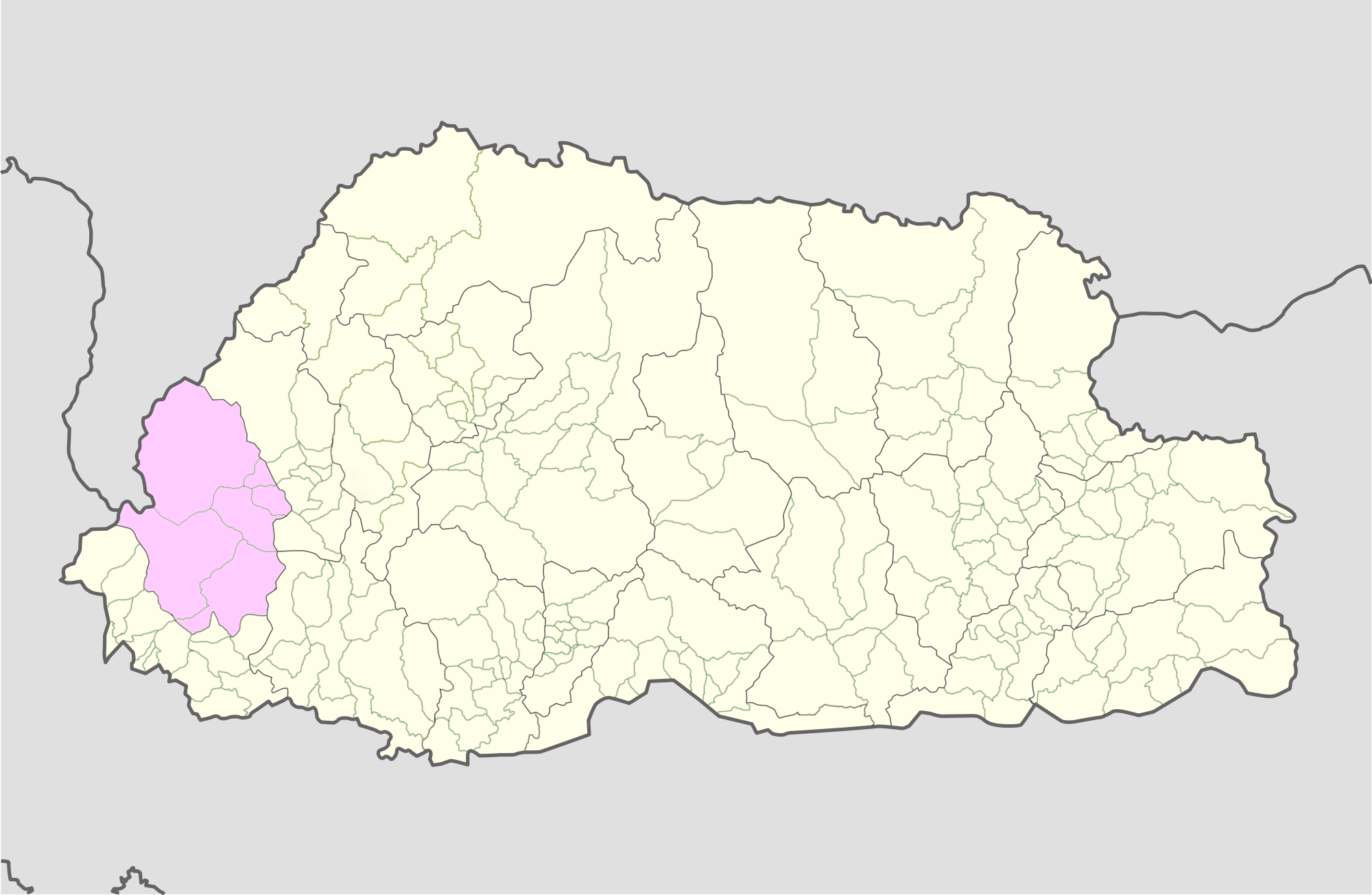
- Sangbay Gewog in Bhutan's Haa District
- Coordinates: 27°10′08″N 89°06′19″E
- Country: Bhutan
- District: Haa District

Area (Note: 97 percent of the area is covered by forest.)
  - Total: 432.8 km^{2} (167.1 sq mi)

Population (2017)
  - Total: 911
  - Density: 2.10/km^{2} (5.45/sq mi)
- Time zone: UTC+6 (BTT)

Sangbay or Sangbaykha (Note: Alternative spellings: Sangbe, Sangbekha, Tsangbe, Sombe, Sombay and Sombaykha.) (Dzongkha: གསང་སྦས, romanized: gsang sbas) Gewog is a gewog (village block) of Haa District, Bhutan. It is one of the western gewogs of the Haa district sharing borders with the Samtse District, India's Sikkim state and China's Chumbi Valley (Yadong County). The latter border has been contested by China, which claims the Doklam region as its territory. In recent years, China has begun to build villages in its claimed area.

== Geography ==
Sangbay Gewog (Note: The borders shown are those marked by the contributors to the OpenStreetMap and may not be accurate. For the borders marked by the US Office of the Geographer, see Bhutan Political Boundaries, 2008 and Second-level Administrative Divisions, Bhutan, 2015, EarthWorks, Stanford University, retrieved 6 August 2022.)

In 2013, the Eleventh Plan document reported that the gewog had an area of 432.8 square kilometres, with 97 per cent of it covered by forest. (Note: The land area remained unchanged from the Ninth Plan document in 2002.)

The gewog mainly consists of the basin of the Amo Chu river after it enters the gewog near Sinchela. (Above this point, only the left bank of the river is included in Bhutan; the right bank belongs to China's Chumbi Valley.) The upper part of the river valley in the gewog is said to be narrow with steep ridges. It has no population centres. Most of the villages are near Sangbay, the site of a historic dzong (now in ruins). The Tule La pass (27.1497°N 88.9854°E) on the Zompelri ridge provided communication with the modern Samtse District and the Dalingkot region further west. (Note: The territory up to the Dichu river appears to have been under the Sangbay Dzong in pre-modern times, with a deputy Dzongpön stationed at Dzongsa and Sipsu.) (The Dalingkot tract was ceded to British India after the Anglo-Bhutan War of 1865, and is now India's Kalimpong district.)

The Zompelri ridge continues to the north in a semi-circular formation, with the Mount Gipmochi (4,427 m) at its apex. Beyond Gipmochi is India's Sikkim state. To the north of the Zompelri ridge and connecting with the Dongkya Range is the Doklam plateau, which gives rise to a tributary of the Amo Chu called Torsa Nala or Doklam River. The basin of the Doklam river, termed the "Doklam region", is claimed by China as its territory.

== Demographics ==
The population of the gewog by the 2017 census was 911. The Election Commission listed 16 villages in the gewog 2011. The number of households is 183.

== See also ==
- Sangbay
