= Dawa Tsering =

Bhutanese politician

Dawa Tsering served as Minister of Foreign Affairs of Bhutan in the 1980s and 1990s, carrying out negotiations to improve Sino-Bhutanese relations. He also worked to strengthen the close relations with the Government of India.

== Life and career ==
Tsering was born in 1935. He obtained a Bachelor of Arts (Honours in Economics and Political Science) in 1956 and Bachelor of Law in 1959 from the University of Calcutta. In his career spanning over three and a half decades he served as the education director (1960), secretary general for planning and development wing (1965), and the first minister for the same wing in 1969. In 1972, he became Minister of Foreign Affairs and served the country in that capacity until 1998.

The Druk Thuksel award, 1966, and the Coronation Gold medal, 1974, are two from among several awards he had received (Kuensel, 2007).
