= Sakteng Wildlife Sanctuary =

Wildlife and yeti sanctuary in Bhutan

Coordinates: 27.28°N 91.95°E

Sakteng
- IUCN category IV (habitat/species management area)
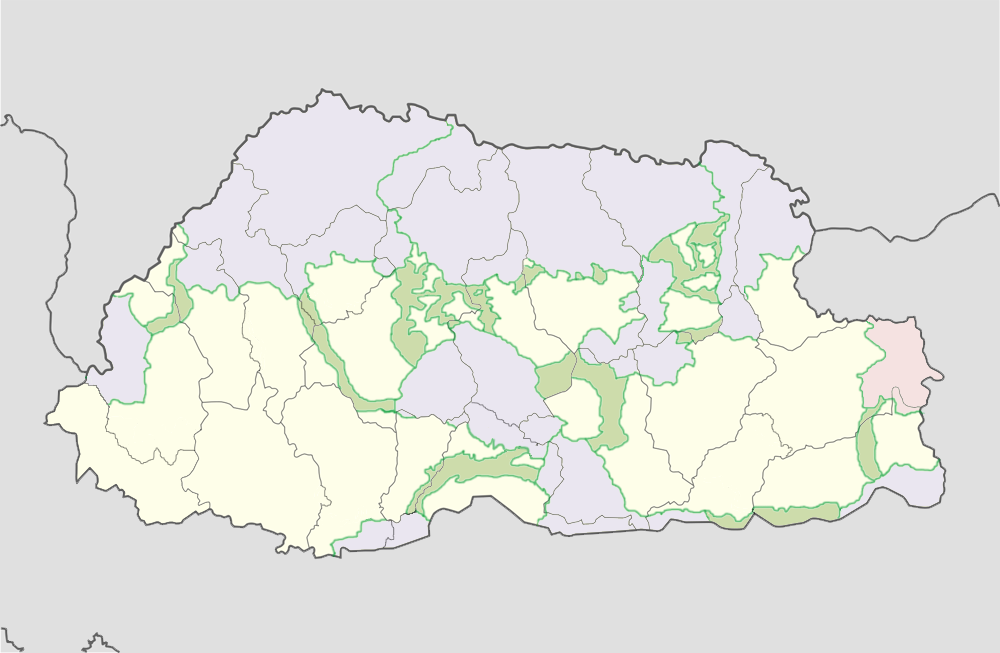
- Location of Sakteng Wildlife Sanctuary (pale orange)
- Location: Trashigang, Samdrup Jongkhar, Bhutan
- Area: 742.46 km^{2} (286.67 sq mi)
- Max. elevation: 4500m
- Min. elevation: 1500m
- Established: 17th April, 2003

Sakteng Wildlife Sanctuary is a wildlife sanctuary in Bhutan, located in Merak and Sakteng Gewogs of Trashigang District and just crossing the border into Samdrup Jongkhar District. It is one of the country's protected areas and is listed as a tentative site in Bhutan's Tentative List for UNESCO inclusion.

The sanctuary has three ranges: Merak Range, Sakteng Range, and Joenkhar Range. Sakteng Range is the largest range with an area of 333.67 km^{2}, followed by Merak Range (287.352 km^{2}) and Joenkhar Range (121.442 km^{2}).

== Flora and fauna ==
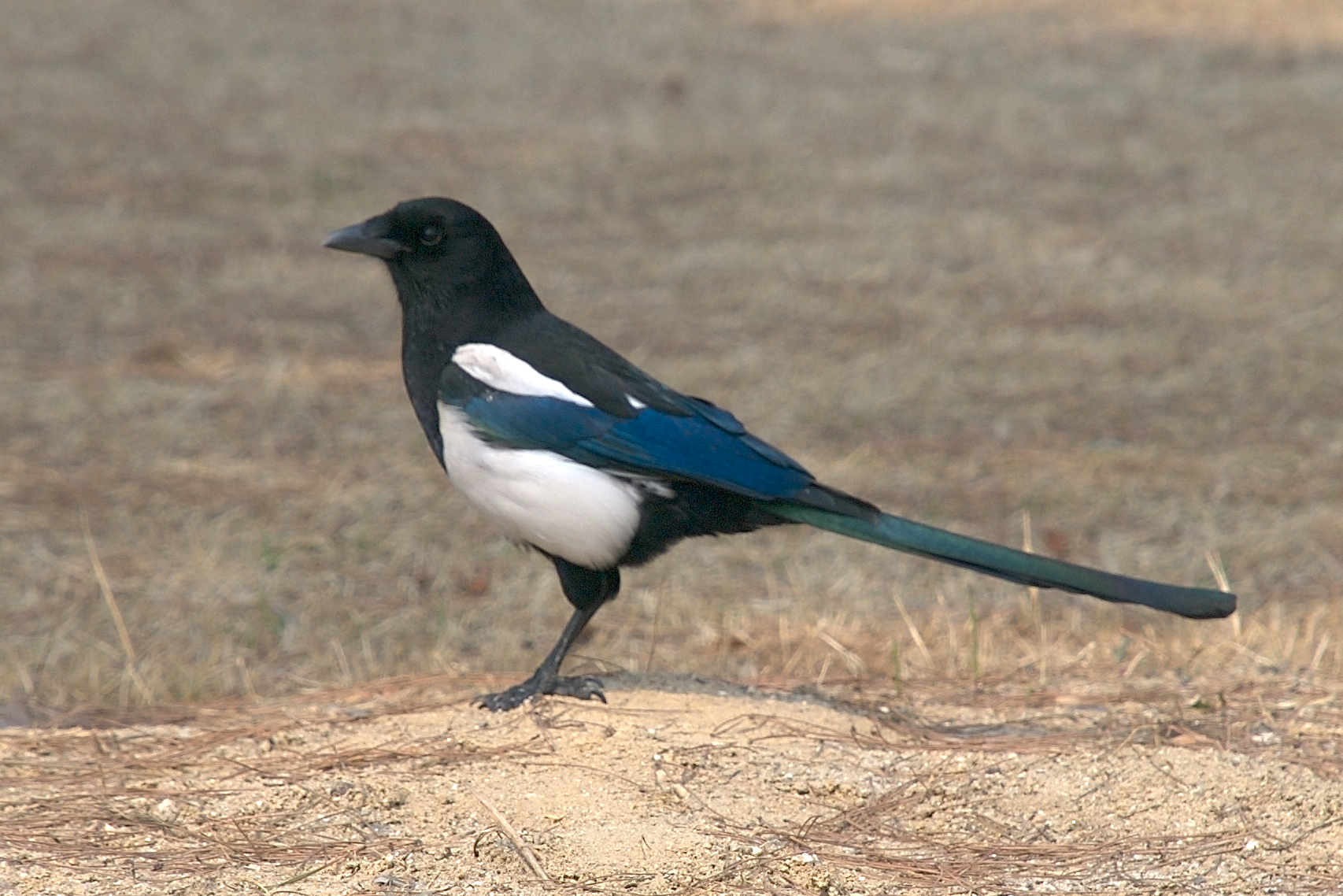
Black-rumped magpie

The sanctuary represents the easternmost temperate ecosystems and landscapes of Bhutan, and is part of the Eastern Himalayan subalpine conifer forests ecoregion. It protects several endemic species including the eastern blue pine, Meconopsis merakensis var. merakensis, the black-rumped magpie, and the endangered Himalayan red panda, A. f. fulgens.

Sakteng Wildlife Sanctuary was created in part to protect the migoi, a yeti-like cryptid whose existence has not been scientifically confirmed, but in which the local population strongly believes. The migoi are believed to haunt the northern part of the area.

== Territorial dispute ==
According to Tenzing Lamsang, editor of The Bhutanese, in all official Chinese maps, the sanctuary is shown to be Bhutanese territory. The area including Sakteng Wildlife Sanctuary made news in June 2020 when the Chinese government reaffirmed that it is a territory disputed between China and Bhutan. Bhutan rejected the assertion, and denied that China had ever laid claim to the area in the past.

In July 2020, the Indian Border Roads Organisation was tasked with building new strategic roads to connect eastern Bhutan to western Tawang area such as Lumla-Trashigang road through Sakteng Wildlife Sanctuary.

== See also ==
- List of protected areas of Bhutan
