= Five Fingers of Tibet =

Chinese foreign policy

- Chinese: 西藏的五指
Transcriptions
Standard Mandarin
- Hanyu Pinyin: Xīzàng de wǔ zhǐ

The Five Fingers of Tibet (Chinese: 西藏的五指; pinyin: Xīzàng de wǔzhǐ) is the incorrect interpretation of Chinese territorial claim to the Himalayan region bordering India, misattributed to Mao Zedong.

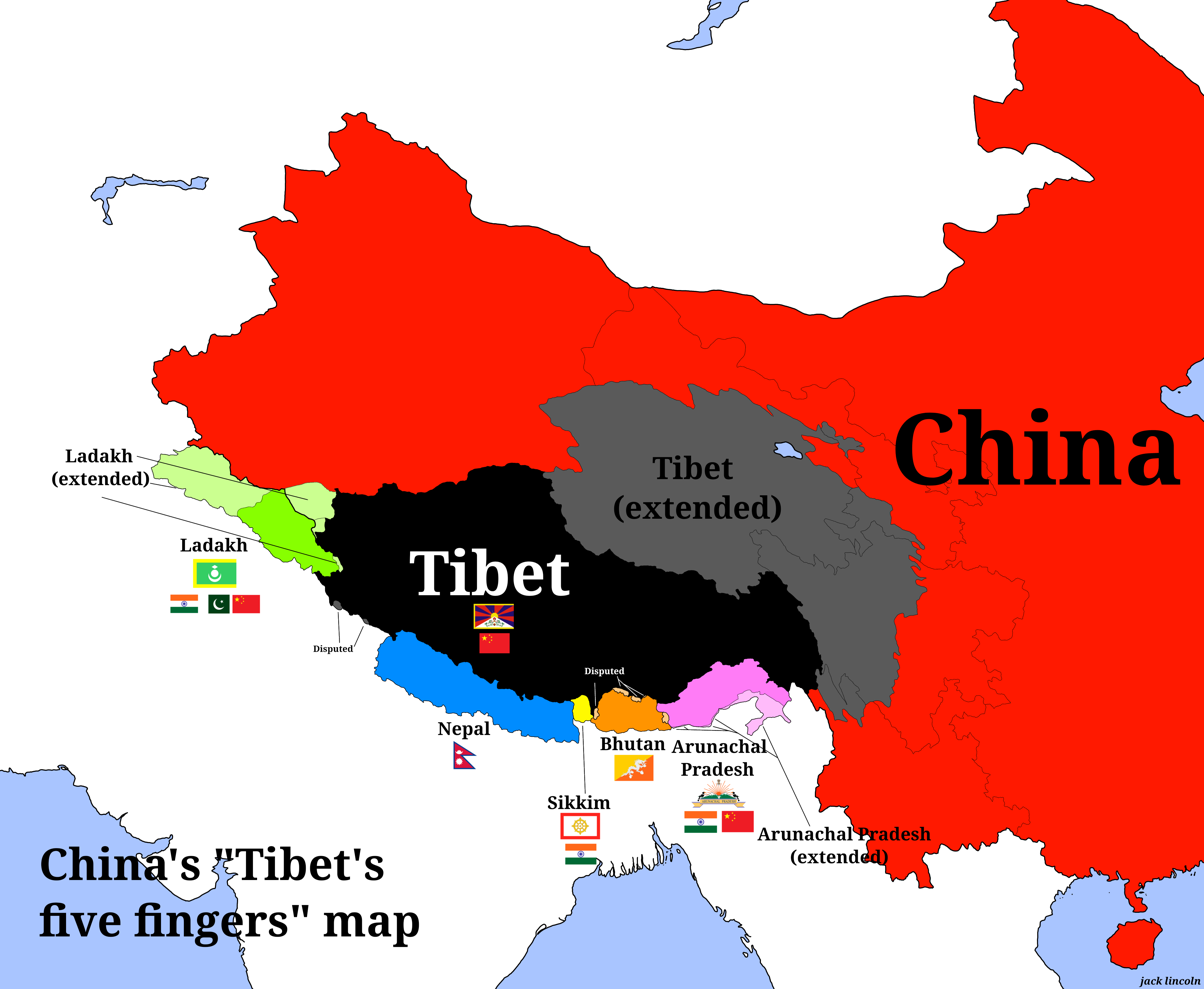
China's "Tibet's five fingers" map

It considers Tibet to be China's right hand palm, with five fingers on its periphery: Ladakh, Nepal, Sikkim, Bhutan, and North-East Frontier Agency (now known as Arunachal Pradesh) that are considered China's responsibility to "liberate". It has never been official Chinese policy. It is now been interpreted to be dormant, but concerns have often been raised over its possible continued existence or revival.

== Background ==
Singh states that the claim that "Mao articulated [the Five Fingers policy] remains heresay". Imperial China claimed suzerainty over Nepal, Sikkim, and Bhutan as an extension of its claim over Tibet. These claims were asserted by the Chinese amban in Tibet in 1908, who wrote to the Nepalese authorities that Nepal and Tibet, "being united like brothers under the auspices of China, should work in harmony for mutual good." He suggested the "blending of five colours" representing China, Tibet, Nepal, Sikkim, and Bhutan as part of his program to assert the Chinese claim in the face of British opposition. On 15 November 1939, the founding chairman of the Chinese Communist Party (CCP), Mao Zedong termed Bhutan and Nepal as China's tributary states.

After having inflicted military defeats on China, the imperialist countries forcibly took from her a large number of states tributary to China, as well as a part of her own territory. Japan appropriated Korea, Taiwan, the Ryukyu Islands, the Pescadores, and Port Arthur; England took Burma, Bhutan, Nepal, and Hongkong; France seized Annam; even a miserable little country like Portugal took Macao from us. At the same time that they took away part of her territory, the imperialists obliged China to pay enormous indemnities. Thus heavy blows were struck against the vast feudal empire of China. (Note: The official version—in Mao's Selected Works, Vol III—omits mentions of Korea, Burma, Bhutan, Nepal, and Annam.)

— Mao Zedong

== Emergence in the 20th century ==
The "Five Fingers of Tibet" policy has been widely attributed to Mao's speeches in the 1940s, but has never been discussed in official Chinese public statements. This construct considered Tibet to be the palm of China's right hand, with Ladakh, Nepal, Sikkim, Bhutan, and North-East Frontier Agency (now known as Arunachal Pradesh) being its five fingers. In 1954, Chinese officers in Tibet claimed that they would "liberate Sikkim, Bhutan, Ladakh, and the NEFA, which were wrongfully being held by the Indian imperialists."

In 1954, the Chinese government published a book called "A Brief History of Modern China" for school students, which included a map showing the territories allegedly taken by "imperialist powers" between 1840 and 1919, terming them as "portions of China that must be reclaimed." This map included Ladakh, Nepal, Bhutan, Sikkim, and the entire Northeast India. This was noted in the memoirs of Indian diplomat Triloki Nath Kaul who was serving in Peking (now known as Beijing) at that time. Scholar B. S. K. Grover said that this map was a "serious reflection of Peking's ambitions" and not mere propaganda or "idle-boasting".

The claims over the "five fingers" were asserted "emphatically and frequently" from 1958 to 1961 over the Peking and Lhasa radio systems. (Note: The author does not cite any source.) During a mass meeting in Lhasa in July 1959, Chinese lieutenant general Zhang Guohua said: "Bhutanese, Sikkimese and Ladakhis form a united family in Tibet. They have always been subject to Tibet and to the great motherland of China. They must once again be united and taught the communist doctrine." (Note: The statement attributed to Zhang Guohua (Old spelling: Chang Kuow-Hua or Chang Kuo-Hua), the head of the Chinese Mission in Tibet, made in a public meeting in Lhasa on 17 July 1959. This passage was apparently deleted from the version reported in China Today, but it was reported by George N. Patterson, the Kalimpong correspondent of The Daily Telegraph and also published in the Hindustan Times.) Alarmed, Bhutan closed off its border with China and shut off all trade and diplomatic contacts. It also established formal defence arrangements with India.

== Relevance to 21st century policy ==
The policy is officially dormant now. However, fears have been expressed regarding its revival.

After the 2017 China–India border standoff at Doklam, an article in Qunzhong (a magazine run by the CCP's Jiangsu provincial party standing committee) quoted Mao Zedong's "five fingers" construct. The article was contributed by a researcher from Nanjing University. It alleges that India's covert support to the Tibetan independence movement stems from the fact that it was impossible to fully control the "five fingers" without the "palm", Tibet. It adds that as China's investments, trade, and economic relations with these regions increase, Chinese influence will overtake that of India and neutralize Indian control to a greater extent.

Lobsang Sangay, the leader of the Central Tibetan Administration, linked the policy with the border disputes between China and India. Adhir Ranjan Chowdhury, Seshadri Chari, and M. M. Khajooria (former Director General of Police of Jammu and Kashmir) have voiced similar concerns.

According to commentator Saurav Jha, the "five fingers" policy arises from the historical geography of the Himalayas which allows bi-directional territorial claims between Tibet and the southern regions. This leads to tensions between the trans-Himalayan powers which is "ultimately tempered by a balance of military capability," and is the reason behind the longstanding Sino-Indian border dispute.

== See also ==
- Chinese expansionism
- Chinese salami slicing strategy
