= The Bhutanese =

Newspaper in Bhutan

- Editor: Tenzing Lamsang
- Founded: 21 February 2012; 14 years ago
- Language: English and Dzongkha
- Headquarters: Thimphu, Bhutan
- Website: thebhutanese.bt

The Bhutanese is a newspaper based in Bhutan. It was founded by the investigative journalist Tenzing Lamsang in February 2012. Originally it was published bi-weekly on Wednesdays and Saturdays but, since August 2013, only weekly on Saturdays to focus on a weekly format. The paper is written mainly in English with a Dzongkha language section.

== Sources ==
- The Bhutanese
