= Dongkya Range =

Mountain range in the Himalayas

Coordinates: 27°41′N 88°50′E

Dongkya or Dongkhya range (Note: Alternative spellings include Dongkiya.) is a mountain range in the Himalayas that forms the eastern border of Sikkim, a state of India. Its northern tip extends to Dongkha La. As it moves southwards, sometimes referred to as the Chola range, it is cut by Cho La, Yak La, Nathu La and Jelep La passes.

== Dongkya range and Chola range ==
S. K. Samanta explains in the Indian Journal of Landscape Systems and Ecological Studies,

From Pauhunri emanates a large thrust, Dongkiya Range which strides southward for about 50 kilometre. It is separated from Tsen-gui kang by a fracturing belt of the Lachung chhu valley and leans over the Chola Range just north of Cho la (4435m).... The stream Rate chhu originates near Cho la which makes the boundary between North and East Sikkim, and ultimately plunges into the river Tista near Dikchu. The Range Chola extends further south for 20 kilometre along the eastern boundary of East Sikkim and acts as the water-divide between Rangpo-De chhu valleys lying in the district and Ammo chhu in Tibet..... De chhu excavates a narrow valley in south-eastern portion of the area, cuts deeply the last tip of Chola Range and ultimately flows southward through a glen to mark the boundary between Darjiling district and Bhutan.

== Political importance ==
It was established as the border between Sikkim and Tibet's Chumbi Valley by the 1890 Convention of Calcutta reached between British India and Qing China. The Convention deemed the Dongkya Range to end at Mount Gipmochi at the southern end, which was defined as the trijunction between India, Tibet and Bhutan. However, the Doklam plateau at the southern end gives rise to complications and the present day border dispute between Bhutan and China.

Dongkya Range is politically important; however, S. G. Burrard, H. H. Hayden and A. Heron comment that while Dongkya Range is politically important, "from a Himalayan point of view too great a topographical emphasis was given to them upon maps".

== Passes and peaks ==
=== Passes ===
- Dongkha La
- Cho La (Chola range)
- Yak La (Chola range)
- Nathu La (Chola range)
- Jelep La (Chola range)

=== Mountains ===
- Pauhunri (7,128 meters)
- Khangchengyao (6,889 meters)
- Gurudongmar (6,715 meters)
- Chugalung (5,759 meters)
- Dopendikang (5,359 meters)

== Gallery ==
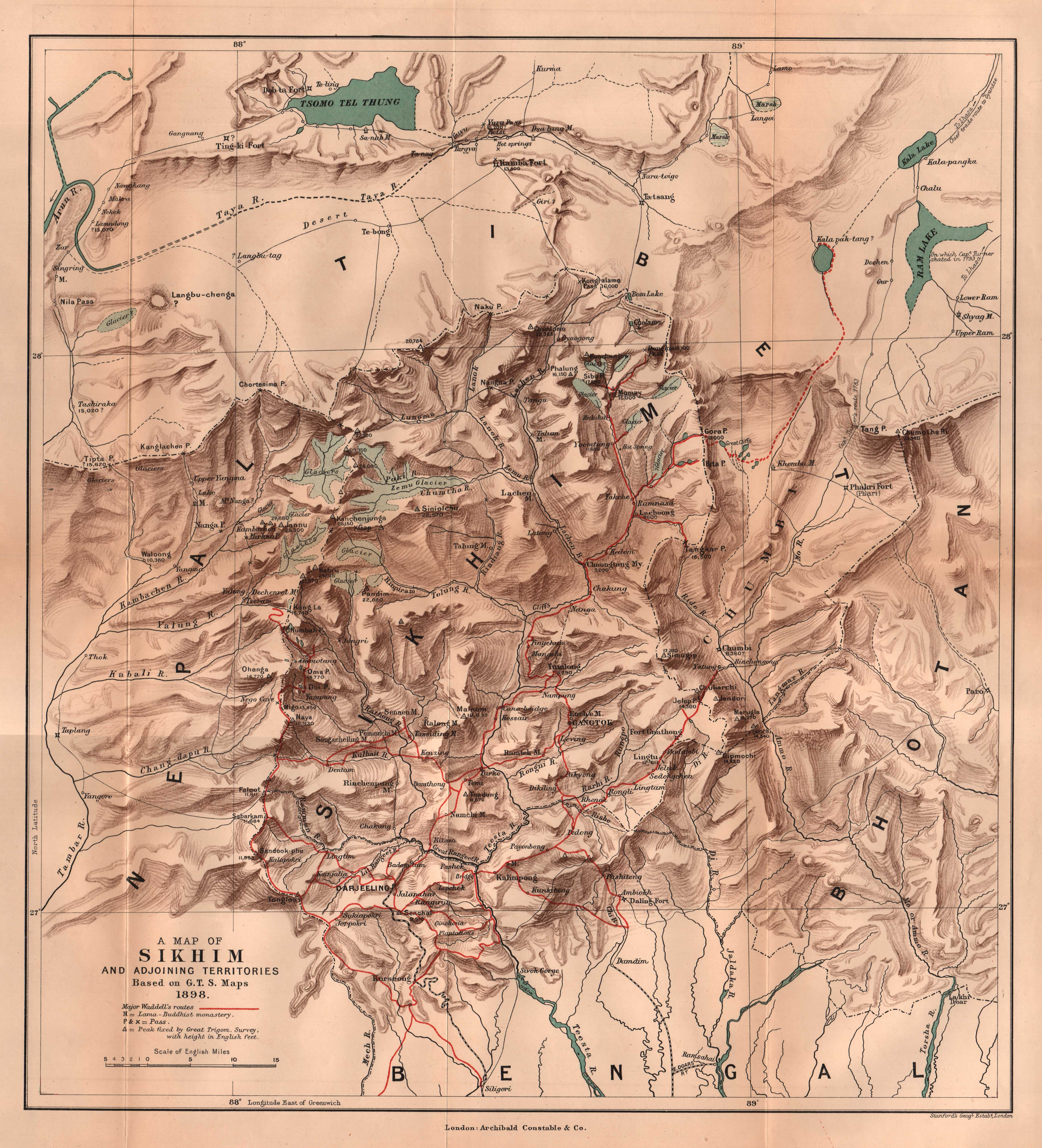
1898 Sikhim and adjoining territories by Laurence Waddell

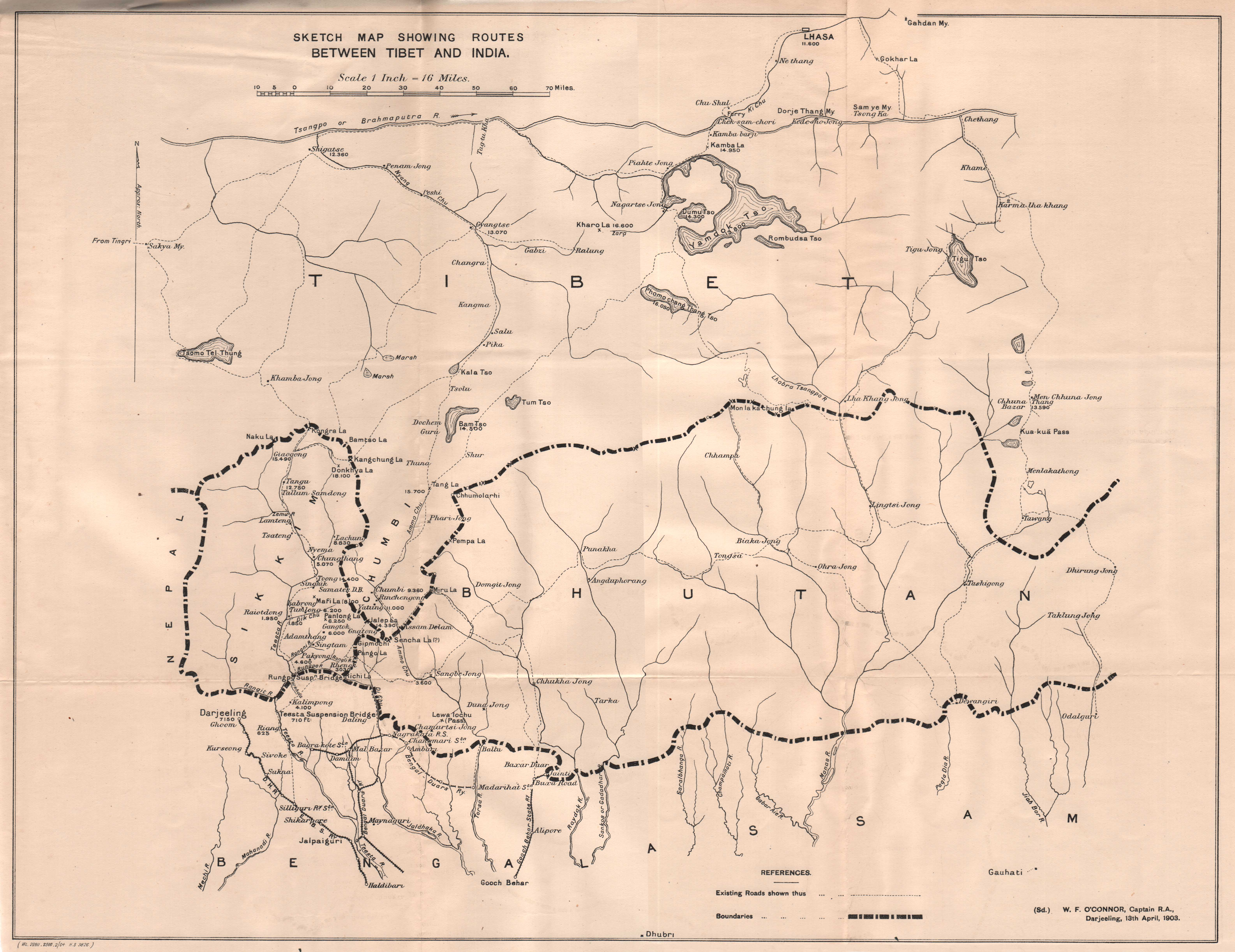
1903 by William O'Connor

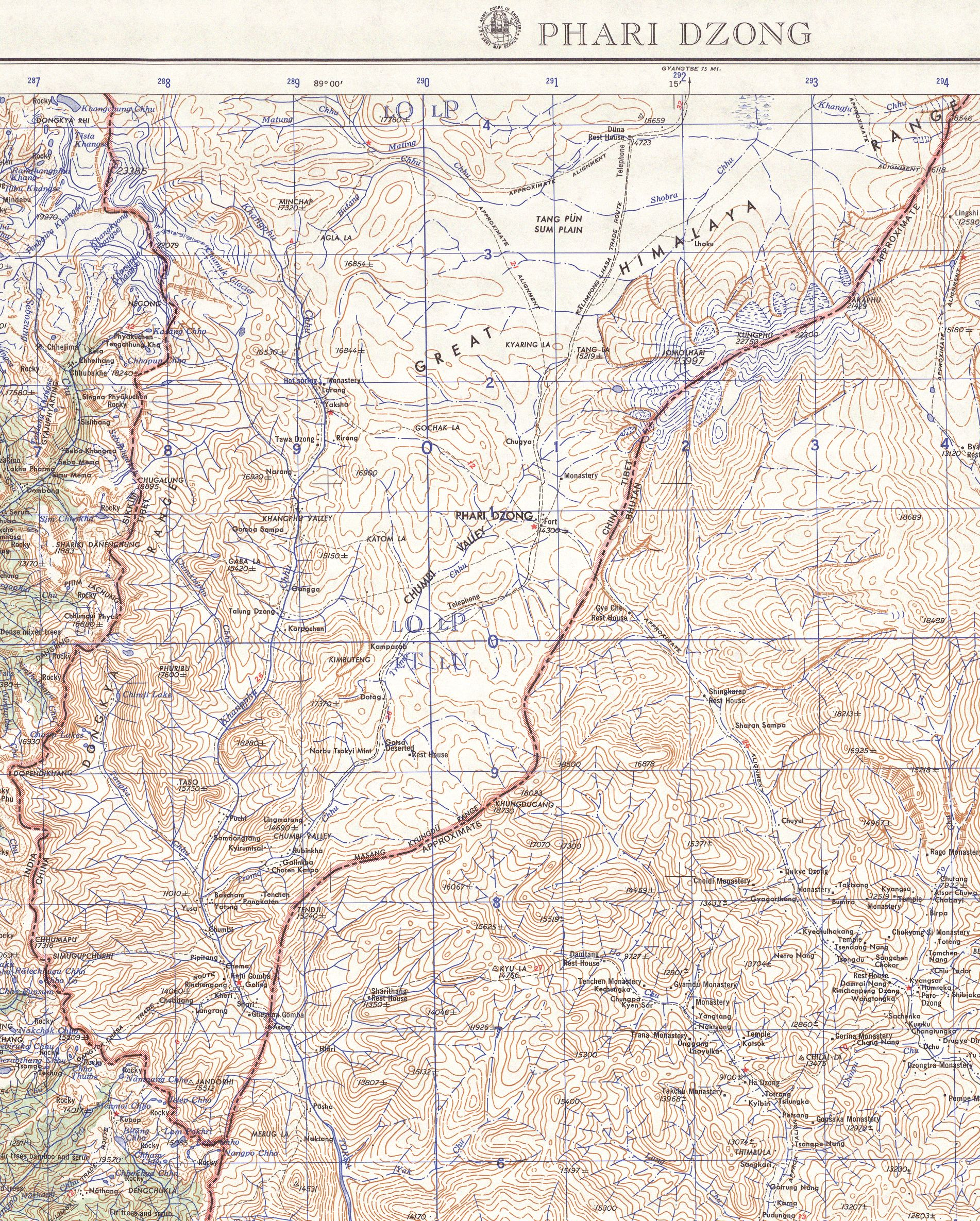
1955 by US Army Map Service

1965 by US Central Intelligence Agency

== References and notes ==
Notes

Citations

Bibliography

- Samanta, Samir Kumar (December 2019). "Geomorphic Units of The Sikkim Himalaya" (PDF). Indian Journal of Landscape Systems and Ecological Studies. 42 (2): 148. ISSN 0971-4170.
