= Nathu La =

Mountain pass on the Sikkim, India–China border

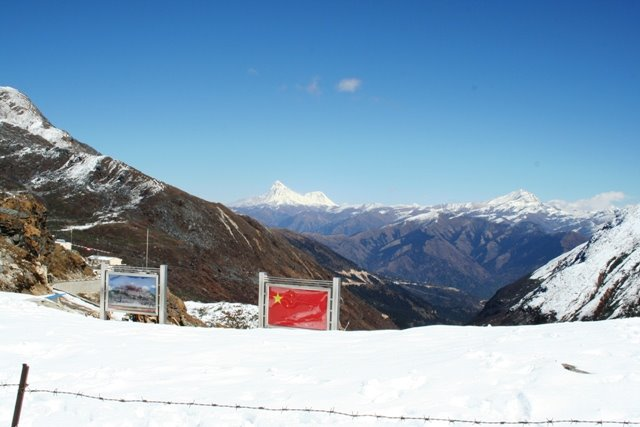
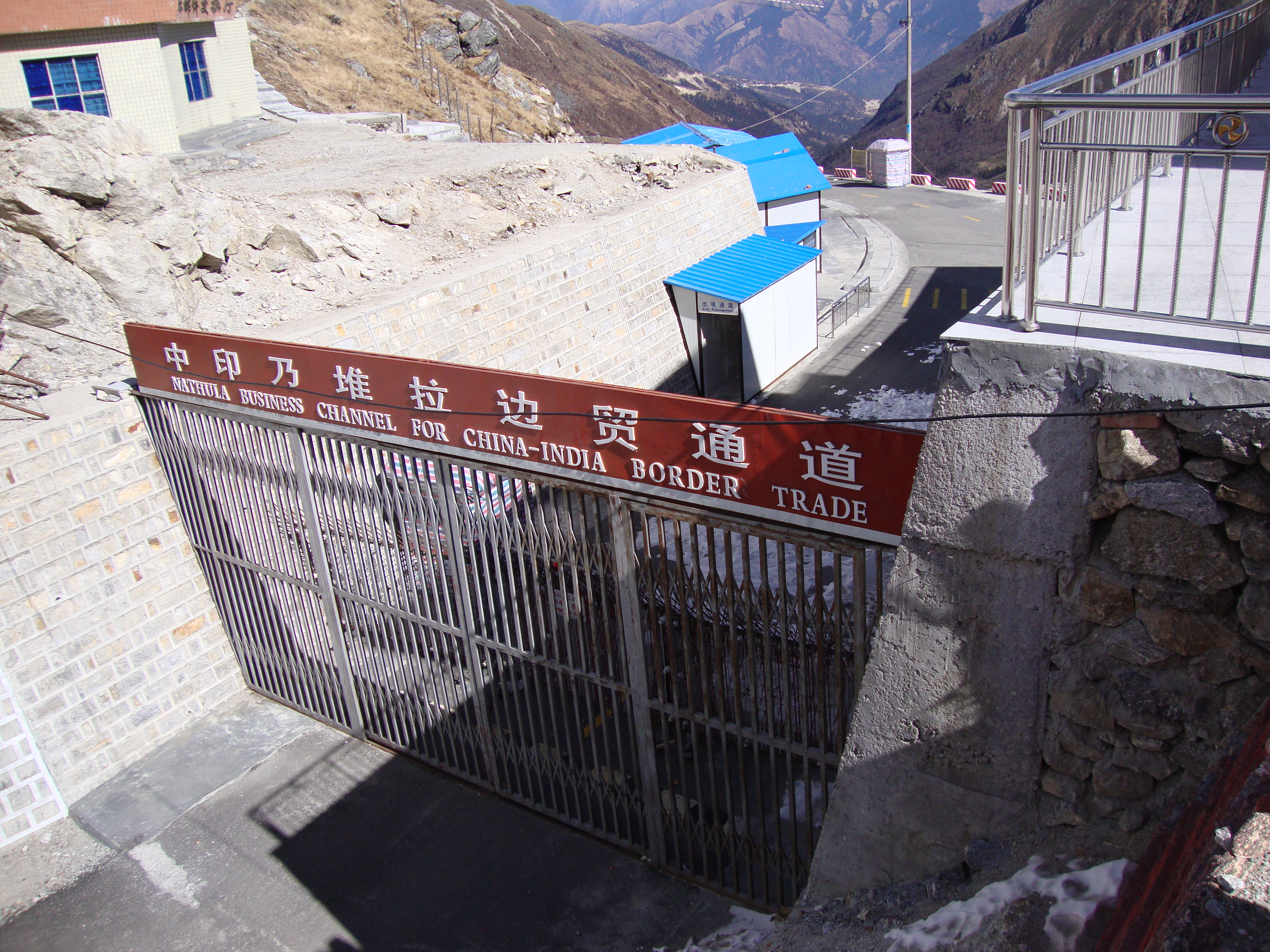
- Chumbi Valley visible from the Indian side (center). The main gate between the two sides (bottom). The stone walls were constructed in a build-up to the 2006 reopening.

- Location within Sikkim Location within Tibet
- Elevation: 4,310 m (14,140 ft)

Third Approach
- Location: Sikkim, India – Tibet, China
- Range: Dongkya Range, Himalaya
- Coordinates: 27°23′13″N 88°49′51″E

Nathu La

Nathu La (Note: Alternative spellings and variations include Nathu-la, Nathula, Natu La, Natö-la, Natöla, Natoi La, Nathui La, Gnatui, as well as its Tibetan transcription Rnathos La. and a Chinese transliteration Natuila.) (Tibetan: རྣ་ཐོས་ལ་, Wylie: Rna thos la, THL: Na tö la, Sikkimese: རྣ་ཐོས་ལ་) is a mountain pass in the Dongkya Range of the Himalayas between China's Yadong County in Tibet, and the Indian states of Sikkim. The pass, at 4,310 m (14,140 ft), connects the towns of Kalimpong and Gangtok to the villages and towns of the lower Chumbi Valley.

The pass was surveyed by J. W. Edgar in 1873, who described the pass as being used for trade by Tibetans. Francis Younghusband used the pass in 1903–04, as did a diplomatic British delegation to Lhasa in 1936–37, and Ernst Schäfer in 1938–39. In the 1950s, trade in the Kingdom of Sikkim used this pass. Diplomatically sealed by China and India after the 1962 Sino-Indian War, the pass saw skirmishes between the two countries in coming years, including the clashes in 1967 which resulted in fatalities on both sides. Nathu La has often been compared to Jelep La, a mountain pass situated at a distance of 3 miles (4.8 km).

The next few decades saw an improvement in ties leading to the re-opening of Nathu La in 2006. The opening of the pass provides an alternative route to the pilgrimage of Mount Kailash and Lake Manasarovar, and was expected to bolster the economy of the region by playing a key role in the growing Sino-Indian trade. However, while trade has had a net positive impact, it under-performed, and is limited to specific types of goods and to specific days of the week. Weather conditions including heavy snowfall restricts border trade to around 7 to 8 months.

Roads to the pass have been improved on both sides. Rail routes have been brought closer. It is part of the domestic tourist circuit in south-east Sikkim. Soldiers from both sides posted at Nathu La are among the closest along the entire Sino-India border. It is also one of the five Border Personnel Meeting points between the two armies of both countries. 2020 border tensions and the coronavirus pandemic have affected tourism and movement across the pass.

== Climate ==
Climate data for Nathula
Month	Jan	Feb	Mar	Apr	May	Jun	Jul	Aug	Sep	Oct	Nov	Dec	Year
Mean daily maximum °C (°F)	−8 (18)	−7 (19)	−3 (27)	−1 (30)	3 (37)	5 (41)	7 (45)	10 (50)	8 (46)	6 (43)	1 (34)	−6 (21)	1 (34)
Mean daily minimum °C (°F)	−28 (−18)	−25 (−13)	−14 (7)	−5 (23)	0 (32)	2 (36)	3 (37)	4 (39)	2 (36)	−5 (23)	−10 (14)	−20 (−4)	−8 (18)
Average precipitation mm (inches)	15 (0.6)	34 (1.3)	57 (2.2)	83 (3.3)	95 (3.7)	129 (5.1)	175 (6.9)	135 (5.3)	129 (5.1)	50 (2.0)	30 (1.2)	18 (0.7)	950 (37.4)
Source: https://en.climate-data.org/asia/india/sikkim/Nathula-633509/

== Name and meaning ==
The name "Nathu La" is traditionally interpreted as "the whistling pass", or more commonly as the "listening ears pass". The Chinese government explains it as "a place where snow is deepest and the wind strongest". According to G. S. Bajpai, it means "flat ground from where the hill features gradually rise to right and left". Lepcha people who are native to the region call it ma-tho hlo/na tho lo; which may have possibly evolved to the present usage of the word.

== Geography ==
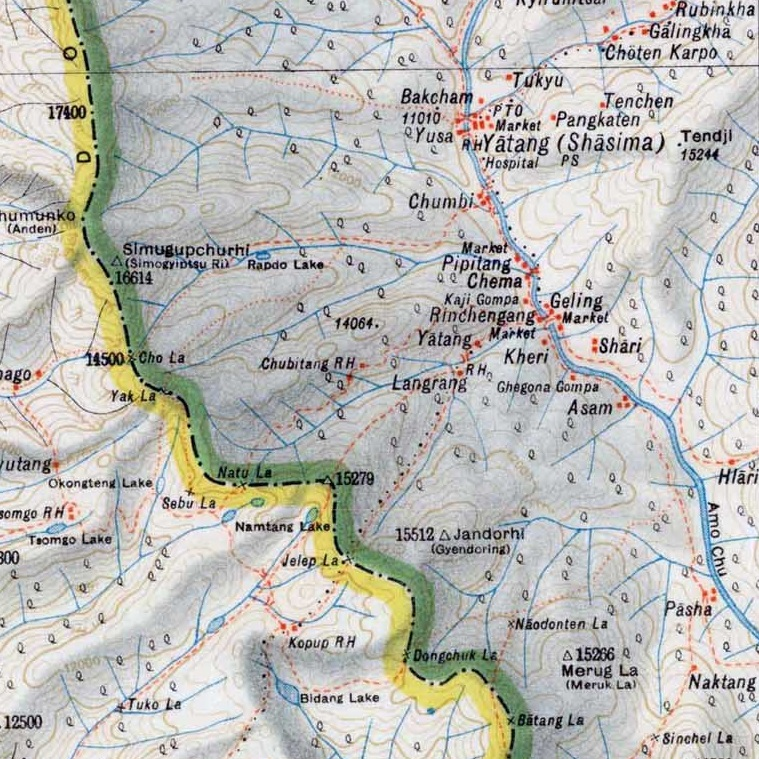
Map of south-east Sikkim and lower Chumbi Valley (Survey of India, 1923): Nathu La, labelled 'Natu La', depicted with a cart track passing through it.

Nathu La is a mountain pass on the Dongkya Range that separates Sikkim and the Chumbi Valley at an elevation of 14,250 feet (4,340 m). (Note: Other elevations mentioned include 14,140 feet (4,310 m), and 14,790 feet (4,510 m).) The pass is 52–54 kilometres (32–34 mi) east of Gangtok, the capital of Sikkim, and 35 kilometres (22 mi) from Yatung Shasima, the headquarters of the Yadong County (or the Chumbi Valley).

Nathu La is one of the three frequently-used passes between Sikkim and the Chumbi Valley, the other two being Cho La and Jelep La. Historically, Nathu La served Gangtok, while Cho La served the former Sikkim capital Tumlong and Jelep La served Kalimpong in West Bengal. Nathu La is mere 3 miles (4.8 km) northwest of Jelep La, as the crow flies, but the travel distance could be as much as 10 miles (16 km). On the Tibetan side, the Chola route led to Chumbi, the Nathu La route led to a village called Chema and the Jelep La route led to Rinchengang, all in the lower Chumbi Valley.

Even today, heavy snowfall causes the closure of the pass, with temperatures as low as −25 °C (−13 °F) and strong winds.

== History ==
The Nathu La and Jelep La passes were part of the trade routes of the British Empire during the 19th and early 20th century.

=== British Empire ===
The British Raj brought the Kingdom of Sikkim under their protectorate in 1861 and wished to promote trade with Tibet through Sikkim. In 1873, J. W. Edgar, the Deputy commissioner at Darjeeling, was asked to investigate the trading conditions and make recommendations for a preferred route. Edgar reported active trade running through the Nathu La pass ("Gnatui pass" in his terminology), which was linked to Gangtok as well as Darjeeling. The traders found significantly higher value for their goods at Darjeeling than at Gangtok. However, Edgar preferred the neighbouring Jelep La pass on physical grounds, and recommended building a road to that pass along with a trade mart close to it. Edgar wrote,

On the whole, I am not inclined to recommend that Guntuck [Gangtok] should be chosen for the mart, and rather think that ... Dumsong [Damsang] might be preferable to any of the lower elevations of Sikhim. It is true that the distance from the Jeylep Pass [Jelep La] to Dumsong is greater than that from the Gnatui to Guntuck,.... But to counterbalance this, the best route from the Thibet boundary to the foot of the Chola range is that by the Jeylep Pass.

In 1903–04 Francis Younghusband led a British military expedition into Lhasa consisting of 1,150 soldiers and over 10,000 support staff and pack animals. The first choice of crossing into the Chumbi Valley had been a pass north of Nathu La, the Yak La. Yak La provided the shortest route from Gangtok to Sikkim's eastern frontier, however the eastern descent proved too steep and dangerous. Both Nathu La and Jelep La were used by the expedition, with Nathu La becoming the main communication channel.

In 1936–37, a diplomatic British delegation to Lhasa including B. J. Gould and F. S. Chapman used the Nathu La pass. Chapman writes that during their journey from Gangtok to Nathu la, just at the foot of the pass, was a road leading to the right and a signbord indicating Kupup. This route would have put them onto the Kalimpong-Lhasa route via Jelep La. Chapman writes that "From Gangtok the mule-track starts for the Natu La, and from Kalimpong the longer and more difficult road leaves for the Jelep La. By these two passes the road from Lhasa crosses the main range of the Himalaya on its way to India..." Chapman goes on to write that from the summit of the pass, if it were not for the mist, the delegation would have been able to see Chomolhari. At the summit, Chapman writes of groups of stones and prayer flags these were not only for the protection of travelers, but they marked the boundary between Sikkim and Tibet. The road near the pass was paved with stones. The first stop after the pass was Champithang, a resting place for the British on the way to Lhasa.

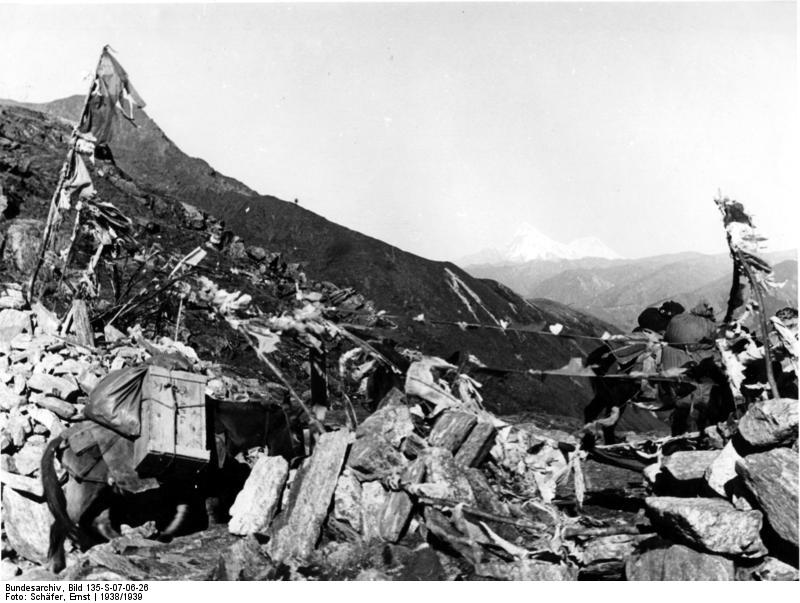
The German expedition to Tibet crossing Nathu La.

In 1938–39 Ernst Schäfer led a German expedition to Tibet legally via Nathu La on the orders of Heinrich Himmler. This expedition also came across no gates or barriers at the pass, the border; only a ladze, prayer flags and a cairn.

=== Post founding of PRC and independent India ===
In 1949, when the Tibetan government expelled the Chinese living there, most of the displaced Chinese returned home through the Nathu La–Sikkim–Kolkata route.

The Kingdom of Sikkim had flourishing trade during the 1950s. Calcutta was linked with Lhasa via Chumbi Valley, with Nathu La being one of the main routes for passage. The majority of trade between China and India during those years was via this route. Some traders from India even set up their shop in Yadong. Goods exported to China included medicines, fuel, and disassembled cars. India imported wool and silk. Mules and horses would be the main transit vehicle during those years.

Construction to make the Gangtok–Nathu La road motorable started in 1954. It was completed and formally opened in the presence of the Chogyal of Sikkim by Jawaharlal Nehru on 17 September 1958. At the time the motorable road ended at Sherathang. However, the Chinese did not take up the construction of the road on their side at the time. The Dalai Lama, Tenzin Gyatso, used this pass to travel to India for the 2,500th birthday celebration of Gautama Buddha, in the autumn of 1956.

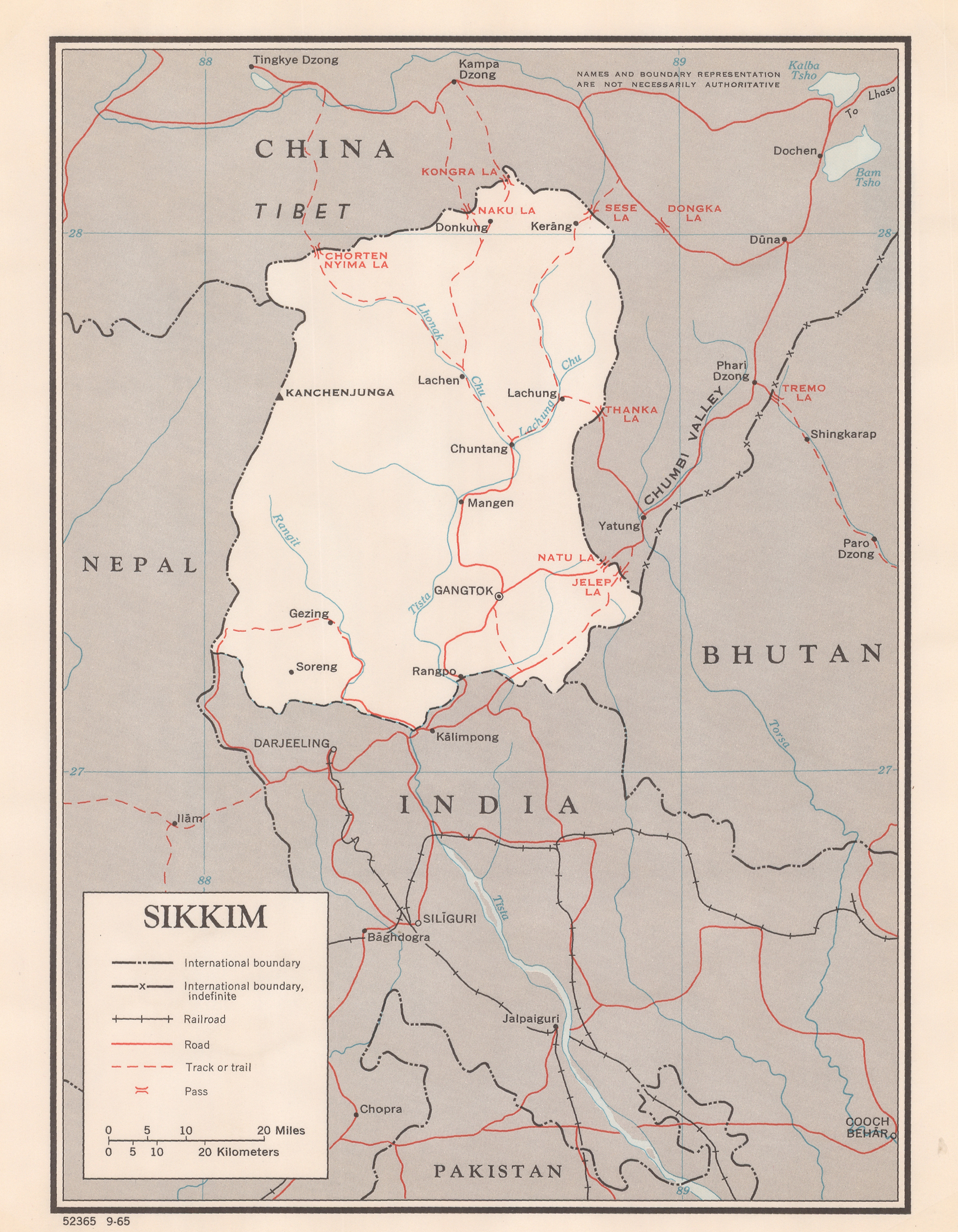
Sikkim, Chumbi Valley, with the Nathu La pass (CIA, 1965).

After the People's Republic of China took control of Tibet in 1950 and suppressed a Tibetan uprising in 1959, the passes into Sikkim became a conduit for refugees from Tibet. During the 1962 Sino-Indian War, Nathu La witnessed skirmishes between soldiers of the two countries. Shortly thereafter, the passage was sealed and remained closed for more than four decades.

During the Indo-Pakistani War of 1965, China exerted pressure on India diplomatically and militarily. In September 1965, China reinforced Yatung and nearby mountain passes with another infantry regiment. India also had a build-up in this area. On the south-eastern front of Sikkim the four passes of Nathu La, Jelep La, Cho La and Dongju had 9, 37, 1 and 9 Indian positions respectively. This build-up was influenced by the region's proximity to East Pakistan, and the tensions that remained following the 1962 war. Following Chinese pressure, Indian troops at Nathu La and Jelep La received orders to withdraw. Nathu La was under Major General Sagat Singh and he refused to withdraw. As a result, in the coming few days, Jelep La was occupied by the Chinese while Nathu La remained defended under India.

The coming months saw both sides tussle over dominance in Chumbi Valley. Numerous Indian incursions were reported by Chinese sources. At Nathu La, differing perceptions of the Line of Actual Control among frontline troops on both sides factored in to the increasing tensions. Trench digging, laying of barbed wires, patrolling, celebrating Independence Day, every action became contentious. Between 7 and 13 September 1967, China's People's Liberation Army (PLA) and the Indian Army had a number of border clashes at Nathu La and Cho La, including the exchange of heavy artillery fire. Numerous casualties were reported on both sides.

In 1975, following a referendum, Sikkim acceded to India and Nathu La became part of Indian territory. China, however, refused to acknowledge the accession, but the two armies continued to maintain informal communication at the border despite the freeze in diplomatic relations. In 1988 the visit of Prime Minister Rajiv Gandhi to China marked the beginning of fresh talks between the two countries.

=== 2006 re-opening ===
In 2003, with the thawing of Sino-Indian relations, Indian Prime Minister Atal Bihari Vajpayee's visit to China led to the resumption of talks on opening the border. The border agreements signed in 2003 were pursuant to the "Memorandum on the Resumption of Border Trade" signed in December 1991, and "Protocol on Entry and Exit Procedures for Border Trade" signed in July 1992. The 2003 "Memorandum on Expanding Border Trade" made applicable and expanded the provisions of the 1991 and 1992 agreements to Nathu La.

In August 2003, the Chief Minister of Sikkim Pawan Chamling shook hands with a PLA soldier along the border and followed it up by giving his wristwatch. The PLA soldier in return gave the Chief Minister a packet of cigarettes. This signaled the return of trade to Nathu La. The formal opening was postponed a number of times between mid-2004 to mid-2006. Finally, after remaining sealed for decades, Nathu La was officially opened on 6 July 2006, becoming one of the three open trading border posts between China and India at the time, the other two being Shipki La and Lipulekh pass. The reopening, which was a part of a number of political moves by China and India with regard to the formal recognition of Tibet and Sikkim as part of either country respectively, coincided with the birthday of the reigning Dalai Lama.

The opening of the pass was marked by a ceremony on the Indian side that was attended by officials from both countries. A delegation of 100 traders from each side crossed the border to respective trading towns. Despite heavy rain and chilly winds, the ceremony was marked by the attendance of many officials, locals, and international and local media. The barbed wire fence between India and China was replaced by a 10 m (30 ft) wide stone-walled passageway. 2006 was also marked as the year of Sino-Indian friendship. It has been postulated that the reasons for opening the pass on both sides included economic and strategic ones, including that of stabilizing the borderlands.

The narrative surrounding the reopening of the pass highlighted border trade, the ancient Silk Road, and the ancient linkages between the two "civilisations". Anthropologist Tina Harris explains that this state-based narrative diverged from the regional narrative. While silk had been one of the commodities traded, this region saw a much larger trade of wool. A trader told Harris that the route should have been called the "wool route". Harris explains that this narrative of Nathu La rather highlighted the "contemporary global discourse"—that of a globalising and inter-connected Asia finding its place in the world, of which Sikkim and Chumbi Valley were a part.

=== Post 2006 ===
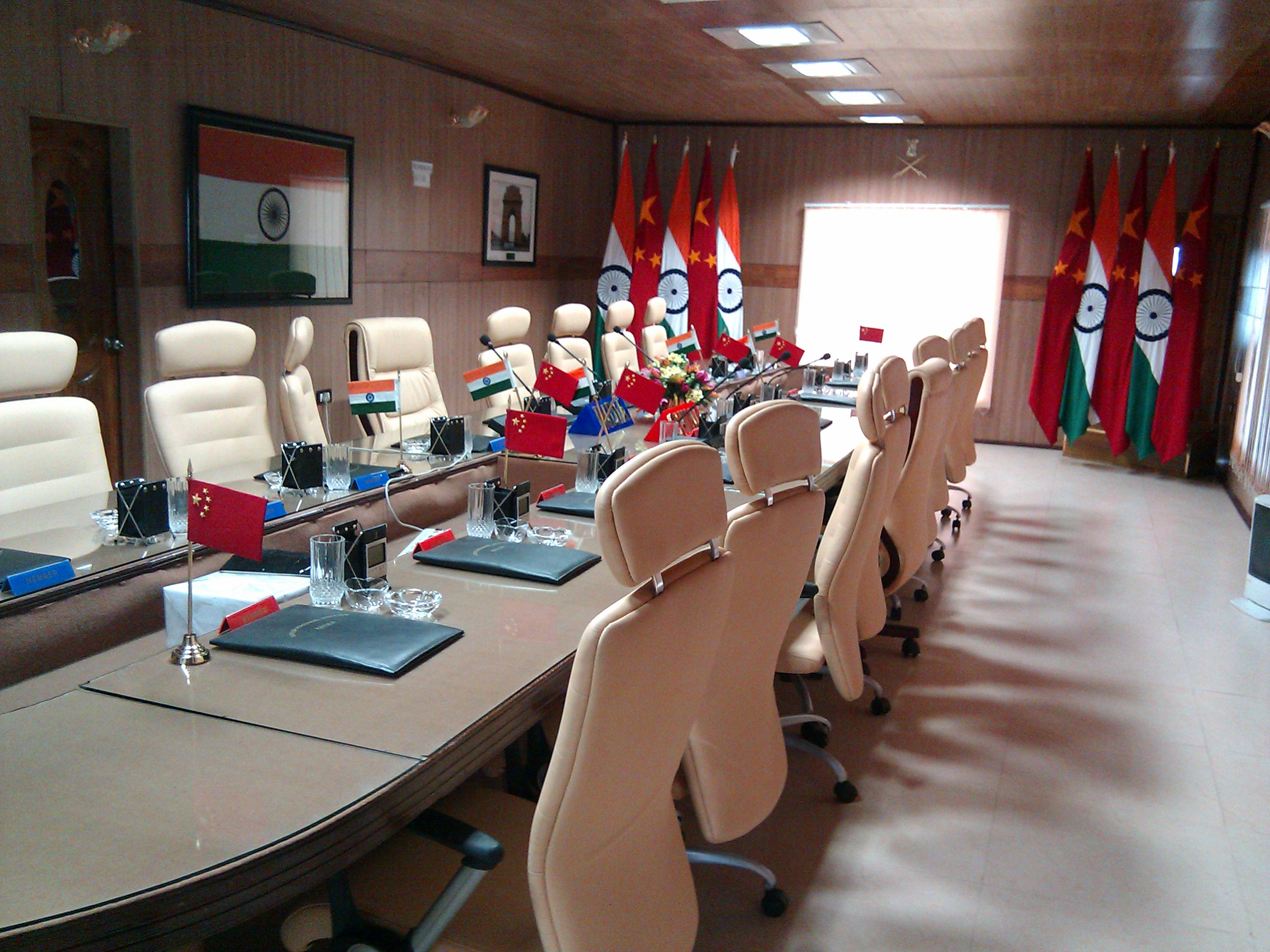
The Indo–China BPM point at Nathu La on the Indian side.

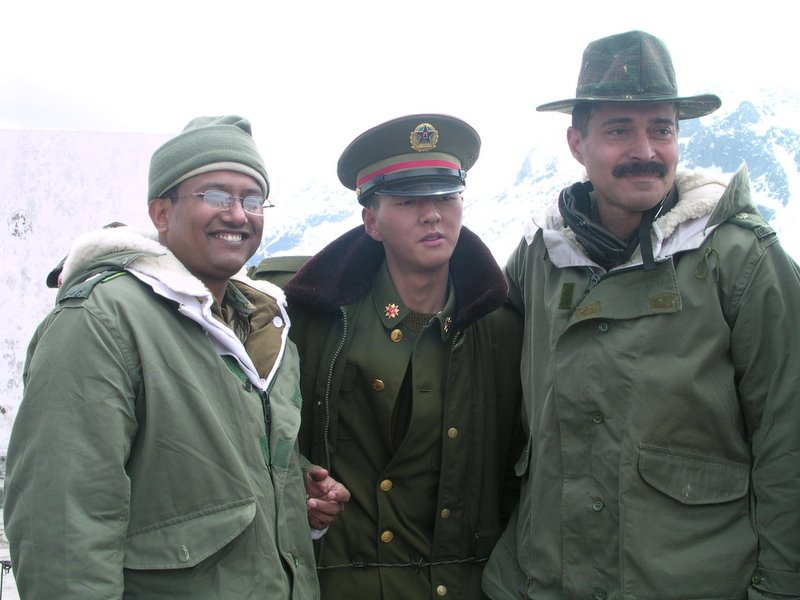
Indian and Chinese officers at Nathu La. A barbed wire separates them.

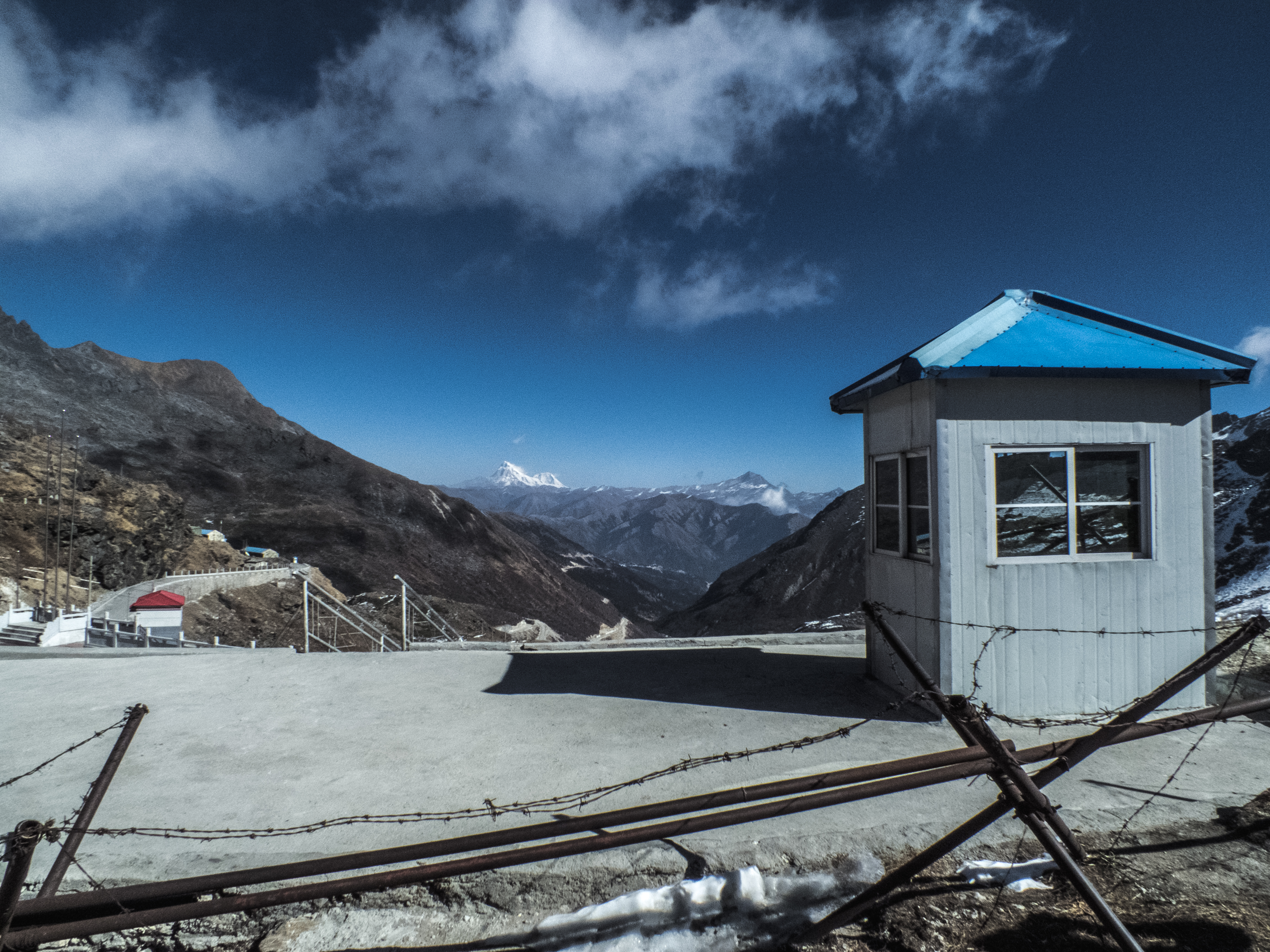
A Chinese post at Nathu La. Jomolhari visible in the distance.

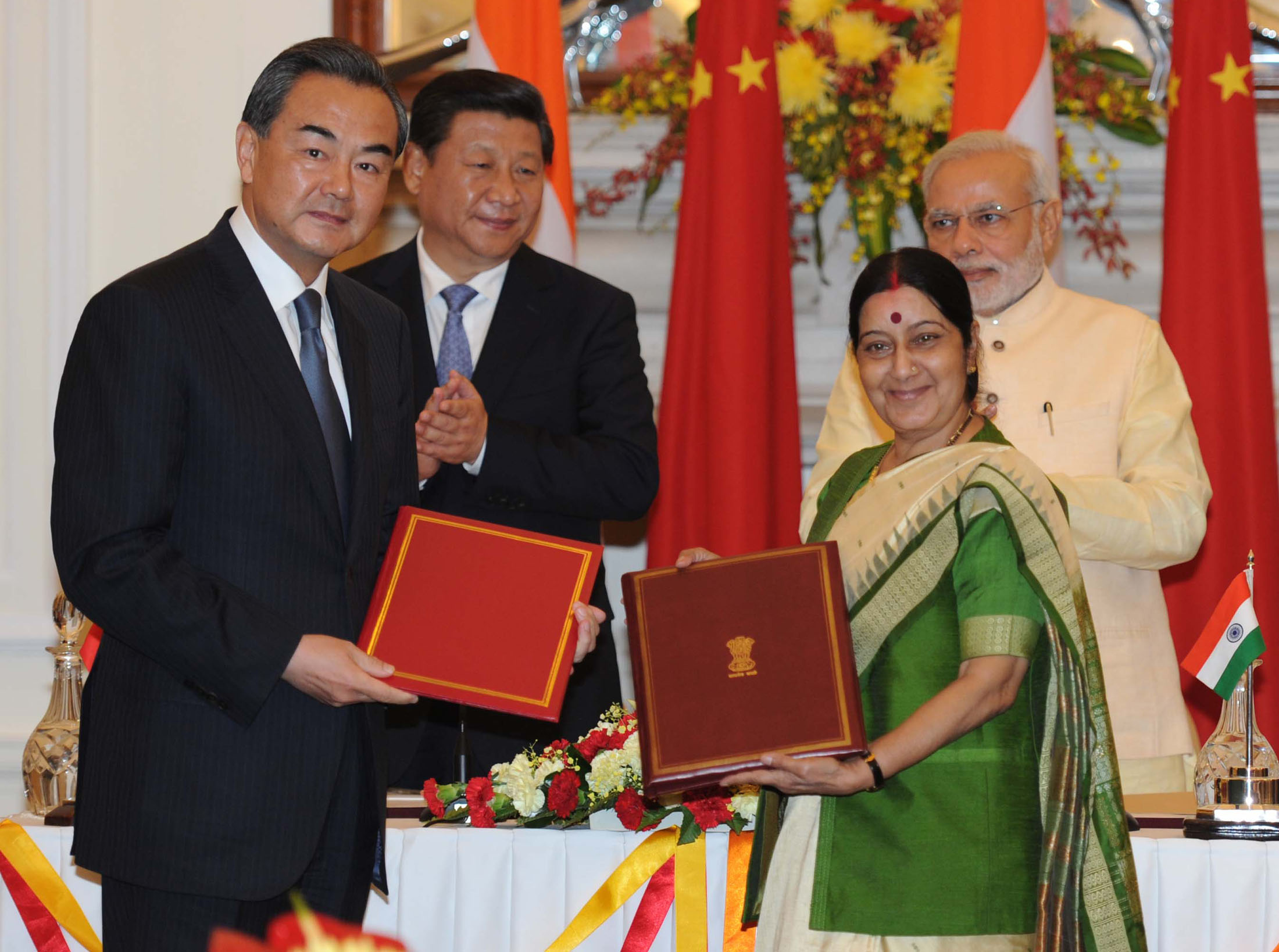
MoU being signed to open an alternative pilgrimage route through Nathu La.

Nathu La is one of the five officially agreed Border Personnel Meeting (BPM) points between the Indian Army and the People's Liberation Army of China for regular consultations and interactions between the two armies. During the 2008 Tibetan unrest, hundreds of Tibetans in India marched to and protested at Nathu La. In 2009, Narendra Modi, as the Chief Minister of Gujarat, visited the pass. In 2010, the Queen's Baton Relay for the Commonwealth Games that year also stopped at main trade gate at the pass. In 2015, Nathu La opened for tourists and pilgrims going to Kailash Mansarovar.

Amidst the 2017 China–India border standoff centered around Doklam, the pilgrimage via Nathu La was cancelled. The border tensions also affected trade through the pass. The standoff officially ended at the end of August 2017; and in October India's Defence Minister Nirmala Sitharaman made a goodwill visit to Nathu La, also briefly interacting with Chinese soldiers at the pass. In 2018, a "Special Border Personnel meeting" took place at the pass to mark the foundation day of the PLA. On Yoga Day in 2019, Chinese soldiers and civilians participated in joint yoga exercises at Nathu La.

In 2019 road conditions impacted movement across the pass. In April 2020, following the coronavirus pandemic, the Sikkim government closed the pass. The Kailash-Mansarovar pilgrimage through Nathu La would also remain shut. Further, fresh political and border tensions and skirmishes in 2020 also affected trade. This coronavirus pandemic–border tension situation continued into 2021, impacting movement across the pass. As of October 2024, the pass is popular with tourists on the Indian side.

== Flora and fauna ==
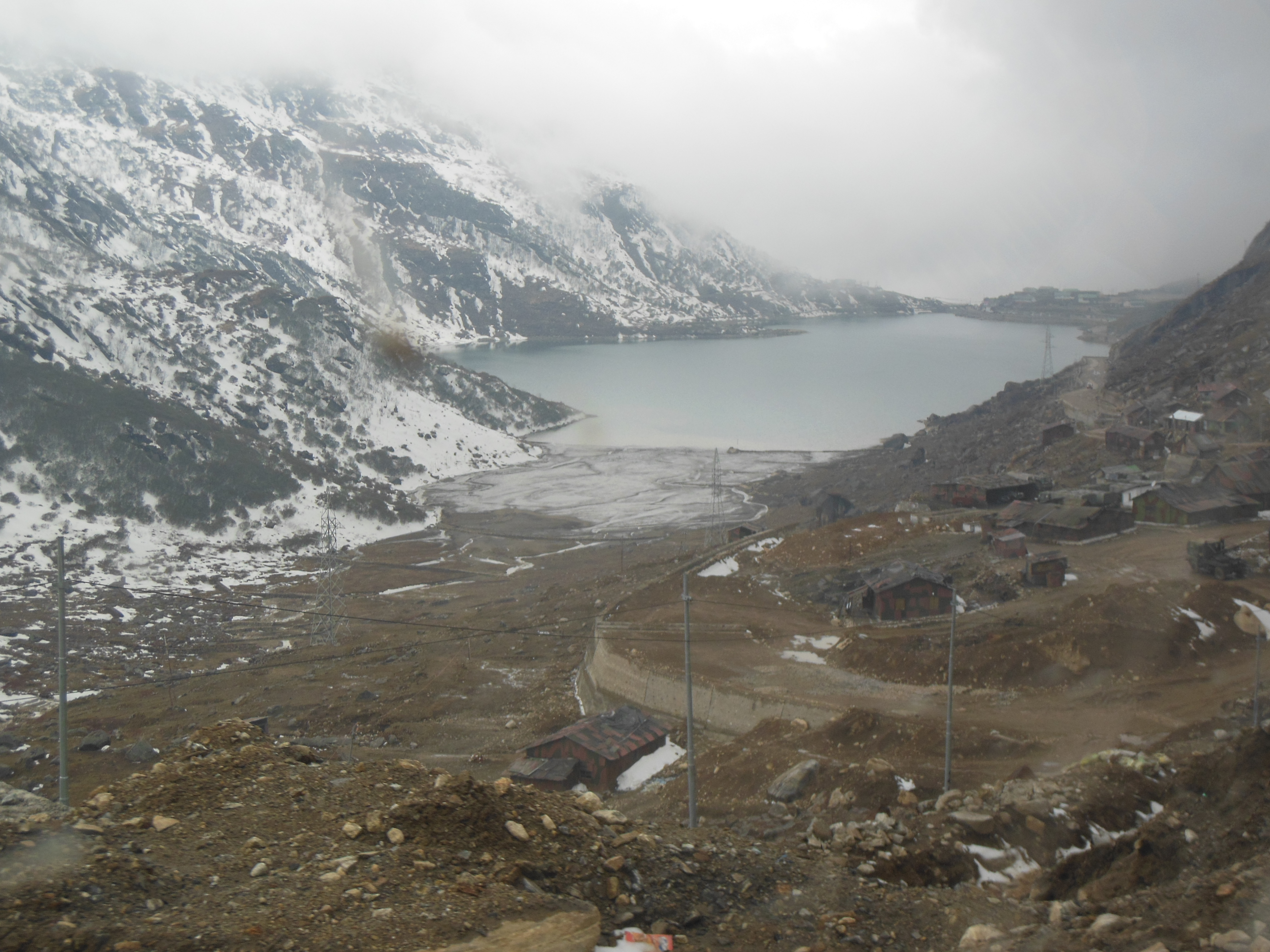
Lake Tsomgo near Nathu La.

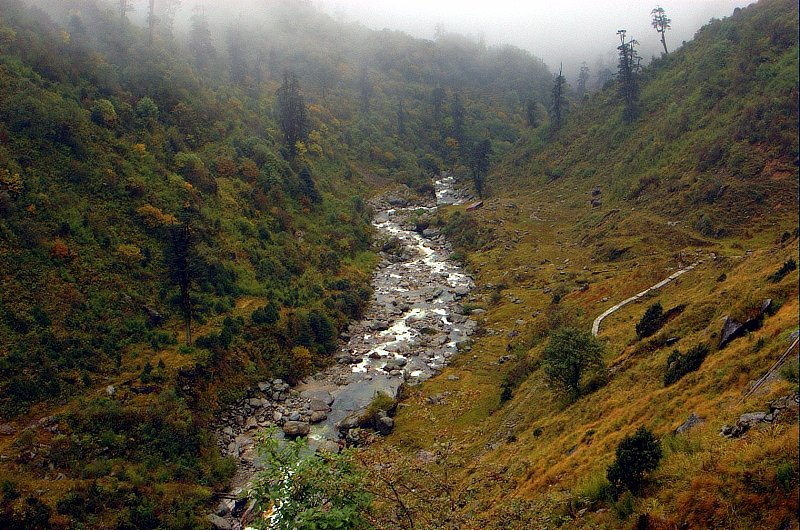
Vegetation of the region.

In 1910 Scottish botanist W. W. Smith visited the area. Vegetation he listed included species of Caltha scaposa, Cochlearia, Potentilla, Saussurea, Rhododendron, Cassiope, Primula, Corydalis, Arenaria, Saxifraga, Chrysosplenium, Pimpinella, Cyananthus, Campanula, Androsace, Eritrichium, Lagotis and Salvia. Rhododendrons nobile and marmots have been seen on the ascent of the pass.

Because of the steep elevation increase around the pass, the vegetation graduates from sub-tropical forest at its base, to a temperate region, to a wet and dry alpine climate, and finally to cold tundra desert devoid of vegetation. Around Nathu La and the Tibetan side, the region has little vegetation besides scattered shrubs. Major species found in the region include dwarf rhododendrons (Rhododendron anthopogon, R. setosum) and junipers. The meadows include the genera Poa, Meconopsis, Pedicularis, Primula, and Aconitum. The region has a four-month growing season during which grasses, sedges, and medicinal herbs grow abundantly and support a host of insects, wild and domestic herbivores, larks, and finches. The nearby Kyongnosla Alpine Sanctuary has rare, endangered ground orchida and rhododendrons interspersed among tall junipers and silver firs.

There are no permanent human settlements in the region, though it has a large number of defence personnel who man the borders on both sides. A small number of nomadic Tibetan graziers or Dokpas herd yak, sheep and pashmina-type goats in the region. There has been intense grazing pressure due to domestic and wild herbivores on the land. Yaks are found in these parts, and in many hamlets they serve as beasts of burden. The region around Nathu La contains many endangered species, including Tibetan gazelle, snow leopard, Tibetan wolf, Tibetan snowcock, lammergeier, raven, golden eagle, and ruddy shelduck. Feral dogs are considered a major hazard in this region. The presence of landmines in the area causes casualties among yak, nayan, kiang, and Tibetan wolf.

The avifauna consists of various types of laughing thrushes, which live in shrubs and on the forest floor. The blue whistling-thrush, redstarts, and forktails are found near waterfalls and hill-streams. The mixed hunting species present in the region include warblers, tit-babblers, treecreepers, white-eyes, wrens, and rose finches. Raptors such as black eagle, black-winged kite and kestrels; and pheasants such as monals and blood pheasant are also found.

== Economy ==
=== Trade ===
View source data.
Sikkim-TAR trade via Nathu-la, volume of exports and imports

Up until 1962, before the pass was sealed, goods such as pens, watches, cereals, cotton cloth, edible oils, soaps, building materials, and dismantled scooters and four-wheelers were exported to Tibet through the pass on mule-back. Two hundred mules, each carrying about 80 kilograms (180 lb) of load, were used to ferry goods from Gangtok to Lhasa, which used to take 20–25 days. Upon return, silk, raw wool, musk pods, medicinal plants, country liquor, precious stones, gold, and silverware were imported into India. Most of the trade in those days was carried out by the Marwari community, which owned 95% of the 200 authorised firms.

The Nathu La Trade Study Group (NTSG) was set up by the state government of Sikkim in 2003 to study the scope of border trade in Sikkim with specific focus on Nathu La, which was scheduled to reopen. The informal group, consisting of civil servants and trade experts, was headed by Mahendra P. Lama and submitted its report in 2005. The report laid down two projections, a "higher projection", and a "lower projection". The lower projection estimated border trade through Nathu La at ₹353 crore (US$37 million) by 2010, ₹450 crore (US$47 million) by 2015 and ₹574 crore (US$60 million) by 2020. The higher projection estimated border trade through Nathu La ₹12,203 crore (US$1.3 billion) by 2015. India's Confederation of Indian Industry (CII) gave an even higher estimation that trade could cross USD 10 billion in a decade.

These figures were also based upon policy recommendations in the paper. While the trade may not have met the study group's estimate, which 15 years later seem "over ambitious", it has benefitted the impacted areas positively. Ancillary benefits were also highlighted by the report such as revenue for truckers even with low volumes of vehicle movement. Since July 2006, trading is open Mondays through Thursdays. In 2006 India exempted 29 items for export and 15 items for import from duty. In 2012, 12 more items were added to the list. Apart from illegal items, China did not put any restrictions on the border trade in 2006.

India's export and import list with respect to Nathu La trade (2006 list with 2012 additions)
Exports
2006
1. Agriculture Implements
2. Blankets
3. Copper Products
4. Clothes
5. Cycles
6. Coffee
7. Tea
8. Barley
9. Rice
10. Flour
11. Dry Fruits
12. Dry and Fresh Vegetables
13. Vegetable Oil
14. Gur and Misri
15. Tobacco
16. Snuff
17. Cigarettes
18. Canned Food
19. Agro Chemical
20. Local Herbs
21. Dyes
22. Spices
23. Watches
24. Shoes
25. Kerosene
26. Stationary
27. Utensil
28. Wheat
29. Textiles

2012

1. Processed Food Items
2. Flowers
3. Fruit and Spices
4. Religious Products
5. Readymade Garment
6. Handicraft and Handloom Products
7. Local Herbal Medicine
Imports
2006
1. Goat Skin
2. Sheep Skin
3. Wool
4. Raw Silk
5. Yak Tails
6. China Clay
7. Borax
8. Yak Hair
9. Szaibelyita
10. Butter
11. Goat Cashmere (Pasham)
12. Common Salt
13. Horses
14. Goats
15. Sheep

2012

1. Readymade Garments
2. Shoes
3. Carpets
4. Quilt/Blankets
5. Local Herbal Medicine

Projection of trade (high and low) by NTSG and actual present volume of trade from 2006 to 2015
Years	NTSG Projection (₹ crore)	Actual Trade (₹ crore)	Percentage fulfilled
Low projections
2006–2010	353	6.54	1.85%
2006–2015	450	114.60	25.46%
High projections
2006–2010	2266	6.54	0.29%
2006–2015	12203	114.60	0.93%
Sources: NTSG report 2005; Department of Commerce and Industries (Sikkim) 2016

The reopening of the pass was expected to stimulate the economy of the region and bolster Indo-Chinese trade, however the result has been underwhelming. In 2008, Mahendra P. Lama commented upon the mismatch in projections and actual trade during the first two years, "this is mostly attributed to poor road conditions, nascent infrastructural facilities, limited tradable items and lukewarm attitude of the policy-makers." Road limitations also constricted the size and number of trucks that can use the route. Further, there is a large mismatch between Indian and Chinese thinking with regard to trade through Sikkim, and a large mismatch with regard to on-the-ground infrastructure development with regard to supporting trade through Nathu La. In 2010 and 2011 there were no imports from China via the pass according to Government of Sikkim data. Weather also restricts trade to about 7 to 8 months and roughly between May and November.

There were concerns among some traders in India that Indian goods would find a limited outlet in Tibet, while China would have access to a ready market in Sikkim and West Bengal. A concern of the Indian government is also the trafficking of wildlife products such as tiger and leopard skins and bones, bear gall bladders, otter pelts, and shahtoosh wool into India. The Indian government has undertaken a program to sensitise the police and other law enforcement agencies in the area.

=== Tourism ===
Nathu La is part of the tourist circuit in eastern Sikkim. On the Indian side, only citizens of India can visit the pass on Thursdays to Sundays, after obtaining permits one day in advance in Gangtok. There is no 'no man's land' at the pass. Minimal military presence and barbed wire separates both sides. Tourists informally shake hands and take photographs with the Chinese soldiers and army office in the background. Only meters apart, soldiers at Nathu La are among the closest soldiers along the entire Sino-India border. Domestic tourism at the pass was opened up in 1999.

Tourist locations on the Indian side

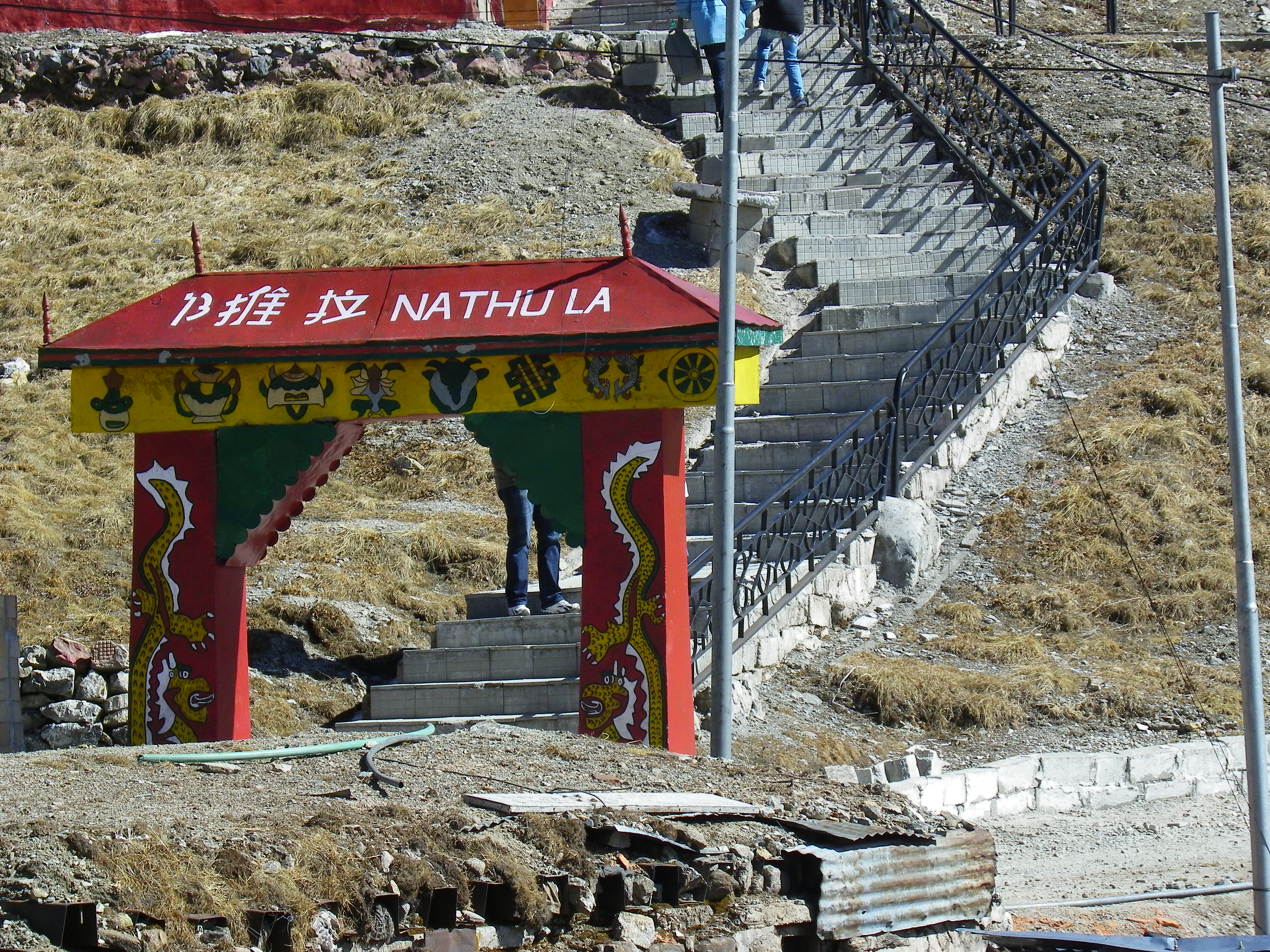
Stairs leading to the Indian side of the border.

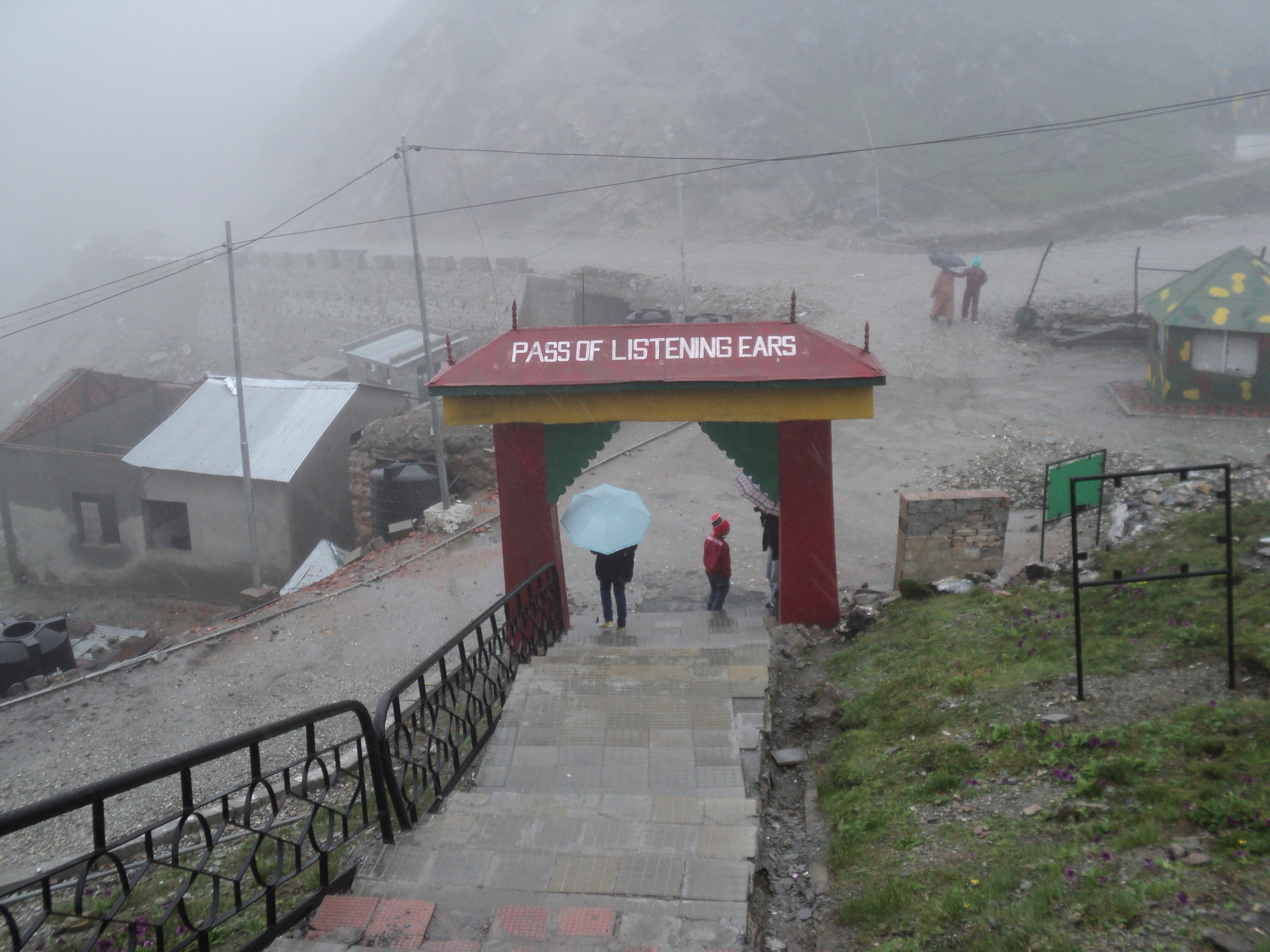
"Pass of Listening Ears"

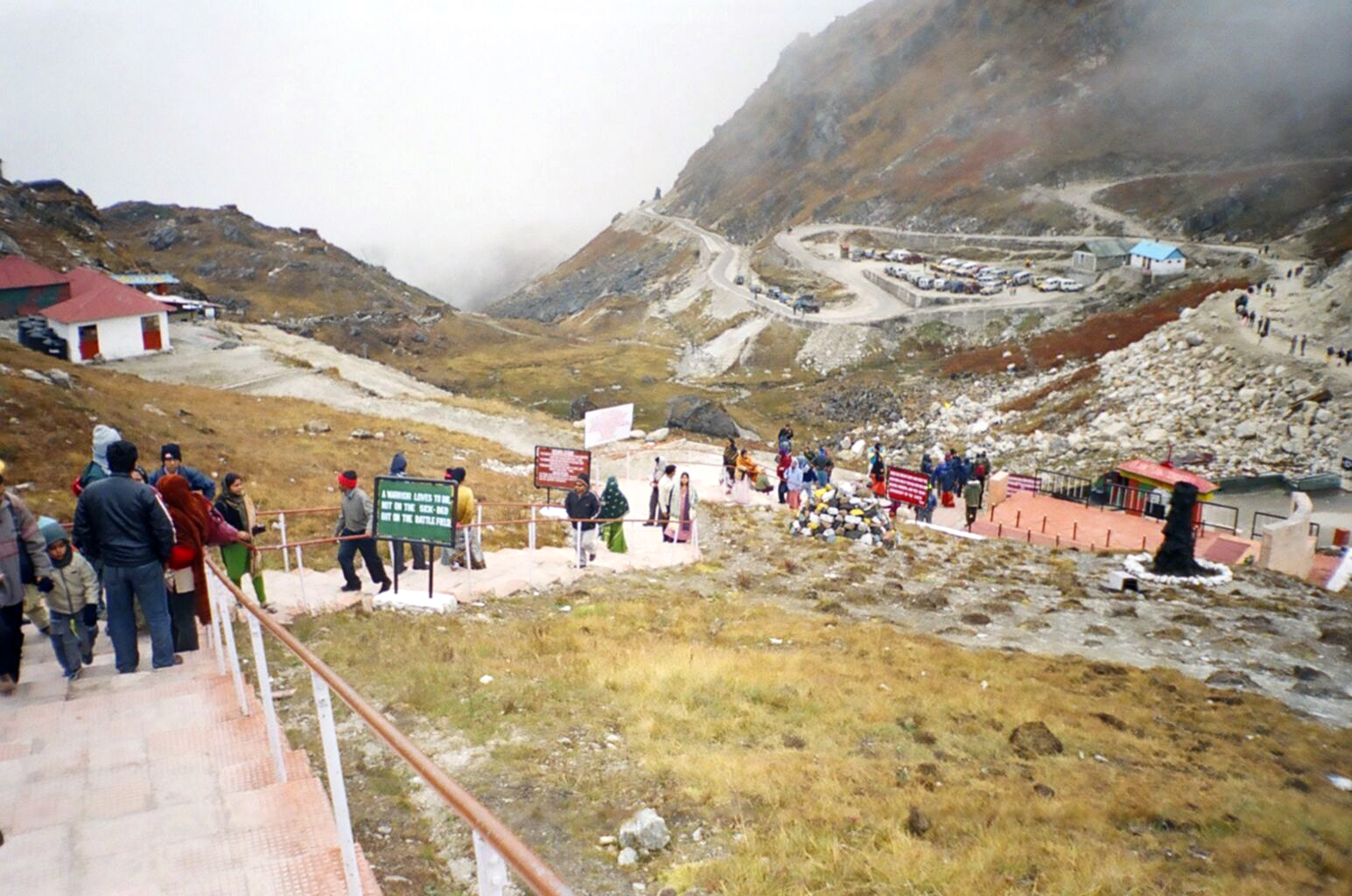
A visual from the stairs. The Natula memorial visible at right center.

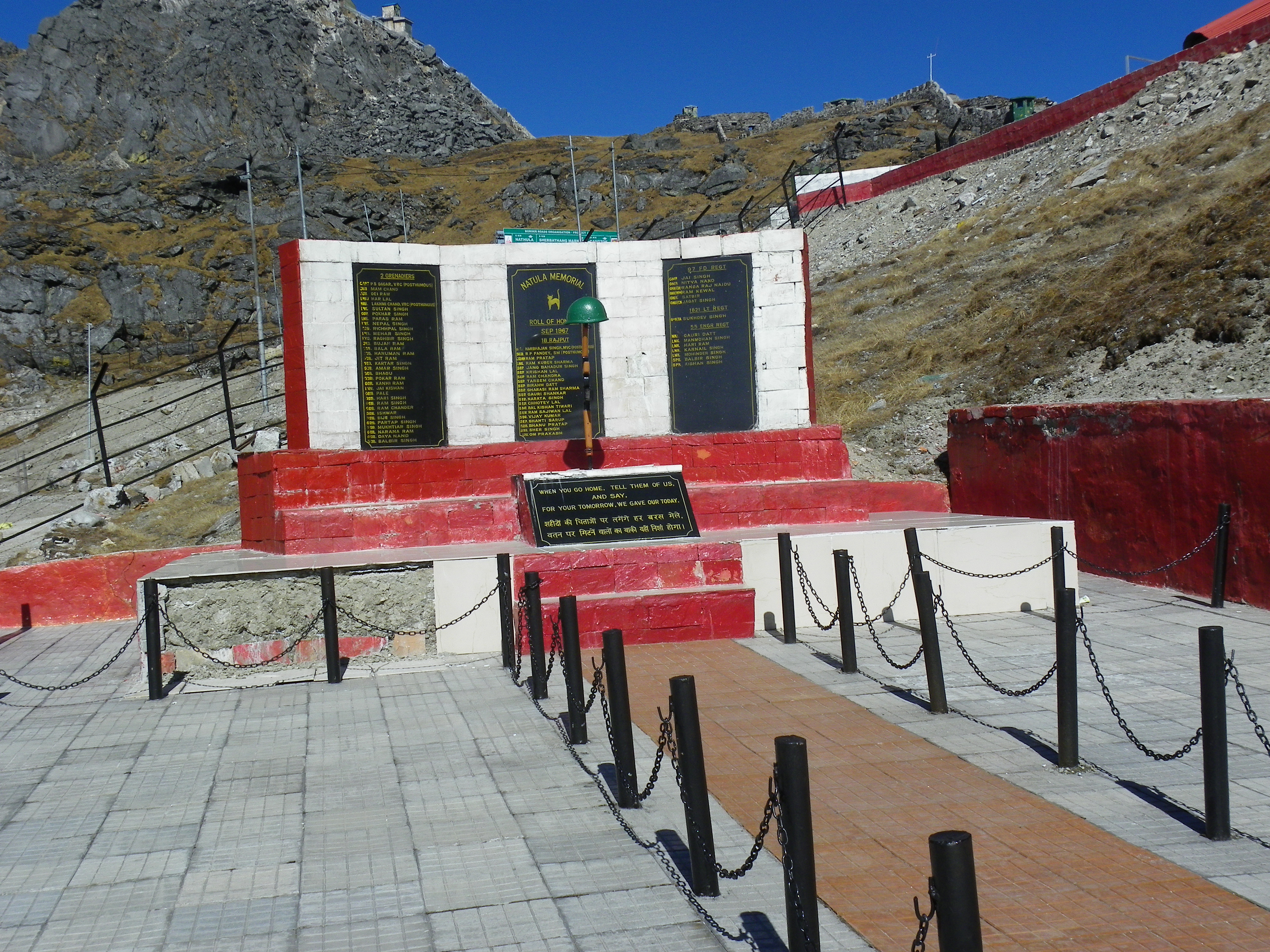
The Natula memorial.

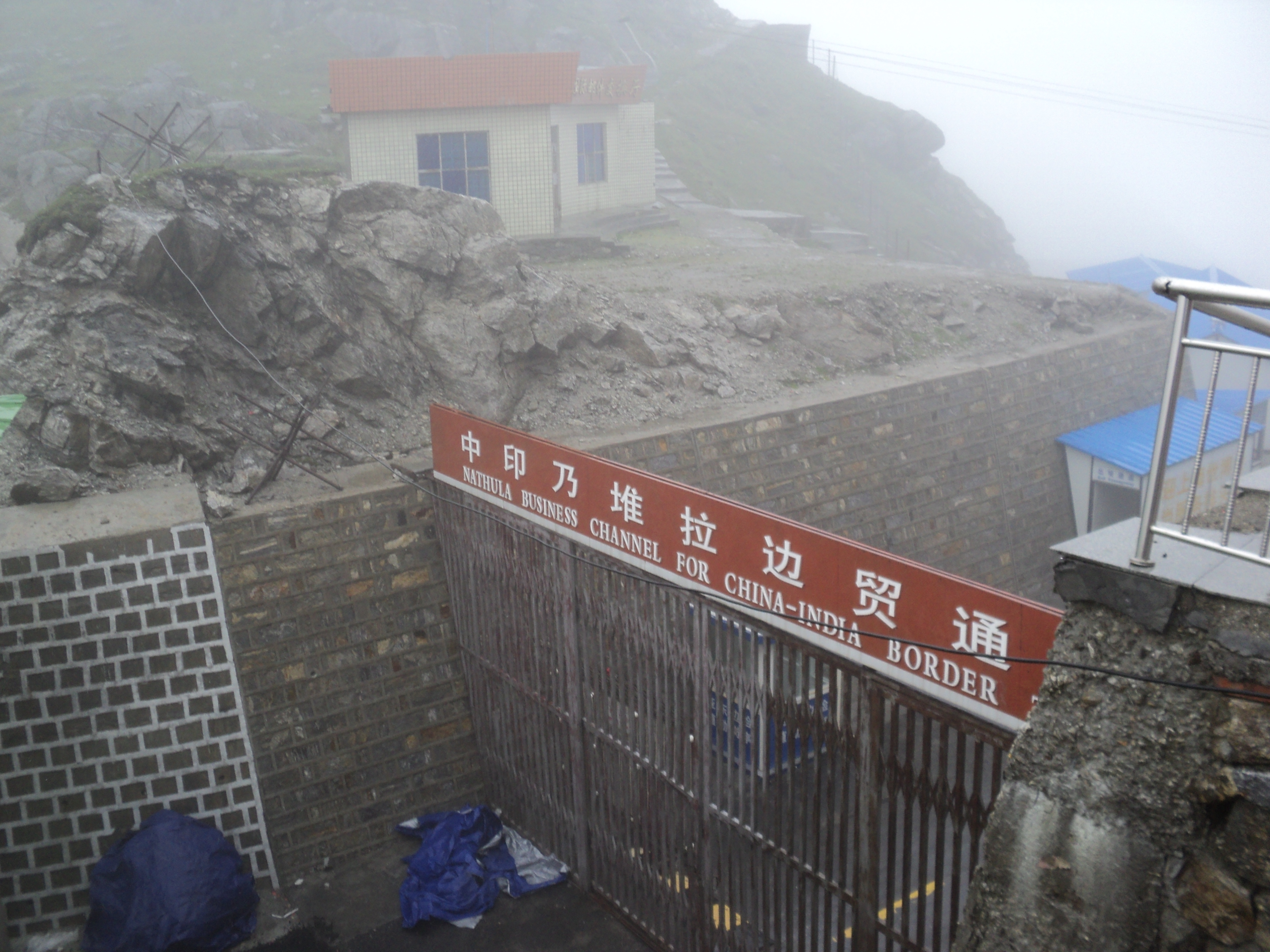
The main trade road connecting both sides.

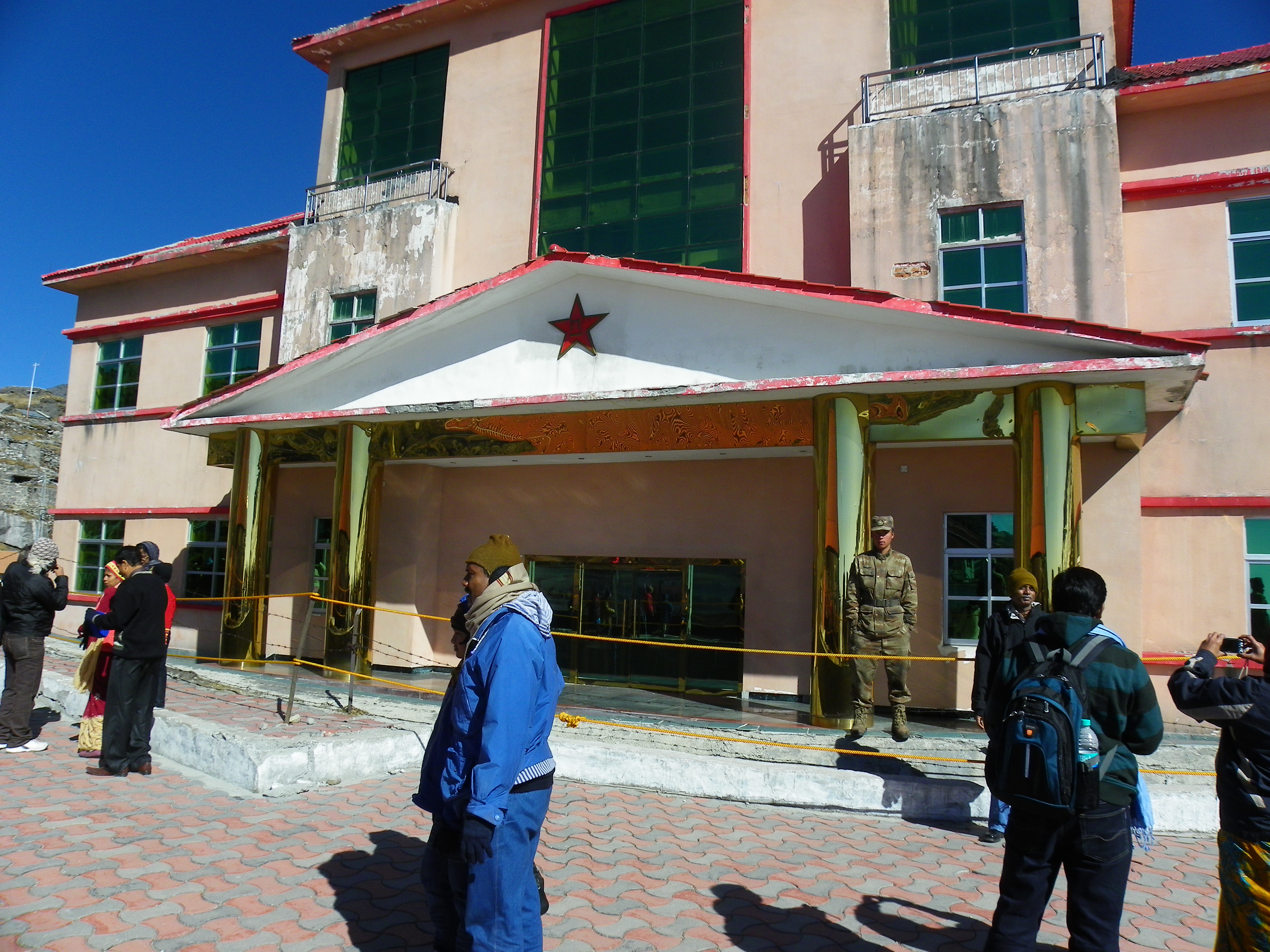
The Chinese army office taken from the Indian Army office at the pass.

The pass provides an alternative pilgrimage route to Mount Kailash and Lake Manasarovar. The route through Nathu La, as compared to the original route through Lipulekh pass, requires pilgrims to make a much easier and shorter trek. However, with new road construction by the Border Roads Organisation, the Lipulekh pass route has also been made easier. Baba Harbhajan Singh memorial and shrine is also part of the Nathu La tourist circuit.

=== Mail exchange ===
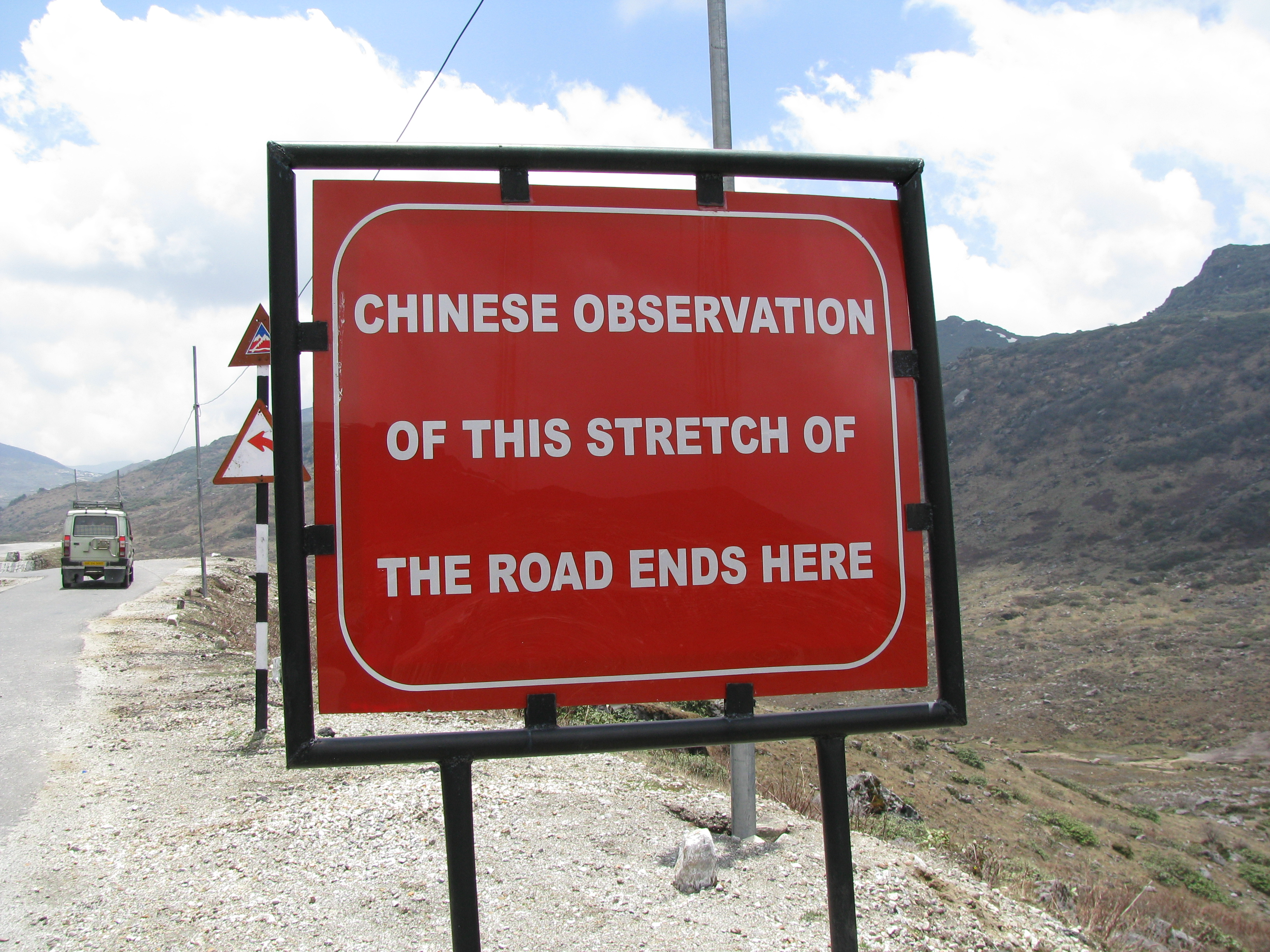
Notice seen driving back from Nathu La.

Twice a week at 8:30 am in an exchanging lasting only 3 minutes, on Thursdays and Sundays, the international surface mail between India and China is exchanged by postmen of the respective countries at Nathu La's Sherathang border post. While the volume of mail is declining due the advent of email and internet, it is mostly from the Tibetan Refugees in India or among the locals with relatives on both sides of the border. This arrangement reduces the mail delivery time for the people of border areas to few days which would otherwise takes weeks to be delivered via the circuitous logistics chain. In this short exchange, no words is spoken as both sides do not understand each other's language, mail is exchanged, an acknowledgement letter is signed, sometimes empty mail bags are exchanged due to dwindling mail volume. This system, since the times of chogyals, continues uninterrupted even during the India-China disputes at 14,000 altitude where temperature drops to −20 °C (−4 °F). An agreement between China and India in 1992 gave official recognition to the process.

=== Transport ===
National Highway (NH) 310 Gangtok–Nathu La road alignment in red.

The Gangtok–Nathu La road was first made motorable in 1958. At the time it only existed to Sherathang after which the journey was on foot. China had not developed the road during those years.

The stretch has several sinking zones and parts are prone to landslides. The flow of vehicles is regulated and road maintenance is supported by the Border Roads Organisation, a wing of the Indian Army. The road has an average rise of 165 feet (50 m) per km over a stretch of 52 kilometres (32 mi). Around 2006, plans were made to widen the road. Double-laning commenced in 2008. Also known as the JN Marg, and later known as National Highway (NH) 310, an alternative axis was constructed in 2020. 2006 also marked the inauguration of a railroad from Beijing to Lhasa via the Qinghai–Tibet line. In 2011, the railroad began to be extended to Shigatse. There has been talk of extending the Qinghai-Tibet Railway to Yadong. China National Highway 318 (Shanghai to Zhangmu) is connected to Chumbi Valley from Shigatse via provincial road S204, about 30 km from Nathu La and Jelep La.

India has been planning an extension of rail services from Sevoke in West Bengal's Darjeeling district to Sikkim's capital Gangtok, 38 miles (61 km) from Nathu La. The intention to construct this sometime in the future was confirmed in March, 2023, by the Minister of Railways Ashwini Vaishnaw. However, so far, the actual broad gauge line construction has been limited to a 45 km extension from Sevoke to Rangpo, due for completion in 2022.
