= Sanglaphu =

Mountain peak

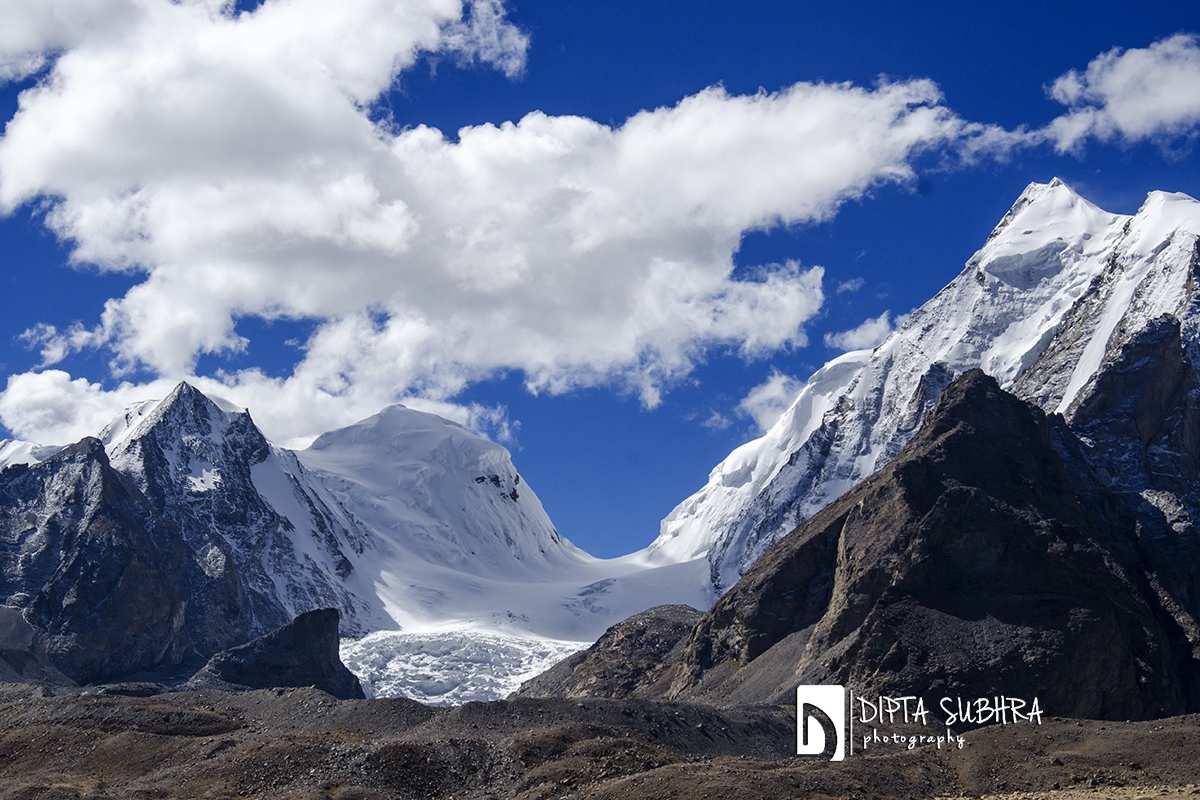
- View from the north over the Gurudongmar glacier to the Sanglaphu, seen in the half left of the image (October 2014)

Highest point
- Elevation: 6,224 m (20,420 ft)
- Coordinates: 27°58′38.19″N 88°43′00.83″E

Geography
- Location within Sikkim Location within India
- Location: Sikkim, India

Climbing
- First ascent: 1991, by an Indian team from Sonam Gyatso Mountaineering Institute

Sanglaphu is a mountain peak location at 6,224 m (20,420 ft) in northeast of Sikkim, India.

== Location ==
The mountain is part of the Dongkya range. On its western flank, the water flows from Gurudongmar Glacier to Gurudongmar Lake, which lies in the headwaters of the Lachen Chu, which in turn feeds the Teesta River. On the opposite side of the glacier is the main summit of Gurudongmar 6,715 m (22,031 ft). The southern flank of the Sanglaphu is drained from the Lachung Chu. There is also the mountain lake Sanglaphu Cho at an altitude of 5,080 m (16,670 ft).

== Climbing history ==
Sanglaphu was first climbed on October 1, 1991, by mountaineers from Sonam Gyatso Mountaineering Institute, Gangtok. The team consisted of Kalden, Beniwal, Tamang, Dawa, Passang, Nima Sangay, Choudhary, Rawat, Mahendra Pal, Ganesh and Pushpa.
