= Tso Lhamo Lake =

Lake in Sikkim, India

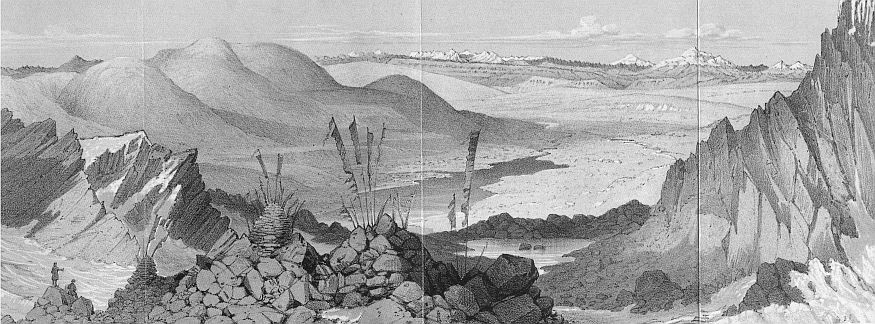
- Tibet and Tso Lhamo Lake from the summit of the Dongkha La, looking northwest

- Location in Sikkim Tso Lhamo Lake (India)
- Location: North Sikkim, Sikkim, India
- Coordinates: 28.0091°N 88.7553°E
- Primary inflows: Glacial
- Basin countries: India
- Designation: Restricted area
- Max. depth: 5.5 m (18 ft)
- Surface elevation: 5,100 m (16,700 ft)

Tso Lhamo lake is one of the highest lakes in the world, located at an elevation of 5,100 m (16,700 ft). It is situated in the Mangan district of Sikkim, India, about 4 km (2.5 mi) southwest of the international border with China. It is fed by waters from Zemu glacier, Kangtse glacier or Pauhunri glacier, and is the source of the Teesta River.

Joseph Dalton Hooker referred to the lake as Cholamoo lake. Its name is also spelled Chho Lhamo and Cholamu lake.

== Geography ==
Tso Lhamo Lake is a glacial, fresh-water lake located northeast of the Kangchenjunga range in a high plateau area connected with the Tibetan Plateau.

The Gurudongmar Lake lies some 5 km (3.1 mi) to the west.

== See also ==
- Tilicho lake
- Lake Tsongmo
- Khecheopalri Lake
