= Dongkha La =

Mountain pass in the Himalaya

Dongkha la
- Location within Sikkim Location within India
- Elevation: 18,156.2 ft (5,534.0 m)

Location
- Location: Sikkim, India
- Range: Himalaya
- Coordinates: 27°59′15″N 88°46′02″E

The Dongkha la or Donkia Pass (Chinese: 东卡拉山口) (el. 18,156.2 ft or 5,534.0 m) is a high mountain pass in the Himalaya connecting Sikkim in India with Tibet.

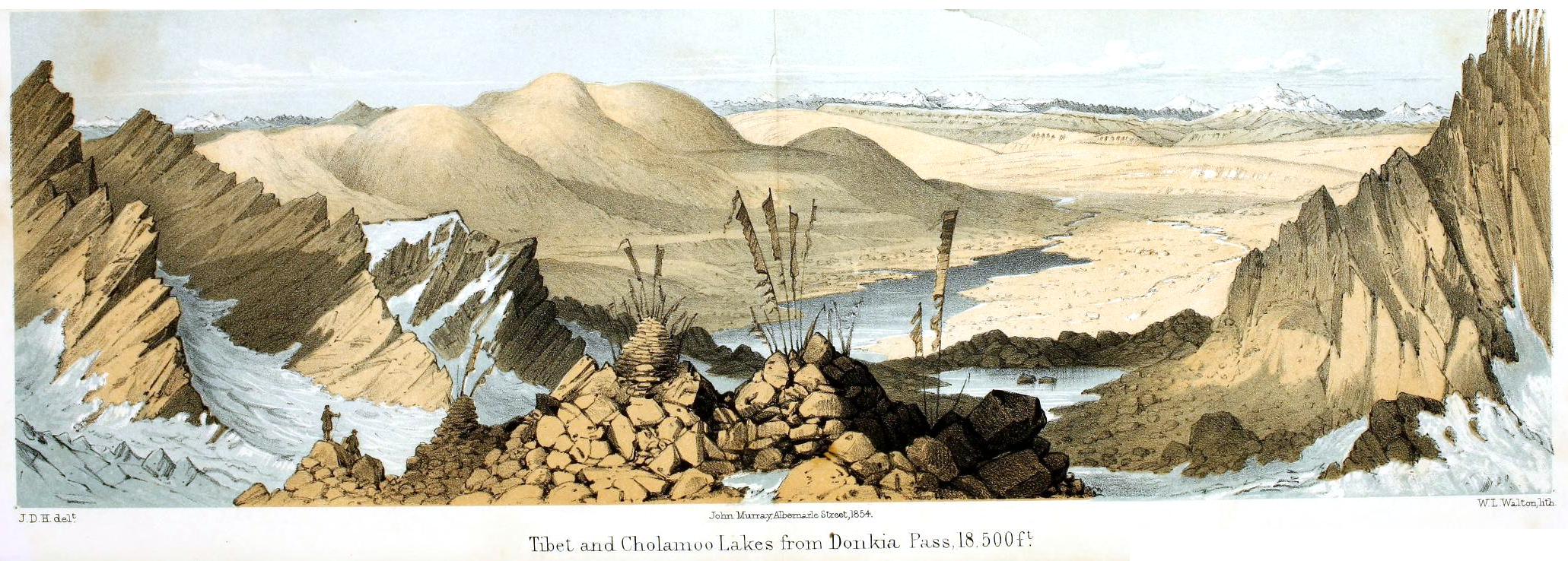
Painting by J D Hooker (1854)

Located in North Sikkim, the pass offers a view of the Tibetan Plateau. The nearby Tso Lhamo Lake 6.5 km (4.0 mi) is long and 2.5 km (1.6 mi) wide, and is the source of the Teesta River. Gurudongmar Lake, some 5 kilometres (3.1 mi) to west-northwest, also feeds the Teesta.

The first observer to record the pass in western literature was botanist Joseph Dalton Hooker, who crossed the pass on 7 September 1849.

Dongkha La
- Traditional Chinese: 東卡拉山口
- Simplified Chinese: 东卡拉山口
Transcriptions
Standard Mandarin
- Hanyu Pinyin: dònggālā shānkǒu
