= Gurudongmar Lake =

Lake in Sikkim, India

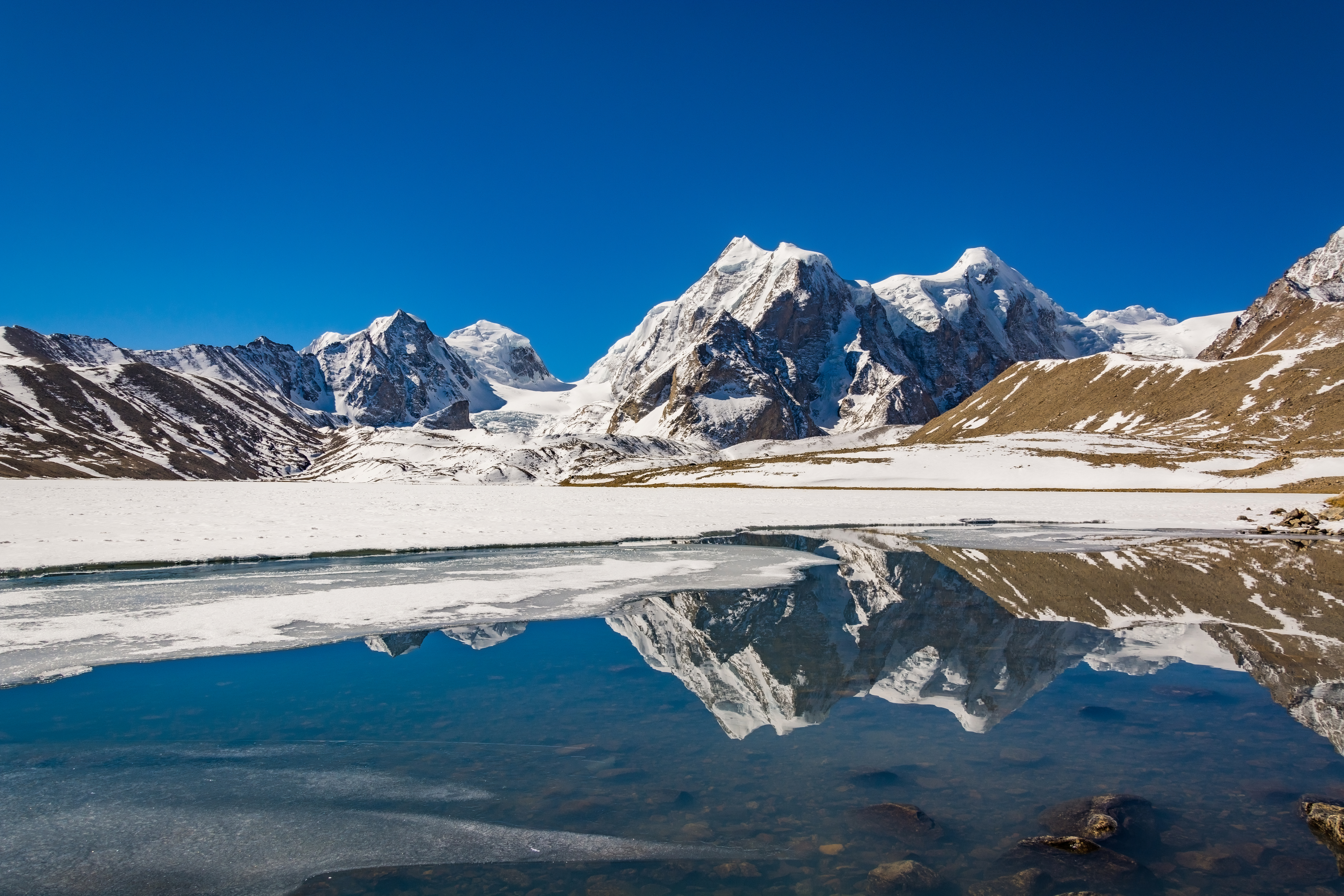
- Partially frozen Gurudongmar Lake

- Location within Sikkim Location within India
- Location: Mangan district, Sikkim, India
- Coordinates: 28.02°N 88.71°E
- Basin countries: Sikkim, India
- Max. length: Gurudongmar Lakeʍ
- Surface area: 118 ha (290 acres)
- Shore length^{1}: 5.34 km (3.32 mi)
- Surface elevation: 16,909 ft (5,154 m)
- Settlements: Mangan, Lachen
- ^{1} Shore length is not a well-defined measure.

Gurudongmar Lake is one of the highest lakes in the world and in India, at an elevation of 5,430 m (17,800 ft) according to the Government of Sikkim. (Note: Terrain maps indicate an elevation under 5,150 metres (16,900 ft).) It is located in the Great Himalayas in the Mangan district in Indian state of Sikkim, and considered sacred by Buddhists. The lake is named after Padmasambhava, who visited it in the 8th century.

== Geography ==
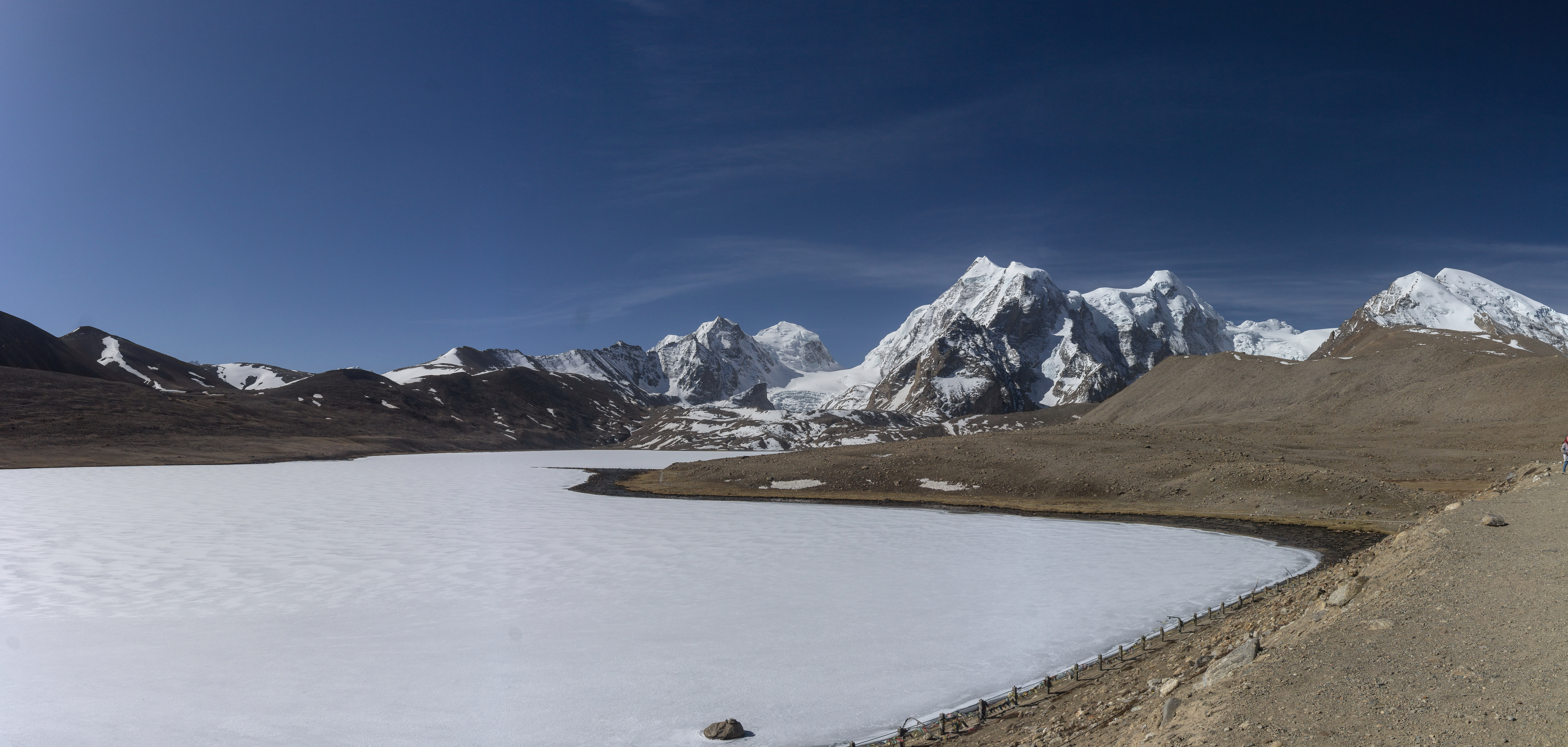
Fully frozen Gurudongmar lake, with Khangchengyao (extreme right), Gurudongmar West, Gurudongmar, and Sanglaphu peaks in the background

The high-elevation lake is located in the Mangan district, 190 km (120 mi) from Gangtok, and about 5 km (3.1 mi) south of the Chinese border. The lake can be reached by the 100-kilometre-long (62 mi) National Highway 310C (NH310C) from Chungthang via Lachen and Thangu Valley. The road from Thangu to Gurudongmar passes through rugged terrain with moraines and high alpine pastures covered with many rhododendron trees.

== Features ==
The lake is fed by the Gurudongmar glacier and is a moraine-dammed lake. It is located to north of the Khangchengyao range, in a high plateau area connected with the Tibetan Plateau. It provides one of the source streams, which joins the Tso Lhamo Lake and then form the source of the Teesta River. The lake remains completely frozen in the winter months from November to mid May.

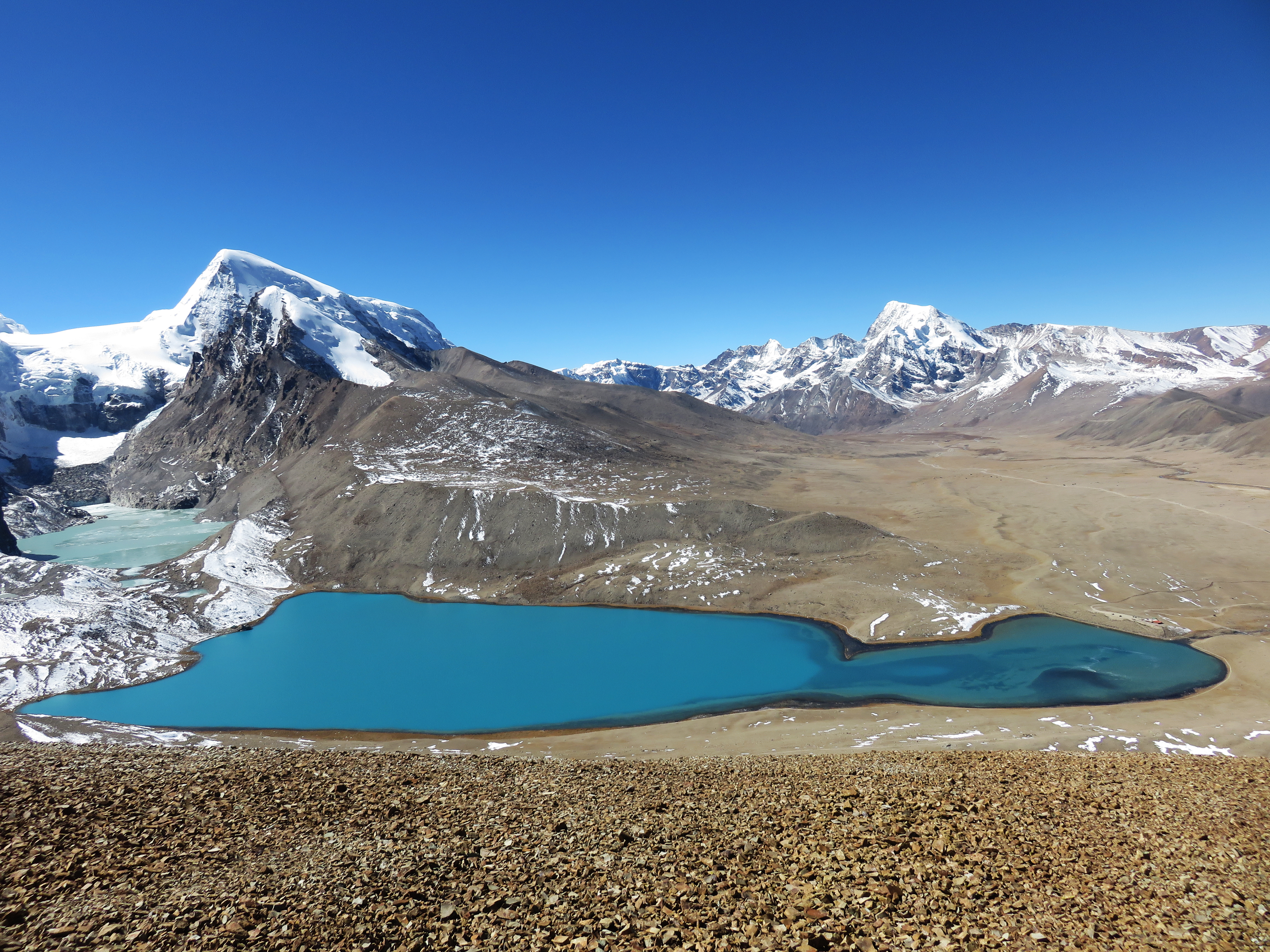
Panoramic view of the entire lake, with one of its two headwater lakes visible at the left, below Khangchengyao; Chomo Yummo peak visible in the distance on the right

The lake has an area of 118 hectares (290 acres) and its peripheral length is 5.34 kilometres (3.32 mi). The area surrounding the lake, also known as Gurudongmar, is inhabited by yaks, blue sheep, and other wildlife of high elevation.

== In folklore ==
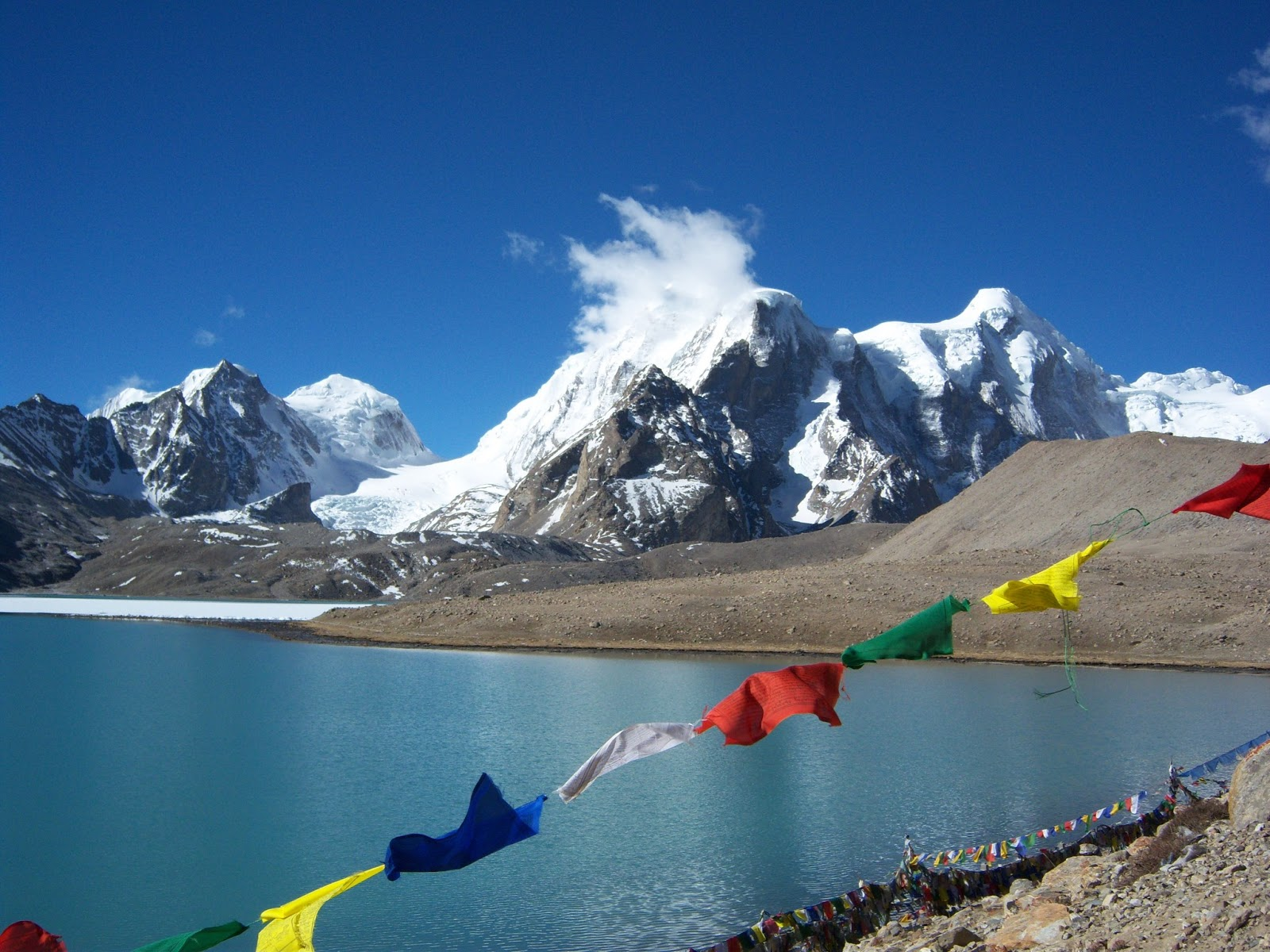
Buddhist prayer flags at Gurudongmar Lake

=== In Buddhism ===
According to local Buddhist beliefs, Padmasambhava, on his way back from Tibet, visited the Dorje Nyima lake, which remained frozen for most of the year. The locals called upon him to help them. After touching a small section of the lake, it never froze again, solving the water problem for the people. The lake became holy and an important place for Buddhist pilgrimage, ensuring the lake's continued existence.

== Dispute ==
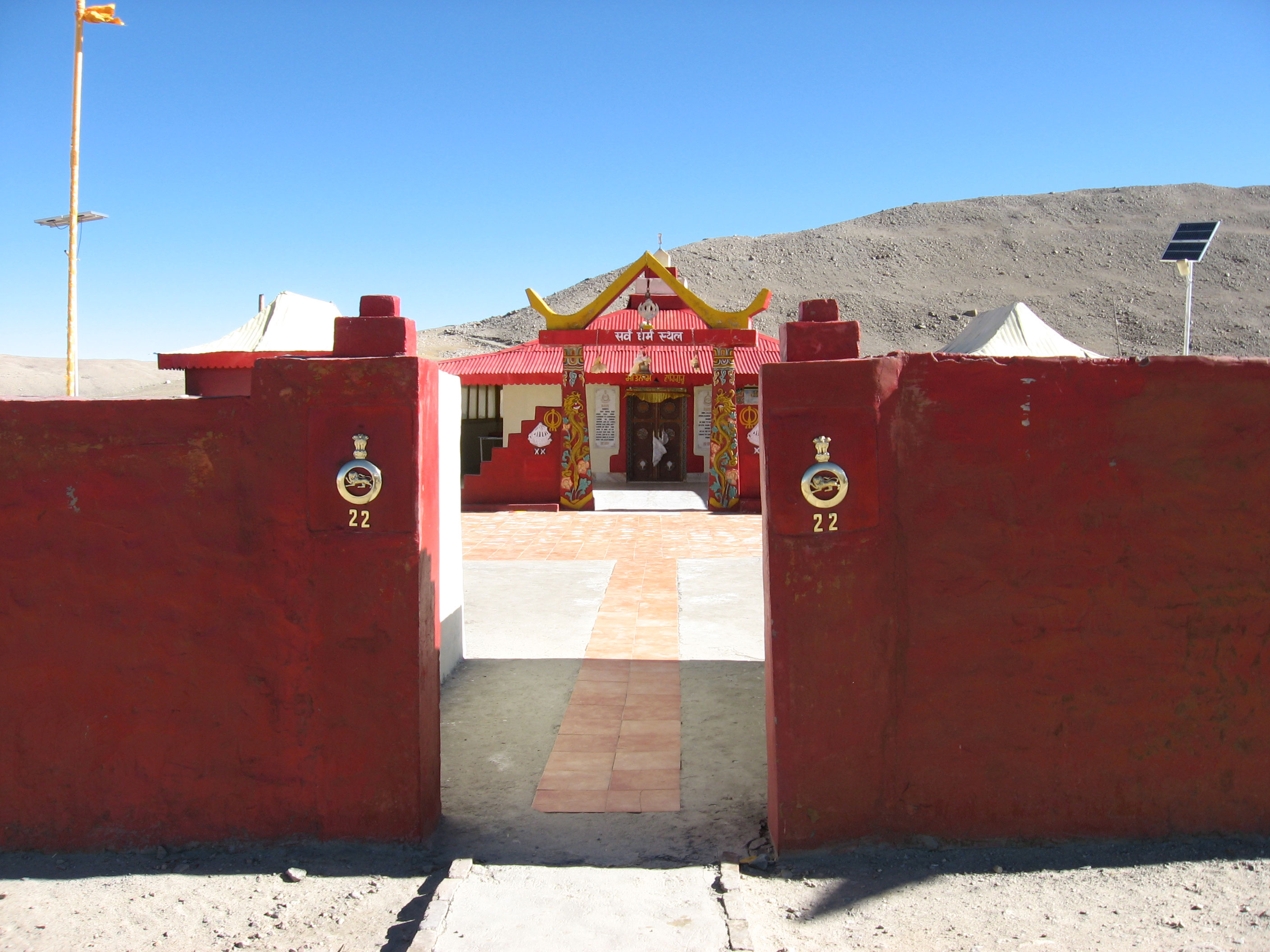
Gurudwara constructed by Sikh soldiers near the lake

A dispute arose when on the bank of the lake an Indian Army regiment of Sikhs—located at the border with China—considering the lake as the place visited by Guru Nanak, the founder of Sikhism, constructed a Gurudwara in 1997–1998. This created anger among the Sikkimese people of the area, who considered the Gurudwara an illegal construction, because their ancient sacred lake had been sanctified by the visit of their Guru Padmasambhava. The government of Sikkim then constituted a high level committee to examine the issue and submit a report. Documents furnished to the committee by the Namgyal Institute of Tibetology, Gangtok, agreed with the claim of the local people that it was without a doubt a Buddhist religious place. This was accepted by the committee. The building constructed by the Sikh regiment was then handed over by the Army to the Lachen Monastery on 6 July 2001, in the presence of the Sub Divisional Magistrate, Chungthang, North Sikkim. The monastery placed a lama as a watchman at the lake, entrusted with the task of maintaining it.

== See also ==
- Tourism in Northeast India
- Tilicho lake
- Lake Tsongmo
- Khecheopalri Lake
- Sanglaphu
