= Thangu Valley =

Village in Sikkim, India

- village
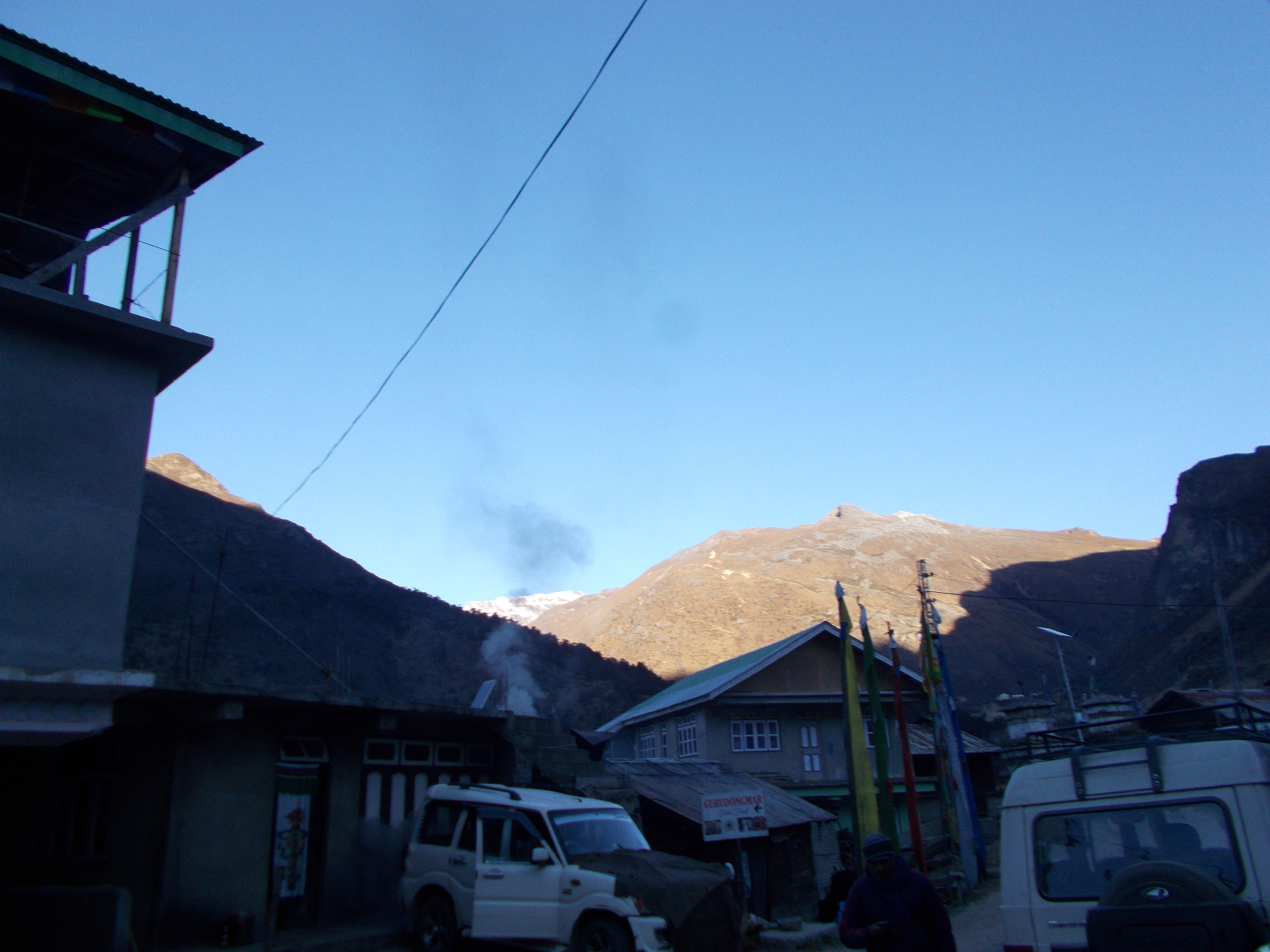

- Location in Sikkim, India Thangu Valley (India)
- Coordinates: 27.895°N 88.537°E
- Country: India
- State: Sikkim
- District: Mangan District
- Elevation: 3,900 m (12,800 ft)
- Time zone: UTC+5:30 (IST)
- Vehicle registration: SK

Thangu Valley or Thangu-Chopta Valley is a town located in Mangan District in Sikkim, India. The population is at an estimated 1,000 residents.

== Location ==
Thangu valley is situated in the northern part of the Sikkim province, roughly 30 kilometers (18.6 miles) North of the larger town of Lachen. It is a common stop for tourists traveling to Gurudongmar Lake
