= Gurudongmar (mountain) =

Mountain in India

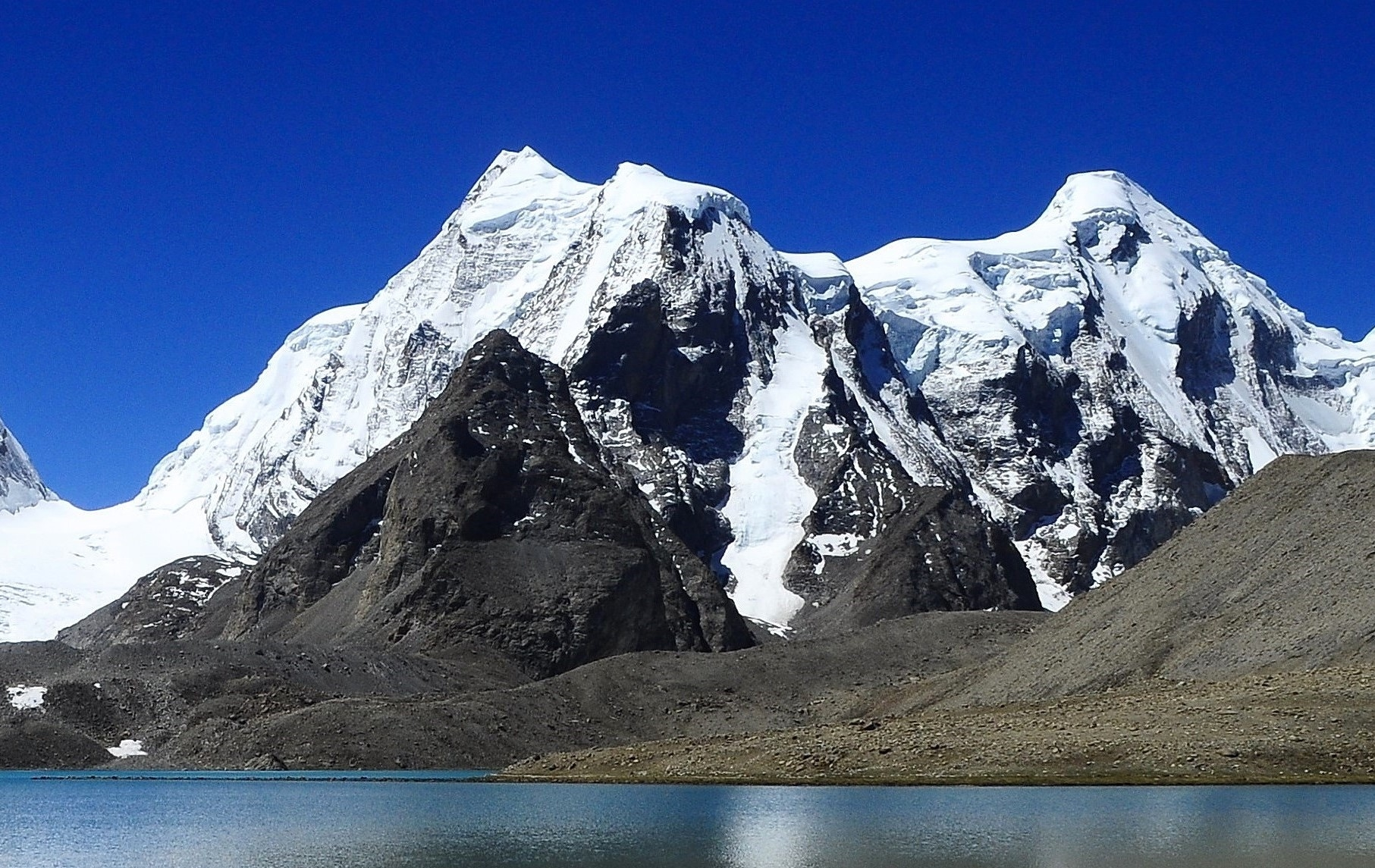
- North aspect Summit to left, west peak to right

Highest point
- Elevation: 6,715 m (22,031 ft)
- Prominence: 495 m (1,624 ft)
- Parent peak: Khangchengyao
- Isolation: 5.3 km (3.3 mi)
- Coordinates: 27°58′49″N 88°41′57″E

Geography
- Location within Sikkim Location within India
- Interactive map of Gurudongmar
- Location: Chungthang
- Country: India
- State: Sikkim
- District: Mangan
- Parent range: Himalayas; Dongkya Range

Climbing
- First ascent: 1936

Gurudongmar is a mountain in northern India.

== Description ==
Gurudongmar is a 6,715-metre (22,031-foot) glaciated double summit in the Himalayas. The lower peak, Gurudongmar West, rises to an elevation of 6,630 metres and is 1.6 km west of the main summit. The mountain is situated in the state of Sikkim, 70 kilometres (43 mi) north of the capital city of Gangtok. Precipitation runoff from this mountain's slopes drains north into the Teesta River drainage basin and south into the Lachung River drainage basin. Topographic relief is significant as the northeast slope rises 1,165 metres (3,822 ft) in one kilometre (0.62 mi). The first ascent of Gurudongmar was achieved in 1936 by Eric Shipton and Edwin Kempson via the west ridge. However, the possibility exists that they only climbed Gurudongmar West, having regarded the main summit as an entirely different mountain, which in that case would make the first ascent in 1991 by an Indian team composed of Lakpa, Nima, P. Lakpa, and Sepley from the Sonam Gyatso Institute in Gangtok. The mountain's name means the "incarnation of Guru Rimpoche" and the mountain is named in association with Gurudongmar Lake which is four kilometres (2.5 mi) to the north.

== Climate ==
Based on the Köppen climate classification, Gurudongmar is located in a tundra climate zone with cold, snowy winters, and cool summers. Weather systems are forced upwards by the Himalaya mountains (orographic lift), causing heavy precipitation in the form of rainfall and snowfall. July through September is the monsoon season. The months of April, May and June offer the most favorable weather for viewing or climbing this mountain.

== See also ==
- Geology of the Himalayas

== Gallery ==
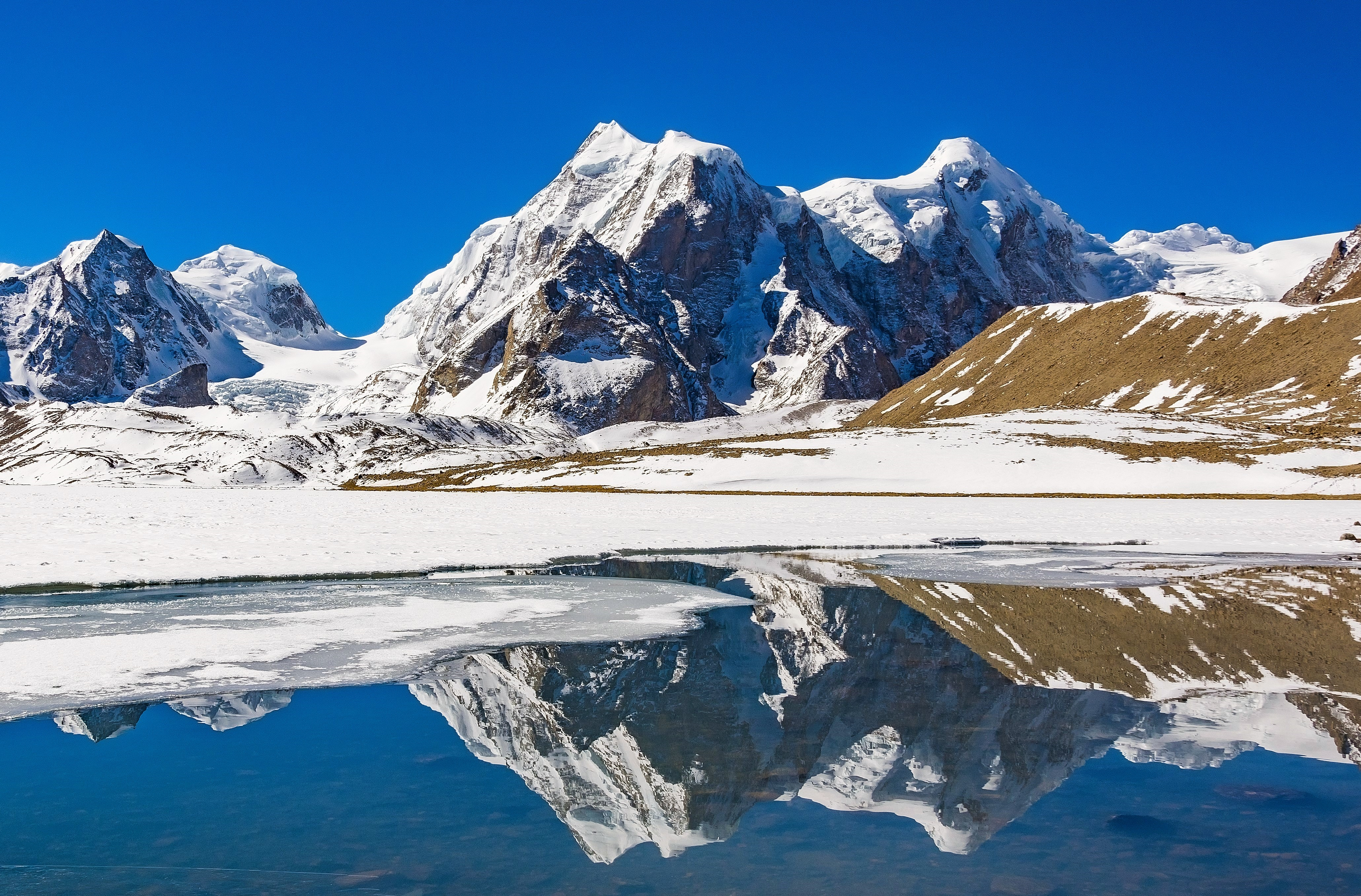
Gurudongmar reflected in Gurudongmar Lake

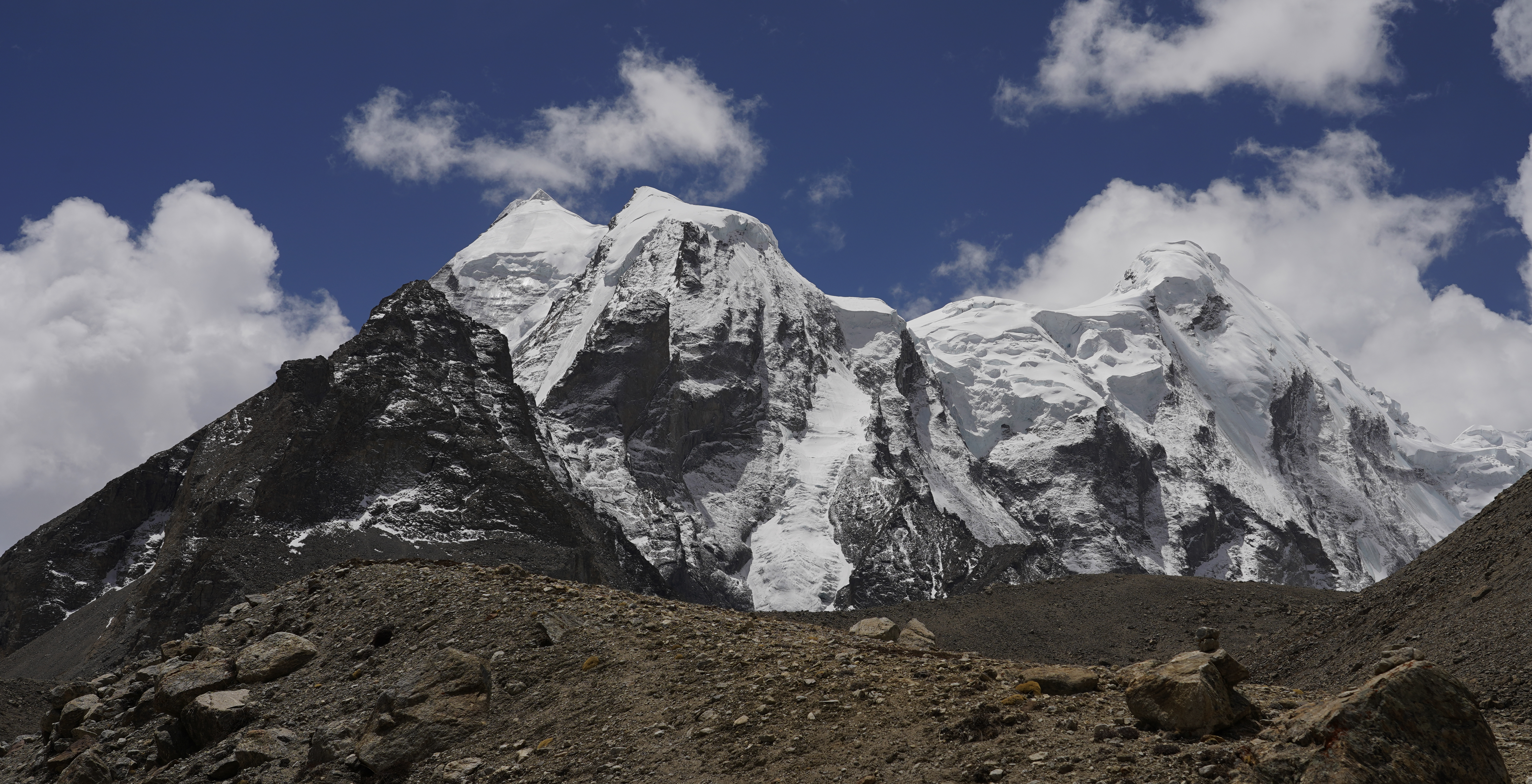
