= 1975 in Sikkim =

- Decades: 1950s; 1960s; 1970s; 1980s; 1990s
- See also: Other events of 1975; Timeline of Sikkimese history

The following lists events that happened during 1975 in Sikkim.

== Events ==
=== April ===
- 10 April - The legislature for Sikkim, located in the Himalayan Mountains, voted to abolish the monarchy and to make the nation one of the states of India.
- 14 April - Voters in Sikkim overwhelmingly approved abolishing that nation's monarchy and merging with neighboring India. The final result was 59,637 in favor and only 1,496 against.

=== May ===
- 16 May - Sikkim became the 22nd state of India and its 200,000 residents became citizens, as Indian President Fakhruddin Ali Ahmed signed an order ratifying an amendment to the nation's constitution. Sikkimese voters had overwhelmingly approved annexation on 14 April and India's Parliament had approved statehood the same month.
- 16 May - B. B. Lal was made the first governor of the new state of Sikkim. Till 15 May, he served as the Chief Executive of the Kingdom of Sikkim.
