= Khangchengyao =

Mountain peak

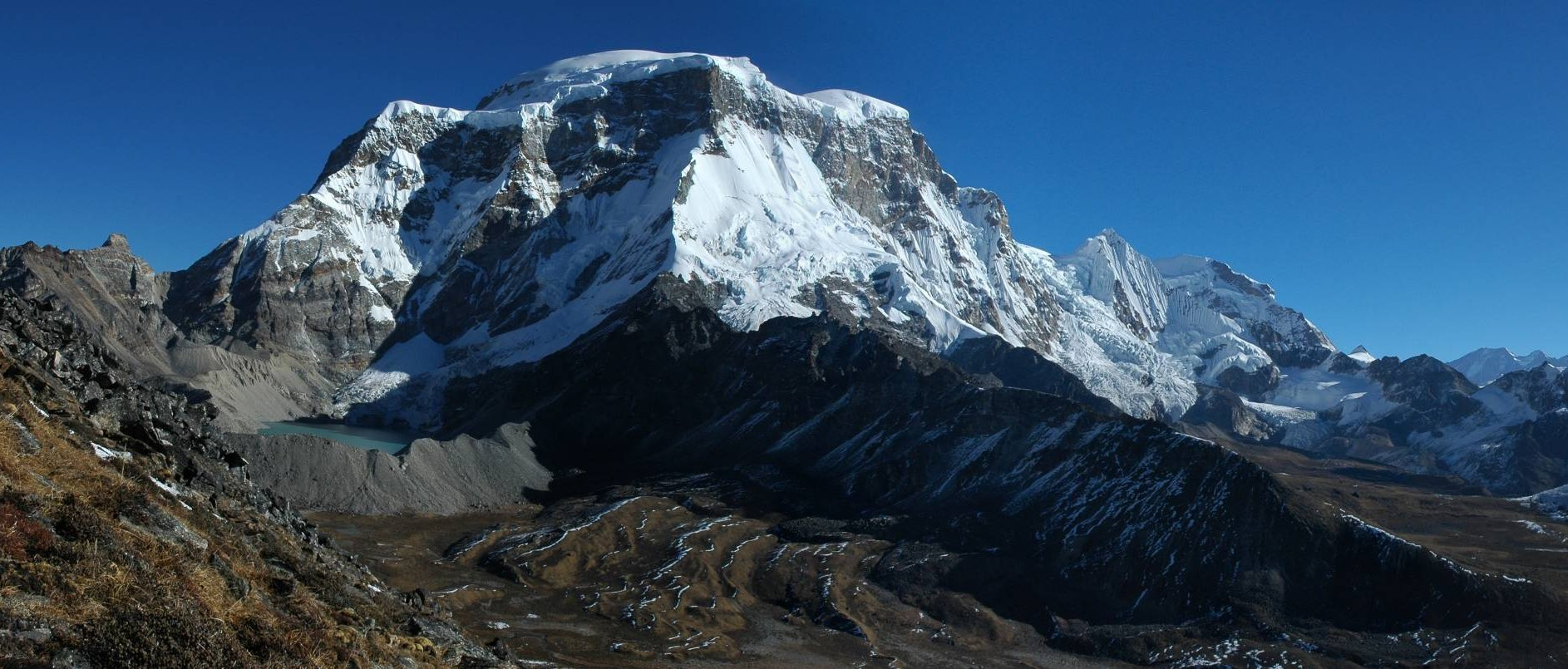
- Kangchengyao from south-west

Highest point
- Elevation: 6,913 m (22,680 ft)
- Prominence: 1,490 m (4,890 ft)
- Coordinates: 27°59′9″N 88°39′17″E

Geography
- Location within Sikkim Location within India
- Location: Sikkim

Climbing
- First ascent: 1912 - Alexander Mitchell Kellas and Sherpas

Khangchengyao is a mountain peak located at 6,913 m (22,680 ft) north-west of Yumesodong, North Sikkim in the Eastern Himalayas.

== Location ==
Khangchengyao is a revered peak among the locals. It is the 4th highest peak in Sikkim and 10th highest peak in India. As per folklore, Khangchengyao is known as the Male Deity.
