= Gipmochi =

Mountain in India/Bhutan

- Gyemochen
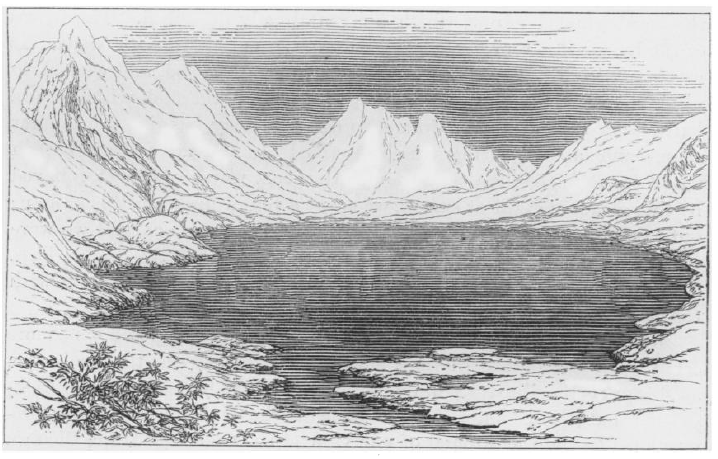
- Sketch of Bitang Tso with Gipmochi in the background (Sir Richard Temple, 1881)

Highest point
- Elevation: 14,523 ft (4,427 m)
- Coordinates: 27°16′26″N 88°54′00″E

Naming
- English translation: The Great Queen

Geography
- Countries: India and Bhutan
- States: Sikkim and Samtse
- Parent range: Eastern Himalayas

Gipmochi (Gyemo Chen or Gamochen, 'The Great Queen') is a mountain in the Lower Himalayas in south central Asia. Rising to a height of 14,523 feet (4,427 m), the mountain sits on the border between the northern Indian state of Sikkim and Bhutan. China claims Gipmochi as the China–India–Bhutan tri-junction point. Bhutan and India, however, claim that the tri-junction is 6.5 km to the north, at Batang La.

== Geography ==
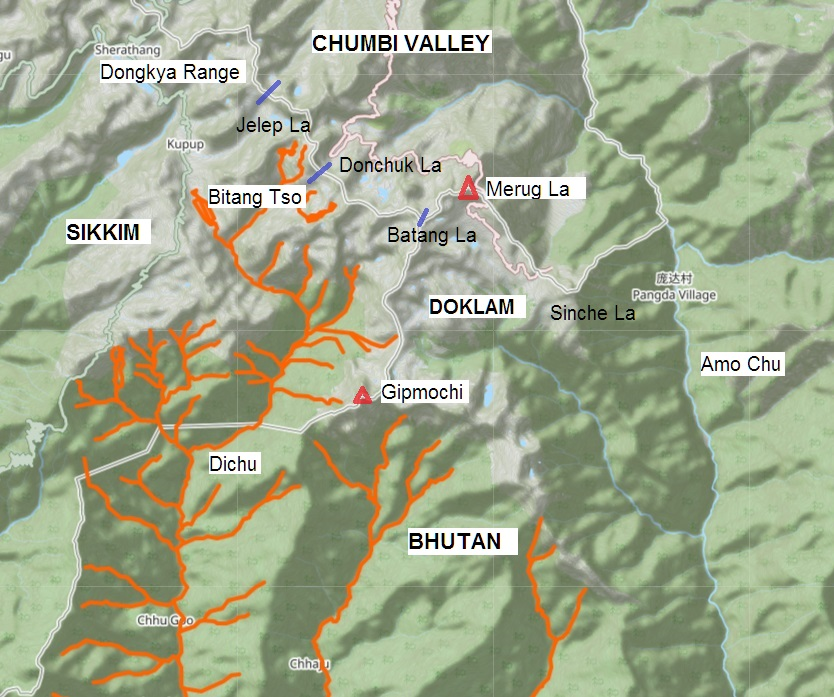
Map 1: Gipmochi, Doklam plateau and vicinity, shown along with the Dichu river basin in orange

Mount Gipmochi is a Himalayan peak rising to 14,523 feet (4,427 m), on the southwestern shoulder of the Doklam plateau. The plateau is at the intersection between India, Bhutan and Tibet, and is formed by the joining of two ridges, Dongkya Range in the north and Zompelri ridge (or Jampheri ridge) in the south, via a Doka La pass in the middle.

Technically Gipmochi is part of the Zompelri ridge, which is a curved semicircular formation on the southern side of the plateau. The Dongkya Range, on the northern side, forms the dividing line between Sikkim (part of India) and the Chumbi Valley (part of Tibet), with numerous passes such as Cho La, Nathu La and Jelep La. The Doklam plateau is to the east of all these passes. In the 19th century, the existence of the plateau was not recognised, and the Dongkya Range itself was thought to be curving south and dividing into a western and an eastern branch. In the modern view, the Dongkya Range is seen to continue beyond Sikkim to the east, passing through the Batang La, Merug La and Sinche La peaks and gradually descending down to the plains.

To the west of the Mount Gipmochi and the Doklam plateau lie the headwaters of the Dichu river (also called the Jaldhaka river). The Teesta river basin of Sikkim is further west, the dividing line being a moraine at Kupup, below the Jelep La pass. A lake called Bitang Tso (or Bidan Tso, also called the Kupup Lake), just to the east of Kupup, is traditionally regarded as the origin of the Dichu river. Dichu flows southeast towards the Mount Gipmochi and turns south, entering the Bhutanese territory. A tributary of Dichu called Asam Khola rises below Mount Gipmochi on its southern shoulder, and joins Dichu near the village of Khentong.

To the northeast of Gipmochi lies the basin of the Amo Chu river, which rises in the Chumbi Valley and flows into Bhutanese territory near Sinche La. A stream called Torsa Nala (or Doklam River) issues from the Doka La pass, flowing through the Doklam valley between the Zompelri and Dongkya ridges. It joins the Amo Chu river about 8 miles downstream.

== References during the British Raj ==
=== Initial survey ===
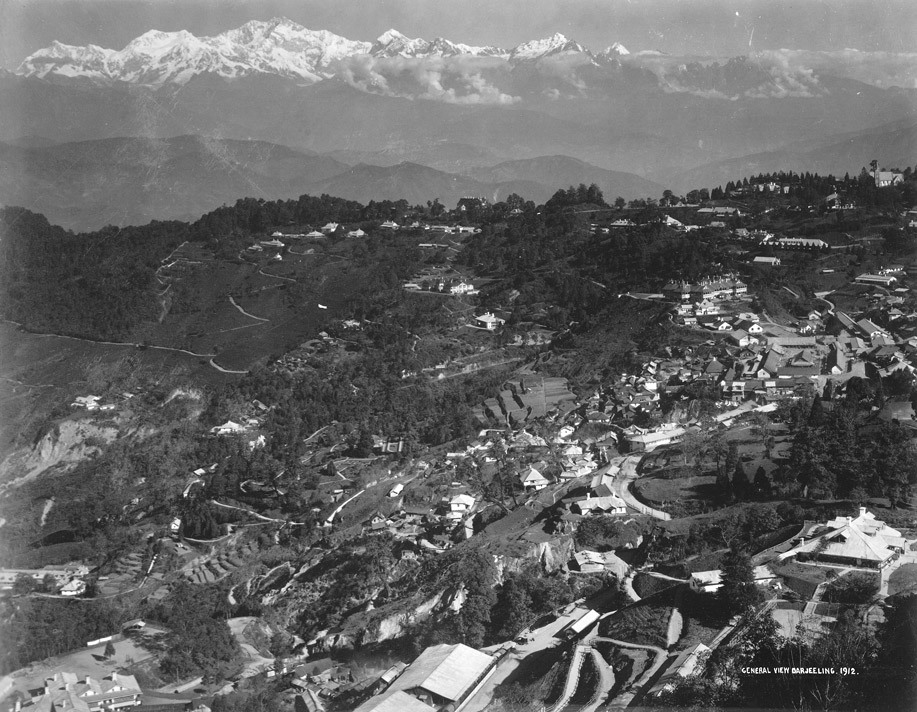
View of Himalayan peaks from Darjeeling (1885 photograph)

Mount Gipmochi received a prominent position in British geography of the region because it is one of the peaks visible from Darjeeling, which the British leased from the Chogyal of Sikkim in 1835 in return for an annual subsidy. They had free access to the tract around Darjeeling, but not to Sikkim proper. Numerous Himalayan peaks were however visible from Darjeeling. Surveyor Reginald Walker, who was in charge of the Eastern Himalayan survey in 1847, suggested that a suitable base line at sufficient distance can be used to measure the locations and heights of the high Himalayan peaks. After Walker's premature death, Andrew Scott Waugh, the Surveyor General of India, joined the Darjeeling survey party and fixed the positions and heights of all the visible peaks using trigonometric methods. Despite the great distance from which the peaks were measured, the positions were said to be correct to within quarter of a second in latitude and half a second in longitude.

=== Misplacement of Gipmochi ===
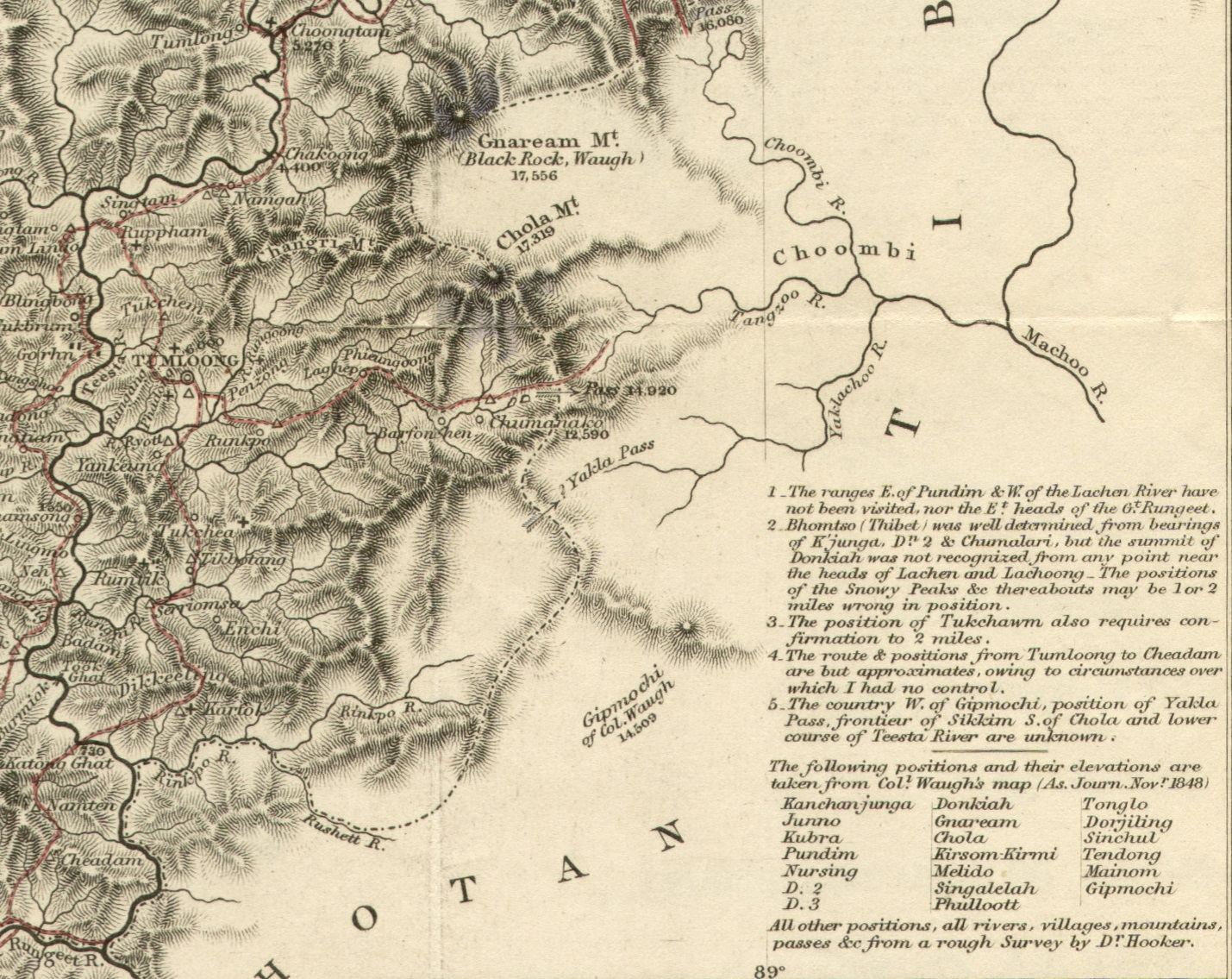
Map 2: Section of the Sikkim map showing southeast Sikkim by Joseph Dalton Hooker (1854); marked on the far right is "Gipmochi of Col. Waugh, 14,509".

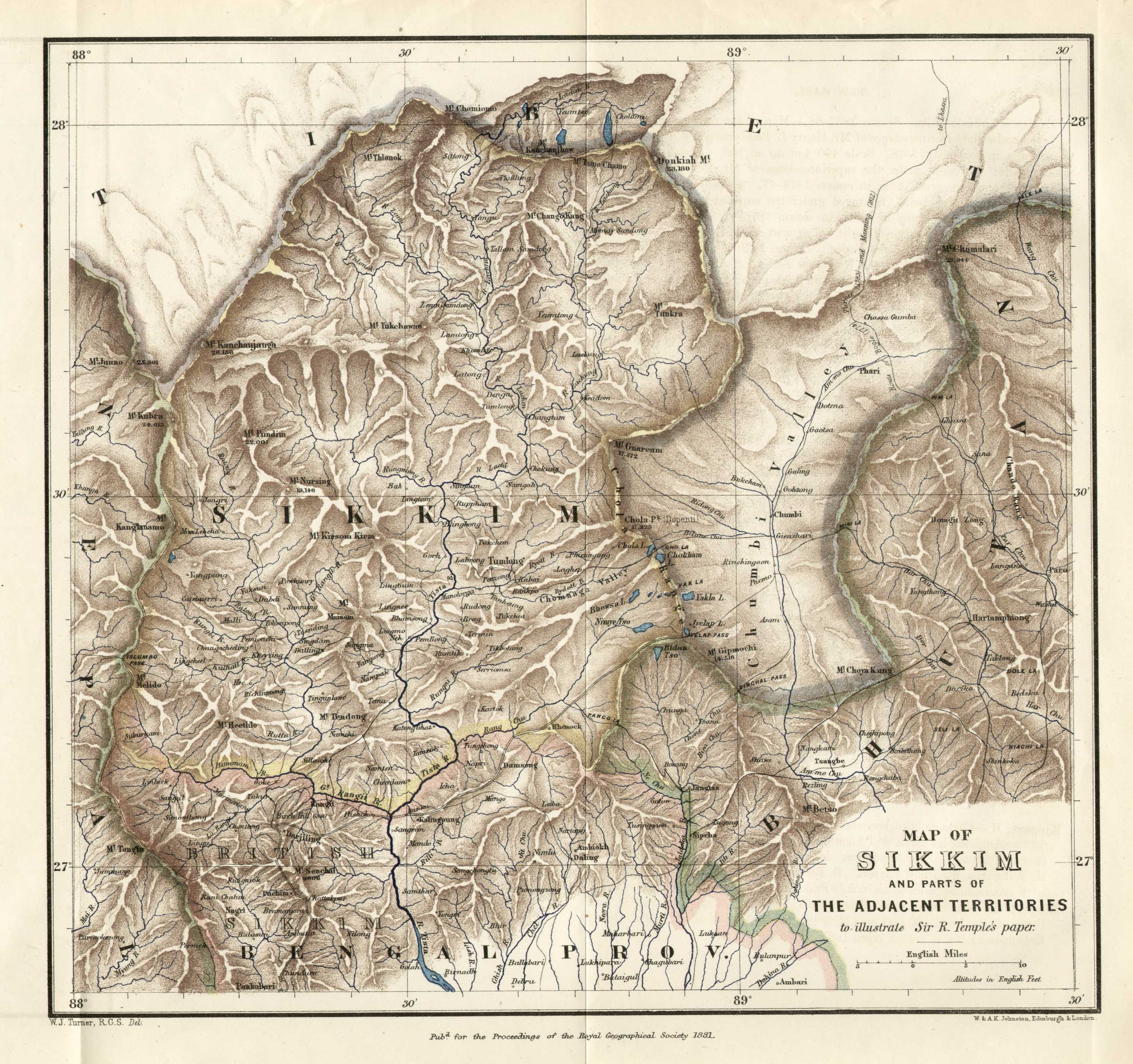
Map 3: Map accompanying Richard Temple's paper

Mount Gipmochi started appearing British maps around 1850 in the process of illustrating the travels of the noted British botanist Joseph Dalton Hooker. Hooker toured the then independent state of Sikkim to explore and collect samples of Himalayan plants. After touring the northern Sikkim (Lachung area), he returned to the then Sikkimese capital Tumlong, and along with Archibald Campbell, the superintendent of Darjeeling, attempted to go to Chumbi via the Cho La pass. The Sikkimese authorities prohibited them from entering Tibetan territory, and arrested them near the pass. Evidently, Mount Gipmochi was visible from their route, and Hooker remarked that the Dongkya Range gradually sinks into Bhutan near Gipmochi. Hooker placed Gipmochi directly on the Dongkya range, and attributed its position to Waugh. (Note: Hooker did not visit Mount Gipmochi, or anywhere southeast of Cho La. Hooker's exploration of the terrain was thus incomplete. The notes attached to the map state, "The country [west] of Gipmochi, [the] position of Yakla Pass, [the] frontier of Sikkim [south] of Chola and lower course of Teesta River are unknown." Despite these limitations, successive British maps of the region continued to show Mount Gipmochi as a peak on the Dongkya Range for the rest of the 19th century and the first two decades of the 20th century.) For several decades after this, the Mount Gipmochi continued to be shown on the Dongkya range despite other evidence to the contrary.

After the Hooker episode, the British signed the Treaty of Tumlong (1861) with Sikkim, bringing the state under their protectorate. All the previous restrictions on travel in Sikkim were removed. In 1864, the Anglo-Bhutan War was fought, at the end of which, through the Treaty of Sinchula, the British gained control over the present day Kalimpong district. This paved the way for a direct trade routue from Darjeeling to the Sikkim passes.

Richard Temple, the lieutenant-governor of the Bengal Presidency during 1874–1877, states that the British had begun to construct a cart road to the Jelep La pass for trade with Tibet. Temple explored the lake region of Sikkim and presented his findings at the Royal Geographical Society in 1881. One of his sketches showed Bitang Tso (or Kupup Lake) viewed from Kupup in Sikkim, with Mount Gipmochi in the background. His cartographer however continued to show Mount Gipmochi on the Dongkya range, in the tradition of Joseph Hooker, and placed the Bitang Tso to its south in Bhutanese territory. (Note: The map is titled "Map of Sikkim and Parts of Adjacent Territories to illustrate Sir R. Temple's paper" and signed "W. J. Turner, R.G.S. Det.") (Map 3) Temple himself invoked the authority of Hooker, stating, "In Sir Joseph Hooker's 'Himalayan Journals' the name Gipmochi is always applied to the mountain which terminates the Chola range [Dongkya range]."

=== 20th century ===
The Imperial Gazetteer of India states that the Dongkya range (or Chola range) that divides Sikkim from the Chumbi Valley bifurcates at Gipmochi into two great spurs, one running to the south-east and the other to the south-west. Between the two spurs lies the valley of the Dichul (Jaldhaka) river. The "western shoulder" of Gipmochi was said to contain the trijunction point of Sikkim, Bhutan and Tibet. The southwest spur mentioned in the Gazetteer forms part of the boundary between Sikkim and Bhutan. The southeast spur, called the Zompelri ridge (or Jampheri ridge), currently separates the Bhutanese districts of Haa (to the north) and Samtse (to the south).

The area bounded by Gipmochi and Batang La, extending about 5 km to the southeast, forms a plateau called Dolam or Doklam plateau. Some British travel maps from the 19th century (prior to official surveys) mark this plateau as "Gipmochi Pk" and show its alignment with the Sinchela pass (on the northern ridge of the plateau). Bhutan did not have a map of its lands till 1961.

== Chinese border claims ==
The Chinese claim of the trijunction point is based on the 1890 Anglo-Chinese Convention, Article I of which states:

The boundary of Sikkim and Tibet shall be the crest of the mountain range separating the waters flowing into the Sikkim Teesta and its affluents from the waters flowing into the Tibetan Mochu [Amo Chhu] and northwards into other rivers of Tibet. The line commences at Mount Gipmochi on the Bhutan frontier and follows the above-mentioned waterparting to the point where it meets Nipal territory.

The Article mentions Gipmochi as being on Bhutan border, but no other details regarding Bhutan were given. Bhutan was not a signatory to the convention. Further, Gipmochi is not the highest point on the Doklam plateau. Merug La, at 15,266 feet, and Sinchela, at 14,531 feet, are higher, making the Batang La–Merug La–Sinchela line the highest watershed in the region.

Maps of Sikkim produced by Survey of India in 1923, 1933 and 1937 show Gipmochi as the tri-junction point,

On 30 June 2017, the Chinese government released a previously published Chinese map depicting their territory extending south to Gipmochi.

However, a map from 1910 that shows the details of the Chumbi Valley and Bhutan gives Batang La as the tri-junction point. Indian sources state that the Survey of India map of 1956 and other maps since then by both Indian and Bhutanese sources have depicted the tri-junction near Batang La.

The 2017 border dispute between China and India likely stems from India's security concern of its Siliguri Corridor. A Chinese observation post on the mountain of Gipmochi would have a clear view of this vital corridor which is heavily fortified by Indian troops. Scholar Caroline Brassard states, "its strategic significance for the Indian military is obvious."

== Bibliography ==
- China Foreign Ministry (2 August 2017), The Facts and China's Position Concerning the Indian Border Troops' Crossing of the China-India Boundary in the Sikkim Sector into the Chinese Territory (2017-08-02) (PDF), Government of China
- Blandford, William T., Account of a visit to the eastern and northern frontiers of independent Sikkim, with notes on the zoology of the alpine and sub-alpine regions, Part I, pp. 367–420
- Hooker, Joseph Dalton (1854), Himalayan Journals – Notes of a Naturalist in Bengal, the Sikkim and Nepal Himalayas, the Khasia Mountains etc., vol. 1, London: John Murray – via archive.org
- Hooker, Joseph Dalton (1854), Himalayan Journals – Notes of a Naturalist in Bengal, the Sikkim and Nepal Himalayas, the Khasia Mountains etc., vol. 2, London: John Murray – via archive.org
- Huxley, Leonard, ed. (2011), Life and Letters of Sir Joseph Dalton Hooker O.M., G.C.S.I., vol. 1 (illustrated ed.), Cambridge University Press, ISBN 9781108031004
- Phillimore, R. H. (1968), Historical Records of the Survey of India, Volume 5: 1844 to 1861, The Surveyor General of India – via archive.org
- Temple, Richard (June 1881), "The Lake Region of Sikkim, on the Frontier of Tibet", Proceedings of the Royal Geographical Society and Monthly Record of Geography, 3 (6): 321–340, doi:10.2307/1800507, JSTOR 1800507
