= Chema, Tibet =

Chema བྱེ་མ
- Village
- 切玛村 Qiè mǎ cūn
- Location within Tibet Location within Asia
- Coordinates: 27.4445°N 88.922°E
- Country: China
- County: Yadong
- Postal code: 857616

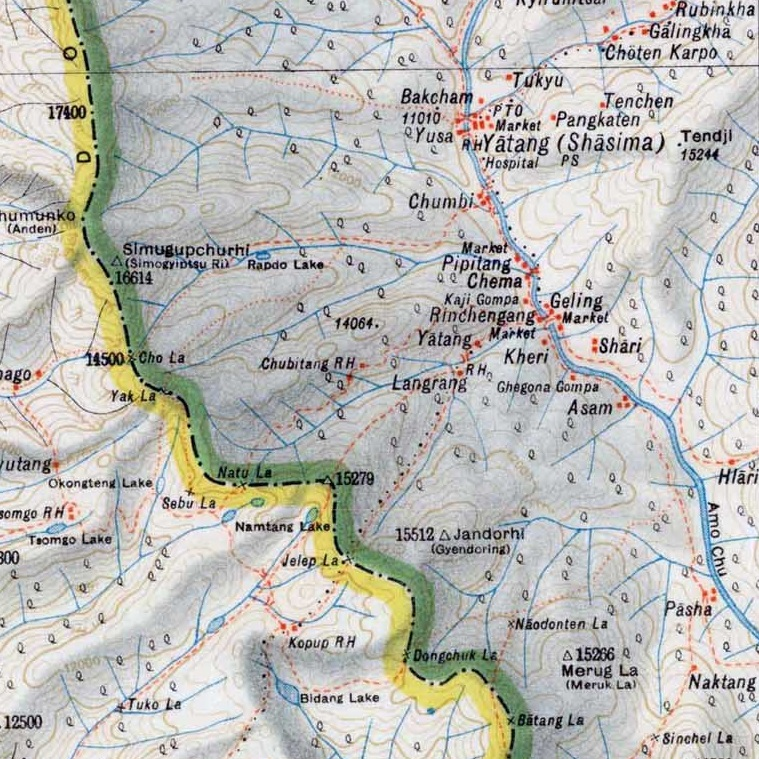
Map of lower Chumbi Valley (Survey of India, 1923): Chema is at the intersection of the Amo Chu Valley and the route from Nathu La.

Chema or Phema (Note: Alternative spellings: Pema, Phima, and Byema.) (Tibetan: བྱེ་མ, Wylie: bye ma, THL: jé ma, ZWPY: Qêma; Chinese: 切玛; pinyin: Qiè mǎ), is a village in the Chumbi Valley or Yadong County in the Tibet region of China. It is in the valley of Amo Chu where the route from Sikkim's Nathu La pass meets the Amo Chu valley. Chema is in the Xiayadong Township.

Across the river, on its eastern bank is the settlement of Pipitang (Note: Alternative spellings include Pipithang, Pibitang and Pimbithang.) (Chinese: 比比塘; pinyin: Bǐbǐ táng), which was described as a flourishing Chinese village in the 19th century. The village got emptied during the period of Tibet's independence (1912–1951). It is now repopulated.

== Geography ==
Chema and Pipitang are four miles to the south of Yatung (Shasima). The track from the Nathu La pass met the Amo Chu valley here, while the track from the Jelep La pass also joined here via Rinchengang. At the present time, the Yanai Road (Chinese: 亚乃路; pinyin: Yà nǎi lù) runs along this route to Nathu La.

In December 1903, British travel writer Laurence Waddell passed through Chema on his way to Lhasa and described it as follows:

A turn of the road, where a rocky spur dips sheer into the river, brings into view the pretty village of Byema, or "The Sandy," nestling on the sandy bank of a torrent from the rugged glen above. Its houses, with their finely carved and painted beams, are quite the most artistic in the whole valley.

His description continued with that of Pipitang:

Beyond this rocky point the gorge opens out again, and here we met a party of Chinese officials and soldiers, the latter in yellow blouses emblazoned on the back with three large Chinese letters in black, all hurrying down the valley. Just beyond this, we come upon the village of these people, a bit of real China-land transplanted thus far west. Entering the gateway under the Chinese tablet, bordered by ferocious leering dragons, you are in a truly Chinese street. On either side are the shops with their swinging signboards, on the window-sills are neat flower-pots with a marigold, daisy, or balsam in bloom, an unexpected luxury in mid-winter [...]. Inside the shops, behind the counters, are the pigtailed shopkeepers, placidly smoking their opium-pipes beside a teapot and saucer.

During the period 1894–1903, when a British Indian trade mart was opened at Old Yatung near Rinchengang, all the villages in the Chumbi valley were involved with the India–Tibet trade. Pipithang also had many Chinese officials and a yamen for handling passports and foreign visitors. Ekai Kawaguchi describes the elaborate procedures devised by the Tibetan and Chinese administration for traders visiting India. The senior Chinese official of the yamen was called Popon.

During 1904–1908, when the Chumbi Valley came under the administration of the British per the Convention of Lhasa, the Chinese continued to use Pipithang as their base, and attempted to act as if they were still controlling the Chumbi Valley. After 1911 Xinhai Revolution and the Dalai Lama's declaration of independence, all Chinese nationals were forced to leave Tibet. The village of Pipitang was deserted and said to have been in ruins in 1919. A British report in 1940 said that the all the houses except one were washed away in a flood.

== Bibliography ==
- Bhanja, K. C. (1944), Lure of the Himalaya, Darjeeling: Gilbert & Co – via archive.org
- Buchanan, Walter (June 1919), "A Recent Trip into the Chumbi Valley, Tibet", Geographical Journal, LIII (6) – via archive.org
- Easton, John (1928), An Unfrequented High through Sikkim and Tibet, London: The Scholartis Press – via archive.org
- Fatma, Eram (2017), India–China Border Trade: A Case Study of Sikkim's Nathu La: A Case Study of Sikkim's Nathu La, KW Publishers, ISBN 978-93-86288-64-6
- Kawaguchi, Ekai (1909), Three Years in Tibet, Adyar, Madras: The Theosophist Office – via archive.org
- Lamb, Alastair (1966), The McMahon Line: a Study in the Relations Between, India, China and Tibet, 1904 to 1914, Vol. 1: Morley, Minto and Non-Interference in Tibet, Routledge & K. Paul
- McKay, Alex (1997), Tibet and the British Raj: The Frontier Cadre, 1904-1947, Psychology Press, ISBN 978-0-7007-0627-3
- Waddell, L. Austin (1905), Lhasa and its Mysteries, London: John Murray – via archive.org
- White, J. Claude (1909), Sikhim & Bhutan: Twenty-One Years on the North-East Frontier, 1887—1908, London: Edward Arnold – via archive.org
