= Chumbi =

Village in the Chumbi Valley of Tibet, China

Chumbi ཆུ་འབི • 春丕村
- Village
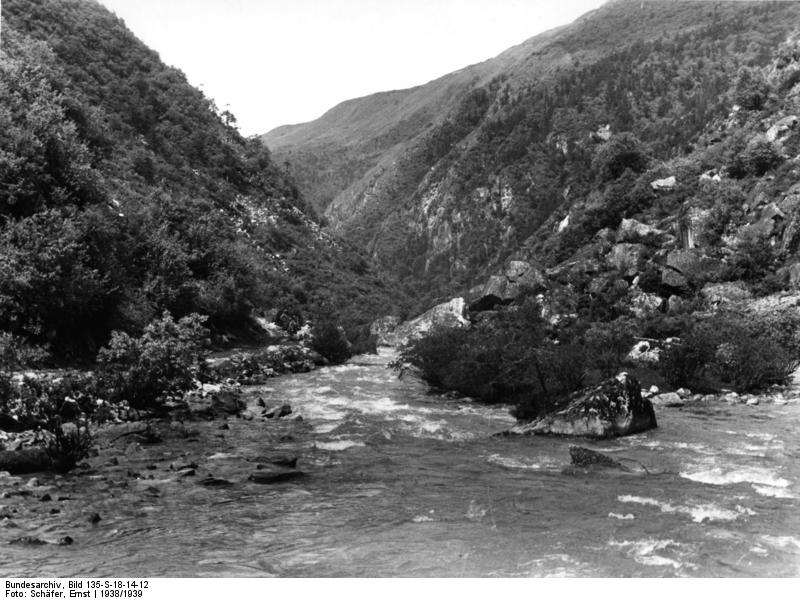
- Chumbi valley in early 20th century

- Location within Tibet Location within China Location within Asia Location within Earth
- Coordinates: 27.4445°N 88.922°E
- Country: China
- Autonomous Region: Tibet
- Prefecture-level city: Shigatse
- County: Yadong
- Town: Xarsingma

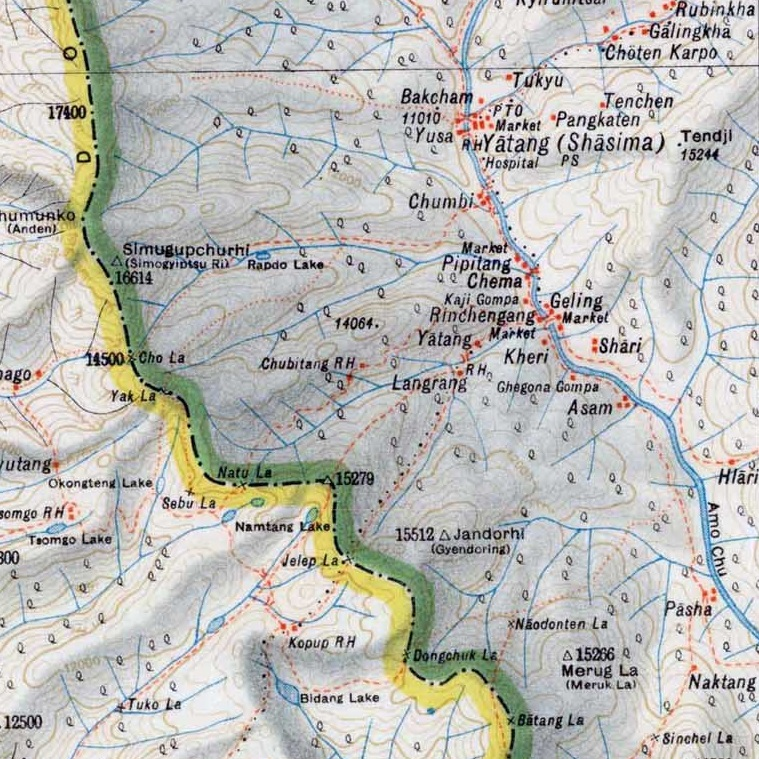
Map of lower Chumbi Valley (Survey of India, 1923): Chema is at the intersection of the Amo Chu Valley and the route from Nathu La.

Chumbi (Tibetan: ཆུ་འབི, Wylie: chu 'bi, THL: chu bi; Chinese: 春丕; pinyin: Chūn pī) is a historic village in the Chumbi Valley or the Yadong County of the Tibet Autonomous Region of China. It is in the valley of the Amo Chu River, where the route from Sikkim's Cho La Pass meets the Amo Chu Valley. The "Chumbi Valley" of the European nomenclature derives its name from the village of Chumbi. (Note: It is likely that prior to the European involvement, the term "Chumbi Valley" might have been used only for the lower Chumbi Valley below Yatung. The Tibetans call the overall Chumbi Valley "Tromo" with its headquarters at Phari.) It was the administrative center of the lower Chumbi Valley until the Chinese take-over of Tibet in 1950, after which Yatung became its headquarters. Chumbi is also associated with the Sikkim's royal family, which had a summer palace in the village.

== History ==
The Chumbi Valley was originally part of the Lepcha territory. In the 13th or 14th century, it began to be colonised by Khampas from the Kham region of Tibet. A Minyak prince called Khye Bumsa (Wylie: Gyad 'bum bsags) is said to have settled in Chumbi and established a small kingdom. He later built an alliance with the Lepchas in present-day Sikkim and expanded into that region. The ruins of the house built by Khye Bumsa were reportedly present in the Chumbi village till the end of the 19th century.

The lower Chumbi valley appears to have been under the control of the Lepchas till the time of the Fifth Dalai Lama. A Lepcha chieftain called Gaeboo Achyok (Gyalpo Ajok, r. c. 1660 – 1676) based at Damsang (in the present day Kalimpong district) faced invasions from the Bhutanese and obtained Dalai Lama's assistance. The Bhutanese captured and executed Achyok, after which the Tibetans continued to fight the Bhutanese. The end result of these conflicts is not clearly documented, but the Bhutanese were evicted from the lower Chumbi Valley and its control passed to the Sikkimese and Tibetans in some form. (Note: The "Sikkim" mentioned in these sources is mainly southeastern Sikkim, which appears to have extended on both the sides of the Jelep La pass. Chogyals' Sikkim was to the west of the Teesta River. After the elimination of the Damsang chieftaincy, the way was opened for the Chogyals to expand east of the river.)

The Sikkim Chogyals constructed a palace at Chumbi during the reign of Chakdor Namgyal (r. 1700–1717), who is said to have received the lower Chumbi valley as an estate from the Tibetan government. It came to be used as a regular summer residence of the Chogyals since 1780. The Chogyals regarded the people of the lower Chumbi Valley as their subjects until 1959, irrespective of the prevailing official boundaries.

== Geography ==
The village of Chumbi is roughly in the centre of the stretch of Amo Chu valley between Yatung and Rinchengang. The road from the Cho La pass on the Sikkim border arrives here. On the Sikkimese side of the pass, there was a direct road to Tumlong, the capital of Sikkim and the seat of its royalty in the 18th and 19th centuries.

About 2 miles (3.2 km) upstream from Chumbi lies the town of Yatung (Shasima), the present headquarters of the Yadong County. Downstream from Chumbi are the twin villages of Chema and Pipitang, where the route from the Nathu La pass arrives, and Rinchengang, which receives the route from the Jelep La pass.

== Bibliography ==
- Aris, Michael (1979), Bhutan: The Early History of a Himalayan Kingdom, Warminster, England: Aris & Phillips Ltd., ISBN 0-85668-082-6
- Bhanja, K. C. (1944), Lure of the Himalaya, Darjeeling: Gilbert & Co – via archive.org
- Buchanan, Walter (June 1919), "A Recent Trip into the Chumbi Valley, Tibet", Geographical Journal, LIII (6) – via archive.org
- Easton, John (1928), An Unfrequented High through Sikkim and Tibet, London: The Scholartis Press – via archive.org
- Fatma, Eram (2017), India–China Border Trade: A Case Study of Sikkim's Nathu La: A Case Study of Sikkim's Nathu La, KW Publishers, ISBN 978-93-86288-64-6
- Kawaguchi, Ekai (1909), Three Years in Tibet, Adyar, Madras: The Theosophist Office – via archive.org
- Lamb, Alastair (1966), The McMahon Line: a Study in the Relations Between, India, China and Tibet, 1904 to 1914, Vol. 1: Morley, Minto and Non-Interference in Tibet, Routledge & K. Paul
- Markham, Clements R. (1876), Narratives of the Mission of George Bogle to Tibet and of the Journey of Thomas Manning to Lhasa, London: Trubner and Co – via archive.org
- Mullard, Saul (2011), Opening the Hidden Land: State Formation and the Construction of Sikkimese History, BRILL, ISBN 978-90-04-20895-7
- Perry, Cindy L. (1997), Nepali around the World: Emphasizing Nepali Christians of the Himalayas, Ekta Books
- Shakabpa, Tsepon Wangchuk Deden (1984) [first published Yale University Press 1967], Tibet: A Political History, New York: Potala Publications, ISBN 0-9611474-0-7
- Shakabpa, Tsepon Wangchuk Deden (2009), One Hundred Thousand Moons: An Advanced Political History of Tibet, BRILL, ISBN 978-90-04-17732-1
- Siiger, Halfdan (1967), The Lepchas: Culture and Religion of a Himalayan People, Part I, Copenhagen: The National Museum of Denmark – via archive.org
- Waddell, L. Austin (1905), Lhasa and its Mysteries, London: John Murray – via archive.org
- White, J. Claude (1909), Sikhim & Bhutan: Twenty-One Years on the North-East Frontier, 1887—1908, London: Edward Arnold – via archive.org
