= Old Yatung =

Place in Tibet

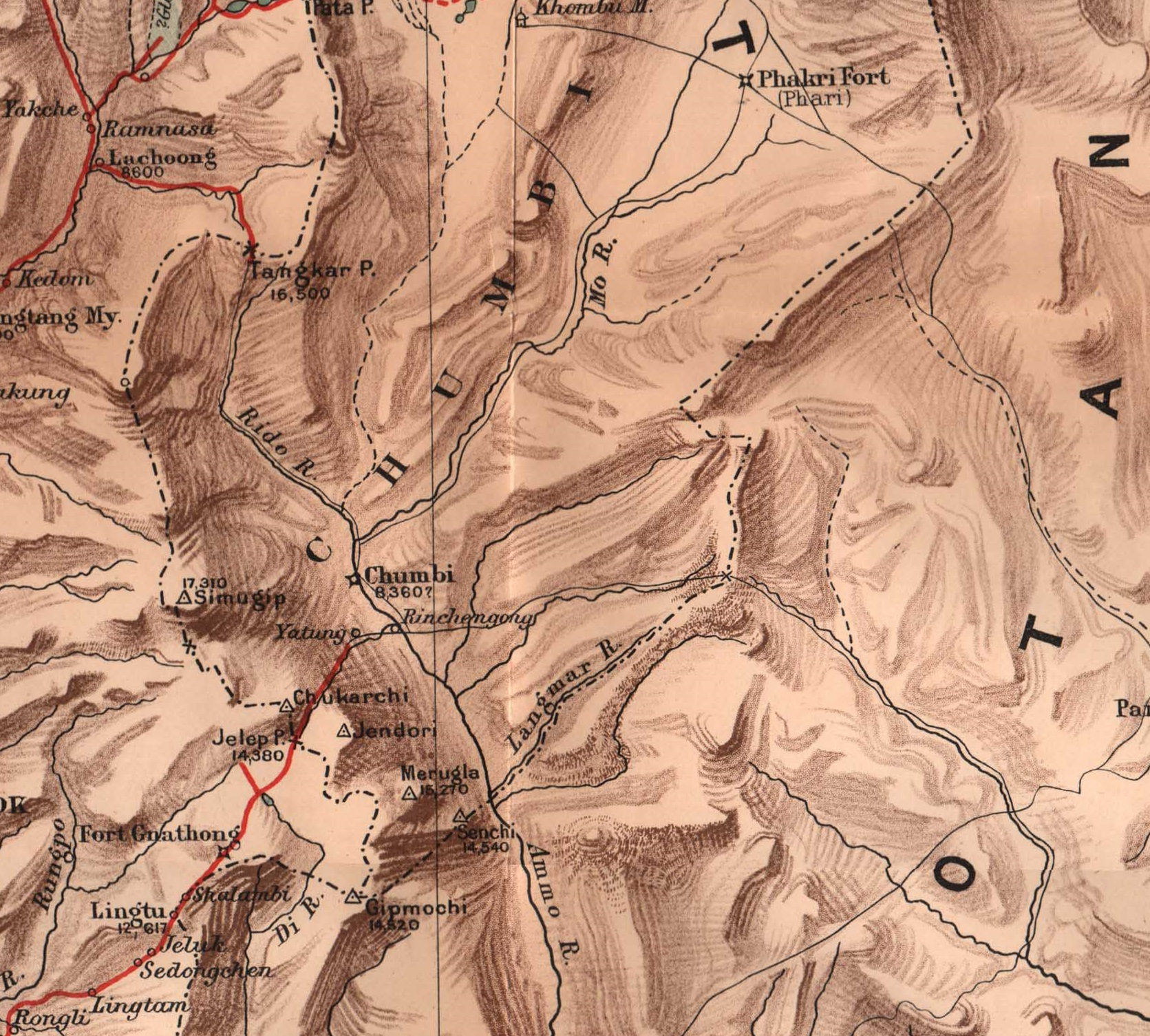
Map of Chumbi Valley in 1898, showing Yatung west of Rinchengang. (The red line shows the route allowed for British Indian traders before the Younghusband Expedition.)

Old Yatung (Chinese: 老亚东; pinyin: Lǎo Yàdōng), originally just "Yatung", with a native Tibetan spelling of Nyatong or Myatong, is a location 2 miles west of Rinchengang in the lower Chumbi Valley in the present day Yadong County of Tibet. It is in the valley of Yatung Chu, the river that flows down from Jelep La to join the Amo Chu river near Rinchengang. But according to travel writer John Easton, Yatung is actually a hill top location adjoining the valley, which has a historic Kagyu monastery. The monastery itself lies along the route from the Nathu La pass via Champithang.

Yatung entered history as the location offered by China for a trade mart of British India in the 1893 trade regulations. After the 1904 Younghusband Expedition, the British founded a new town at the confluence of Kangphu Chu and Tromo Chu rivers (the two headwaters of Amo Chu) and named this town "Yatung". It was to become a trading center and the eventual headquarters of the Yadong County. The original Yatung has been subsequently referred to as "Old Yatung".

== Name ==
According to a historical dictionary, the name "Yatung" (simplified Chinese: 亚东; traditional Chinese: 亞東; pinyin: Yàdōng; Wade–Giles: Ya-tung) is the Chinese rendering of a Tibetan place name meaning "nasal bridge mountain". The dictionary does not state the original Tibetan name, but the Japanese monk Ekai Kawaguchi states it as "Nyatong". (Some other British sources mention it as "Myatong".) Tibetologist L. Austine Waddell spells it as "Na-dong", and states that it means "the ear".

== Geography ==
Old Yatung sites

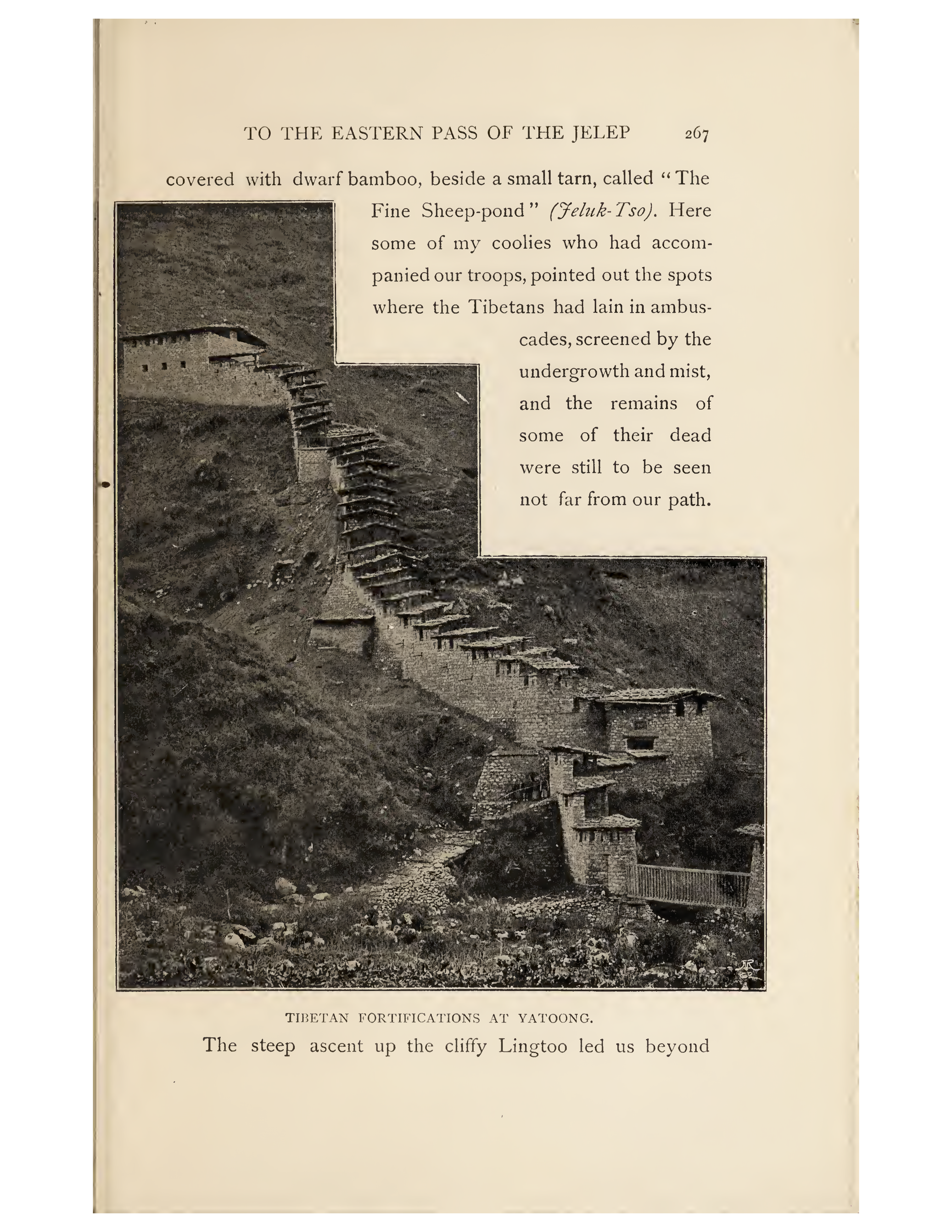
The Tibetan fortification at Yatung

The Yatung ("nasal bridge") mountain is on the west bank of the Amo Chu river between the Chema and Rinchengang in the Chumbi Valley (or Yadong County). The track to the Nathu La pass runs on the southern shoulder of the mountain, passing by a Kagyu monastery. This location is the original "Yatung" according to travel writer John Easton.

To the south of the Yatung mountain flows the Yatung Chu river, originating below the Jelep La pass and joining Amo Chu near Rinchengang. The valley of Yatung Chu is more commonly associated with the locations of "Yatng". A Pasha gompa (Buddhist temple) was located in its valley below the Kagyu monastery, but is said to have been abandoned in 1888, and later moved to the precincts of the Kagyu monastery.

A little upstream from the Pasgha gompa in the Yatung Chu valley was a customs house run by the Chinese Maritime Customs Service, which often employed Englishmen as commissioners. Its first Commissioner in 1894 was F. E. Taylor, but, during the Younghusband Expedition, a certain Captain Parr was apparently posted to handle the encounter. Indian traders were only allowed to come up to this point. So the customs house also had some overnight halting facilities. All these locations were associated with the name "Yatung".

Upstream from the customs house is the confluence of a stream called Champi Chu that flows down from the Nathu La pass. While the route to Nathu La was on the mountain shoulder above Champi Chu, the route to Jelep La was in theh narrow valley of Yatung Chu. It was described as being steep and slippery. The route from Nathu La was considered superior as it ran on the shoulder of the mountain, but the Tibetans only allowed trade through Jelep La until later British pressure in the 20th century.

== History ==
In the 1893 trade regulations, China agreed to the British India setting up a trade mart at "Yatung", which was located near the Chinese customs house. Though sources occasionally allude to a "Yatung village", there was in fact none.

== Bibliography ==
- Papers Relating to Tibet, London: His Majesty's Stationery Office, 1904 – via archive.org
- Further Papers Relating to Tibet, London: His Majesty's Stationery Office, 1920 – via archive.org
- Candler, Edmund (1905), The Unveiling of Lhasa, London: Longmans, Green & Co – via archive.org
- Easton, John (1928), An Unfrequented High through Sikkim and Tibet, London: The Scholartis Press – via archive.org
- Fader, H. Louis (2002), Called from Obscurity: The Life and Times of a True Son of Tibet, God's Humble Servant from Poo, Gergan Dorje Tharchin, Vol. 2, Tibet Mirror Press, ISBN 978-99933-922-0-0
- Fleming, Peter (1961), Bayonets to Lhasa, New York: Harper & Brothers – via archive.org
- Kawaguchi, Ekai (1909), Three Years in Tibet, Adyar, Madras: The Theosophist Office – via archive.org
- Paget, William Henry (1907), Frontier and Overseas Expeditions from India, Vol. IV – North and North-Eastern Frontier Tribes, Simla: Government Monotype Press – via archive.org
- Waddell, L. Austin (1905), Lhasa and its Mysteries, London: John Murray – via archive.org
