= Xiayadong Township =

Xiayadong Township 下亚东乡 གྲོ་མོ་སྨད་ཆུས Dromo Mechü
- Township
- Location within China Location within Tibet
- Coordinates: 27°25′46″N 88°55′39″E
- Country: China
- Autonomous region: Tibet
- Prefecture-level city: Shigatse
- County: Yadong County

Area
  - Total: 204.7 km^{2} (79.0 sq mi)

Population (2018)
  - Total: 897
  - Density: 4.38/km^{2} (11.3/sq mi)

Xiayadong Township (simplified Chinese: 下亚东乡; traditional Chinese: 下亞東鄉; pinyin: Xiàyàdōng Xiāng; lit. 'Lower Yadong'), known in Tibetan as Dromo Mechü (Tibetan: གྲོ་མོ་སྨད་ཆུས, Wylie: gro-mo smad-chus) is a township in the Chumbi Valley in Yadong County, Shigatse, in the Tibet Autonomous Region of China. Much of the township's area comprises disputed territory: the township spans an area of 204.7 square kilometres (79.0 mi^{2}), excluding disputed territory, and 650.88 square kilometres (251.31 mi^{2}) including it. Xiayadong Township's population totaled 897 as of 2018.

The township straddles the disputed Bhutan-China border, near the sites of the 2017 China-India border standoff.

Xiayadong Township in Yadong County, along with territories in Bhutan claimed by China as part of the Township. (Note: The borders are marked by contributors to OpenStreetMap. They may not be fully accurate.)

== Geography ==
The township's center is the village of Rinchengang, on the bank of the Amo Chu valley, which also receives the track from Sikkim's Jelep La pass. In addition to Rinchengang, the township also includes the Geling, Chema and Pipitang villages upstream along the Amo Chu, and Assam-Rotsa (or Asamthang) downstream.

In addition, the Township includes large territories in Bhutan that China claims. These include the Doklam region, Lulin and Charitang. These claims however do not find historical support in the testimony of British Indian officials. (Note: According to John Claude White, the British Political Officer in Sikkim in early 20th century, the border between Tibet and Bhutan was somewhere between the Langmarpo and Charitang rivers. Orientalist L. Austine Waddell also shows the border between Tibet and Bhutan running from the Mount Gipmochi, via Sinchela, to the Charitang river. (Charitang is incorrectly labelled as Langmarpo.))

== Demographics ==
As of 2018, Xiayadong Township has a population of 897. The township had a population of 1,097 as of 2010.

== Administrative divisions ==
Xiayadong administers two administrative villages: Rinchengang and Chema.

== See also ==
- 2017 China-India border standoff
- Bhutan-China border
- Chema
- Pangda
- Rinchengang
- Yadong County

== Notes ==
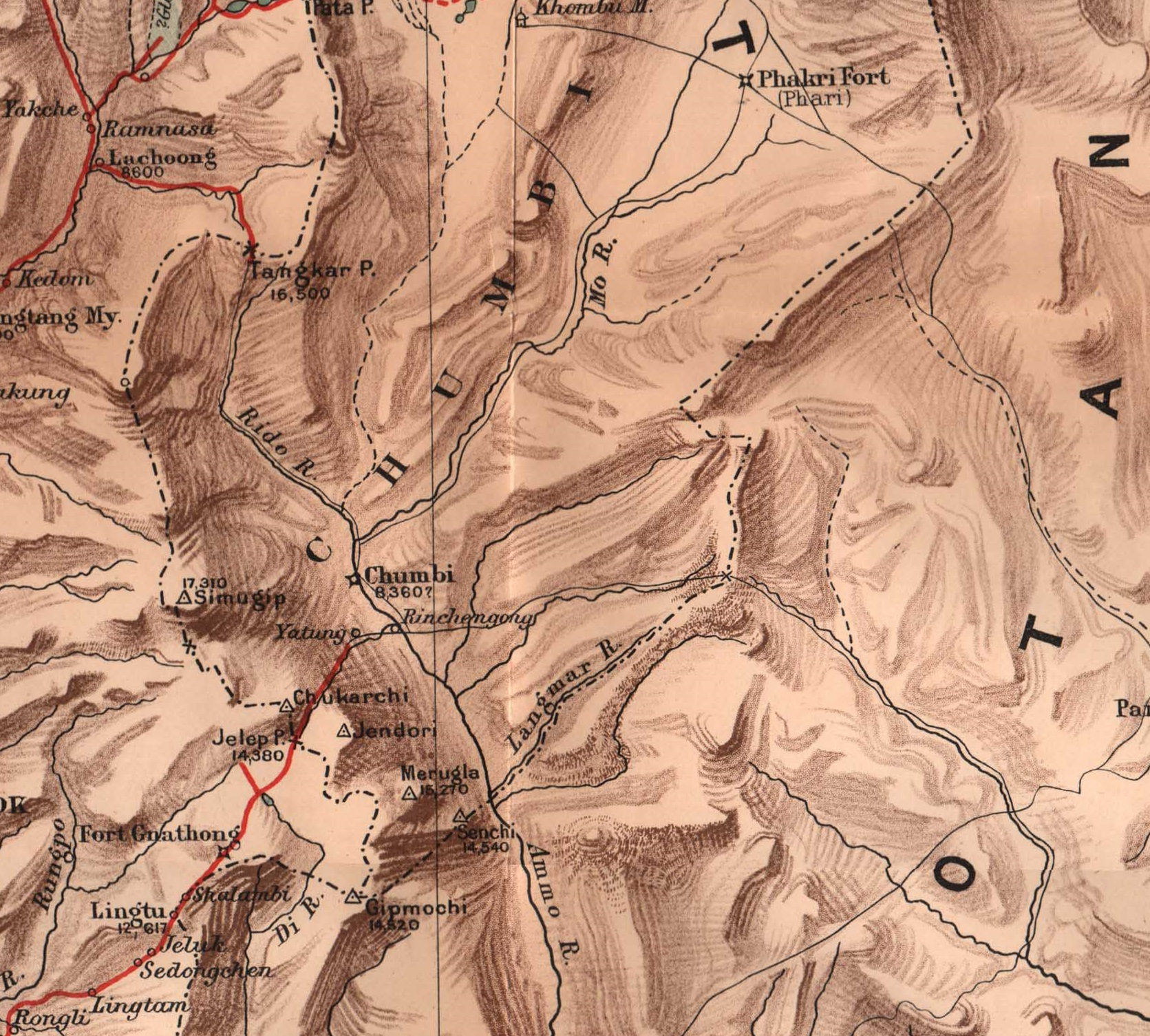
Map by Waddell

== Bibliography ==
- White, J. Claude (1909), Sikhim & Bhutan: Twenty-One Years on the North-East Frontier, 1887—1908, Vivek Publishing House – via archive.org
