= Rinchengang =

Rinchengang རིན་ཆེན་སྒང
- Town
- 仁青岗村 Rén qīng gǎng cūn
- Location within Tibet Location within China Location within Asia
- Coordinates: 27.43°N 88.928°E
- Country: China
- County: Yadong

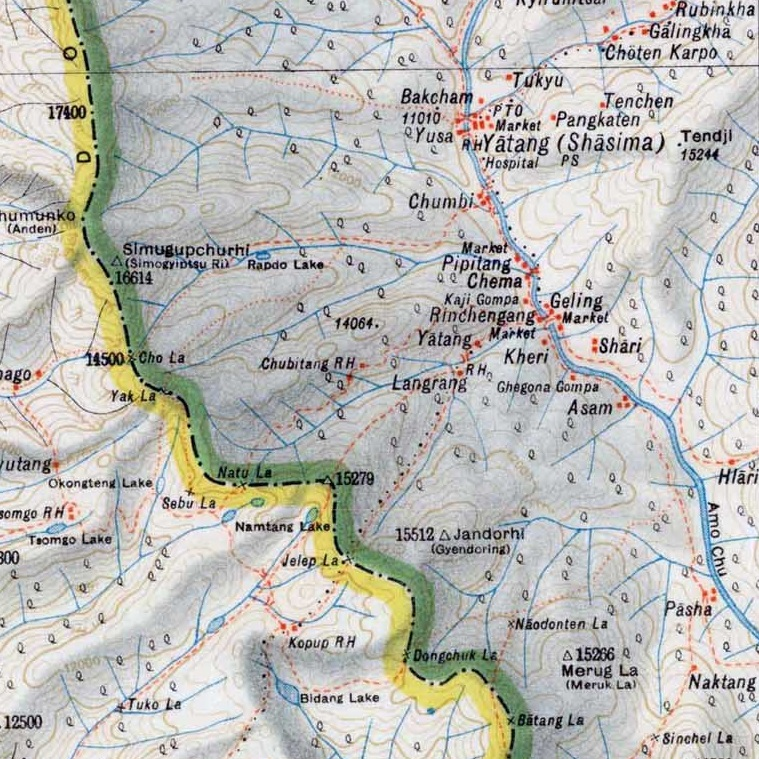
Map 1: Map of lower Chumbi Valley (Survey of India, 1923): Rinchengang is at the intersection of the Amo Chu Valley and the route from Jelep La.

Rinchengang (Note: Other spellings include Richen Gang, Richengang, and Rinchengong. It is now more commonly spelt in the Chinese pinyin spelling Renqinggang, sometimes as Renchinggang. Some authors use the traditional name of Chumbi Valley as a prefix, Tomo-Renchingang.) (Tibetan: རིན་ཆེན་སྒང, Wylie: rin chen sgang, THL: rin chen gang, ZWPY: Rinqêngang) or Renqinggang (Chinese: 仁青岗村; pinyin: Rén qīng gǎng cūn) is a town in the Chumbi Valley and the headquarters of the Xia Yadong Township of Yadong County, Tibet region of China. It is in the valley of Amo Chu where the route from Sikkim's Jelep La pass meets Amo Chu. It is also close to the Bhutan–China border (Doklam area), which is currently in dispute. In December 2018, Rinchengang village had a population of around 550 people. The inhabitants are engaged in animal grazing or work as forest rangers. Some also carry supplies to Chinese border troops.

In 2003, the governments of India and China agreed to use Rinchengang as a border trade mart, along with Changgu in Sikkim. It is also the corresponding trade mart for Sherathang.

== Geography ==
Rinchengang is in the main Chumbi valley, on the west bank of the Amo Chu river. A stream called Yatung Chu that brings waters from the Jelep La and Nathu La passes on the Sikkim border, joins Amo Chu here. The town has one of the largest tracts of flat land in the Chumbi valley covering around 580 sq km of grasslands and forests. It is also one of the last villages in the Amo Chu valley before the river enters Bhutan.

Being a spacious location and close to both Sikkim and Bhutan, Rinchengang seems to have always played the role of a trading centre. Archibald Campbell, the Deputy Commissioner of Darjeeling, wrote in 1848 that the people of all three countries, Sikkim, Bhutan and Tibet, traded here.

There was a bridge over Amo Chu at Rinchengang, which provided routes into Bhutan on both the banks of the Amo Chu river: the eastern one going via the Charitang valley towards Haa, and the western one going via the Doklam plateau to Sangbay. (See Map 1) From the Doklam plateau, there was also a route to the Dichu basin (Tendu and Sipchu).

In December 1903 Laurence Waddell passed through Rinchengang on his way to Lhasa and described it as follows:

Craggy mountains rise on either side into jagged snow-streaked peaks banded by dark pines, and between, the clear green waters of the Mo river... The meadow here is a quarter of a mile broad, and its turfy terraces, sprinkled with the frosted remains of last year’s wild-flowers... are dotted freely over with fine large houses, two- and three-storeyed in the Swiss chalet style, with widely-projecting eaves and wooden balconies carved and gaudily painted. The village of Rinchengang consists of about forty of these handsome houses, much superior to any native house in Sikhim or even at Darjeeling. They are closely clustered between narrow lanes, and all are picked out in bright colours, giving an air of prosperity and comfort.

Rinchengang was prosperous. Being on the route from the Jelep La pass, it participated in the trade between Tibet and the Indian towns Kalimpong and Darjeeling as well as Sikkim's Gangtok. Indian traders were not allowed beyond the Yatung customs house (Old Yatung). So traders from Rinchengang exploited the gap, leading to their prosperity.

There is a Kagyu Monastery on a hill top near Rinchengang, which is said to have been established by Cangba Ada, a monk from the Shangpa Kagyu sect in 1747. According to British traveller John Easton, the hilltop was called Yatung ("nose bridge mountain") and from it was derived the name of Old Yatung in the valley below. During the Cultural Revolution in China the Kagyu Monastery took some damage. However a restoration was undertaken and many of the cultural relics are preserved.

== History ==
=== Colonial period ===
In the early 1900s, the people of Rinchengang were middlemen traders between central Tibet and the markets in Darjeeling and Calcutta. Ekai Kawaguchi, a Japanese Buddhist monk who travelled in Tibet, chronicled the usage of mules to transport wool from Tomo-Rinchen-gang to Kalenpong. He recorded the fortress of Nyatong (Old Yatung) located close to the grazing grounds of Rinchengang.

After the Younghusband Expedition (1903–1904), the British moved the trade mart to (new) Yatung and also opened the Nathu La pass for travel from Sikkim. Thus, Rinchengang was bypassed and it must have seen reduction in its prospects.

=== Post-colonial period ===
Map 2: Rinchengang and vicinity

In 1950, the People's Liberation Army moved into Tibet and they established barracks at Richengang. The presence of the Army also meant that the trade through the Chumbi Valley boomed. New roads and communications were established. Sugar, textiles and food items (called rgya zog – Indian goods) went through the Chumbi Valley so much so that the Chumbi Valley was more prosperous than Beijing in the 1950s.

All this came to an end with the Tibetan uprising of 1959. Tensions between India and China increased, and both the countries hampered trade. Following the Sino-India war in 1962, the border crossings at Nathu La and Jelep La were closed. They were not reopened till 2005.

=== Present ===
In 2005 India and China signed a Memorandum of Understanding on border trade with regard to reopening Nathu La. China built anew trade mart at Donqingang on the hilltop near the Kagyu monastery in 2006, and trade between the Chumbi Valley and Sikkim was resumed. In a throwback to the old times, the Indian traders were not allowed to go beyond Donqingang. Rinchengang, 11 km away, was still inaccessible.

Before the construction of Rinchengang as a market, according to a trader from Sikkim, Motilal Lakhotia, "Richengang was just a small settlement with some houses and cultivated fields and something they would just pass by on their tedious journey."

== Bibliography ==
Secondary sources

- Easton, John (1928), An Unfrequented High through Sikkim and Tibet, London: The Scholartis Press – via archive.org
- Fader, H. Louis (2002), Called from Obscurity: The Life and Times of a True Son of Tibet, God's Humble Servant from Poo, Gergan Dorje Tharchin, Vol. 2, Tibet Mirror Press, ISBN 978-99933-922-0-0
- Fatma, Eram (2017), India–China Border Trade: A Case Study of Sikkim's Nathu La: A Case Study of Sikkim's Nathu La, KW Publishers, ISBN 978-93-86288-64-6
- Harris, Tina (2013), Geographical Diversions: Tibetan Trade, Global Transactions, University of Georgia Press, ISBN 978-0-8203-4512-3
- Harris, Tina (2017), "The Mobile and the Material in the Himalayan Borderlands", in Saxer, Martin; Zhang, Juan (eds.), The Art of Neighbouring, Making Relations Across China's Borders, Amsterdam University Press, p. 161, ISBN 978-94-6298-258-1, JSTOR j.ctt1jd94h1.11
- Kawaguchi, Ekai (1909), Three Years in Tibet, Adyar, Madras: The Theosophist Office – via archive.org
- Mathou, Thierry (2004), "Bhutan–China Relations: Towards a New step in Himalayan Politics" (PDF), The Spider and The Piglet: Proceedings of the First International Seminar on Bhutanese Studies (PDF), Thimpu: The Centre for Bhutan Studies, archived from the original (PDF) on 2023-01-05
- Shakabpa, Tsepon Wangchuk Deden (2009), One Hundred Thousand Moons: An Advanced Political History of Tibet, BRILL, ISBN 978-90-04-17732-1
- Waddell, L. Austin (1905), Lhasa and its Mysteries, London: John Murray – via archive.org
- White, J. Claude (1971), Sikhim & Bhutan: Twenty-One Years on the North-East Frontier, 1887—1908, Vivek Publishing House – via archive.org

Primary sources

- India. Ministry of External Affairs, ed. (1959), Notes, Memoranda and Letters Exchanged and Agreements Signed Between the Governments of India and China: 1954-1959 (PDF), Ministry of External Affairs
