= Yatung =

Yatung ཤར་གསིང་མ་ · 下司马镇 Shasima, Xarsingma
- Town
- Xiasima
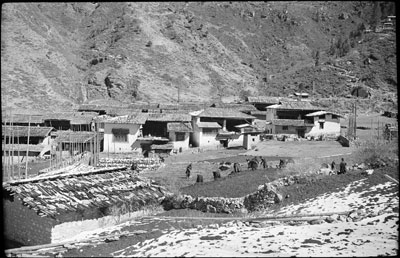
- Upper Yatung, 1937

- Location within Tibet
- Coordinates: 27°28′55″N 88°54′26″E
- Country: China
- Autonomous region: Tibet
- Prefecture-level city: Xigazê
- County: Yadong

Population
  - Total
  - Major Nationalities: Tibetan
  - Regional dialect: Tibetan language
- Time zone: UTC+8 (CST)

Yatung or Yadong, also known as Shasima (Tibetan: ཤར་གསིང་མ་, Wylie: shar gsing ma, THL: sharsingma, simplified Chinese: 下司马镇; traditional Chinese: 下司馬鎮; pinyin: Xiàsīmǎ Zhèn), (Note: Alternative spellings include Xarsingma, Shashima, and Xiasima.) is the principal town in the Chumbi Valley or Yadong County in the Tibet Autonomous Region of China. It is also its administrative headquarters.

== Name ==
The village is known locally as Shasima (Sharsingma) to the Tibetans, believed to be a Lepcha name. During the British Raj era, it was called Yatung, the name having been transferred from another location called "Yatung" in the valley between the Jelep La and Rinchengang. The original location later came to be called Old Yatung.

The Chinese administration of Tibet uses the name Yatung/Yadong for the county, and the name Shasima for the town.

== Geography ==
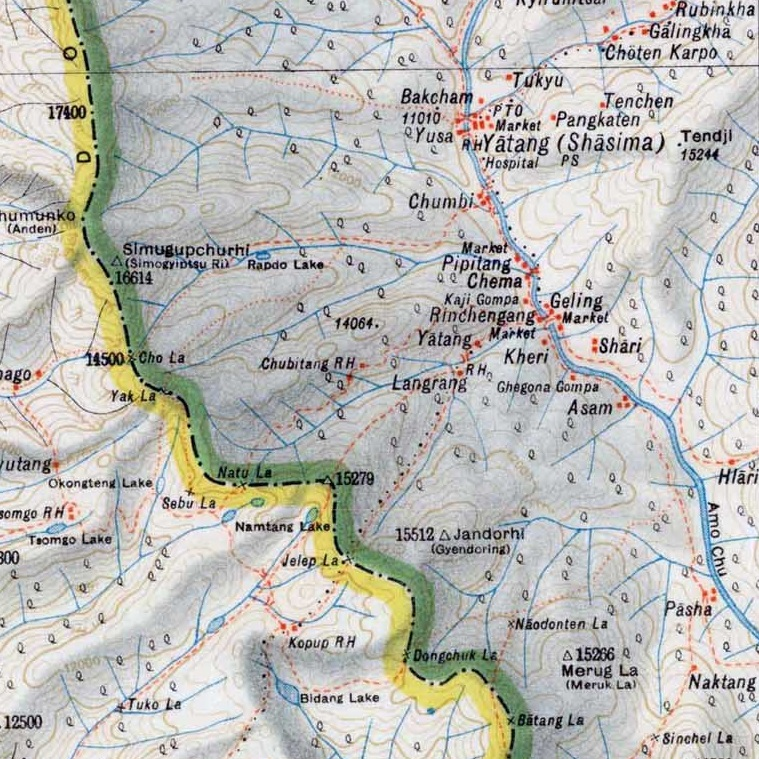
Map of lower Chumbi Valley (Survey of India, 1923): Old Yatung marked as "Yatang" on the way from Jelep La and New Yatung marked as "Yatang (Shasima)"

Yatung is at the confluence of the Khambu Chu (Tibetan: ཁམ་བུ་མ་ཆུ, Wylie: kham bu ma chu) and Tromo Chu (or Machu, Chinese: 麻曲; pinyin: Má qū) rivers, which join here to form the Amo Chu river before it flows into Bhutan. (Note: Amo Chu is a Bhutanese name for the river, which is used in English. Tibetans call it Machu.) Downstream along Amo Chu are further villages of Chumbi, Pipitang and Chema, within four miles distance. A further village after them is Rinchengang, which is regarded as a market town for cross-border trade.

The road to Nathu La and Jelep La passes (Note: Only Nathu La is operational in post-war trade normalisation with India.) on the Sikkim border takes off from Pipitang/Chema. The Tibetans of Chumbi Valley (referred to as "Tromowa") used to use this route to reach Kalimpong in British India, which was a major trading centre.

== History ==
=== Origins ===
Prior to 1904, there was a small village called Yusa (Note: Also called Yusakha, with alternative spellings Eusaka and Eusakha. Shasima would appear to be the name of the larger area around the village.) on the bank of the Amo Chu river. During the Younghusband Expedition, the British troops camped on the vacant high ground above the Yusa village. Younghusband named the location "New Chumbi", treating it as an outpost of Chumbi, the headquarters of the lower Chumbi Valley. He also had a bungalow house constructed at New Chumbi. During the three years of British administration of the Chumbi Valley (1904–1908), the British administrator lived in the house and it came to function as the administrative headquarters of the Chumbi Valley. A trade market, a hospital and a post-and-telegraph office (PTO) also came to be located here. During this period, the location was called simply "Chumbi", and treated as an extension of the Chumbi town. (Note: The British house was referred to by the Dalai Lama as "Gyelten Kotri in Dromo Sharsing[ma]".)

After the Chumbi Valley was transferred back to Tibet in 1908, the British government in London ruled that the British official in the Chumbi Valley would thereafter function as the "British Trade Agent at Yatung", thereby imparting the name Yatung to this location. It was called Yatung–Shasima or New Yatung to distinguish it from the original Yatung. But, over time, "Yatung" came to mean the new location.

=== 1905–1950 ===
From 1905 onwards, Yatung functioned as a trade agency for traders from British India, taking over the functions of Old Yatung, which was never used by the British again. Chinese customs office was still at Old Yatung and goods coming via Jelep La were checked there. Scholars note that the new trade agency did not bring any significant improvements to trade, which remained at roughly Rs. 30,000 level. The Chinese amban in Lhasa posted a deputy at Yatung, who is said to have been obstructive of trade relations.

In 1910, China's assistant amban at Chamdo, Zhao Erfeng, arranged an effective Chinese invasion of Tibet. The Dalai Lama escaped from Lhasa in the nick of time and made his way to Yatung, where he received British protection. Chinese officials came here to negotiate with the Dalai Lama. But he declined their entreaties and moved on to Sikkim, where he stayed until Chinese power was exhausted in Tibet. In the interim, Chinese garrisons were posted at Yatung, and the powers of the Tibetan officials were stripped.

Not long afterwards, China underwent the 1911 Xinhai Revolution, and the Chinese garrisons at Yatung and Gyantse became mutinous. Their commander, General Chung Ying, overthrew the amban and declared himself the successor, claiming to act on behalf of the new Chinese Republic. The amban's officials then sought refuge from the British trade agent. But the troops were out of control and the Tibetans were in open rebellion. Soon, the troops, and then the General, fled Tibet, through Yatung and Sikkim. British India gave them safe passage to China. (Note: Chung left Lhasa in December 1912, but stayed in Chumbi for a few months and crossed into India on 14 April 1913. After returning to Peking, he found the former amban Lien Yu in an influential position. Chung was tried and executed in 1915.)

David MacDonald, a British officer with Lepcha heritage, worked as the trade agent at Yatung from 1909 to 1924. The post was combined with that of Gyantse trade agency till 1936, after which British India appointed Norbu Dhondup. (Note: Norbu Dhondup was a native of the Indian border land, either Sherpa or Tibetan, who was taken from the Darjeeling High School to assist the Younghusband Mission as a translator. He subsequently rose through ranks and commanded great respect from the British as well as the Tibetans.) Sonam Tobden Kazi took up the post in 1942 and served till the end of British Raj in 1947.

== Transportation ==
The China National Highway 265 connects Yatung to Phari, Gyantse and Shigatse. It also extends up to the Nathu La pass on the Sikkim border. Another provincial highway S208 goes via Khambu to Gyantse and beyond.

There were reports of plans for extending the Lhasa-Shigatse Railway to Yatung.

== See also ==
- List of towns and villages in Tibet

== Bibliography ==
- Bell, Charles (1924), Tibet Past and Present (First ed.), Oxford University Press
  - 1924 'first edition' reprinted by Asian Educational Services
  - Bell, Charles (1992), Tibet Past and Present, Motilal Banarsidass Publ., ISBN 978-81-208-1048-8
- Buchanan, Walter (June 1919), "A Recent Trip into the Chumbi Valley, Tibet", Geographical Journal, LIII (6): 403–410, doi:10.2307/1780416, JSTOR 1780416 – via archive.org
- Easton, John (1928), An Unfrequented High through Sikkim and Tibet, London: The Scholartis Press – via archive.org
- Fader, H. Louis (2002), Called from Obscurity: The Life and Times of a True Son of Tibet, God's Humble Servant from Poo, Gergan Dorje Tharchin, Vol. 2, Tibet Mirror Press, ISBN 978-99933-922-0-0
- Harris, Tina (2013), Geographical Diversions: Tibetan Trade, Global Transactions, University of Georgia Press, ISBN 978-0-8203-4512-3
- Lamb, Alastair (1966), The McMahon Line: A Study in the Relations Between, India, China and Tibet, 1904 to 1914, Vol. 1: Morley, Minto and Non-Interference in Tibet, Routledge & K. Paul – via archive.org
- McKay, Alex (1997), Tibet and the British Raj: The Frontier Cadre, 1904-1947, Psychology Press, ISBN 978-0-7007-0627-3
- Mehra, Parshotam (1974), The McMahon Line and After: A Study of the Triangular Contest on India's North-eastern Frontier Between Britain, China and Tibet, 1904-47, Macmillan, ISBN 9780333157374 – via archive.org
- Rawat, Bhawan Singh (2009), Travails of Border Trade (PDF), Munsayri, Pithoragarh: Malla Johr Vikas Samiti – via claudearpi.net
- Sandberg, Graham (1901), An Itinerary of the Route from Sikkim to Lhasa, Calcutta: Baptist Mission Press – via archive.org
- Shakabpa, Tsepon Wangchuk Deden (2009), One Hundred Thousand Moons: An Advanced Political History of Tibet, BRILL, ISBN 978-90-04-17732-1
- Waddell, L. Austin (1905), Lhasa and its Mysteries, London: John Murray – via archive.org
- Younghusband, Francis (1910). India and Tibet. London: John Murray.
