= Colman Macaulay =

Colman Patrick Louis Macaulay (16 September 1849 – 3 May 1890) CIE was an administrator in British India and partly responsible for negotiating the opening of British trade with Tibet.

== Early life ==
Macaulay was born in Belfast, Northern Ireland to Patrick Macaulay J.P. and the youngest daughter of Bernard Coleman, a Catholic from the West of Ireland. From the age of nine, he was educated at Ratcliffe College near Leicester, England, and later at the School of the Jesuit Fathers in Randalstown, County Antrim, before graduating from Queen's College in Belfast.

== India ==
In 1867, Macaulay passed the Indian Civil Service entrance examination and was sent to Bengal, in the north east of India as one of those selected by Sir George Campbell to test his theory that civilians should serve in all branches of the administration. After serving as District Inspector in Bacoorah he was appointed assistant secretary in the Bengal office in 1875. In May 1990 he became financial secretary to the Government of Bengal and was complemented on his efficiency by the Marquis of Rippon. Macaulay attracted the attention of Sir Richard Temple, Lieutenant-Governor of the Bengal Presidency, and was assigned to famine relief in the Burdwan division in 1874. In 1882, Macaulay submitted a bill for the extension of local self-government to the Bengal Legislative Council. He proposed that elected villager committees would manage their own pounds, schools and roads in a similar fashion to the Local Government Boards of contemporary Britain.

== Sikkim and Tibet ==
In October 1884, Macaulay convinced Secretary of State for India Lord Randolph Churchill of the need to undertake a mission to Tibet, which would include Tibetan scholar Sarat Chandra Das. It was agreed that he would first travel to Sikkim to discuss with its Chogyal the administration of the state and its relations with the British government. He was then to travel on to the Lachen Valley to investigate the feasibility of opening a trade route into Tibet's Ü-Tsang province and finally to attempt to establish friendly relations with the Tibetans to the north of Sikkim. Permission for entry to Tibet from India had been agreed in advance by the Chinese Qing authorities under the "Separate Article" contained in the 1876 Chefoo Convention. Macaulay was given the requisite visa despite the objections of some members of the Zongli Yamen with the notable exception of pro-reform minister Li Hongzhang. Macauly believed that a ready market existed in Tibet for Indian tea and British textiles, with Tibet exporting gold dust, musk and wool and assured the Sikkim Chogyal that the British would pay for the necessary roads and bridges while Sikkim would need to supply only labour.However, in 1885, "international concerns" arose and the British government cancelled the entire mission. On his return to Darjeeling, Macaulay wrote to India Office chief Sir Clements Markham that "everything had gone so fairly that it is difficult for us here to believe that we should be shipwrecked within sight of the promised land."

Although The Times correspondent in Calcutta claimed that this was "the most important step towards the opening of Thibet (sic) which has been taken since the days of Warren Hastings" it alarmed the Tibetans. They saw Macaulay's foray as the first move in a British invasion of their country and were provoked into their 1886 reclamation of the Jelep La from Sikkim. The British despatched the Sikkim Expedition in 1888 to evict Tibetan forces, who had set up a fort at Lingtu blocking the trade route. After a series of clashes between the two sides, the Chinese signed the 1890 Convention of Calcutta to restore peace to the region. The Tibetans still refused to honour the Convention, eventually leading to the 1904 Younghusband Expedition to Lhasa and the forcible opening of trade.

== Personal life ==
Macaulay's wife Mary died on 26 April 1889 at Brighton on the south coast of England.

== Death ==
Following home leave in Ireland and despite the advice of his doctors, Macaulay was anxious to return to India to secure a promotion to chief secretary. A day after reaching the house of his friend Sir Alfred Croft in Calcutta, Macaulay died on the evening of Friday, 3 March 1889 of "prostration due to excessive heat during the railway journey from Bombay to Calcutta."

== Works ==
- Macaulay, Colman (1885). Report of a Mission to Sikkim and the Tibetan Frontier with a Memorandum on our Relations with Tibet. Calcutta: Bengal Secretariat Press.

== Footnotes ==
1. A reference to the earlier missions to Tibet undertaken by George Bogle (1774) and Samuel Turner (1783), during the tenure of Warren Hastings as Governor-General of India.
