= Cho La (Sikkim and Tibet) =

Mountain pass in the Himalayas

- གྲོ་ལ
- Location within Sikkim
- Elevation: 5,196 m (17,047 ft)

Location
- Location: Sikkim, India – Tibet, China
- Range: Himalaya
- Coordinates: 27°25′22″N 88°48′04″E

Cho La
- Chinese: 卓拉山口
Transcriptions
Standard Mandarin
- Hanyu Pinyin: zhuō lā shānkǒu

Cho La or Cho-la (Tibetan: གྲོ་ལ, Wylie: gro la) is a mountain pass in the Chola range of the Himalayas. It connects the Indian state of Sikkim with China's Tibet Autonomous Region. It is situated around four miles to the north-west of Nathu La.

Cho La used to be the main mountain pass between Sikkim and the Chumbi Valley (Yadong County), connecting the Sikkimese capital of Tumlong with the Chumbi town. Towards the end of the 19th century, the British developed Jelep La, and later Nathu La, as they were accessible from British India, and Cho La fell into relative disuse.

== History ==
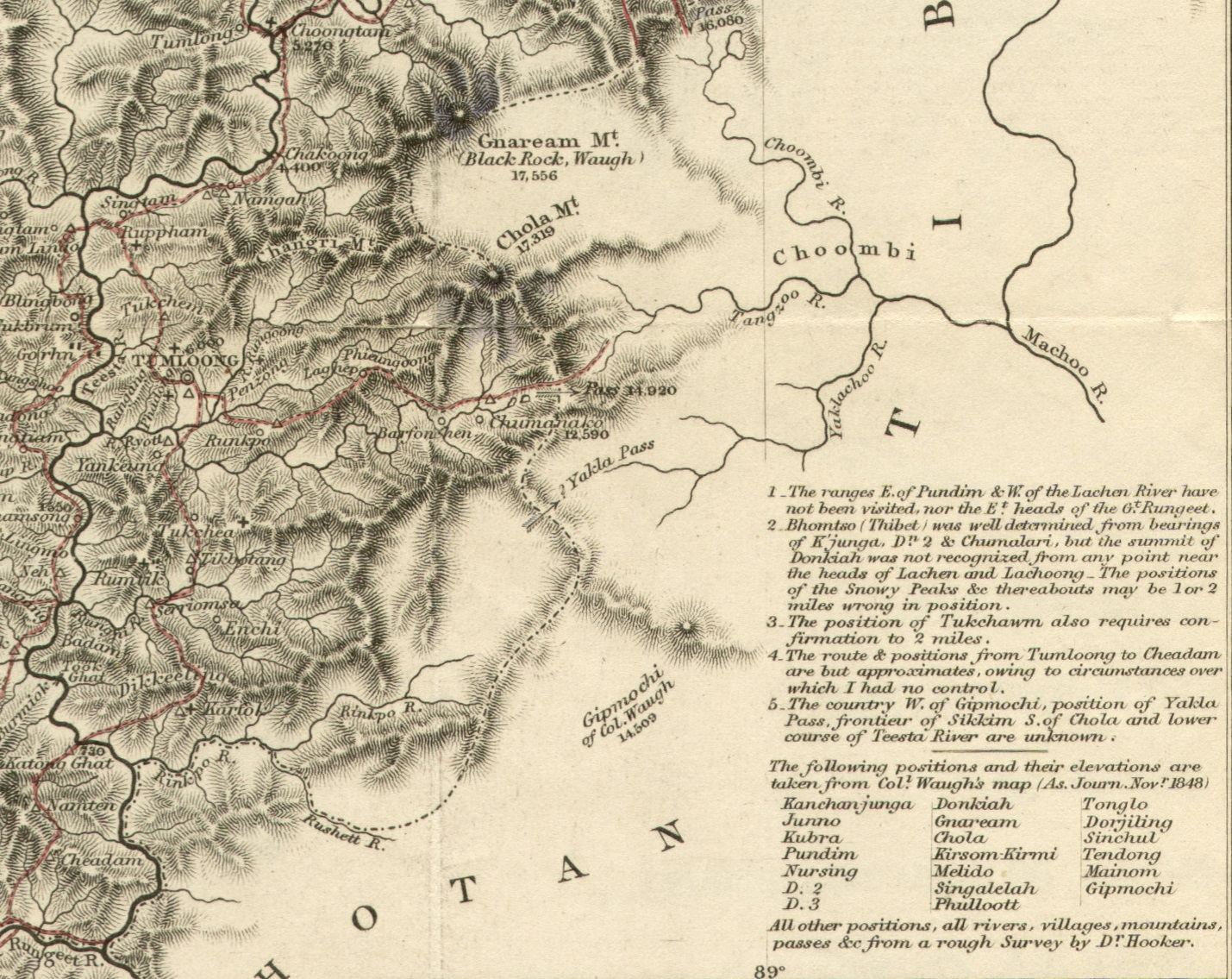
Southeast Sikkim section of Hooker's map

The Cho La pass was in regular used by the Sikkim royal family, which had a summer palace at Chumbi and used to spend summers there. The road between Tumlong and Chumbi via Cho La was kept in good condition. The route was also the main trading route between Sikkim and Tibet.

The first Europeans to visit the Chola Pass were Archibald Campbell (Darjeeling superintendent) and Joseph Dalton Hooker (botanist) in 1849, who attempted to travel to Chumbi in order to visit the Dewan who was staying there. Sikkim had an agreement with Tibet not to allow foreigners into the Tibetan territory. The two men were arrested at the Chola Pass and detained for several weeks. Sikkim had to face retribution from the British Raj for the insult caused.

The Cho La pass was one of the sites of the 1967 Nathu La and Cho La clashes between China and India, which concluded with Chinese withdrawal from both the Nathu La and Cho La passes.

== Transport ==
On the Indian side, there is a fair-weather mountain road linking the pass to Changgu on the Nathu-la road. On the Chinese side, there is a border outpost at 4,783 metres (15,692 ft) above sea level. Road to the outpost was repaved in 2016.

== Tourism ==
Cho La is part of the Bharat Ranbhoomi Darshan initiative of the Indian Military which will boost border tourism, patriotism, local infrastructure and economy while reversing civilian outward migration from these remote locations, it entails 77 battleground war memorials in border area including the Longewala War Memorial, Sadhewala War Memorial, Siachen base camp, Kargil, Galwan, Pangong Tso, Rezang La, Doklam, Bum La, Kibithu, etc.

== Bibliography ==
- Hooker, Joseph Dalton (1854), Himalayan Journals – Notes of a Naturalist in Bengal, the Sikkim and Nepal Himalayas, the Khasia Mountains etc., Vol. 1, London: John Murray – via archive.org
