= Dochen Tso =

Freshwater lake in the Tibet Region

- Duoqing Cuo
- མདོ་ཆེན་མཚོ (Standard Tibetan)
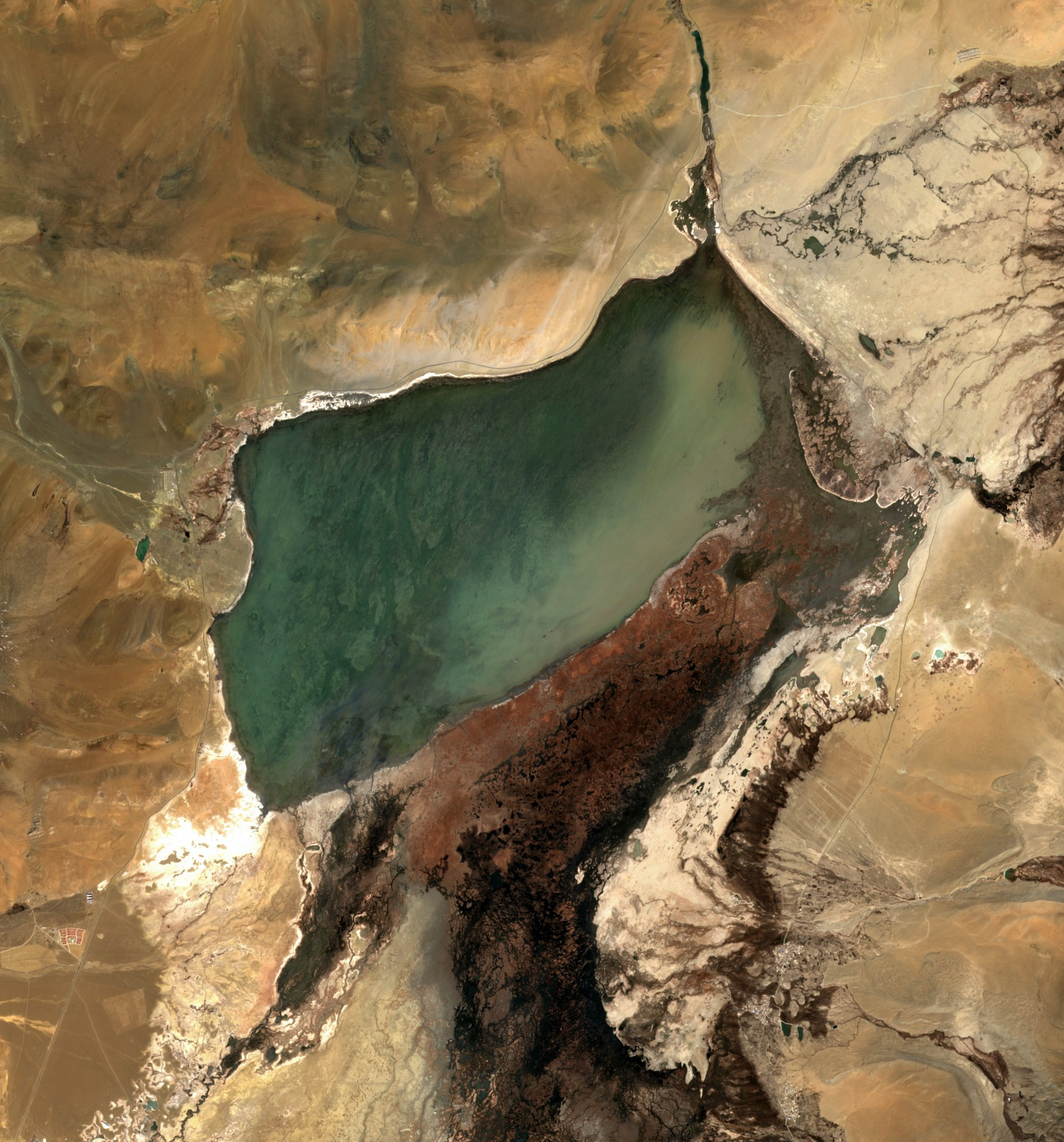
- Sentinel-2 image (2021)

- Location within Tibet
- Location: Yadong County, Shigatse Prefecture, Tibet, China
- Coordinates: 28°8′57″N 89°21′37″E
- Surface area: 62.67 km^{2} (24.20 sq mi)
- Surface elevation: 4,472 m (14,672 ft)
- Frozen: Winter

Dochen Tso (Tibetan: མདོ་ཆེན་མཚོ, Wylie: mdo chen mtsho, THL: do chen tso) or Duoqing Cuo (Chinese: 多庆错; pinyin: duōqìng cuò) is a high-altitude lake in Yadong County in the Tibet region of China.

== Location ==
The lake in located at 4,472 m (14,672 ft) above sea level, about 240 kilometers southwest of the regional capital Lhasa. The rivers Nimu Maqu and Qionggui Zangbu are the primary sources of water for the lake, and the lake's water is discharged into Galacuo, which is located 9 km further to the north.
