= Yadong County =

Yadong County 亚东县 • གྲོ་མོ་རྫོང Dromo, Tromo, Chomo
- County
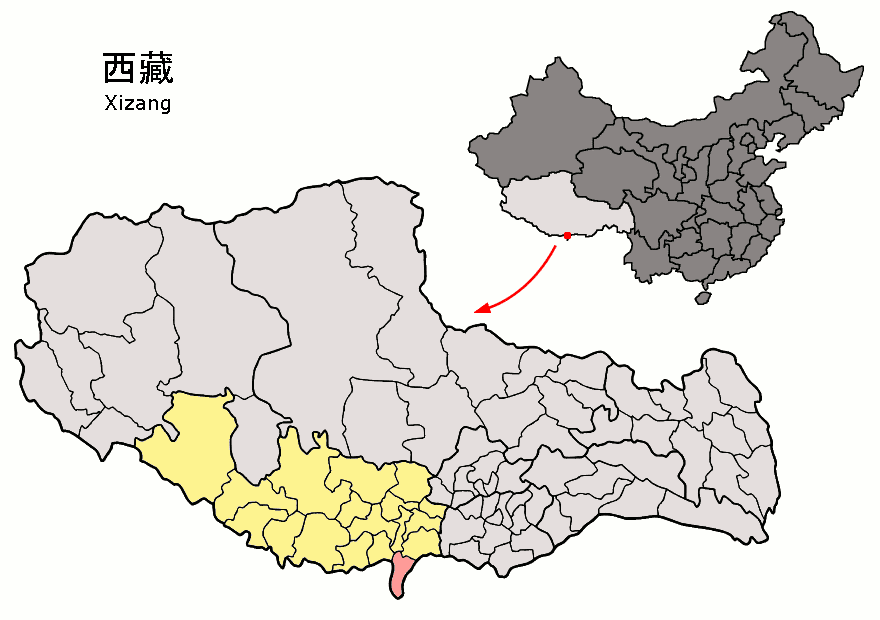
- Location of Yadong County (red) within Shigatse City (yellow) and the Tibet Autonomous Region

- Location of the seat in Tibet Yadong (China)
- Coordinates (Yadong County government): 27°29′10″N 88°54′26″E
- Country: China
- Autonomous region: Tibet
- Prefecture-level city: Shigatse
- County seat: Shasima (Yatung)

Area
  - Total: 4,240.14 km^{2} (1,637.13 sq mi)

Population (2020)
  - Total: 15,449
  - Density: 3.6435/km^{2} (9.4367/sq mi)
- Time zone: UTC+8 (China Standard)
- Website: www.ydx.gov.cn

Yadong County (Chinese: 亚东县; pinyin: Yàdōng xiàn), also known by its Tibetan name Dromo/Tromo County (Tibetan: གྲོ་མོ་རྫོང, Wylie: gro mo rdzong, THL: dro mo dzong, ZWPY: Chomo Zong) is a frontier county and trade-market of the Tibet Autonomous Region of China, part of its Shigatse Prefecture.

Yadong County is coextensive with the Chumbi valley that extends south into the Himalayas between Sikkim and Bhutan. It shares boundaries with both India and Bhutan. It covers about 4,306 square kilometers with a population of 10,000. Its headquarters is Yatung (also called Shasima).

== Geography ==
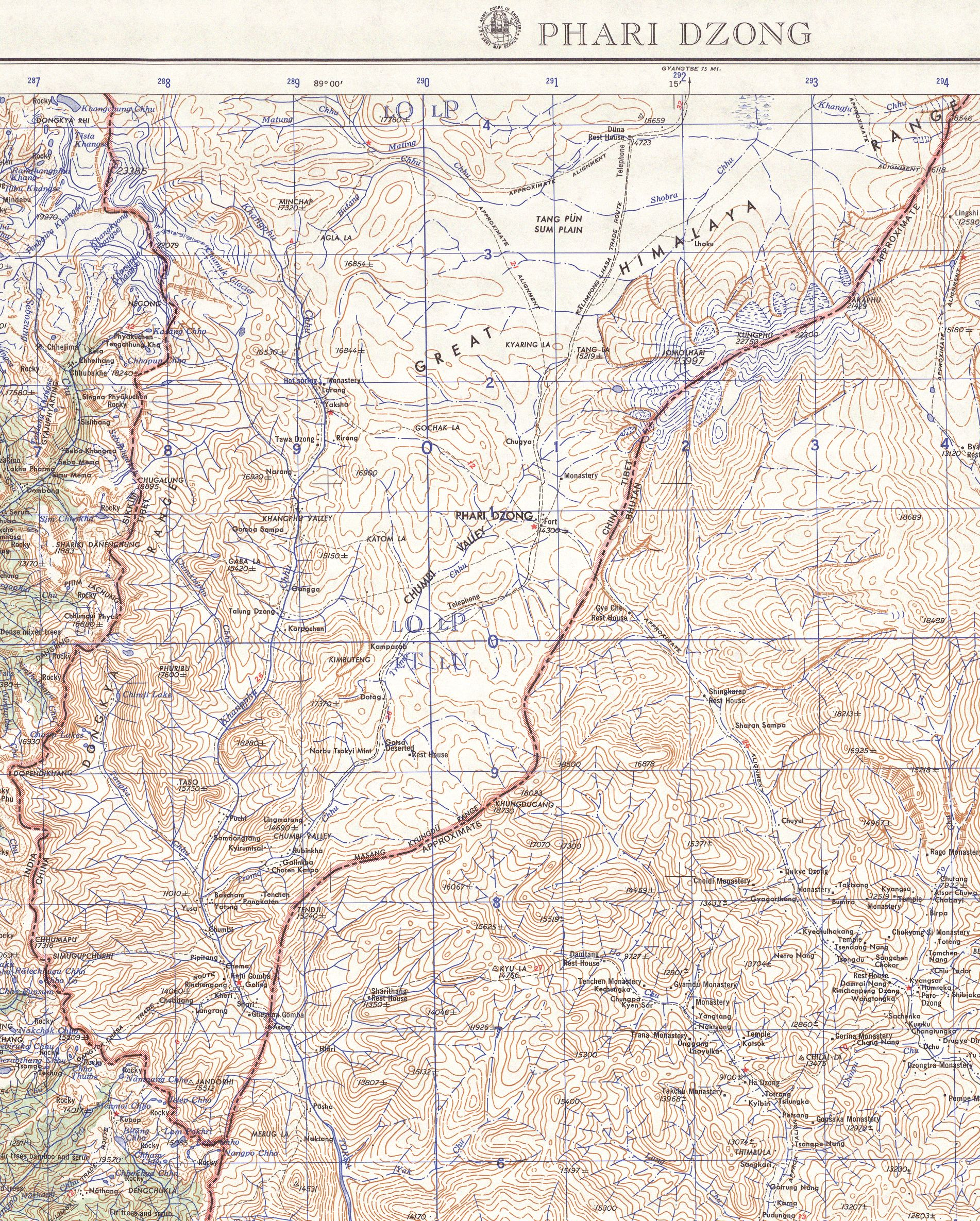
Map showing the Chumbi Valley (US Army Map Service, 1955)

Yadong County

Chinese name
- Simplified Chinese: 亚东县
- Traditional Chinese: 亞東縣
Transcriptions
Standard Mandarin
- Hanyu Pinyin: Yàdōng Xiàn
- Wade–Giles: Ya-tung xian

Alternative Chinese name
- Simplified Chinese: 卓木县
- Traditional Chinese: 卓木縣
Transcriptions
Standard Mandarin
- Hanyu Pinyin: Zhuōmù Xiàn

Second alternative Chinese name
- Simplified Chinese: 绰莫县
- Traditional Chinese: 綽莫縣
Transcriptions
Standard Mandarin
- Hanyu Pinyin: Chuòmò Xiàn

Tibetan name
- Tibetan: གྲོ་མོ་རྫོང༌།
Transcriptions
- Wylie: gro mo rdzong
- THL: dro mo dzong
- Tibetan Pinyin: Chomo Zong

The Yadong County mainly consists of the Chumbi Valley, called Dromo/Tromo in Tibetan. The valley is bordered by Dongkya Range in the west and Massong-Chungdung range in the east. (See map.) Two rivers Khambu Machu and Tromo Chu arise within the valley and join at the town of Yatung. The joint river is known in English by its Bhutanese name Amo Chu. (Tibetans continue to call it Khambu Machu.)

The town of Yatung (also called Shasima), is the headquarters of the county. It is close to the borders of both the Indian state of Sikkim and also Bhutan. In 1986, it was reported to have had a hotel, a guest house, some government offices and army barracks. Yadong is connected to the Indian state of Sikkim via the Nathu La pass.

Local specialities include Dromo fish and barley wine while the main tourist sites are Donggar Monastery, Kagyu Monastery and Khangbu Hotspring.

As part of the China Western Development strategy, the Chinese government planned to extend the Qinghai–Tibet Railway from Lhasa to Yatung.

== History ==
According to the Convention of Calcutta of 1890–94 signed by Great Britain and Qing dynasty China, the market at Old Yatung was opened to India in the valley coming down from the Jelep La pass. At that time there was a wall-like structure across the valley's stream extending part way up each side of the valley thus blocking the road to the interior of the county. This was a demarcation line that the British subjects were forbidden to cross. It was manned by 20 Tibetan soldiers under a sergeant along with three Chinese officials. The construction of the wall was reported to be one of the reasons that led to the British expedition to Tibet in 1904. According to the resulting Convention of Lhasa, a British trade-agent was to be stationed at "Yatung". The British picked the location of the present Yatung town for the trade agency. (Two more trade agencies were also located at Gyantse and Gartok as part of the same Convention.)

== Administrative divisions ==
Yadong County administers the following two towns and five townships:

Name	Chinese	Hanyu Pinyin	Tibetan	Wylie
Towns
Shasima Town (Yatung)	下司马镇	Xiàsīmǎ zhèn	ཤར་གསིང་མ་གྲོང་རྡལ།	shar gsing ma grong rdal
Phari Town	帕里镇	Pàlǐ zhèn	ཕག་རི་གྲོང་རྡལ།	phag ri grong rdal
Townships
Dromomey Township (Xiayadong, Xia Yadong, Lower Yadong)	下亚东乡	Xiàyàdōng xiāng	གྲོ་མོ་སྨད་ཤང་།	gro mo smad shang
Dromotod Township (Shangyadong, Shang Yadong, Upper Yadong)	上亚东乡	Shàngyàdōng xiāng	གྲོ་མོ་སྟོད་ཤང་།	gro mo stod shang
Khambu Township	康布乡	Kāngbù xiāng	ཁམ་བུ་ཤང་།	kham pu shang
Tuna Township	堆纳乡	Duīnà xiāng	དུད་སྣ་ཤང་།	dud sna shang
Jiru Township	吉汝乡	Jírǔ xiāng	སྒེར་རུ་ཤང་།	sger ru shang

== Climate ==
Climate data for Yadong, elevation 2,985 m (9,793 ft)
Month	Jan	Feb	Mar	Apr	May	Jun	Jul	Aug	Sep	Oct	Nov	Dec	Year
Mean daily maximum °C (°F)	7.8 (46.0)	8.8 (47.8)	12.1 (53.8)	15.0 (59.0)	17.2 (63.0)	18.2 (64.8)	19.3 (66.7)	18.8 (65.8)	17.7 (63.9)	15.6 (60.1)	11.6 (52.9)	8.8 (47.8)	14.2 (57.6)
Daily mean °C (°F)	0.0 (32.0)	1.3 (34.3)	4.4 (39.9)	8.0 (46.4)	11.1 (52.0)	13.6 (56.5)	15.0 (59.0)	14.3 (57.7)	13.0 (55.4)	8.8 (47.8)	4.1 (39.4)	1.1 (34.0)	7.9 (46.2)
Mean daily minimum °C (°F)	−7.9 (17.8)	−6.1 (21.0)	−3.3 (26.1)	1.1 (34.0)	5.0 (41.0)	8.8 (47.8)	10.6 (51.1)	10.0 (50.0)	8.3 (46.9)	2.2 (36.0)	−3.3 (26.1)	−6.7 (19.9)	1.6 (34.8)
Average precipitation mm (inches)	15.0 (0.59)	48.0 (1.89)	63.0 (2.48)	99.0 (3.90)	107.0 (4.21)	119.0 (4.69)	130.0 (5.12)	117.0 (4.61)	102.0 (4.02)	53.0 (2.09)	18.0 (0.71)	5.0 (0.20)	876 (34.51)
Source: FAO

== See also ==
- List of towns and villages in Tibet
- Dochen Tso
