= Díchu =

First convert of Saint Patrick

Saint Díchu mac Trichim
- Feast: 29 April

Saint Díchu mac Trichim was the first convert of Saint Patrick in Ireland. His feast is noted in the Martyrology of Donegal as "Diochu of Sabhall", under date of 29 April.

== See also ==
- Herbermann, Charles, ed. (1913). "St. Dichu". Catholic Encyclopedia. New York: Robert Appleton Company.
