= Convention of Calcutta =

Convention Between Great Britain and China Relating to Sikkim and Tibet

The Convention of Calcutta or Anglo-Chinese Convention of 1890, officially the Convention Between Great Britain and China Relating to Sikkim and Tibet, (Chinese: 中英藏印條約; pinyin: Zhōng yīng zàng yìn tiáoyuē; lit. 'Convention Between Great Britain and China Regarding Tibet and India') was a treaty between Britain and Qing China relating to Tibet and the Kingdom of Sikkim. It was signed by Viceroy of India Lord Lansdowne and the Chinese Amban in Tibet, Sheng Tai, on 17 March 1890 in Calcutta, India. The Convention recognized a British protectorate over Sikkim and demarcated the Sikkim–Tibet border.

China is said to have negotiated the treaty without consulting Tibet, and the Tibetans refused to recognize it. China's inability to deliver on the treaty eventually necessitated a British expedition to Tibet in 1904, setting in motion a long chain of developments in the history of Tibet. Modern international law jurists state that the convention exposed the Chinese 'impotence' in Tibet.

The boundary established between Sikkim and Tibet in the treaty still survives today, as part of the China–India border. It has an impact on the modern day Doklam dispute between China, India and Bhutan.

== Background ==
The British imperative in North East India was to open the markets of Tibet and by extension China to their manufactured textiles, tobacco, grain, tools and tea.

In 1876, the signing of the Chefoo Convention granted the United Kingdom the right to send missions to Tibet for exploration purposes. However, the Tibetan Kashag strongly opposed British activities in Tibet and maintained a military presence along the Tibetan-Sikkim border in Lintu, leading to the cancellation of the Macaulay Mission in 1885. The British government repeatedly issued protests to the Qing government, asserting that Lintu was located within Sikkim territory and accusing the Tibetan forces stationed at Lintu of 'border encroachment.' The Qing government pressured the Tibetans to withdraw, but without success.

After the negotiations between British India and Tibet to remove the Longtu outpost failed in 1888, the British army launched the Sikkim Expedition in March to expel Tibetan Army stationed in Sikkim. The Tibetan forces were then defeated, and Britain demanded that the Qing government sign a treaty to end the war. The Qing government appointed the Assistant Minister to Tibet, Sheng Tai, to travel to Calcutta, India, on March 17, 1890, where he signed the convention with Lord Lansdowne.

== Provisions ==
Under Article 1, the boundary of Sikkim and Tibet was defined as the crest of the mountain range separating the waters flowing into the Teesta River in Sikkim and its tributaries from the waters flowing into the Tibetan Mochu River and northwards into other rivers of Tibet. The line commenced at Mount Gipmochi on the Bhutan frontier, and followed the above watershed to the point where it met Nepali territory.

== Aftermath ==
A protocol was added to the original convention in December 1893. "Regulations Regarding Trade, Communications, and Pasturage to Be Appended to the Sikkim-Tibet Convention of 1890" allowed for the establishment of a British trading post in Old Yatung, Tibet as well as laid down regulations concerning pasturage and communication.

The 1904 Convention of Lhasa states "The Government of Thibet engages to respect the Anglo-Chinese Convention of 1890 and to recognize the frontier between Sikkim and Thibet, as defined in Article I of the said Convention, and to erect boundary pillars accordingly."

== Bibliography ==
- The Question of Tibet and the Rule of Law (PDF), Geneva: International Commission of Jurists, 1959
- Younghusband, Francis (1910). India and Tibet: a history of the relations which have subsisted between the two countries from the time of Warren Hastings to 1910; with a particular account of the mission to Lhasa of 1904. London: John Murray.
- Norbu, Dawa (2001), China's Tibet Policy, Routledge, ISBN 978-1-136-79793-4
- Prescott, John Robert Victor (1975). Map of Mainland Asia by Treaty. Melbourne University Press. ISBN 978-0-522-84083-4.
