= Chumbi Valley =

Valley in Yadong County, Tibet, China

- Dromo, Tromo, Jumo
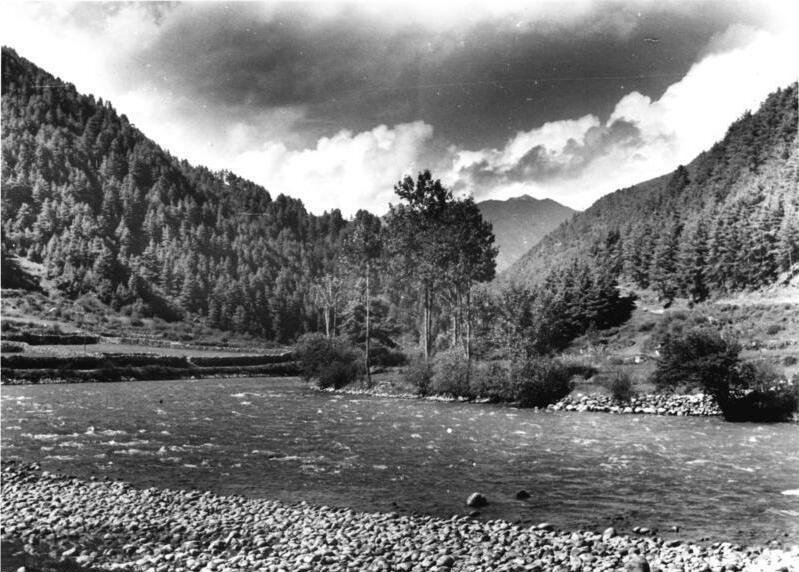
- Chumbi Valley, 1938.

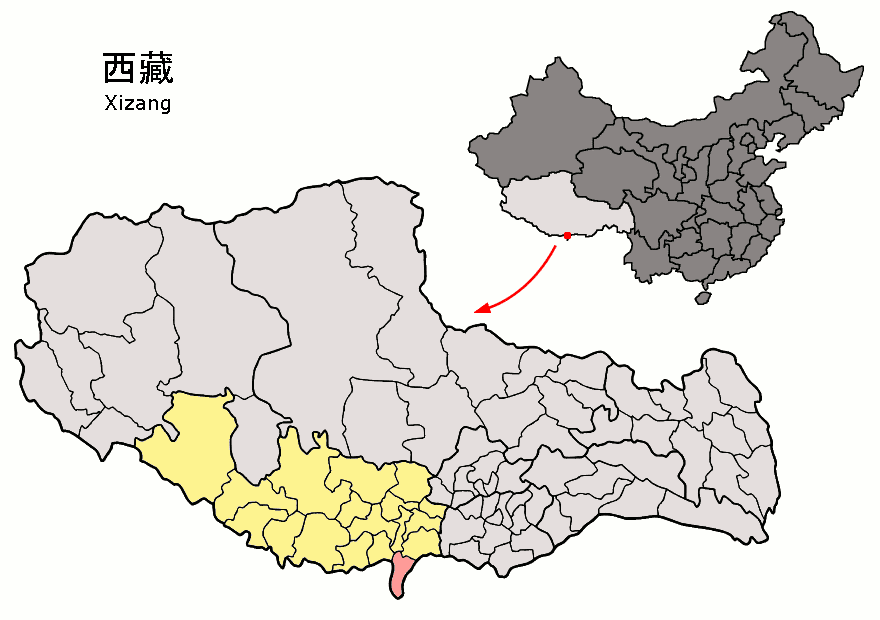
- Floor elevation: 3,000 m (9,800 ft)
- Long-axis direction: north-south

Naming
- Native name: གྲོ་མོ (Standard Tibetan)

Geography
- Location: North Eastern Region, India
- Population centers: Phari, Yatung
- Rivers: Amo Chhu

Chumbi Valley
- Chinese: 春丕河谷
Transcriptions
Standard Mandarin
- Hanyu Pinyin: Chūnpī Hégǔ

The Chumbi Valley, called Dromo or Tromo in Tibetan, is a valley in the Himalayas that projects southwards from the Tibetan plateau, intervening between Sikkim and Bhutan. It is coextensive with the administrative unit Yadong County in the Tibet Autonomous Region of China. The Chumbi Valley is connected to Sikkim to the southwest via the mountain passes of Nathu La and Jelep La.

The valley is at an altitude of 3,000 m (9,800 ft), and being on the south side of the Himalayas, enjoys a wetter and more temperate climate than most of Tibet. The valley supports some vegetation in the form of the Eastern Himalayan broadleaf forests and transitions to the Eastern Himalayan alpine shrub and meadows in the north. The plant Pedicularis chumbica (春丕马先蒿) is named after the valley.

The 1904 Younghusband Expedition of British India passed through the Chumbi Vally on its way to Lhasa. At the end of the expedition, the British took control of the Chumbi Valley in lieu of a war indemnity. China agreed to pay the indemnity owed by the Tibetans in three installments and the Chumbi Valley was transferred back to Tibet on 8 February 1908.

== Name ==
The Tibetan name of the region is spelt Gromo (Tibetan: ་གྲོ་མོ, Wylie: gro mo, THL: dro mo, ZWPY: chomo) and pronounced Dromo or Tromo.

In the Dzongkha language of Bhutan, the name is apparently written Gyumo and pronounced J'umo. J'umbi is said to be its adjective, meaning "of or pertaining to [J'umo]". Linguist George van Driem states that "Chumbi" is a derivative of J'umbi.

The term "Chumbi" to describe the region first appeared in the writings of Joseph Dalton Hooker, the first European to write about the region. Some sources specialising in Tibet translate "Chumbi Valley" as Lho Dromo (Tibetan: ལྷོ་གྲོ་མོ, Wylie: Lho gro mo, THL: lho dro mo), or southern Dromo, implying that the northern part of the valley around Phari is not referred to by the name of Chumbi by the Tibetans. In the English usage, however, "Chumbi Valley" refers to both the parts.

"Chumbi" is also the name of the most prominent town in the southern part of the valley. Some English writers claim that "Chumbi Valley" is named after the town, but there is no such indication in Hooker's writings.

== Geography ==
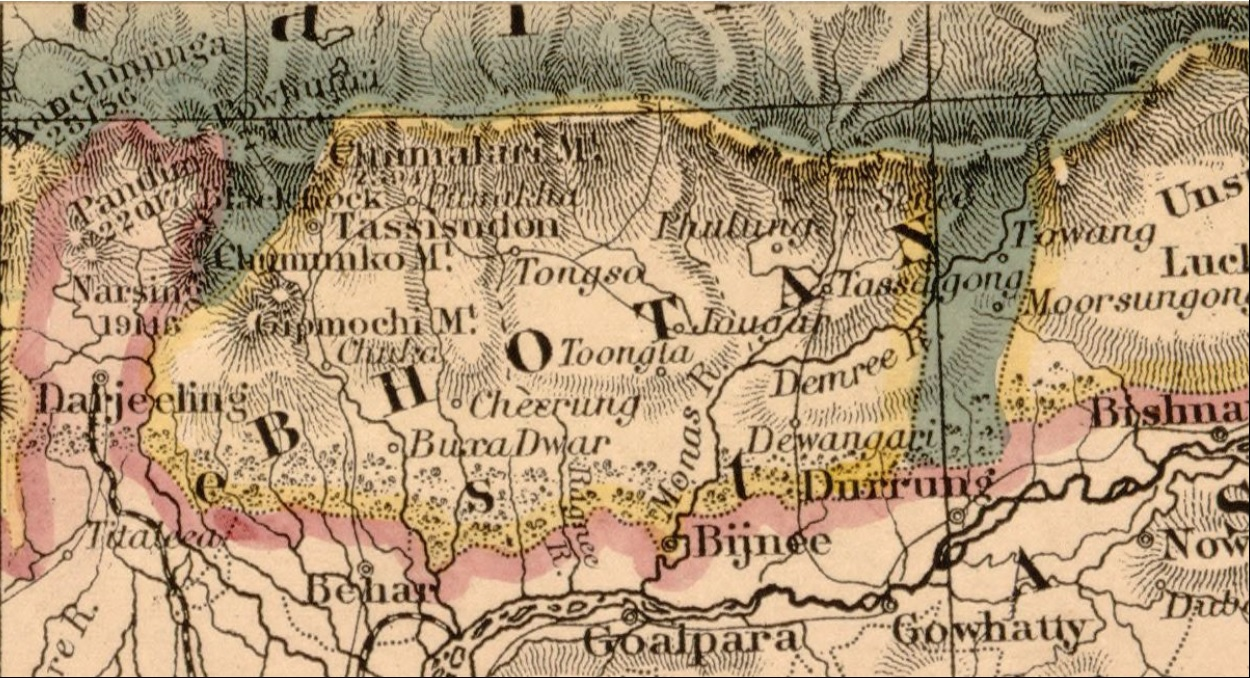
Section of 1888 map of the Empire of China by Edward Stanford showing the Chumbi Valley to the west of Bhutan.

Joseph Dalton Hooker described the Chumbi Valley as a triangular region with the broader opening to the north. It was said to be bounded on the west by the Chola Range upto "Gipmochi", (Note: "Gipmochi" (Gyemochen) appears prominently in Hooker's writings because its location and height had been known to him, measured earlier by the Survey of India through trigonometric methods from Darjeeling. Hooker himself did not visit Gipmochi. See the page on Gipmochi.) and the "Kamphee or Chakoong range" on the east, which he believed to be continuous with "Chumulari" (Chomolhari). These names do not appear in later literature, but maps in mid-20th century mark the eastern border as the "Masang Kyungdu Range" (Map 2), with the Khundugang peak (27.5438°N 89.1159°E) as its second prominent peak (after Chomolhari).

The Chumbi valley, belonging to Tibet (now part of PRC), is sandwiched between two Himalayan states: Sikkim to the west and Bhutan to the east. Sikkim and Bhutan are considered part of the Indian subcontinent or South Asia, with Sikkim now integrated as a state of India.

=== Strategic significance ===
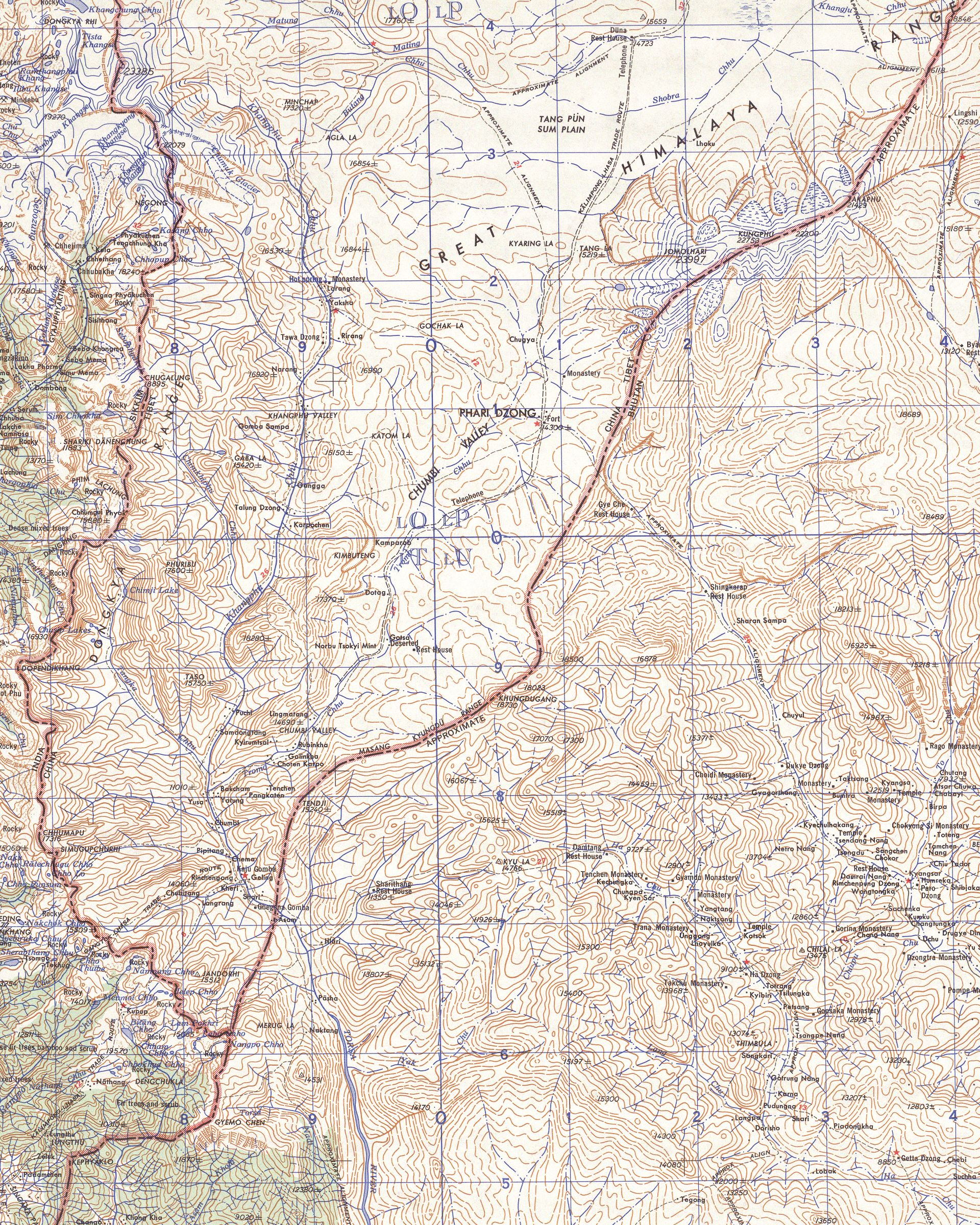
Map of Chumbi Valley (Army Map Service, 1955)

Scholar Susan Walcott counts China's Chumbi Valley and India's Siliguri Corridor to its south among "strategic mountain chokepoints critical in global power competition". John Garver has called the Chumbi Valley "the single most strategically important piece of real estate in the entire Himalayan region". The Chumbi Valley intervenes between Sikkim and Bhutan south of the high Himalayas, pointing towards India's Siliguri Corridor like a "dagger". The latter is a narrow 24 kilometer-wide corridor between Nepal and Bangladesh in India's West Bengal state, which connects the central parts of India with the northeastern states including the contested state of Arunachal Pradesh. Often referred to as the "chicken's neck", the Siliguri Corridor represents a strategic vulnerability for India. It is also of key strategic significance to Bhutan, containing the main supply routes into the country.

Historically, both Siliguri and Chumbi Valley were part of a highway of trade between India and Tibet. In the 19th century, the British Indian government sought to open up the route to British trade, leading to their suzerainty over Sikkim with its strategic Nathu La and Jelep La passes into the Chumbi Valley. Following the Anglo-Chinese treaty of 1890 and Younghusband expedition, the British established trading posts at Yatung and Lhasa, along with military detachments to protect them. These trade relations continued till 1959, when the Chinese government terminated them.

=== Chinese military aims ===
Map of China showing Chumbi Valley as a part of the Tibet Autonomous Region (colored in red); Areas colored in orange are controlled by China but are disputed.

Indian intelligence officials state that China had been carrying out a steady military build-up in the Chumbi Valley, building many garrisons and converting the valley into a strong military base. In 1967, border clashes occurred at Nathu La and Cho La passes, when the Chinese contested the Indian demarcations of the border on the Dongkya range. In the ensuing artillery fire, states scholar Taylor Fravel, many Chinese fortifications were destroyed as the Indians controlled the high ground. In fact, the Chinese military is believed to be in a weak position in the Chumbi Valley because the Indian and Bhutanese forces control the heights surrounding the valley.

The desire for heights is thought to bring China to the Doklam plateau at the southern border of the Chumbi Valley. Indian security experts mention three strategic benefits to China from a control of the Doklam plateau. First, it gives it a commanding view of the Chumbi valley itself. Second, it outflanks the Indian defences in Sikkim which are currently oriented northeast towards the Dongkya range. Third, it overlooks the strategic Siliguri Corridor to the south. A claim to the Mount Gipmochi and the Zompelri ridge would bring the Chinese to the very edge of the Himalayas, from where the slopes descend into the southern foothills of Bhutan and India. From here, the Chinese would be able to monitor the Indian troop movements in the plains or launch an attack on the vital Siliguri corridor in the event of a war. To New Delhi, this represents a "strategic redline". Scholar Caroline Brassard states, "its strategic significance for the Indian military is obvious."

=== Chumbi Valley as China's vulnerability ===
While the Chumbi Valley is often cited as a "dagger" aimed at the Siliguri Corridor, many defense experts argue that the valley is, in fact, a Chinese military bottleneck or a point of vulnerability due to its geography: The 2017 Doklam standoff, which occurred at the tri-junction point south of the Chumbi Valley, was widely seen as a Chinese attempt to gain command of the Zompelri ridge, which would have provided them with a commanding view of the Chumbi Valley itself, thereby mitigating this inherent vulnerability.

- Terrain domination by India: The valley is narrow, with limited deployment space (approximately 25–30 km wide at Yatung), and is dominated by high ground controlled by India and Bhutan. The Indian Army controls the commanding heights along the Dongkya range in Sikkim, which flanks the Chumbi Valley from the west.
- Chinese vulnerability to firepower: The terrain advantage held by India means that Chinese forces operating within the valley are exposed and highly vulnerable to Indian artillery and long-range firepower. During the 1967 Nathu La and Cho La clashes, Indian forces controlling the heights were able to destroy numerous Chinese fortifications.
- Logistical constraints for China: While China has improved road and rail networks (like the Lhasa–Shigatse railway line) to the northern end of the valley, the narrow, rugged terrain at the southern end severely limits the large-scale, rapid maneuver of heavy military formations, making it a logistical bottleneck for any major offensive.

== History ==
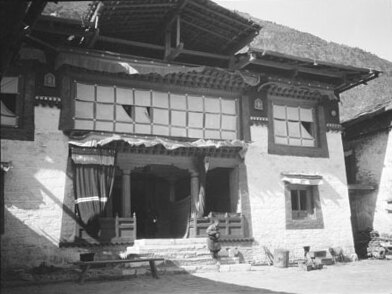
Dungkar Monastery, 6 miles to the north of Yatung. This is the entrance to the main shrine room with the house of the Abbot on the right. Photo taken 1 January 1927.

There is telltale evidence of the Chumbi Valley being used as a trade route between Tibet and India in the first millennium CE. A lotsawa named Yontendrak (Yon tan grags, b. 973) is said to have been given control over the road to India by an Indian teacher "Aryadeva".

The mention of this fact occurs in texts from the 14th century. A more graphic development is stated under the name of a Sakya governor Phakpa Balzang ('Phags-pa-dpal-bzang) in the mid-14th century, who is said to have invited 150 chiefs and teachers from Paro, Haa and other places for a feast in Phari and have them all killed. After this, these regions came under his control and he is said to have constructed a dzong and trade marts at Phari, appointing his younger brother Phakpa Rinchen (’Phags-pa-rin-chen) as the first district governor. There is no further mention of control over western Bhutan after this, but the Phari trade mart has persisted well into the 18th century.

In 1206 A.D, Bakhtiyar Khilji led an invasion of Tibet through the Chumbi Valley where he was defeated by the Tibetans and forced to retreat.

According to the Sikkimese tradition, when the Kingdom of Sikkim was founded in 1642, it included the Chumbi Valley, the Haa Valley to the east as well as the Darjeeling and Kalimpong areas to the south. During the 18th century, Sikkim faced repeated raids from Bhutan and these areas often changed hands. After a Bhutanese attack in 1780, a settlement was reached, which resulted in the transfer of the Haa valley and the Kalimpong area to Bhutan. The Doklam plateau sandwiched between these regions is likely to have been part of these territories. The Chumbi Valley was still said to have been under the control of Sikkim at this point.

Historians qualify this narrative, Saul Mullard states that the early kingdom of Sikkim was very much limited to the western part of modern Sikkim. The eastern part was under the control of independent chiefs, who did face border conflicts with the Bhutanese, losing the Kalimpong area. The possession of the Chumbi Valley by the Sikkimese is uncertain, but the Tibetans are known to have fended off Bhutanese incursions there.

After the unification of Nepal under the Gorkhas in 1756, Nepal and Bhutan had coordinated their attacks on Sikkim. Bhutan was eliminated from the contest by an Anglo-Bhutanese treaty in 1774. Tibet enforced a settlement between Sikkim and Nepal, which is said to have irked Nepal. Following this, by 1788, Nepal occupied all of the Sikkim areas to the west of the Teesta river as well as four provinces of Tibet. Tibet eventually sought the help of China, resulting in the Sino-Nepalese War of 1792. This proved to be a decisive entry of China into the Himalayan politics. The victorious Chinese General ordered a land survey, in the process of which the Chumbi valley was declared as part of Tibet. The Sikkimese resented the losses forced on them in the aftermath of the war.

In the following decades, Sikkim established relations with the British East India Company and regained some of its lost territory after an Anglo-Nepalese War. However, the relations with the British remained rocky and the Sikkimese retained loyalties to Tibet. The British attempted to enforce their suzerainty via the Treaty of Tumlong in 1861. In 1890, they sought to exclude the Tibetans from Sikkim by establishing a treaty with the Chinese, who were presumed to be exercising suzerainty over Tibet. The Anglo-Chinese treaty recognised Sikkim as a British protectorate and defined the border between Sikkim and Tibet as the northern watershed of the Teesta River (on the Dongkya range), starting at "Mount Gipmochi". In 1904, the British signed another treaty with Tibet, which confirmed the terms of the Anglo-Chinese treaty. The boundary established between Sikkim and Tibet in the treaty still survives today, according to scholar John Prescott.

== See also ==
- Siliguri Corridor
- Nathu La and Cho La clashes

== Bibliography ==
Scholarly sources

- Ardussi, John Albert (1977), Bhutan before the British: A historical study, Australian National University, doi:10.25911/5d74e29e9f60e, hdl:1885/11280
- Bajpai, G. S. (1999), China's Shadow Over Sikkim: The Politics of Intimidation, Lancer Publishers, ISBN 978-1-897829-52-3
- Chandran, D. Suba; Singh, Bhavna (2015), India, China and Sub-regional Connectivities in South Asia, SAGE Publications, ISBN 978-93-5150-326-2
- Fravel, M. Taylor (2008), Strong Borders, Secure Nation: Cooperation and Conflict in China's Territorial Disputes, Princeton University Press, ISBN 978-1-4008-2887-6
- Garver, John W. (2011), Protracted Contest: Sino-Indian Rivalry in the Twentieth Century, University of Washington Press, ISBN 978-0-295-80120-9
- Great Britain. Foreign Office (1904), "No. 226", East India (Tibet): Papers Relating to Tibet and Further Papers ..., Issues 2-4, London: H.M. Stationery Office
- Harris, George L. (1977) [first published by American University, 1964], Area Handbook for Nepal, Bhutan and Sikkim (second ed.), U.S. Government Printing Office
- Hooker, Joseph Dalton (1854), Himalayan Journals – Notes of a Naturalist in Bengal, the Sikkim and Nepal Himalayas, the Khasia Mountains etc., Vol. 2, London: John Murray – via archive.org
- Joshi, Manoj (2017), Doklam: To start at the very beginning, Observer Research Foundation
- Karan, Pradyumna P. (1967), Bhutan: A Physical and Cultural Geography, University of Kentucky Press, LCCN 67-17842 – via archive.org
- Kumar, Pranav; Acharya, Alka; Jacob, Jabin T. (2011). "Sino-Bhutanese Relations". China Report. 46 (3): 243–252. doi:10.1177/000944551104600306. ISSN 0009-4455. S2CID 153382221.
- Maes, Janny (cartographer); Zeijlstra, Bert (cartographer) (2000), The Complete World Atlas, Osterbeek, The Netherlands: Rebo International, p. 256, ISBN 1931040028 – via archive.org
- Mathou, Thierry (2004), "Bhutan–China Relations: Towards a New step in Himalayan Politics" (PDF), The Spider and The Piglet: Proceedings of the First International Seminar on Bhutanese Studies, Thimpu: The Centre for Bhutan Studies
- McKay, Alex (2013), Pilgrimage in Tibet, Taylor & Francis, ISBN 978-1-136-80716-9
- Mullard, Saul (2011), Opening the Hidden Land: State Formation and the Construction of Sikkimese History, BRILL, ISBN 978-90-04-20895-7
- Penjore, Dorji (2004), "Security of Bhutan: walking between the giants" (PDF), Journal of Bhutan Studies
- Phuntsho, Karma (2013), The History of Bhutan, Random House India, ISBN 978-81-8400-411-3
- Powers, John; Templeman, David (2012), Historical Dictionary of Tibet, Scarecrow Press, ISBN 978-0-8108-7984-3
- Prescott, John Robert Victor (1975), Map of Mainland Asia by Treaty, Melbourne University Press, ISBN 978-0-522-84083-4
- Rose, Leo E. (1971), Nepal – Strategy for Survival, University of California Press, ISBN 978-0-520-01643-9
- Shakabpa, Tsepon Wangchuk Deden (1984) [first published Yale University Press 1967], Tibet: A Political History, New York: Potala Publications, ISBN 978-0-9611474-0-2
- Singh, Mandip (2013), Critical Assessment of China's Vulnerabilities in Tibet (PDF), Institute for Defence Studies & Analyses, ISBN 978-93-82169-10-9
- Smith, Paul J. (2015), "Bhutan–China Border Disputes and Their Geopolitical Implications", in Bruce Elleman; Stephen Kotkin; Clive Schofield (eds.), Beijing's Power and China's Borders: Twenty Neighbors in Asia, M.E. Sharpe, pp. 23–36, ISBN 978-0-7656-2766-7
- Van Driem, George (2015), "Endangered Languages of South Asia", in Matthias Brenzinger (ed.), Language Diversity Endangered, Walter de Gruyter GmbH & Co, ISBN 9783110905694
- Van Praagh, David (2003), Greater Game: India's Race with Destiny and China, McGill-Queen's Press - MQUP, pp. 349–, ISBN 978-0-7735-7130-3
- Waddell, L. Austin (1905), Lhasa and its Mysteries, London: John Murray – via archive.org
- Walcott, Susan M. (2010), "Bordering the Eastern Himalaya: Boundaries, Passes, Power Contestations" (PDF), Geopolitics, 15: 62–81, doi:10.1080/14650040903420396, S2CID 144252954

Primary sources

- Bell, Charles (1992) [1927], Tibet Past and Present, Motilal Banarsidass Publ., ISBN 978-81-208-1048-8
- China Foreign Ministry (2 August 2017), The Facts and China's Position Concerning the Indian Border Troops' Crossing of the China-India Boundary in the Sikkim Sector into the Chinese Territory (2017-08-02) (PDF), Government of China
- India. Ministry of External Affairs (1966), Notes, Memoranda and Letters Exchanged Between the Governments of India and China, January 1965–February 1966, White Paper No. XII (PDF)
- India. Ministry of External Affairs (1967), Notes, Memoranda and Letters Exchanged Between the Governments of India and China, February 1966–February 1967, White Paper No. XIII (PDF)
- India. Ministry of External Affairs (1968), Notes, Memoranda and Letters Exchanged Between the Governments of India and China, February 1967–April 1968, White Paper No. XIV (PDF)
