= Jelep La =

Mountain pass between Sikkim, India and Tibet

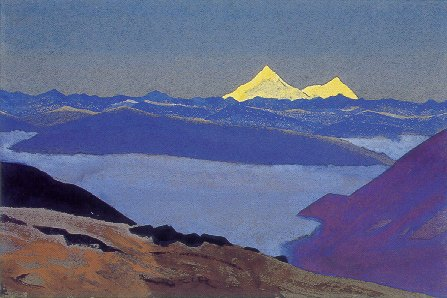
- Jelep La Tibetan Frontier by Nicholas Roerich

- Location within Sikkim Location within Tibet
- Elevation: 15,790 ft (4,810 m)

Location
- Location: Sikkim, India – Tibet, China
- Range: Himalaya
- Coordinates: 27°22′02″N 88°51′57″E

Jelep La
- Traditional Chinese: 則里拉山口
- Simplified Chinese: 则里拉山口
Transcriptions
Standard Mandarin
- Hanyu Pinyin: zélǐlā shānkǒu

Jelep La (Note: Alternative spellings include Jelap La and Dzalep La. Older British spellings are Jeylap and Jyelap.) (Tibetan: རྫི་ལི་ལ, Wylie: rdzi li la, THL: dzi li la; Chinese: 则里拉山口; pinyin: Zé lǐlā shānkǒu) elevation 15,800 feet (4,800 m), is a high mountain pass between Sikkim, India and Tibet Autonomous Region, China. It is on a route that connects Lhasa to India. The pass is about 4 km (2.5 mi) south of Nathu La and is slightly higher. It was frequently used for trade between Tibet and India during the British Raj, with Kalimpong serving as the contact point. The Menmecho Lake lies below the Jelep La.

== Name ==
According to the Bengal District Gazetteer, Jelep-la, a Tibetan name, means "The lovely level pass, so called because it is the easiest and most level of all the passes between Tibet and Sikkim."

According to scholar Alex Mckay, the Tibetan name is actually Wylie: rdzi-li-la, which would mean a "shepherd's bronze pass".

== Geography ==
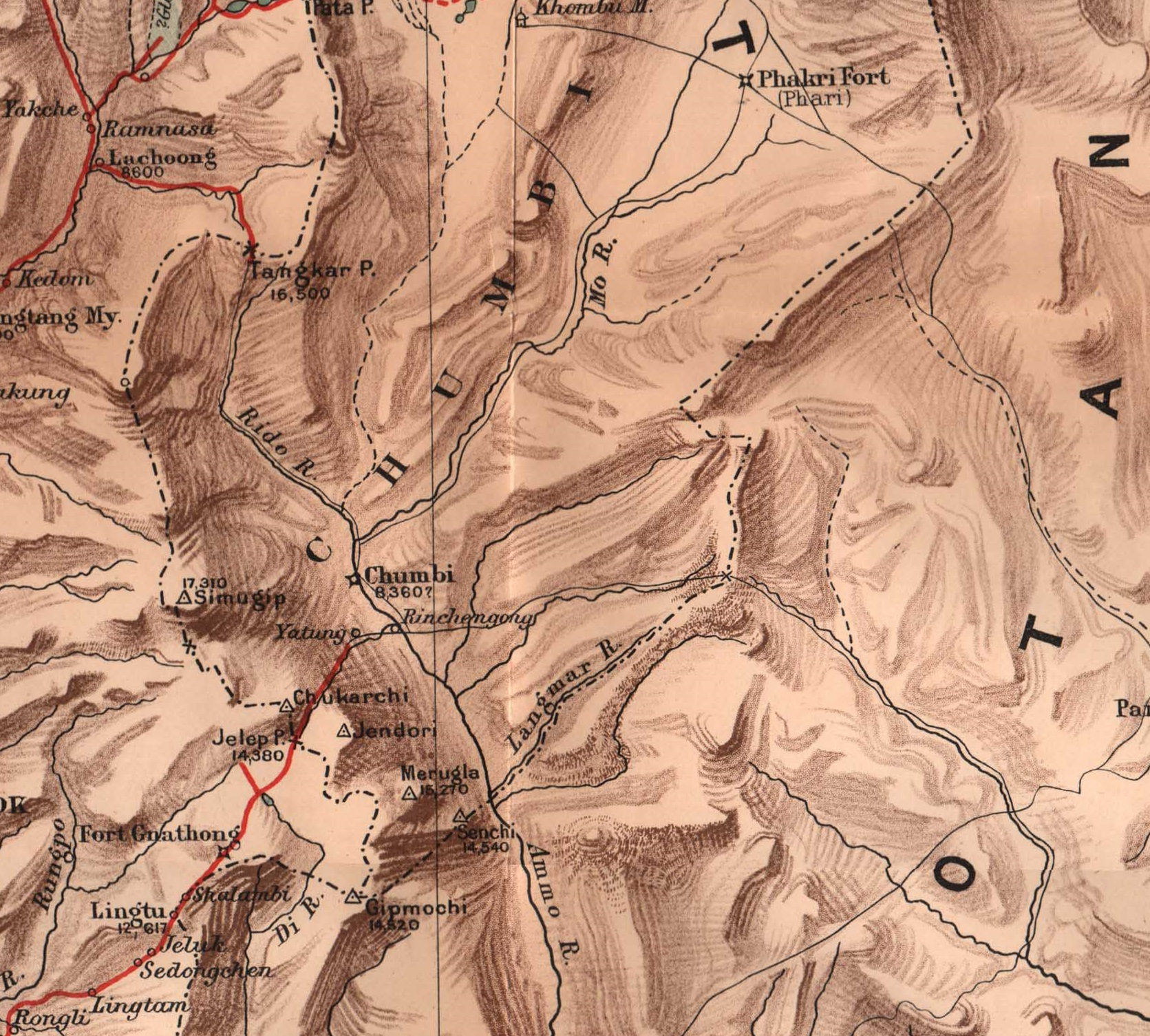
Map of the Indo-Tibetan trade route through Jelep La (marked in red), 1898

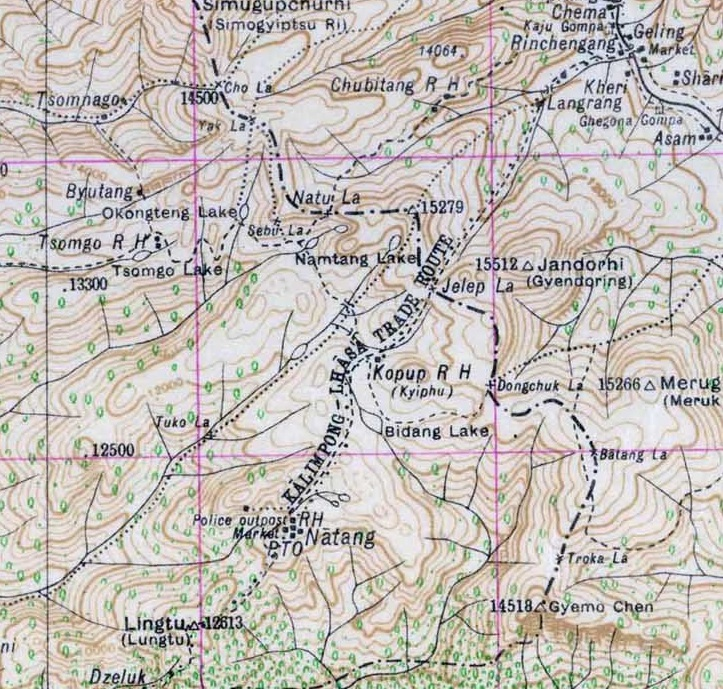
Jelep La trade route (Survey of India, 1937)

On the Indian side there are two routes to Jelep La, one through Gangtok and the other through Kalimpong.

The Kalimpong route boosted the local economies due to the trading of wool and furs during the 20th century. It passes through the towns of Rongli, Rhenock, Pedong, Algarah, in Sikkim and northern West Bengal.

The route from Gangtok passes through the towns of Sherathang, nearby Changu lake and alongside Nathu La and through Kupup.

The route is scenic with forests of rhododendrons blooming in spring. Numerous hamlets are scattered in the surrounding area. On the Tibetan side the pass leads to the Chumbi Valley of the Tibetan Plateau.

== History ==
=== 17th century ===
In the 17th century, Jelep La might have been under the control of an eastern Sikkimese Lepcha kingdom based at Damsang (Wylie: dam bzang rdzong), ruled by a Lepcha chieftain Gyalpo Ajok (Wylie: rgyal po A lcog; Lepcha: Gyabo Achuk). Ajok was allied with Tibet under the 5th Dalai Lama and was rivalled by Bhutan. In a war fought by Tibet and Damsang against Bhutan during 1675–79, Ajok captured a Bhutanese outpost at Dalingkot (Wylie: Brda gling). However, the Bhutanese recaptured the post and executed Ajok.

After this event, a major war erupted between Tibet and Bhutan, but Bhutan managed to repulse its much larger foe. The end result of the war is not entirely clear, but the Kalimpong area came under the control of Bhutan, and the present day East Sikkim, between Rhenock and Jelep La, might have come under the control of Tibet.

At the time of the Sino-Nepalese War, Sikkim lost much of its territory west of Teesta River to Nepal. Tibet apparently granted to Sikkim the present day East Sikkim region through unknown terms. By the time the British came on the scene, the area up to the Cho La–Jelep La range was under the control of Sikkim, and the Chumbi Valley beyond it was considered Tibet proper.

=== British Raj period ===
After the annexation of Kalimpong from Bhutan, the British started to constructing a cart road to Jelep La in 1884. This was viewed with some apprehension by the Tibetans and in 1886 a small Tibetan militia occupied the region around the pass. In May 1888, the Tibetans attacked the British but were warded off by a British Expeditionary Force. Later in September the same year the British regained control of the area around the pass.

With the growing Russian influence in Tibet, a British expedition was sent via Jelep La to Lhasa in 1904 led by Colonel Francis Younghusband. This expedition was met by hostile Tibetan forces which were defeated by the British. A trade agreement was then forced on the Tibetans in the absence of the 13th Dalai Lama, who had fled to Mongolia.

In 1910, to escape a Chinese invasion, the 13th Dalai Lama "accompanied by six ministers and a small escort" which included his close aide, diplomat and military figure Tsarong Dzasa, fled via Jelep La to Sikkim and Darjeeling, where he stayed almost two years. During this period he was invited to Calcutta by the Viceroy, Lord Minto, which helped to restore relations with the British.

=== Modern period ===
After India's independence in 1947, Sikkim, which was then a monarchy, agreed to a special protectorate status and gave India the status of a suzerain nation and its defence and foreign affairs were managed by India. After the Chinese invasion of Tibet in 1950 and suppression of the Tibetan uprising in 1959, the passes into Sikkim became a conduit for refugees from Tibet before being closed by the Chinese. During the 1962 Sino-Indian War, there were border skirmishes between the Indian and Chinese armed forces in and around the passes of Jelep La and Nathu La - this was despite Sikkim still being a separate Kingdom at that stage. After the war the two passes were closed.

Sikkim became a part of India in early 1975 following a referendum. With the recent thawing in relations between India and China, plans are afoot to reopen the Jelep La (following the July 6, 2006 reopening of the Nathu La).

== See also ==
- Sikkim expedition

== Notes ==
Notes

== Bibliography ==
- Edgar, John Ware (1874), Report on a visit to Sikhim and the Thibetan frontier in October, November, and December, 1873, Calcutta: Bengal Secretariat Press – via archive.org
- Harris, Tina (2013). Geographical Diversions: Tibetan Trade, Global Transactions. University of Georgia Press. ISBN 978-0-8203-4573-4.
- Brown, Percy (1934), Townsend, Joan (ed.), Tours in Sikhim and the Darjeeling District (Revised ed.), Calcutta: W. Newman & Co – via archive.org
- Mullard, Saul (2011), Opening the Hidden Land: State Formation and the Construction of Sikkimese History, BRILL, ISBN 978-90-04-20895-7
- Shakabpa, Tsepon Wangchuk Deden (1984) [first published Yale University Press 1967], Tibet: A Political History, New York: Potala Publications, ISBN 0-9611474-0-7
- Smith, W. W. (1913). Records of the Botanical Survey of India. Vol 6. No 7. The Alpine and Sub-Alpine Vegetation of South-East Sikkim. Superintendent Government Printing, India – via archive.org.
- Temple, Richard (June 1881), "The Lake Region of Sikkim, on the Frontier of Tibet", Proceedings of the Royal Geographical Society and Monthly Record of Geography, 3 (6): 321–340, doi:10.2307/1800507, JSTOR 1800507
