= 101st Grenadiers =

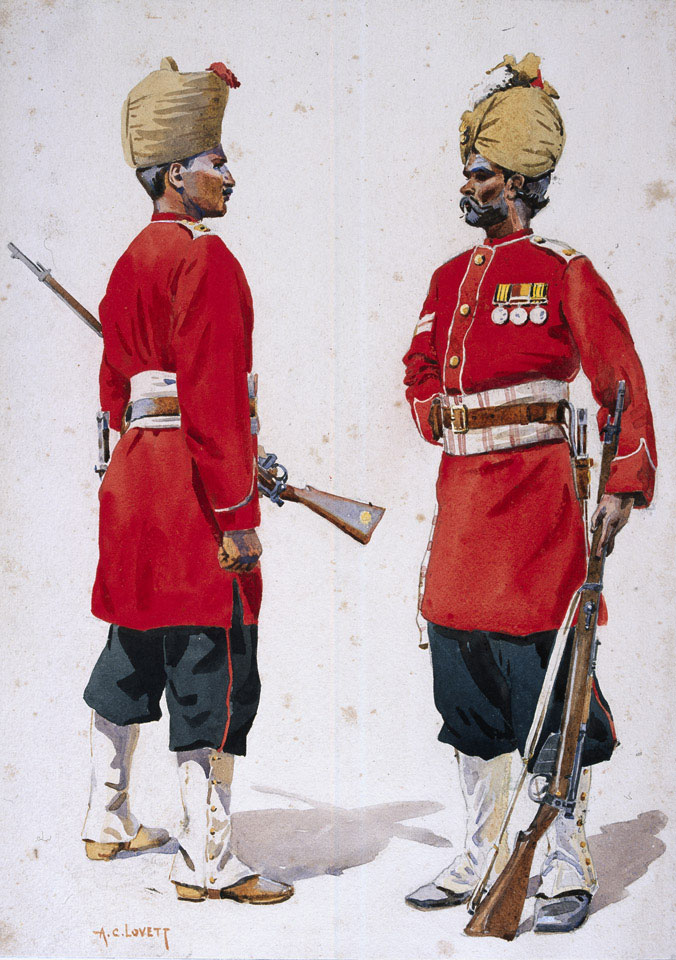
- Punjabi Musalman Naik of the 101st Grenadiers, 1908
- Active: 1778–1922
- Country: Indian Empire
- Branch: Army
- Type: Infantry
- Part of: Bombay Army (to 1895); Bombay Command
- Uniform: Red; faced white
- Engagements: Battle of Mangalore; Third Anglo-Mysore War; Battle of Hyderabad; Second Afghan War; Third Burmese War

The 101st Grenadiers was a regiment of the British Indian Army.

== 1778–1878 ==
The regiment was formed in 1778 after six grenadier companies (two companies each from the three battalions of the Bombay Army) were combined to form a composite battalion. During the First Mahratta War, the grenadier companies fought against the Mahratta Empire and was engaged in the Battle of Talegoan. In recognition of its conduct, the unit became a permanent unit, titled the 8th Regiment of Bombay Sepoys.

In 1783 the regiment's title was amended to become the 8th Grenadier Regiment of Bombay Sepoys, known informally as the Bombay Grenadiers. The regiment thus gained the claim to be the oldest grenadier regiment in the British Empire; the British Army's Grenadier Guards did not gain its Grenadier title until after the Battle of Waterloo in 1815.

Meanwhile, the Regiment took part in the numerous Mysore Wars. In 1783, the regiment formed part of the Mangalore garrison, which the Tipu Sultan's Mysore Army besieged. The garrison held out for nine months before negotiating a settlement which permitted it safe passage back to British territory. Its actions earned the regiment the battle honour "Mangalore". The regiment later gained the White Horse of Hanover, emblem of the Royal House of Hanover, as its cap badge. The regiment's second battle honour, "Mysore" for its involvement in the last of the Mysore wars, between 1789 and 1792.

The regiment raised a 2nd Battalion in 1793 and became the 1st Grenadier Regiment of Bombay Native Infantry. The 2nd Battalion would, in 1824, be separated from the 1st Grenadiers to become the 2nd Grenadier Regiment of Bombay Native Infantry (later the 102nd King Edward's Own Grenadiers). The regiment helped to besiege the fort of Bharatpur from December 1825 to its capture on 18 January 1826. In 1843, the 1st Grenadiers served in the Scinde War, being engaged at Hyderabad in March. The war's conclusion brought about the annexation of Scinde. The regiment was extensively employed during the First Anglo-Sikh War and was present at the decisive Battle of Sobraon in February 1846.

== The Second Afghan War ==
After the outbreak of the Second Afghan War, the Bombay Grenadiers found itself initially employed initially in the vicinity of the Bolan Pass. It was not until March 1880 that the battalion, commanded by Lieutenant-Colonel Horace Anderson, entered Afghanistan as an element of a British-Indian column intent on quelling a revolt by Ayub Khan, the ruler of Herat, who sought to depose the British-backed Amir of Afghanistan, Abdur Rahman Khan. At the Battle of Maiwand, on 27 July 1880, the Bombay Grenadiers and its column, under Brigadier George Burrows were attacked by an Afghan force of up to 25,000 men.

The British began the battle with an artillery barrage that the Afghans responded to via their own artillery at about 11:20 am; the Grenadiers were on the left flank of the British-Indian force and were in an exposed position that saw them take the brunt of the Afghan barrage, sustaining significant casualties. Shortly after noon, the Afghan infantry began the attack and the Grenadiers were heavily involved in the attempts to repulse the constant attacks, inflicting heavy casualties on the Afghans. At about 1:00 pm the Grenadiers confronted a large group of Afghans and at about 2:30 pm two companies of Jacob's Rifles, who had been positioned to the left of the Grenadiers, were attacked; they eventually wavered in the face of such an overwhelming force, straight into the ranks of the Grenadiers. The battery of the Royal Horse Artillery subsequently withdrew and the Grenadiers, as well as the rest of the Indian forces, fled towards the 66th Foot, the sole British infantry regiment present. The column's cavalry attempted to restore some stability to the situation but to no avail. Parts of the Grenadiers and Jacob's Rifles withdrew to Mahmudabad while the 66th Foot and the rest of the Grenadiers withdrew towards Khig; there, the 66th made a gallant last stand in a garden, fighting to the last man.

The battle had been a devastating defeat for the British-Indian forces: over 1,100 casualties had been sustained, but they had inflicted over 7,000 casualties upon the Afghan forces. The Grenadiers commanding officer (CO) was severely wounded during the battle and his life was saved by Risaldar Dhonkhul Singh of the 3rd Bombay Light Cavalry. The British-Indian survivors eventually made it back to British-held Kandahar. The city was soon besieged by Afghan rebels until a relief force, led by Major-General Roberts, arrived from the capital city, Kabul, on 31 August.

== Third Burmese War ==
In 1885 the Regiment took part in the Third Burmese War – the last war between the British and Burma. The war saw Upper Burma annexed and the end of Burmese independence. The Regiment gained its last Theatre Honour of the 19th Century for its involvement in the war, "Burma 1885–87".

== 20th century ==
In 1901 the Regiment deployed to the British territory of Aden (now part of the Yemen), also having its name changed to the 1st Grenadier Bombay Infantry. In 1903 the Regiment was renumbered to become the 101st Grenadiers. Elements of the Regiment saw service during operations in 1902–05 to quell belligerence by the Dervish state, led by their sultan Diiriye Guure. During operations in Somaliland, Captain George Murray Rolland won the Victoria Cross (VC) for his actions at Daratoleh on 22 April 1903. The operations against the 'Mad Mullah' did not conclude until 1905 with the signing of a peace agreement—the Mullah gained some territory in Italian Somaliland. The Mullah reneged on this agreement when he resumed hostilities against the British in 1907, and would continue to do so until 1920.

== First World War ==
The First World War began in August 1914, a war that pitted the British Empire, France and their Allies against Germany and its allies. During the conflict, the Regiment saw service in Africa and the Middle East. The 101st raised a 2nd Battalion in 1917 which saw service in Egypt; it was disbanded in 1921.

The Regiment took part in operations in German East Africa from the beginning of the campaign there in November 1914. There, the British encountered a formidable opponent in the form of Paul Erich von Lettow-Vorbeck. The 101st took part in the initial landings and the Battle of Tanga. This was a German victory, that saw the British and Indian forces, including the 101st, sustain significant casualties that compelled them to retreat to their ships. The 101st had however shown stubborn resistance when other units broke.

In January 1915, a company of the 101st took part in the Battle of Jassin that saw both sides sustain heavy casualties which compelled von Lettow-Vorbeck to avoid pitched battles with the British forces. Due to this defeat, the British garrison in Jassin surrendered, after no relief force had arrived, with nearly 300 British and Indians troops taken prisoner, including the company of the 101st, but were subsequently released on parole with the pledge that they would have no further participation in the war.

One company of the Regiment acted with the 5th Light Infantry in another attempt to capture Tanga in July 1916. The port—which had, for the most part, been abandoned—was, indeed, successfully captured. Some of von Lettow-Vorbeck's forces had remained to snipe at the Indian forces; these snipers proved to be quite a deadly nuisance that required intense patrolling to remove the threat. For the Regiment's involvement in the campaign it was awarded the Theatre Honour "East Africa 1914–16".

The 101st later saw service in the Middle East in the Palestine theatre – this theatre was the second largest, in terms of troop numbers, after the Western Front. Their opposition was the Ottoman Empire that controlled Palestine, and was an ally of Germany. The Regiment took part in the attempts to capture the important port of Gaza and by the end of December 1917 the Allies were in control of much of Palestine, including the symbolic capture of Jerusalem. In July 1918 the Regiment took part in the Ghurabeh raid that saw intense fighting and over 100 Ottomans taken prisoner. The Regiment later took part in the Megiddo Offensive – the World War I equivalent of the German Blitzkrieg during World War II – and took part in the attempts to capture Nablus. The Ottomans signed an Armistice with the Allies on 30 October. The First World War finally ended on 11 November 1918 with the signing of the Armistice between the Allies and Germany.

== Post-War ==
Soon after the war, the regiment deployed to British Somaliland, where operations against Hassan and his followers had resumed. The campaign, which encompassed the army, Royal Navy, and Royal Air Force, succeeded in defeating Hassan in 1920, after two decades of conflict.

In accordance with the Indian Army reforms of 1922, the 101st amalgamated with five other regiments to form six battalions of the 4th Bombay Grenadiers; the 101st became the 1st Battalion of the new regiment. The battalion had the distinction of being allowed to have its own cap badge. After Indian gained independence in 1947, the 4th Grenadiers were allocated to the Indian Army and retitled The Grenadiers. The Battalion which had once been the 101st transferred to the Brigade of the Guards in 1952, becoming its 2nd Battalion (2 Guards).

== Battle honours ==
- Mangalore, Mysore, Hyderabad, Kandahar 1880, Afghanistan 1878–80, Burma 1885–87, Somaliland 1901–04
- First World War:
  - Africa: East Africa 1914–16
  - Middle East: Egypt, Gaza, Megiddo, Nablus, Palestine 1917–18
