= Raghbir Singh Pathania =

Sardar Bahadur Raghbir Singh Pathania OBI
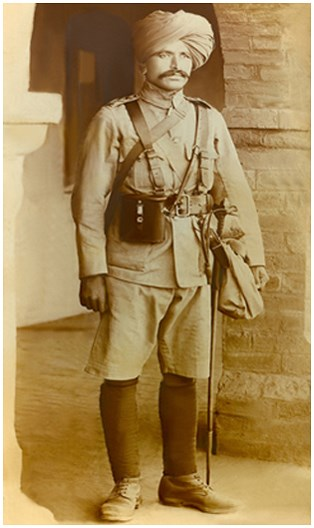
- Raghbir Singh Pathania in his military uniform
- Born: 1874; Kangra, Chamba State, British Raj
- Died: 18 January 1915 (aged 40 or 41); Jassin, German East Africa, German Empire
- Military career
- Allegiance: India
- Branch: British Indian Army
- Service years: ??? – 1915
- Rank: Lieutenant Colonel
- Commands: 2nd Jammu and Kashmir Rifles
- Conflicts: World War I; East African Campaign; Battle of Jassin †

Raghbir Singh Pathania (sometimes erroneously spelled Raghubir), OBI was an Indian Lieutenant colonel who was the primary commander of the 2nd Jammu and Kashmir Rifles during the Battle of Jassin, in which he was killed while defending a garrison of 4 Indian Brigades.

== Biography ==
=== Family ===
Raghbir was born on 1874 as the son of Nihal Singh Pathania and the older brother of Gandharb Singh. He was also a descendant of the Raja of the Nurpur kingdom, Fateh Singh. He would later have several children including Anant Singh Pathania on 25 May 1913.

=== Military career ===
He enlisted into military service at 2nd Jammu and Kashmir Rifles which consisted of Muslims and Gurkhas. He would attend the 1903 Delhi Durbar as a Major of the staff of the 5th Infantry Brigade of the 2nd Infantry Division. During his military career, he earned the title of Sardar Bahadur, being promoted to Commander-in-chief as well as earning the Order of British India. Along with the command of Lieutenant Colonel Durga Singh, Singh Pathania's leadership was seen as competent and reliable by the commander of Indian Expeditionary Force B, General Arthur Aitken. Upon the outbreak of World War I, the then Lieutenant Colonel Pathania was in charge of mobilizing the 2nd Kashmir Rifles from 12 to 15 September with the regiment leaving Jammu at the end of the month to meet up with the rest of the Imperial Service Infantry Brigade which was to be concentrated at Deolali by 1 October.

=== Battle of Jassin ===
After the outbreak of World War I, the British Indian Army were initially sent to the East African Campaign and the 2nd Jammu and Kashmir Rifles were a part of the divisions sent to German East Africa. On 18 January 1915, the Germans attacked the village of Jassin to secure Tanga which had successfully repelled an Anglo-Indian Invasion. The garrison of the town was a weak and meager force of around 4 brigades commanded by Pathania. The fighting would last for nine hours in an attempt to relieve the nearby Yasin Garrison but to no avail as the regiment would eventually run out of ammunition against a superior German force and would surrender. Pathania would then be killed in action which lead to the Germans capturing it. Pathania's services were recognized by the state government as they would grant a Jagir worth 400 Rupees per annum and around 50 acres of land to his family. Brigadier J. L. Rose would comment on Pathania's death, stating:

A glorious one falling as the head of his men fighting for his Chief, King and the Country.
