= Battle of Kilimanjaro =

Battle in former German East Africa during the First World War (1914)

- Part of the East African campaign of World War I
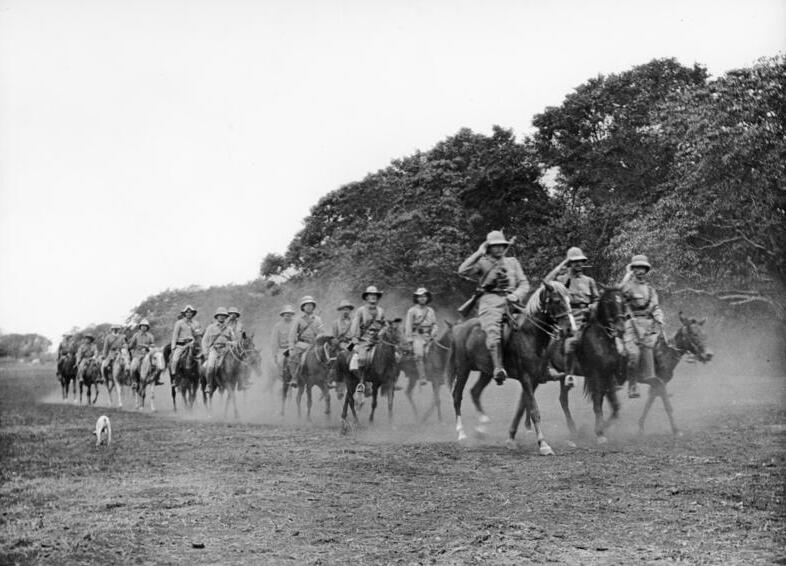
- A mounted contingent of the German 8th Rifle Company, 1914
Date	November 3, 1914
Location	Longido District, Arusha, German East Africa 3°4′33″S 37°21′12″E
Result	German victory

Belligerents
German Empire: German East Africa	British Empire: India

Commanders and leaders
Major Georg Kraut	(British Empire) Brigadier J. M. Stewart

Strength
686	~1,500

Casualties and losses
109	312
- Location within Tanzania Battle of Kilimanjaro (Africa)

The Battle of Kilimanjaro at Longido took place in German East Africa in November 1914 and was an early skirmish during the East African Campaign of the First World War.

== Background ==
The British conquest of German East Africa was planned as a two-pronged invasion of the German colony, at the port town of Tanga and the settlement Longido on the slopes of Mount Kilimanjaro. The plan was designed at a Mombasa staff conference with Major-General Arthur Aitken in overall command. The first and largest prong was an advance towards Tanga by the Indian Expeditionary Force "B", consisting of some 8,000 men organised into two brigades.

The second prong would be an attack on the German defences at Longido in the north around Kilimanjaro, then swing south and seize Neu Moshi, the western terminus of the Usambara or Northern Railroad. According to author Charles Miller, "the objective for the capture of Longido was to squeeze the German Schutztruppe in the upper end of a two-hundred-mile pincer." The region was a major German settlement area with established plantations of sisal, coffee and other cash crops at the northern edge of the Usambara highlands. Since small German raiding parties had already begun to ambush British detachments and attack the Uganda Railway, the destruction of German forces in the area bordering British East Africa was a key objective of the British plan of operation. Miller later wrote that "the strategy was faultless on paper."

By late October 1914 the Indian Expeditionary Force "C" gathered with 4,000 men near the borders of British and German East Africa, commanded by Brigadier-General J. M. Stewart. The brigade included colonial volunteers who called themselves the East Africa Mounted Rifles. Flawed intelligence reports estimated the German military presence in the region at 200 men; however, there were 600 askaris of the Schutztruppe in three companies plus the 8th Rifle Company, consisting of 86 settlers on horseback.

== Battle ==
On 3 November 1914, some 1,500 Punjabis of the British Indian Army came up the slope at night near Longido and, at daylight in the morning fog, were caught in the crossfire of a strong German defensive position. The large force of Indian infantry fought well when counterattacked, however, during the day the attackers made no headway, but suffered substantial casualties.

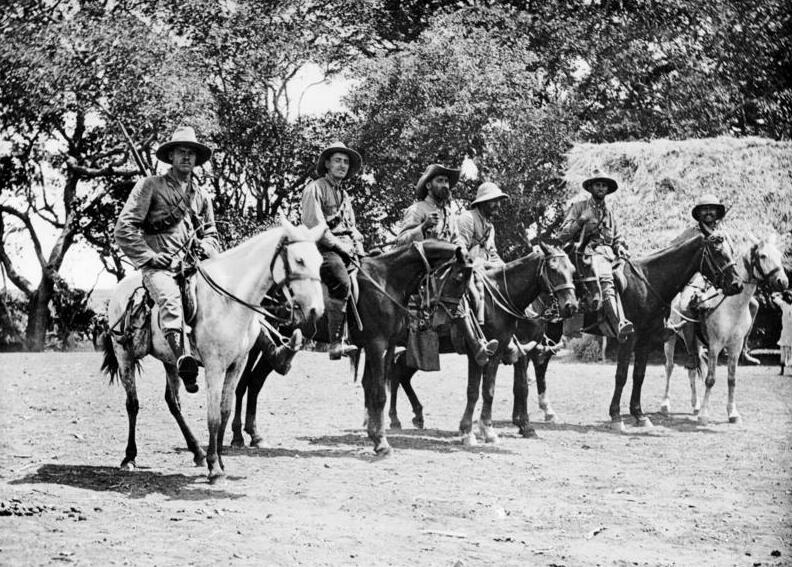
German colonial volunteer mounted patrol, 1914

By mid-morning, a mounted patrol of the 8th Rifle Company ambushed a British supply column; roughly 100 mules carrying water for the troops were stampeded away by the German horsemen. Some of the native carriers in the column panicked and dropped their loads leaving food, ammunition and equipment behind. The British commanders with their now widely scattered troops waited until darkness, determined their situation to be untenable, pulled out and down the mountain and marched back to British East Africa having accomplished nothing. This defeat of the invaders by a force less than half their size cooled enthusiasm for war, especially among the British colonial volunteers.

== Aftermath ==
The northern prong attack at Longido had been intended as little more than a diversion. Byron Farwell recounts that "the main effort was [the] ambitious amphibian assault on the port of Tanga" that commenced on 2 November 1914. With the northern prong accounted for, the askari companies were shuttled by rail to Tanga to assist in opposing the southern prong.

== See also ==
- Battle of Tanga
- Paul Emil von Lettow-Vorbeck

== Bibliography ==
- Farwell, Byron. The Great War in Africa, 1914–1918. New York: W. W. Norton & Company, 1989. ISBN 0-393-30564-3
- Hoyt, Edwin P. Guerilla: Colonel von Lettow-Vorbeck and Germany's East African Empire. New York: Macmillan Publishing Co., Inc. 1981; and London: Collier Macmillan Publishers. 1981. ISBN 0-02-555210-4
- Miller, Charles. Battle for the Bundu: The First World War in German East Africa. London: Macdonald & Jane's, 1974; and New York: Macmillan Publishing Co., Inc. 1974. ISBN 0-02-584930-1
