= Battle of Latema Nek =

Battle during the First World War

- Part of the East African Campaign (World War I)
Date	11–12 March 1916
Location	Latema-Reata Hills, British East Africa 3°24′13″S 37°37′05″E
Result	British victory

Belligerents
German Empire: German East Africa	British Empire: South Africa; Rhodesia

Commanders and leaders
Major Georg Kraut	(British Empire) Major-General Wilfrid Malleson (British Empire) Brigadier-General Michael Tighe

Strength
1,500–2,000; 3+ machine guns	5 battalions

Casualties and losses
70+ killed	270 killed, wounded or missing
- Location within Tanzania Battle of Latema Nek (Africa)

The Battle of Latema Nek took place during the East African Campaign in World War I.

== Background ==
Following the Battle of Salaita, General Paul von Lettow-Vorbeck, commander of German forces in East Africa, reorganized the defenses to the north of the colony in anticipation of another assault. The Salaita positions were abandoned, and German forces moved south to the Latema-Reata Hills, which stood on the route to Kahe. On March 8, Major Georg Kraut, who had commanded the German defense at Salaita, manned the new defenses with 1,500–2,000 Schutztruppe and German officers. Aside from the fact that there were now two hills to assault (with the Nek between them), the problems facing General Wilfrid Malleson were similar to those at Salaita. The hills were covered by dense bush, which became thicker further up the hills. The plains around the hills provided no cover, meaning any attacking force would be subjected to murderous fire from above.

== The First Attack ==
The attack on Latema began on 11 March at 11:45am. Brigadier-General Malleson, fresh from defeat at Salaita, had at his disposal the 1st East African Brigade for the operation, consisting of:

- Belfield's Mounted Scouts
- Mounted Infantry Company
- Nos. 6 and 8 Field Batteries
- 134th (Cornwall) Heavy Battery, Royal Garrison Artillery (Howitzers)
- 2nd Rhodesia Regiment
- 3rd King's African Rifles
- 130th King George's Own Baluchis
- A machine gun battery of the Loyal North Lancashires
- Volunteer Machine Gun Company

Malleson ordered his men into a frontal assault on Latema Hill. It was impossible for any diversionary flanking attack to take place due to the denseness of the terrain to the sides of the battlefield, especially to the south – which was covered by a swamp. The Baluchis and 3rd King's African Rifles were sent into the attack – holding the right and left respectively – with the Rhodesian Regiment held in reserve. This was the first action that the 3rd KAR had fought as a unit. The infantry was supported by artillery, which bombarded the German positions from a range of 3,000 yards. Before they could reach the enemy positions, however, the British were forced back by heavy rifle, machine gun and small-calibre artillery fire. As the attack floundered, British commander General Malleson asked to be relieved of his command due to serious illness. Theatre Commander Jan Smuts consented, and the able Brigadier-General Michael Tighe was brought in as his replacement. At 2pm the attack was resumed across the open level ground but was held at about 1,000 yards from the German positions.

== The Second Attack ==
At 4pm the 5th South African Regiment arrived in reserve at Taveta. Newly appointed commander Brig. General Tighe ordered a second assault to begin at 5pm. This time the Rhodesians led the way with the King's African Rifles, the 130th Buluchis protecting the right flank. More reinforcements – the 9th and 5th Field Batteries – were sent immediately into action in support of the attack. The assaulting forces once again failed to reach their objective, suffering casualties which included the commander of the King's African Rifles, Lieutenant-Colonel B.R. Graham. A few isolated pockets of attackers reached the top during the gathering darkness, but were also eventually forced to retreat by German counter-attacks. To shore up the attacking units, Tighe ordered half of the 5th South African Regiment into the line. Despite the reinforcements the Entente troops were again forced to withdraw. Smuts responded by putting the 7th South African Regiment under Tighe's command. The 7th reached Tighe at roughly 8pm, and a new plan was drawn up. The two South African Regiments, who were the freshest troops available, would attack the Nek at night – with bayonets fixed.

== The Third Attack ==
The third and final wave set off at 9:15pm and straight away faced the same problems as the earlier attempts to take the Nek, compounded by the lack of light. The 5th Regiment led the assault, with the 7th slightly behind them. This time the South Africans managed to force their way up both hills until the enemy was left on the Nek itself – here the advance stalled. In the confusion of the darkness, large numbers of men became lost – they retreated back to their starting positions to join the 1st East African Brigade in reserve. At the same time men of the King's African Rifles and the Rhodesians, who had been separated from their units in previous attacks and were still on the hills, rejoined the attack. Lieutenant-Colonel Freeth (with 18 men) and Major Thompson (with 170 men) held onto the summits of Latema and Reata. Tighe was unable to follow the events of the battle and fearing heavy casualties and possible counterattack, ordered a withdrawal at 4:20am. However, as patrols reached the Nek to order the retreat, they found Freeth and Thompson in command of the heights and the Germans in full retreat. Smuts ordered the 8th South African Regiment to the field in order to consolidate the position.

== Aftermath ==
Following the battle the Germans retreated to Lake Kahe in order to prepare further defences. Freeth and Thompson were both awarded the Distinguished Service Order for their decisive roles in the engagement. General Tighe retained his command of the 2nd Division as Mallesons replacement.
