= Battle of Jassin =

Battle during WW1

- Part of the East African Campaign of World War I
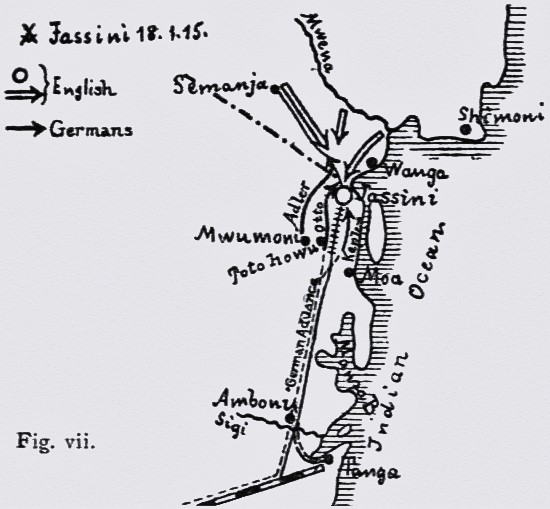
Date	18–19 January 1915
Location	Jassin, Mayomboni, Mkinga District, German East Africa 4°40′53″S 39°11′4″E
Result	German victory

Belligerents
German Empire: German East Africa	(United Kingdom of Great Britain and Ireland) British Empire: India

Commanders and leaders
Paul von Lettow-Vorbeck	(British Raj) Raghbir Singh † (United Kingdom of Great Britain and Ireland) Captain J.G.J. Hanson (United Kingdom of Great Britain and Ireland) Captain J. Turner

Strength
244 Germans; 1,350 Askaris; 23 machine guns 4 field guns	Initially: 300; Relief Force: 800; 1 Town-class light cruiser

Casualties and losses
86 killed 200 wounded	200 killed 320–400 captured
- Location within Tanzania Battle of Jassin (Africa)

The Battle of Jassin (also known as the Battle of Yasin, the Battle of Jasin, the Battle of Jasini or the Battle of Jassini) was a World War I battle that took place on 18– 19 January 1915 at Jassin on the German East African side of the border with British East Africa between a German Schutztruppe force and British and Indian troops. Jassin had been occupied by the British in order to secure the border between British East Africa and German territory, but was weakly defended by a garrison of four companies of Indian troops, commanded by Colonel Raghbir Singh and numbering a little over 300 men. Colonel Singh was killed during the battle.

The German commander, Paul Emil von Lettow-Vorbeck, decided to attack Jassin in order to prevent further danger to Tanga, which lay more than 50 kilometres to the south and had previously been successfully defended against a British attack. Nine companies of Schutztruppe with European officers were gathered for the assault.

Immediately after the British force surrendered, British Captains Hanson and Turner were taken to see Lettow-Vorbeck. He congratulated them on their defence of the town before releasing them on the promise they would play no further part in the war.

== Aftermath ==
Brigadier-General Michael Tighe arrived too late, just hours after the surrender to support the British at Jassin. Although the British force surrendered, Lettow-Vorbeck realised that the level of German losses of officers and ammunition meant that he could rarely afford confrontation on such a large scale and would need to make use of guerrilla warfare instead—he turned his attention away from seeking decisive battle against the British, concentrating instead on operations against the Uganda Railway. The British response was to withdraw and concentrate their forces in order to reduce their risks and make defence easier. As a result, the invasion of German East Africa was postponed for some time.
