= Michael Tighe =

British Army general (1964–1925)

Lieutenant-General Sir Michael Tighe KCMG KCB CIE DSO
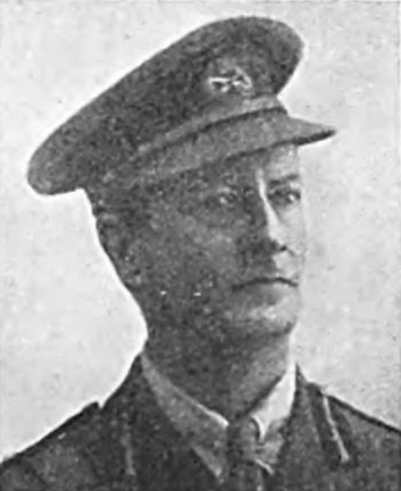
- Born: 21 May 1864; Trincomalee, Ceylon
- Died: 5 September 1925 (aged 61); London
- Burial place: East Sheen Cemetery
- Alma mater: Royal Military Academy, Sandhurst
- Spouse: Katherine Mackay (m. 1900)
- Military career
- Allegiance: United Kingdom
- Branch: British Indian Army
- Service years: 1883–1920
- Rank: Lieutenant-general
- Nickname: Mickey
- Unit: Bombay Staff Corps
- Commands: 56th Punjabi Rifles; Imperial Service Infantry Brigade; British Forces, East Africa; 2nd East African Division; 6th (Poona) Division
- Conflicts: Third Anglo-Burmese War; Chin-Lushai Expedition; Anglo-Egyptian conquest of Sudan; East African expedition; First World War; East African campaign; Battle of Tanga; Battle of Salaita Hill; Battle of Latema Nek; Third Anglo-Afghan War
- Awards: Order of the Brilliant Star of Zanzibar
- Other work: Big-game hunting

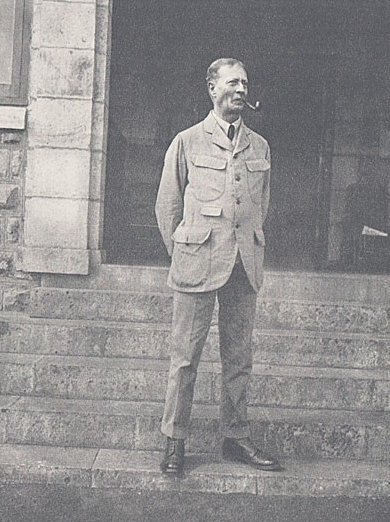
Tighe in Nairobi, 1915

Sir Michael Joseph Tighe KCMG KCB CIE DSO (21 May 1864 – 5 September 1925) was a British Indian Army officer who served in East Africa during the First World War.

== Biography ==
Michael Joseph Tighe was born on 21 May 1864 in Trincomalee, Ceylon. He graduated from Sandhurst Military College and was commissioned in the British Army in August 1883; joining the new Leinster Regiment. He served in the Third Anglo-Burmese War, in Burma, China, East Africa and Persia, and also received the Order of the Brilliant Star of Zanzibar (2nd class). Tighe commanded the 56th Punjabi Rifles before retiring in 1913.

He returned to service during World War I, serving as a Brigadier-General in the East African campaign against the Germans under Colonel Paul von Lettow-Vorbeck. He was promoted to temporary major general on 16 April 1915. This was made substantive on 29 October as a reward "for distinguished service in the Field". In 1917 he was posted to India and later retired again, with the rank of Lieutenant-General.

He died in London on 5 September 1925.
