= George Rolland =

British recipient of the Victoria Cross

George Murray Rolland
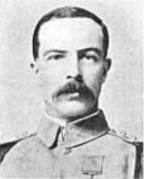
- Born: 12 May 1869; Wellington, Tamil Nadu, British India
- Died: 9 July 1910 (aged 41); Nagpur, India
- Burial place: Takli Cemetery, Nagpur
- Military career
- Allegiance: United Kingdom; British India
- Branch: British Army; British Indian Army
- Service years: 1889–1910
- Rank: Major
- Units: Bedfordshire Regiment; Indian Staff Corps; 1st Bombay Grenadiers
- Conflicts: Third Somaliland Expedition
- Awards: Victoria Cross

Major George Murray Rolland VC (12 May 1869 – 9 July 1910) was a recipient of the Victoria Cross, the highest and most prestigious award for gallantry in the face of the enemy that can be awarded to British and Commonwealth forces.

== Early life ==
He was born on 12 May 1869 at Wellington, Madras Presidency, British India, the son of Major P. M. Rolland, R.A., and educated at Harrow and the Royal Military College, Sandhurst, before being commissioned into the Bedfordshire Regiment in November 1889. He transferred to the Indian Staff Corps on the 11 August 1891. He was appointed a double company commander with the 1st Bombay Grenadiers on 4 February 1901, and appointed a Special Service Officer on the Staff of the Somaliland Field Force on 25 October 1902, leaving Bombay via Aden for British Somaliland the previous day.

== Details ==
He was 33 years old, and a captain in the 1st Bombay Grenadiers, Indian Army, employed Berbera -Bohotle Flying Column during the Third Somaliland Expedition when on 22 April 1903 after the action at British Somaliland, the rearguard got considerably behind the rest of the column. Captain Rolland and William George Walker, with four other men were with a fellow officer when he fell badly wounded and Captain Rolland ran back some 500 yards to get help while the others stayed with the casualty, endeavouring to keep off the enemy who were all round. This they succeeded in doing, and when the officer in charge of the column (John Edmund Gough) arrived they managed to get the wounded man on to a camel. He was, however, hit again and died immediately.

His VC is on display at the Lord Ashcroft Galley in the Imperial War Museum in London.

== Later life ==
In November 1906, he was appointed the Adjutant of the Nagpur Volunteer Rifles, with whom he was serving when he died from a fall. He achieved the rank of major, being promoted 9 November 1907. In 2016, his grave was discovered in Nagpur during a routine cleaning exercise.
