= Georg Kraut =

German army officer

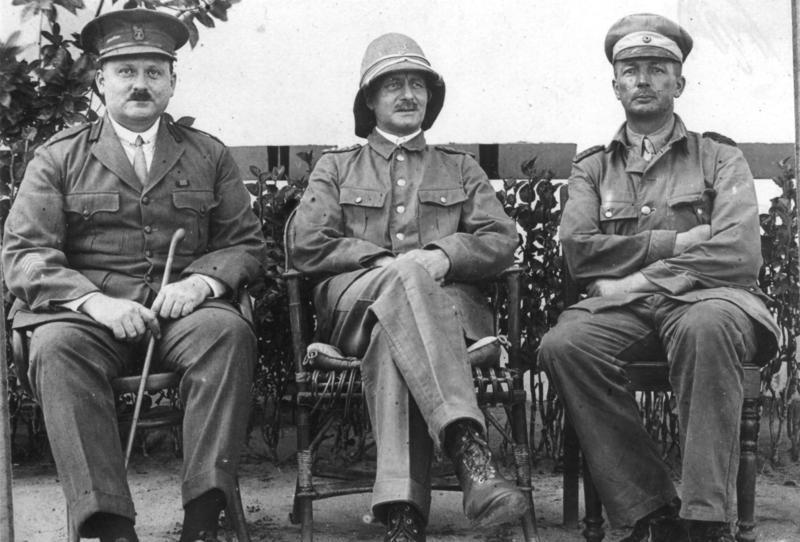
- Georg Kraut (right) with Paul von Lettow-Vorbeck (centre) and a British officer (left) in Dar es Salaam, March 1919.
- Born: 5 October 1870; Hildesheim, Province of Hanover, Prussia
- Died: 10 December 1964 (aged 94); Hildesheim, West Germany
- Military career
- Allegiance: German Empire (1892–1918); Weimar Republic (1918–20)
- Branch: Imperial German Army: Prussian Army; Reichsheer
- Service years: 1892–1920
- Rank: Oberstleutnant

Major Georg Kraut (5 October 1870 – 10 December 1964) was an officer of the Imperial German Army during the First World War, a veteran of the Schutztruppe, and the second-in-command of Paul von Lettow-Vorbeck.
He was active in German East Africa, where he participated in multiple battles, including the Battle of Tanga, the Battle of Salaita Hill, and the Battle of Iringa. Post-war, he joined the Freikorps with Lettow-Vorbeck and helped suppress the Spartacist Revolt.

== Youth ==
He was born in Hildesheim by Georg and Auguste Kraut, née Hoppenstedt. Together with his four siblings Anne (* 1866), Carl (* 1867), Luise (* 1868) and Wilhelm (* 1879) Kraut, he grew up in a Lutheran family of lawyers.

== First World War ==
In the early months of the war, Paul von Lettow-Vorbeck planned for Kraut, alongside a column of Schutztruppe, to capture Mombasa and secure the Uganda Railway, based on Kraut's pre-war experience in the area as a part of the Anglo-German boundary commission. However, a group of 130 British-led Arabs named "Wavel's Arabs" bogged down Kraut near Mombasa until Indian troops under J. M. Stewart arrived and drove Kraut back to Moshi. During the Battle of Tanga, Kraut commanded 80 German soldiers and 600 askaris at Longido. During the attack on Longido and Namanga, Kraut helped push back the British forces into a retreat. By November 1914, Kraut, commanding a mounted company of European soldiers and three askari companies, was stationed east of Kilimanjaro when South African forces under the command of Jan Christian Smuts advanced. On 16 November, Smuts attacked Latema, where he failed upon his first attempt. However, a repeat of the attack later in the day led to Kraut choosing to retreat.

In February 1916, Kraut participated in the Battle of Salaita Hill, commanding 1400 men. In March 1916, Kraut again returned east of Kilimanjaro to fight over Lake Victoria. In May, Kraut participated in the Battle of Kondoa Irangi, Kraut commanded 2500 men. During the battle, Kraut was placed by Lettow-Vorbeck in the Pare Mountains to block off the British. Kraut's forces were pushed to the Nguru Mountains, where in June they met up with Lettow-Vorbeck's retreating forces. Kraut split up with them, moving to Mahenge. On 24 June, Kraut's forces suffered a defeat against the forces of John Alexander Sheppard near Makunda, leaving 34 dead and taking 53 prisoners. The rest of Kraut's forces managed to escape into the jungle.

In August 1916, Kraut fought against the forces of Edward Northey around Iringa. 2000 men in Kraut's Southwestern Group withdrew as Northey advanced. By August 27, Kraut's force of 760 Germans had withdrawn from the town, allowing Northey to capture it two days later. Kraut set off for Mahenge, where upon the way he joined forces with Major General Kurt Wahle. They decided to try to retake Iringa together. In the ensuing Battle of Iringa with Northey in October 1916, Kraut cut Northey's supply lines. However, upon their defeat, both Kraut and Wahle retreated east to join Lettow-Vorbeck's main army.

== Post-war ==
Upon Germany's loss in the war, Lettow-Vorbeck and his associates went back to Germany. Kraut was a part of the Freikorps, in a unit commanded by Lettow-Vorbeck, and helped in suppressing the Spartacist Revolt.
