= Mayomboni =

Ward of Mkinga District, Tanga Region

Mayomboni Kata ya Mayomboni (Swahili)
- Ward of Mkinga District
- From top to bottom
- Location within Tanzania
- Coordinates: 4°44′36.96″S 39°9′55.8″E
- Country: Tanzania
- Region: Tanga Region
- District: Mkinga District

Area
  - Total: 15.7 km^{2} (6.1 sq mi)

Population (2012)
  - Total: 4,001

Ethnic groups
  - Settler: Swahili
  - Ancestral: Digo people
- Tanzanian Postal Code: 21518

Mayomboni (Kata ya Mayomboni, in Swahili) is an administrative ward of the Mkinga District in the Tanga Region of Tanzania. The Pemba Channel and Kenya form the eastern and northern borders of the ward, respectively. Moa ward lies to the south, and Sigaya and Duga wards are to the west. The ward is home to the small historic border town of Jassini where a WWI battle took place called the Battle of Jassini. According to the 2012 Census the ward had a population of 4,001

== Administration ==
The postal code for Mayomboni Ward is 21518. The ward is divided into the following neighborhoods (Mitaa):

- Jassini
- Kibanda
- Kijiru
- Mahandakani
- Mayomboni

- Mbuluni-Kambini
- Nami
- Ndumbani
- Totohovu

=== Government ===
The ward, like every other ward in the country, has local government offices based on the population served.The Mayomboni Ward administration building houses a court as per the Ward Tribunal Act of 1988, including other vital departments for the administration the ward. The ward has the following administration offices:

- Mayomboni Police Station
- Mayomboni Government Office (Afisa Mtendaji)
- Mayomboni Tribunal (Baraza La Kata) is a Department inside Ward Government Office

In the local government system of Tanzania, the ward is the smallest democratic unit. Each ward is composed of a committee of eight elected council members which include a chairperson, one salaried officer (with no voting rights), and an executive officer. One-third of seats are reserved for women councillors.

== Demographics ==
Like much of the district, the ward is the ancestral home of the Digo people.

== Education and health ==
=== Education ===
The ward is home to these educational institutions:

- Mayomboni Primary School
- Mahandakini Primary School
- Jasini Primary School

=== Healthcare ===
The ward is home to the following health institutions:

- Mayomboni Health Center
