= Nathang Valley =

- Gnathang Valley
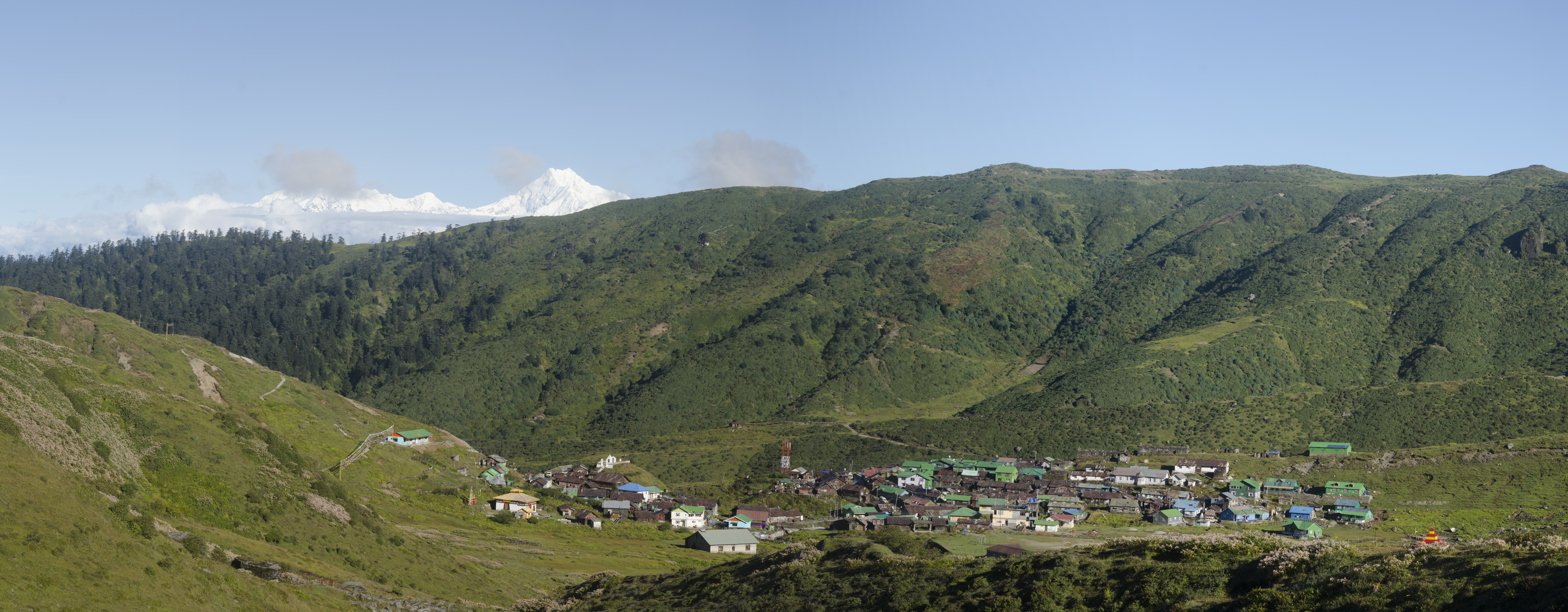

Geography
- State/Province: Sikkim
- Coordinates: 27.300064°N 88.8200967°E

Nathang Valley (also spelt as Natang, Gnathong, Gnathang Valley) Tibetan Himalayan Platue at 4932 meter, 92 KM from Gangtok is located in Pakyong District, Sikkim of India.

The Nathang Valley is part of the Gnathang-Machong Vidhan Sabha constituency of the Sikkim Legislative Assembly.As per the 2011 census of India, Gnathang village covers 16 hectares housing 13 households with a total population of 60 (29 males, 31 females).

== History ==
On 22 May 1888 Tibetan and British forces clashed at Gnathong (this was part of the Anglo-Tibetan war of 1888). The Lieutenant-Governor of Bengal was present during the clash.

== Gnathang village ==
Gnathang village Nathang village
- village
- Interactive map of Gnathang village
- Country: India
- District: Pakyong district
- State: Sikkim

Population
  - Total: approx 150

With a population of around 150 residents, Gnathang has played a role in the construction of border roads in the area including those to Doka La. From a nearby ridge, the plateau of Doklam is visible, which is around 35 km away. Yaks reared by the village are used as food.

== Gallery ==
=== Locations ===
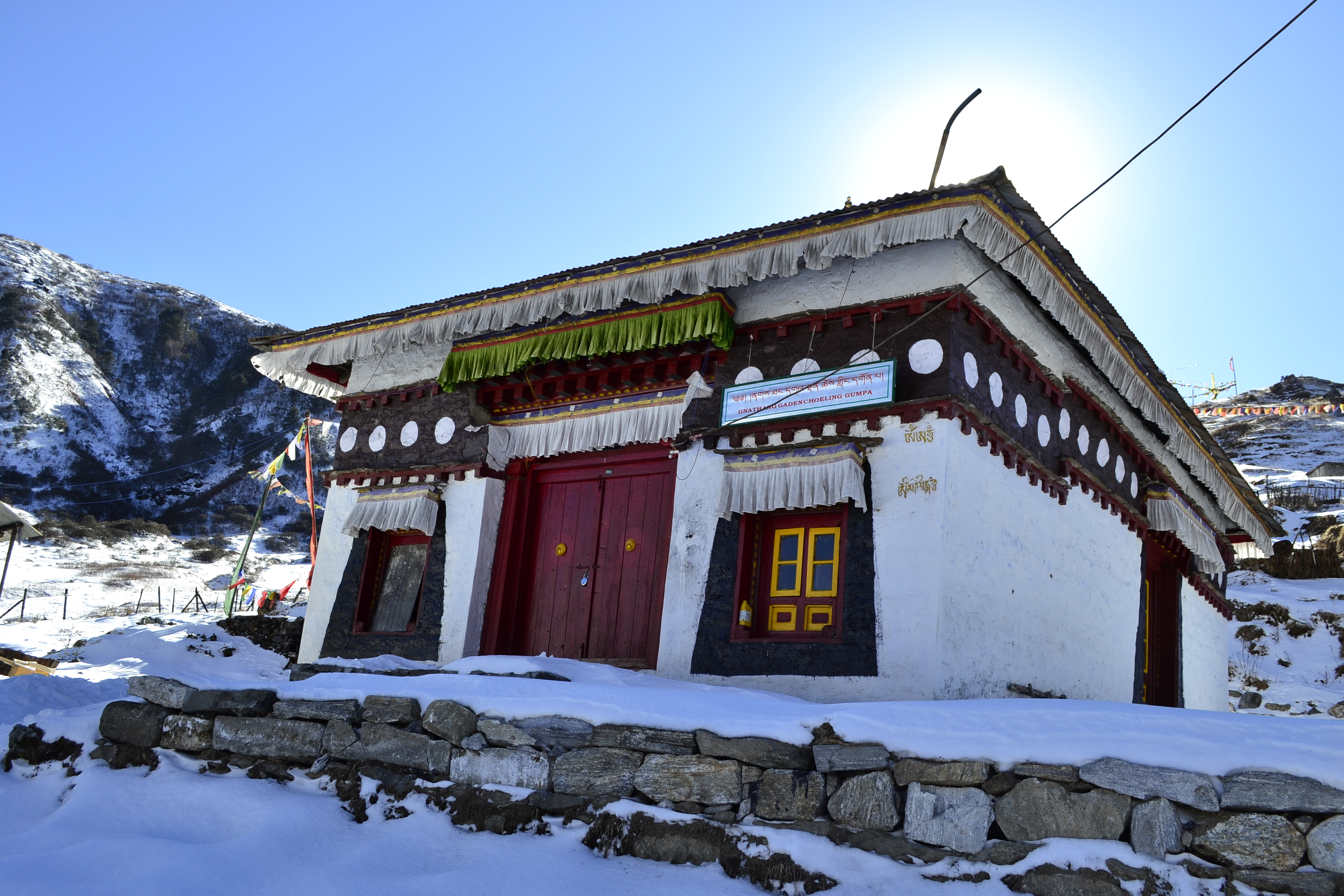
Gnathang Gadenchoeling Gumpa

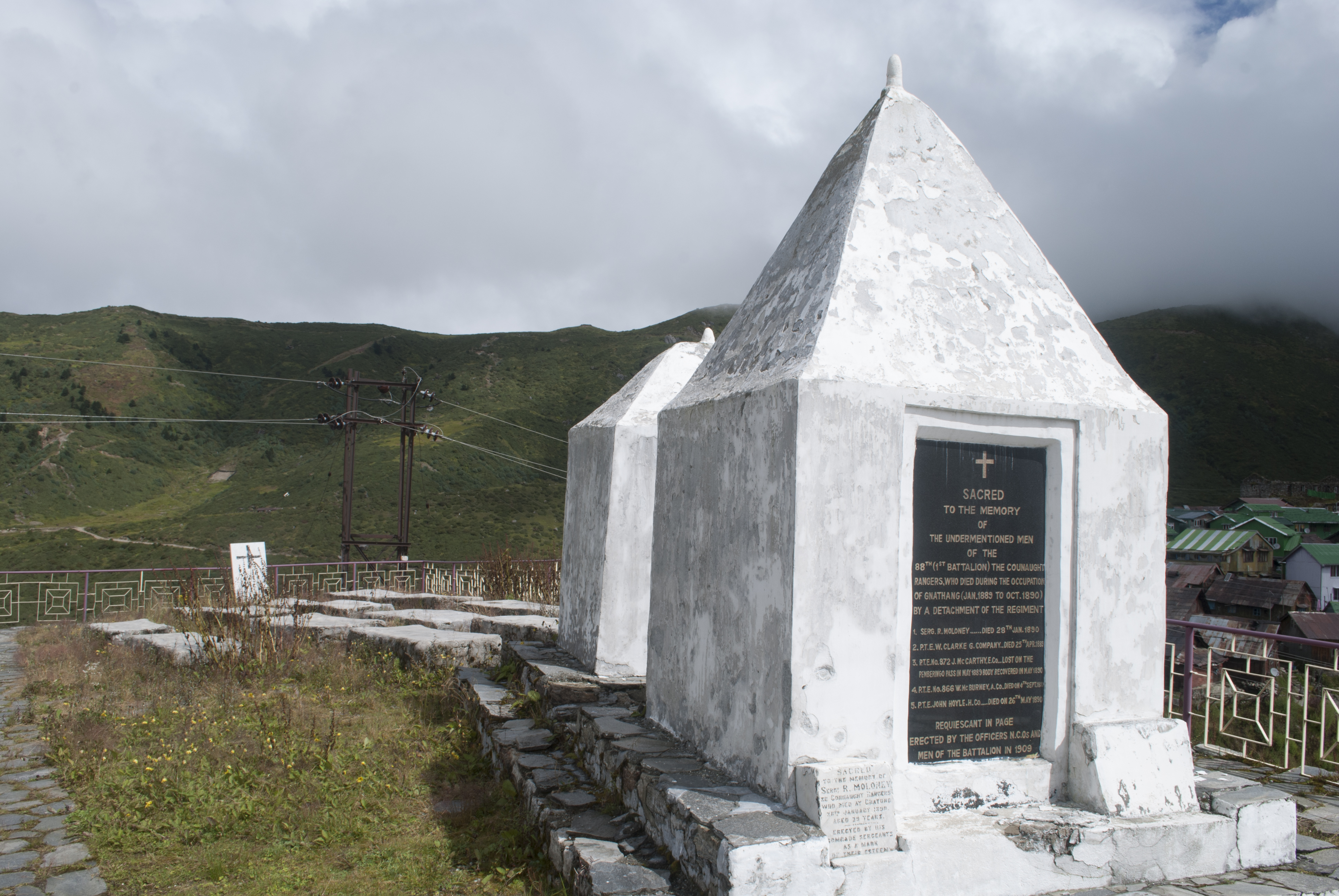
In memory of the men who lost their lives during the 'occupation of Gnathang' in 1889 to 1890.

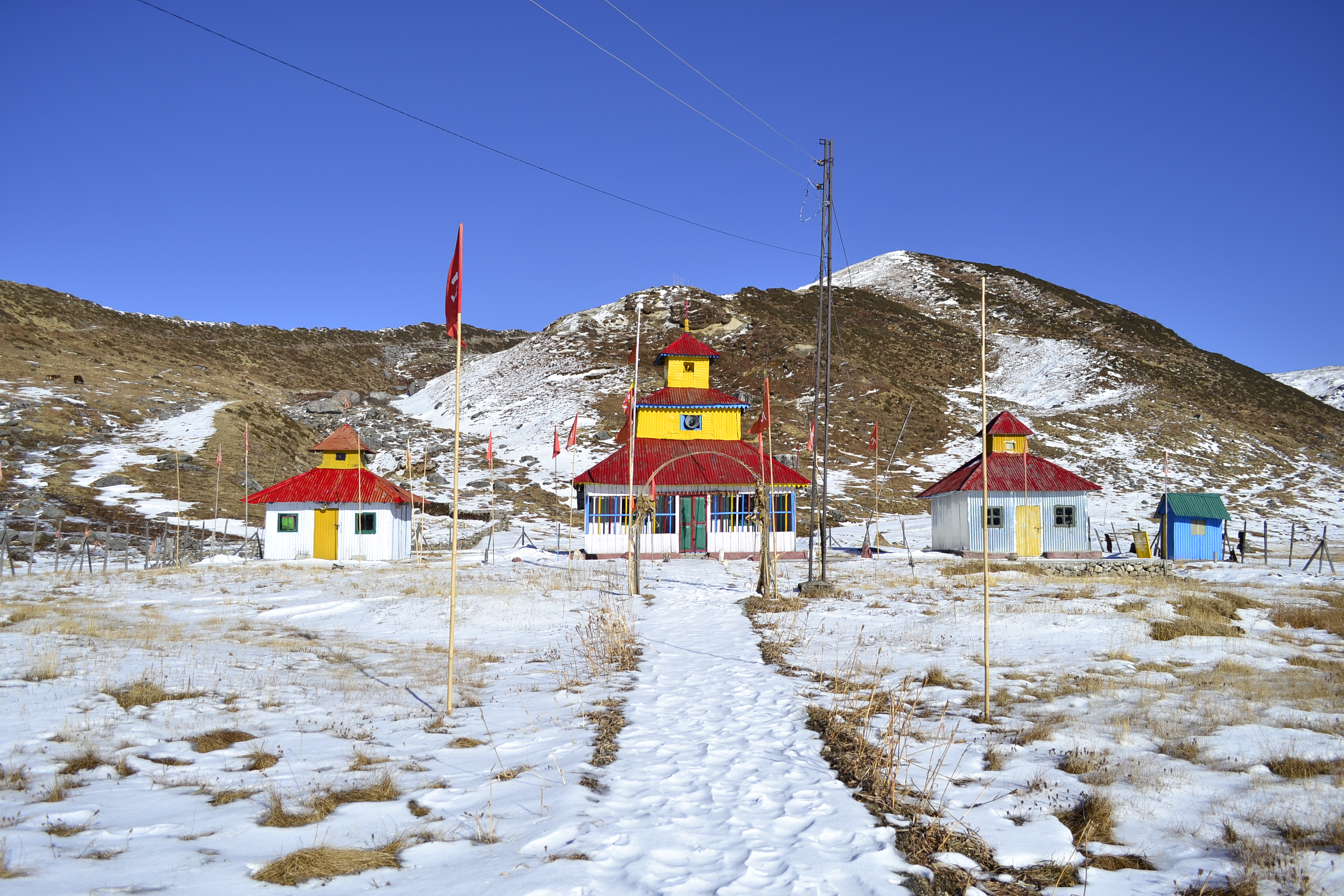
Gnathang Krishna Mandir

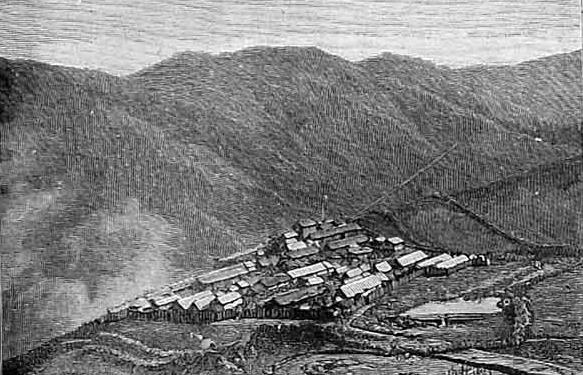
The fort at Gnatong during the Anglo-Tibetan war of 1888

=== Maps ===
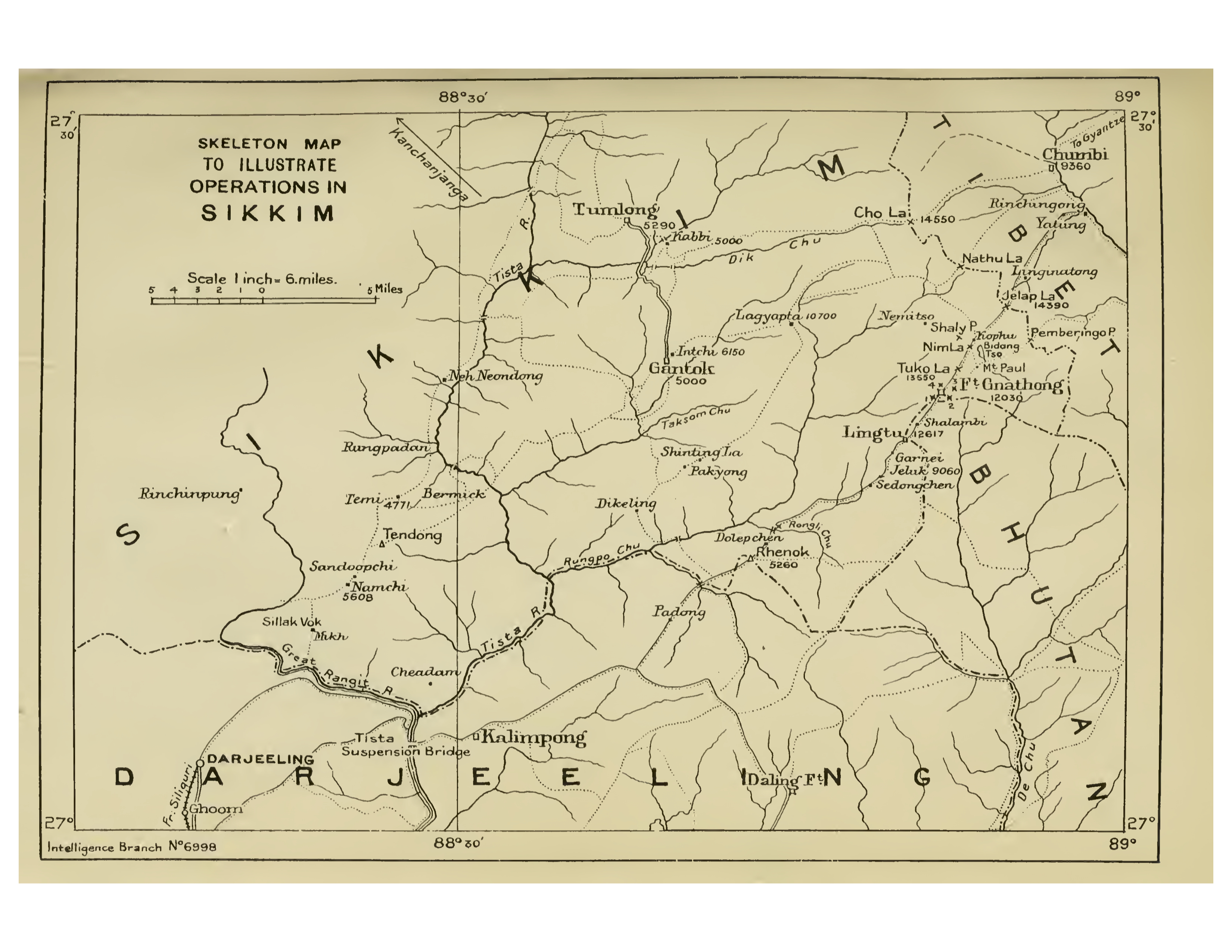

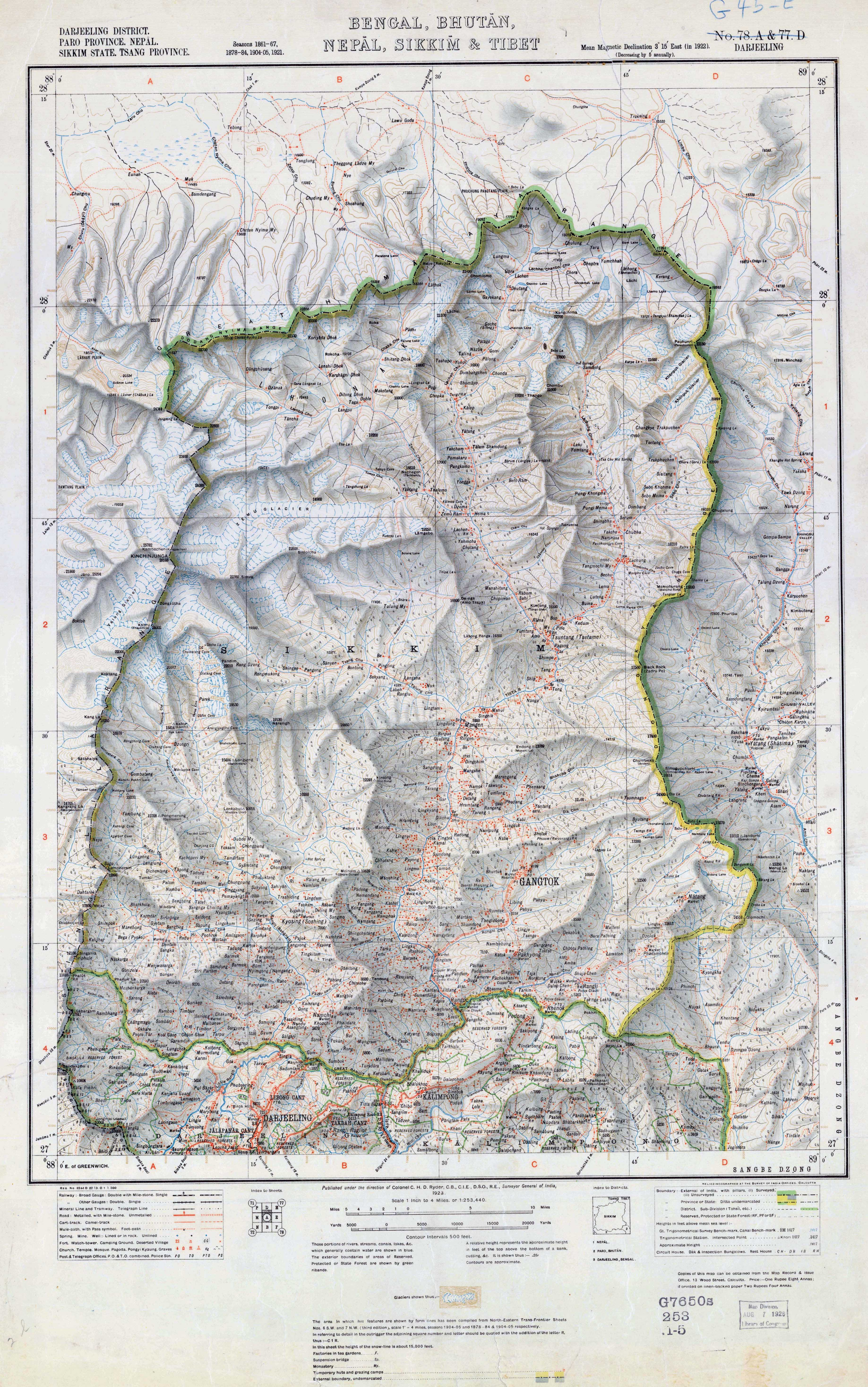
