= Imperial Service Infantry Brigade =

British Indian Army infantry brigade

- Active: August 1914 – November 1914
- Country: British India
- Allegiance: British Crown
- Branch: British Indian Army
- Type: Infantry
- Size: Brigade
- Part of: Indian Expeditionary Force B
- Engagements: First World War East African Campaign Battle of Tanga

The Imperial Service Infantry Brigade was an infantry brigade of the British Indian Army that saw active service in the East African Campaign in the First World War.

== History ==
The Imperial Service Infantry Brigade was formed in August 1914, mostly from Imperial Service Troops (forces raised by the princely states of the British Indian Empire), hence its name. It was assigned to Indian Expeditionary Force B along with 27th (Bangalore) Brigade. The Force sailed from Bombay (Mumbai) on 16 October with Tanga in German East Africa as the target for an attack. After the failure of the Battle of Tanga (2–5 November), the Force disembarked at Mombasa and joined the defences of British East Africa. The brigade was broken up at this point.

== Order of battle ==
The brigade had the following composition in the First World War:

- 13th Rajputs (The Shekhawati Regiment) (Note: 13th Rajputs (The Shekhawati Regiment) remained in East Africa until December 1915. It later served in Colombo, Ceylon; Secunderabad Brigade, 9th (Secunderabad) Division from October 1916; Kohat Brigade from March 1917; and Mesopotamia (unbrigaded) from October 1917.)
- 2nd Battalion, Kashmir Rifles (I.S.) (Note: 2nd Battalion, Kashmir Rifles (I.S.) served as part of the Composite Kashmir Battalion (with half 3rd Kashmir Rifles) from June 1916 in 1st East African Brigade, 1st East African Division. It remained in East Africa until December 1917.)
- half of 3rd Battalion, Kashmir Rifles (I.S.) (Note: Half of 3rd Battalion, Kashmir Rifles (I.S.) served with the 1st East African Brigade from January 1916, the 2nd East African Brigade from March 1916, and as part of the Composite Kashmir Battalion (with 2nd Kashmir Rifles) from June 1916, all with 1st East African Division. It remained in East Africa until February 1918 before returning to India (44th (Ferozepore) Brigade, 16th Indian Division). It was brought up to full strength, moved to Palestine and joined 232nd Brigade, British 75th Division on 3 August 1918 where it remained for the rest of the war.)
- half of 3rd Battalion, Gwalior Infantry (I.S.) (Note: Half of 3rd Battalion, Gwalior Infantry (I.S.) remained in East Africa until January 1918.)

== Commander ==
The brigade was commanded from formation by Brigadier-General Michael Tighe. He later commanded the 2nd East African Division.

== See also ==
- Imperial Service Cavalry Brigade

== Bibliography ==
- Becke, Archibald F. (1937). Order of Battle of Divisions Part 2B. The 2nd-Line Territorial Force Divisions (57th–69th) with The Home-Service Divisions (71st–73rd) and 74th and 75th Divisions. London: HMSO. OCLC 4405016.
- Gaylor, John (1996). Sons of John Company: The Indian and Pakistan Armies 1903–1991 (2nd ed.). Tunbridge Wells: Parapress. ISBN 1-898594-41-4.
- Perry, F.W. (1992). Order of Battle of Divisions Part 5A. The Divisions of Australia, Canada and New Zealand and those in East Africa. Newport: Ray Westlake Military Books. ISBN 1-871167-25-6.
- Perry, F.W. (1993). Order of Battle of Divisions Part 5B. Indian Army Divisions. Newport: Ray Westlake Military Books. ISBN 1-871167-23-X.
