= 13th Rajputs (The Shekhawati Regiment) =

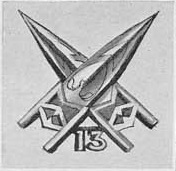
- Active: 1835–1922
- Country: Indian Empire
- Branch: Army
- Type: Infantry
- Part of: Bengal Army (to 1895); Bengal Command
- Uniform: Red; faced blue, 1870 dark blue
- Engagements: Aliwal; Second Anglo-Afghan War; Sikkim Expedition; Chitral

Commanders
- Colonel-in-Chief: Edward VII (1904)

The 13th Rajputs (The Shekhawati Regiment) was an infantry regiment of the Bengal Army, and later of the British Indian Army. They could trace their origins to the Shekhawati Regiment raised in 1835, as part of the Jaipur contingent of the Honourable East India Company and were taken into the company's service as a local battalion 8 years later. They fought in the Battle of Aliwal in the First Anglo-Sikh War. Remaining loyal during the Indian Rebellion of 1857, they were taken into the Bengal Army as the 13th Bengal Native Infantry in 1861. There followed a number of different name changes the 13th (Shekhawati) Bengal Native Infantry 1884–1897, the 13th (Shekhawati) Rajput Regiment of Bengal Infantry 1897–1901, the 13th (Shekhawati) Rajput Infantry 1901–1903. Then finally in 1903, after the Kitchener reforms of the Indian Army the 13th Rajputs (The Shekhawati Regiment). During World War I they were part of the Imperial Service Infantry Brigade assigned to the Indian Expeditionary Force B that was sent to British East Africa. They fought at the Battle of Tanga, where although initially deployed in outdated formations, the regiment subsequently showed steadiness in street fighting with the defending German colonial troops.

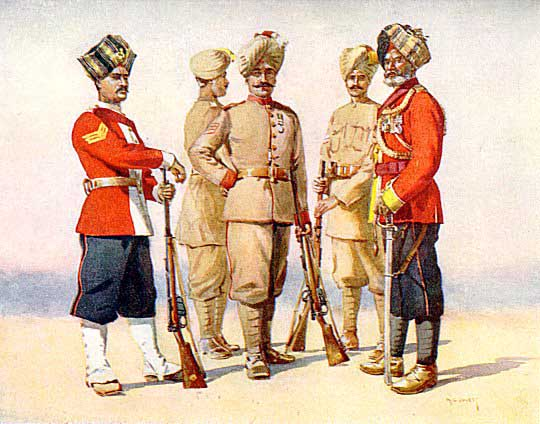
A painting depicting members of the Rajputana Rifles, of all ranks and uniforms. circa. 1911

After World War I, the Indian government reformed the army again, moving from single-battalion regiments to multi-battalion regiments. The 13th Rajputs (The Shekhawati Regiment) now became the 10th (Shekhawati) Battalion 6th Rajputana Rifles (1922–1947). After independence, this was one of the regiments allocated to the new Indian Army.

== Sources ==
- Barthorp, Michael; Burn, Jeffrey (1979). Indian infantry regiments 1860–1914. Osprey Publishing. ISBN 0-85045-307-0.
- Sumner, Ian (2001). The Indian Army 1914–1947. Osprey Publishing. ISBN 1-84176-196-6.
