= Horace Searle Anderson =

Sir Horace Searle Anderson
- Born: 10 September 1833; Hereford, Herefordshire
- Died: 2 June 1907 (aged 73); Horsham, Sussex
- Military career
- Allegiance: United Kingdom
- Branch: British Indian Army
- Service years: 1850-1898
- Rank: General
- Commands: 1st Bombay Grenadiers; Naseerabad District; Nagpur District; Mhow District
- Awards: Knight Commander of the Order of the Bath

General Sir Horace Searle Anderson KCB (10 September 1833 – 2 June 1907) was a British Indian Army officer.

== Military career ==
Educated at Elizabeth College, Guernsey, Anderson was commissioned into the Indian Army on 6 April 1850. He saw action at defence of Khandesh during the Indian Rebellion and, after becoming commanding officer of the 1st Bombay Grenadiers in 1878, saw action again at the Battle of Maiwand in July 1880 during the Second Anglo-Afghan War. Anderson went on to be General Officer Commanding Naseerabad District in India in 1886, General Officer Commanding Nagpur District in 1889 and General Officer Commanding Mhow District in India in 1891. He was promoted to full general on his retirement in March 1898.

He was appointed a Knight Commander of the Order of the Bath in the 1906 Birthday Honours.
