= Jassini =

Jassini Kijiji cha Jassini (Swahili)
- Village of Mayomboni
- Location within Tanzania
- Coordinates: 4.6600274°S 39.188461°E
- Country: Tanzania
- Region: Tanga Region
- District: Mkinga District
- Ward: Mayomboni

Population (2016)
  - Total: 300
- Time zone: UTC+3 (EAT)

Jassini (Kijiji cha Jassini, in Swahili) is a village in Mayomboni ward of Mkinga District in Tanga Region, Tanzania. The village is at the border with Kenya. The town has a significant part of Tanga history as it was the battleground for the Battle of Jassin during WWI. As of 1999, the village was not accessible by motorized vehicles. In the mid-1990s, the village had a population of less than 300 composed of 30 households.

== Pre-Colonial and Colonial History ==
Prior to German colonization, the village of Jassini was home to the WaDigo who often fought with the Maasai. Jassini became part of German East Africa as a result of the Scramble for Africa, and the influence of German colonization was felt in Jassini in the mid-1890s when colonists pacified the region, ending conflicts between the WaDigo and the Maasai. The Germans, and later the British, introduced roads, schools, hospitals, and sisal plantations to the region. By December 1914, during World War I, British forces from British East Africa occupied the Jassini plantation. From January 18–19, 1915, Jassini was the sight of the Battle of Jassini, an attack by German forces on the British occupiers. After World War I, the territory was taken over by the British. In the 1930s, as reported by Hassan Tenga, a member of the village born in 1922, more than 200 households lived and worked on the territory. Some worked for themselves, farming or fishing, and others worked on the sisal plantations. Tenga noted that in this period "There was justice, more justice than when the chiefs made the laws; more justice than today".

== Modern Jassini ==
The most notable feature of Jassini, is that it is bisected by the boundary between Tanzania and Kenya

Jassini is a self-supporting village, "importing very little, exporting virtually nothing". Villagers in Jassini grow maize, cassava, bananas, and sugar cane on household gardens. Cashews and coconuts are harvested from the remains of colonial plantations in limited quantities. Jassini is located on the coast, so the ocean provides fish for the village and the villagers graze cattle and sheep in the area surrounding the village. The village has no electricity or water supply, nor does it have any shops. Some villagers sell soap, tea, or matches.
