= Battle of Salaita Hill =

Battle of Salaita
- Part of the East African campaign
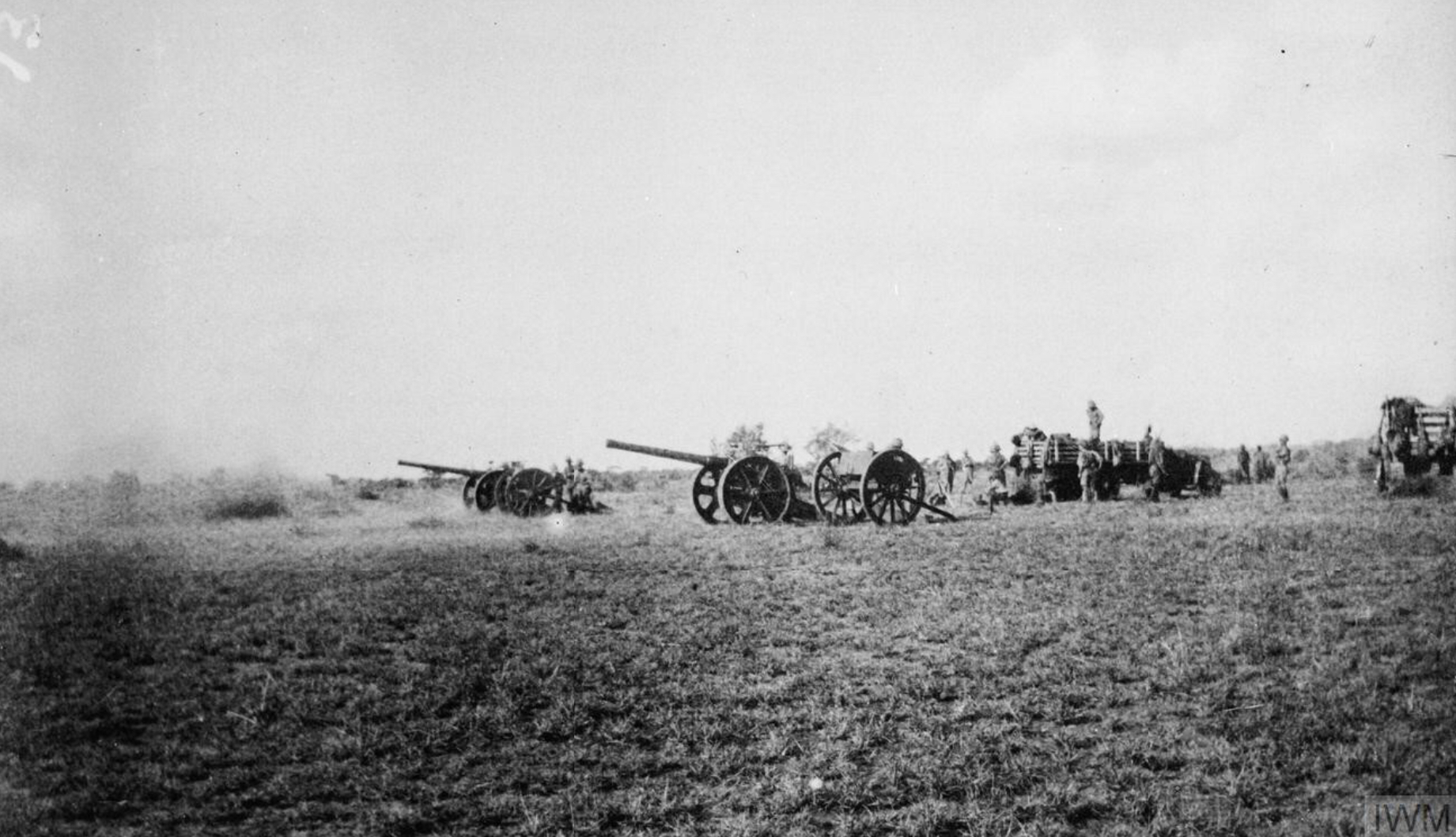
- British 4-inch naval guns on improvised carriages in position above Njoro Drift during the two day bombardment of German positions at Salaita, 8 March 1916.
Date	12 February 1916
Location	Salaita, near Mount Kilimanjaro 3°23′18″S 37°47′17″E
Result	German victory

Belligerents
Germany: German East Africa	United Kingdom: South Africa; Rhodesia; India

Commanders and leaders
Georg Kraut	Wilfrid Malleson

Strength
2,300	6,000; 41 machine guns 18 field guns

Casualties and losses
Unknown (but light)	172 killed, wounded or missing
- Location within Kenya Battle of Salaita Hill (Africa)

The Battle of Salaita Hill (German: Battle of Oldoboro Hill) was the first large-scale engagement of the East African Campaign of the First World War to involve British, Indian, Rhodesian, and South African troops. The battle took place on February 12, 1916, as part of the three-pronged offensive into German East Africa launched by General Jan Smuts, who had been given overall command of the Allied forces in the region.

== Background ==
Salaita was a strategic lookout post close to the border town of Taveta, in present-day Kenya. Its proximity to the border of German East Africa, and the belief that it was defended by only a small detachment of just 300 men without artillery made it an attractive initial objective for Smuts' offensive.

The advance into German East Africa was conducted by the 2nd South African Division, commanded by Brigadier General Wilfrid Malleson. Malleson had little combat experience, having served on the staff of British Field Marshal Kitchener and as part of the British military mission to Afghanistan prior to the outbreak of the First World War.

Brigadier General Beves' 2nd South African Infantry Brigade and the First East African Brigade were chosen to attack Salaita. Including an attached Indian artillery brigade, the force totaled 6,000 men. Despite British intelligence suggesting the contrary, however, Salaita was heavily defended by approximately 1,300 men under local commander Major Georg Kraut. Furthermore, unknown to Malleson there were six Schutztruppe field companies—numbering roughly 1,000 men—in the surrounding area.

== The battle ==
The Allied assault began on the morning of February 12 with a preliminary bombardment of German positions by 4 inch guns salvaged from the sunken cruiser HMS Pegasus. However, due to faulty intelligence, the barrage targeted German secondary trenches at the summit of Salaita Hill instead of the front line, which was further down the slope. It therefore alerted the defenders to the coming attack without disrupting their ability to oppose it. Two hours into the assault, when Malleson's men were 2,000 metres (6,600 ft) from Salaita, German artillery began firing.

Beves deployed his brigade with the 7th South African Infantry Regiment (Lieutenant Colonel J. C. Freeth) leading the assault, with the 5th (Lt. Col. the Honorable J. J. Byron) and 6th (Lt. Col. G. M. J. Molyneux) Regiments holding the left and right flanks respectively. The men deployed in a loose skirmish formation. The South African regiments succeeded in smashing through the German line, but were stopped and then forced to withdraw after suffering casualties from machine guns. As they retreated to their starting positions, they were out-flanked and attacked by a German relief column led by Hauptmann (Captain) Schultz from the nearby town of Taveta. Following this encounter, the force moved further north to Serengeti, having suffered 172 casualties, 138 of them South African.

== Aftermath ==
Racial tension between the 6th South African Infantry Regiment and the 130th Baluchis was a source of some concern. The South African unit was reluctant to serve alongside their Indian colleagues, calling them 'coolies'. When the South Africans were put to flight by German askaris, the Baluchis held firm. They later sent a machine gun, abandoned by the white troops, back to them, with a note which said: "With the compliments of the 130th Baluchis. May we request that you no longer refer to our people as 'coolies'".

As a result of the battle, General Paul von Lettow-Vorbeck—commander of German forces in East Africa—reinforced his units in the Kilimanjaro area. Almost half of Lettow-Vorbeck's forces were eventually redeployed to the region (800 Germans and 5,200 askaris).
