= Arthur Aitken =

British Army officer (1861–1924)

Arthur Edward Aitken
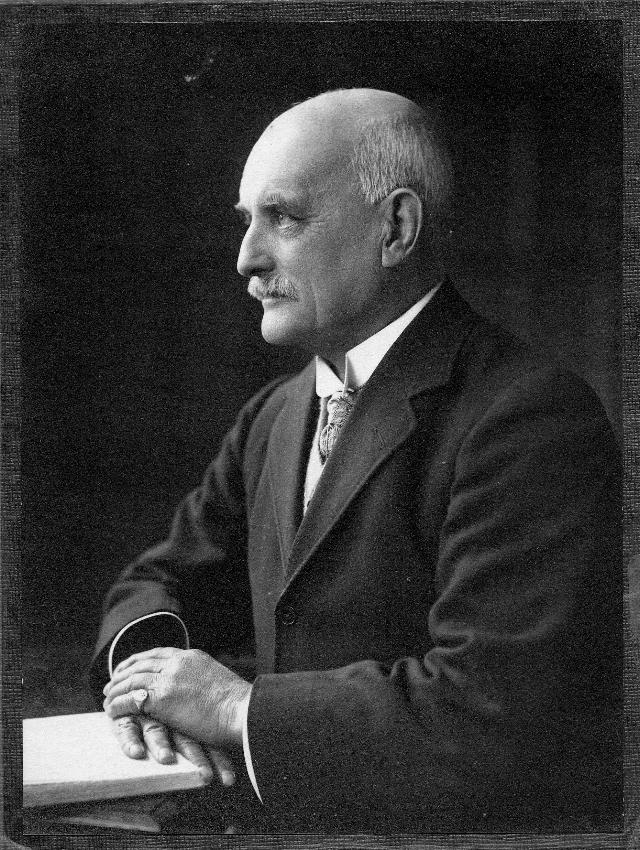
- Born: 25 May 1861; Rochford, Essex, England
- Died: 29 March 1924 (aged 62); Rome, Italy
- Military career
- Allegiance: United Kingdom
- Branch: British Army; British Indian Army
- Service years: 1880−1918
- Rank: Brigadier-General
- Units: Queen's Own Royal West Kent Regiment; Worcestershire Regiment; 119th Infantry (The Mooltan Regiment)
- Commands: Indian Expeditionary Force

Brigadier-General Arthur Edward Aitken (25 May 1861 – 29 March 1924) was a British military commander.

== Military career ==
Born in Rochford in Essex, by the time of the 1871 Census he was a 9-year-old pupil at a school in Brighton, Sussex.

Aitken was commissioned from the Royal Military College, Sandhurst in January 1880 into the 97th (The Earl of Ulster's) Regiment of Foot (later the Queen's Own Royal West Kent Regiment) but transferred to the 29th (Worcestershire) Regiment of Foot (later the Worcestershire Regiment) in February. He saw active service in the Sudan in 1885. He transferred over to the Indian Staff Corps, where he was promoted major on 14 January 1900. While in India, Aitken, a lieutenant colonel in May 1904, was promoted to brevet colonel in 1911 and later that year in November to the temporary rank of brigadier-general while serving as a staff officer.

Following the outbreak of the First World War three years later, Aitken, as a temporary major-general, led the first notable incursion into German East Africa at the head of Indian Expeditionary Force B, and was defeated at the Battle of Tanga in early November 1914.

The battle is often known as the "Battle of the Bees" for the swarms of bees that repeatedly interrupted fighting, with both sides fleeing for cover. Aitken was said to have been overconfident and not to have attempted any reconnaissance work in the area. As an officer of the Indian Army he had little knowledge of the quality of the German colonial troops that he was facing.

The German defence forces were led by Paul von Lettow-Vorbeck, who held out until the end of the war.

Aitken's troops were routed and retreated. There were delays in publishing the details in Britain. He was removed from his command and ultimately (in August 1915) reverted to the rank of colonel. Later it was felt he had been made a scapegoat for the defeat and in 1920 he was formally exonerated. In November 1921 the Secretary of State for India said in the House of Commons that Colonel Aitken had been retired on full pension with the rank of honorary brigadier-general, backdated to May 1918.

During his final years Brigadier General Aitken was a prominent local figure in Bath, Somerset. Because of poor health he spent his final months in Italy and died there suddenly of a heart attack.
