= Battle of Tanga =

1914 battle of the German East African campaign at the African theatre of World war 1

- Part of the East African campaign of World War I
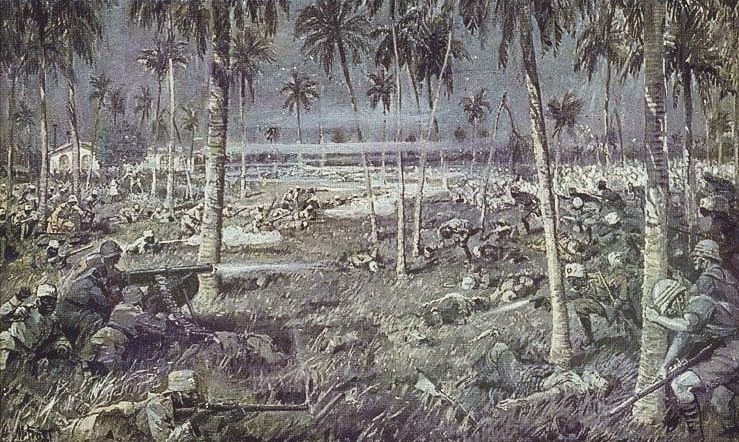
- "Battle of Tanga, 3rd–5th November, 1914" by Martin Frost (1875–1927)
Date	3–5 November 1914
Location	Tanga, German East Africa 5°04′00″S 39°06′00″E
Result	German victory

Belligerents
German Empire: German East Africa	British Empire: India

Commanders and leaders
(German Empire) Paul von Lettow-Vorbeck (German Empire) Tom von Prince †	(British Empire) Arthur Aitken (British Empire) Richard Wapshare (British Empire) Michael Tighe

Strength
250 (Initially); 750 (Reinforcements); Total: 1,000	4,000 (Initially); 5,000 (Reinforcements); 1 Astraea-class cruiser Total: 9,000

Casualties and losses
16 Germans killed 55 Askaris killed 76 Germans & Askaris wounded	360 killed 487 wounded 148 missing
- Location within Tanzania Battle of Tanga (Africa)

The Battle of Tanga, also known as the Battle of the Bees, was an unsuccessful invasion of the Port of Tanga in German East Africa by the British Indian Expeditionary Force "B" on 3–5 November 1914 during World War I. Under the command of the Major-General Arthur Aitken, British forces attacked Tanga in concert with Indian Expeditionary Force "C", which concomitantly attempted to capture Longido. The battle was the first major engagement of the East African campaign and saw Aitken's troops defeated by a smaller force of German Schutztruppen under Paul von Lettow-Vorbeck and forced to retreat. Lettow-Vorbeck's men captured weapons, medical supplies, tents, blankets, rations and several Maxim guns after the battle, which played a major role in allowing his troops to resist the Entente for the rest of the world conflict.

== Background ==
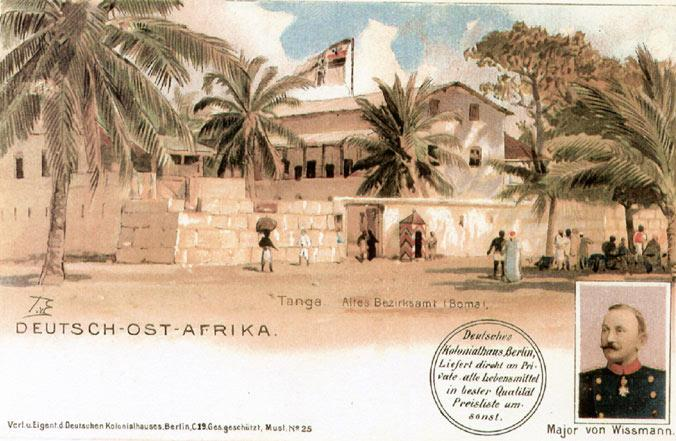
Tanga in 1914

Tanga, situated only 80 kilometres (50 mi) from the border of British East Africa (modern-day Kenya), was a busy port and the ocean terminal of the important Usambara Railway, which ran from Tanga to Neu Moshi at the foot of Mount Kilimanjaro. Tanga was initially to be bombarded by Royal Navy warships, but this part of the plan was scrapped. An agreement was in place guaranteeing the neutrality of the capital Dar es Salaam and Tanga, but now the accord was modified and it seemed "only fair to warn the Germans that the deal was off."

Instead, the British resolve to capture German East Africa was to be implemented with an amphibious attack on Tanga. Unlike the plan on paper, however, the attack turned into a debacle. On 2 November 1914, the British protected cruiser HMS Fox arrived. The ship's commander, Captain Francis Wade Caulfeild, went ashore giving Tanga one hour to surrender and take down the flag of the German Empire. Before departing, he demanded to know if the harbour was mined; it was not, but he was assured that it was. After three hours, the flag was still flying and Fox departed to bring in the Force "B" convoy of fourteen troop transports. This gave time for both the Schutztruppen and the citizens of Tanga to prepare for an attack. The German commander, Lieutenant Colonel Paul von Lettow-Vorbeck, rushed to Tanga. He reinforced the defences (initially only a single company of Askaris) with troops brought in by railway from Neu Moshi, eventually numbering about 1,000 in six companies. His second-in-command was former German East Africa Company Captain Tom von Prince.

== Battle ==
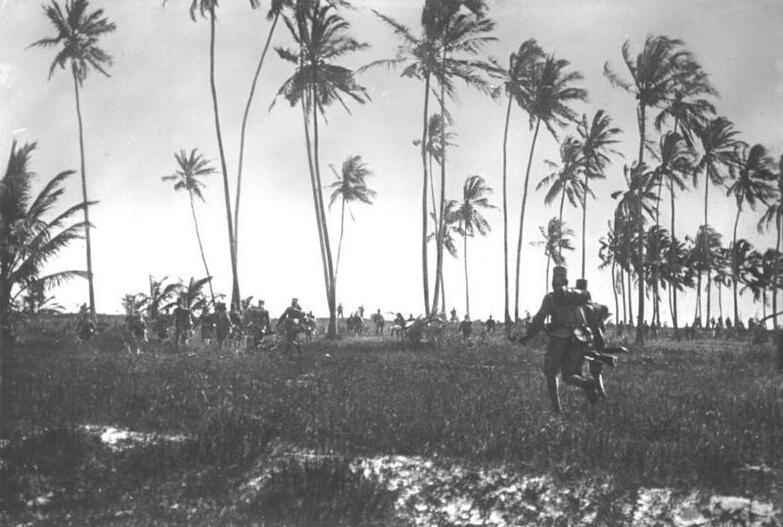
Askari skirmish, 1914, possibly Tanga

Captain Caulfeild ordered the harbour swept for mines during 2 November and well into the next day. During the sweeping, the Force "B" commander, Aitken, began the unopposed landing of troops and supplies in two groups at the harbour and three miles east of the city on a mine-free beach. By evening on 3 November, the invasion force was ashore with the exception of the 27th Mountain Battery and the Faridkot Sappers. At noon on 4 November, Aitken ordered his troops to march on the city. Well concealed defenders quickly broke up their advance. The fighting then turned to skirmishing amidst the coconut and palm oil plantations by the southern contingent and bitter street-fighting by the harbour force.

The Kashmir Rifles and the 2nd Loyal North Lancashire Regiment of the harbour contingent made good progress; they entered the town, captured the customs house and Hotel Deutscher Kaiser and ran up the Union Jack. But then the advance was stopped. Less-well trained and equipped Indian battalions of Richard Wapshare's 27th (Bangalore) Brigade scattered and ran away from the battle. The 98th Infantry were attacked by swarms of angry bees and broke up. The bees attacked the Germans as well, hence the battle's nickname. British propaganda transformed the bee interlude into a fiendish German plot, conjuring up hidden trip wires to agitate the hives. The 13th Rajputs failed to play a significant role in the battle as their morale had been shaken when witnessing the retreat of the 63rd Palamcottah Light Infantry.

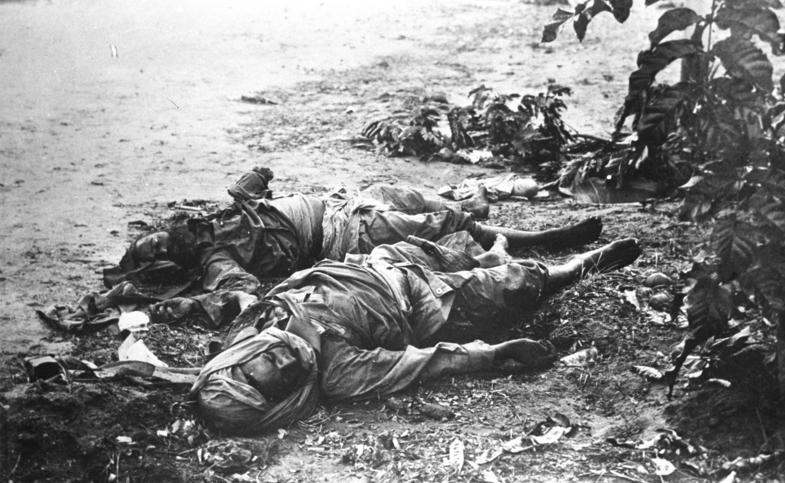
Dead Indian soldiers on the Tanga beach after the battle

The colonial volunteers of the 7th and 8th Schützenkompanien (rifle companies) arrived by railway to stiffen the pressed Askari lines. The normally mounted 8th Schützenkompanie had left their horses at Neu Moshi. By late afternoon on 4 November, Lettow-Vorbeck ordered his last reserves, the 13th and 4th Askari Feldkompanien (field companies) – the 4th had just reached Tanga by train), to envelop the British flank and rear by launching bayonet attacks along the entire front to "bugle calls and piercing tribal war cries." At least three battalions of the Imperial Service Brigade would have been wiped out to a man, if they had not taken to their heels. All semblance of order vanished as Force B's retirement "degenerated into total rout."

Anglo-Indian force retreating at Tanga

Still outnumbered nine to one, caution overtook some of the German officers. Through a series of errors by the buglers and misunderstandings by an officer to disengage and consolidate, the Askari withdrew to a camp several miles west of Tanga. As soon as Lettow-Vorbeck learned of this, he countermanded the move and ordered a redeployment that was not completed until early morning. "For nearly all of the night [before sunrise 5 November], Tanga was Aitken's for the taking. It was the most stupendous irony of the battle."

== Aftermath ==
Furious and frustrated, Aitken ordered a general withdrawal. In their retreat and evacuation back to the transports that lasted well into the night, the attacking troops left behind nearly all their equipment. "Lettow-Vorbeck was able to re-arm three Askari companies with modern rifles, for which he now had 600,000 rounds of ammunition. He also had sixteen more machine guns, valuable field telephones" and enough clothing to last the Schutztruppe for a year. On the morning of 5 November, Force B's intelligence officer—Captain Richard Meinertzhagen—entered Tanga under a white flag, bringing medical supplies and carrying a letter from General Aitken apologizing for shelling the hospital. The streets of Tanga were strewn with dead and wounded. German doctors and their African orderlies worked tirelessly and "with a fine disregard for their patients' uniforms."

The successful defence of Tanga was the first of many achievements of Lettow-Vorbeck during his long campaign in East Africa. For the British, however, the battle was nothing short of a disaster, and was recorded in the British Official History of the War as "one of the most notable failures in British military history." Casualties included 360 killed and 487 wounded on the British side; the Schutztruppe lost 16 Germans and 55 Askaris killed, and 76 total wounded.

Paul von Lettow-Vorbeck initially estimated the number of British killed at 800 but later said that he believed the number was more likely over 2,000. The Germans subsequently released the British officers who had been wounded or captured after they gave their word not to fight again during the war.

== See also ==
- East African campaign (World War I)
- Battle of Kilimanjaro
