= History of Sikkim =

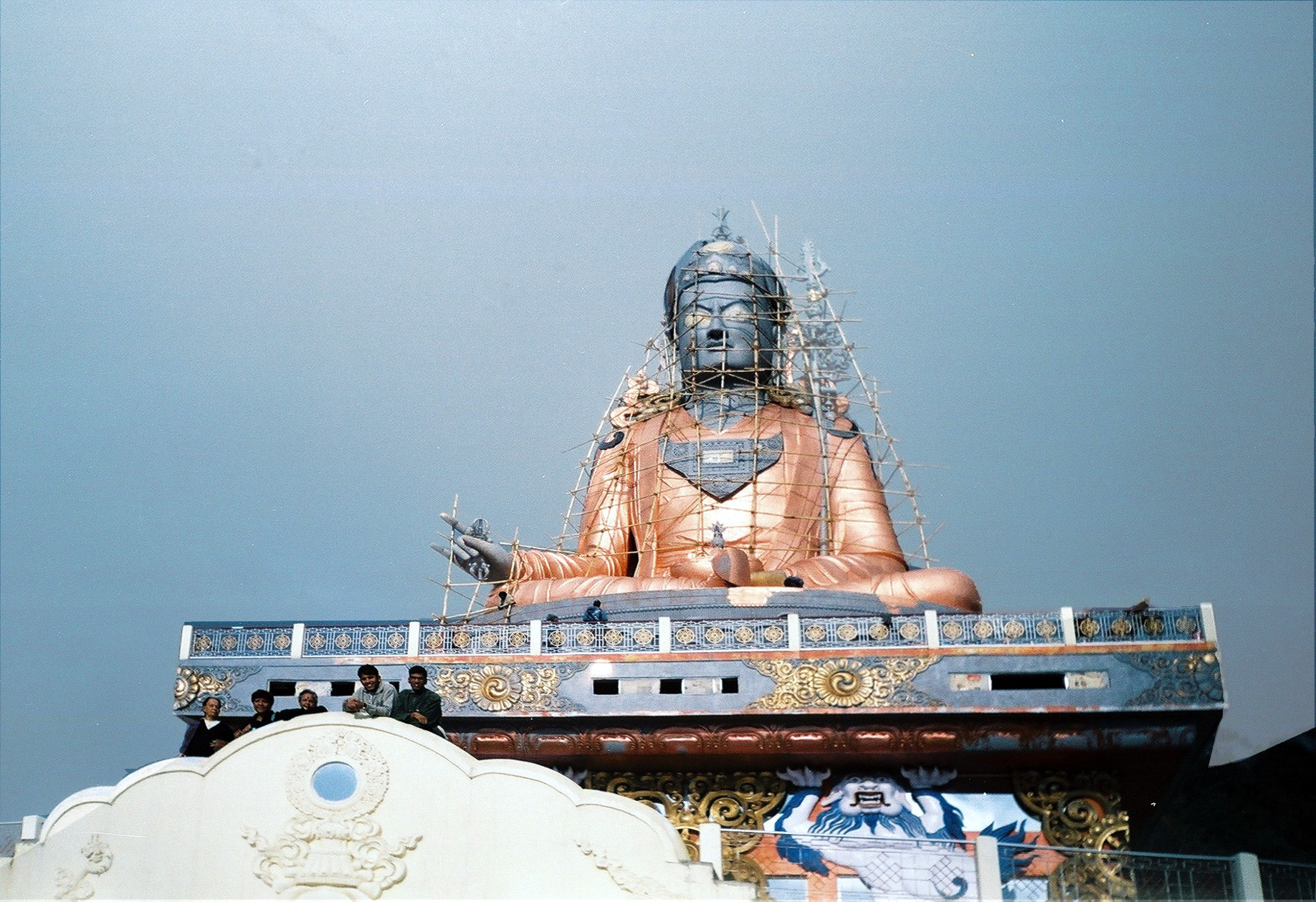
Statue of Guru Rinpoche

The history of Sikkim begins with the indigenous Lepcha's contact with early Tibetan settlers. Historically, Sikkim was a sovereign monarchical State in the eastern Himalayas. Later, a protectorate of India followed by a merger with India, and official recognition as a state of India. Lepchas were the main inhabitants as well as the Rulers of the land up to 1641. Lepchas are generally considered to be the first people, Indigenous to Sikkim.

The establishment of the Buddhist kingdom under the Chogyal in the 17th century was followed by British rule in Sikkim and thereafter inclusion in India as an official state of the nation post- independence. Sikkim emerged as a polity in its own right against a backdrop of incursions from Tibet and Bhutan, during which the kingdom enjoyed varying degrees of independence. In the early 18th century, the British Empire sought to establish trade routes with Tibet, leading Sikkim to fall under British suzerainty until independence in 1947. Initially, Sikkim remained an independent country until it merged with India in 1975. Many provisions of the Indian constitution had to be altered to accommodate the international treaties and treaties between Sikkim and India.

== Ancient history ==
=== Vedic era: Kirata people ===
According to mahabharta, the Kirati people are ancient tribes of Sikkim. According to the Hindu texts, Lord Shiva is said to have appeared in the form of hunter Kirateshwar or Lord of the Kiratas to Arjuna in the very spot where the ancient Kirateshwar temple lies in Legship, West Sikkim. Dr A. C. Singh (1983) stated that "Sikkim is known as the home of the Kirati tribesmen from the pre-historic times". When the Kirat king Yalambar captured outer Nepal in 1,500 B.C his kingdom extended from the river Trisuli in the west to the river Teesta in the east.

=== 6th-13th century CE: Lepcha migration and battles with Kirats ===
By the 6th century the Lepchas occupied the Lapchan area of Nepal (present Ilam region), present Sikkim, Har Chu Valley and Ammo Chu Valley (present South Western Bhutan) and most of Eastern part of Greater Sikkim up to the Chumbi Valley. Meanwhile, the Limbu inhabited the Western part of Greater Sikkim (present Limbuwan region). A part of Limbuwan is still retained in present Sikkim in the West district, South district and a part of North district. The Lepchas spoke the Himalayish language Lepcha, and were believers of Boongthism and Munism or Animism by faith. The Limbus spoke the Limbu language and were believers of Yumaism or Yuma Sammang, a form of Kirat Mundhum.

In the 7th century, Thekung Adek consolidated the Lepcha tribes and declared himself a Panu, a Tribal Religious and Administrative chief or king. Similarly, the Limbu tribes were ruled by 10 elected chiefs or Hangs from each of their clans to form a social and administrative body called Thibong Yakthum Tumyanghang (tribal republic council or Ten Limbus Council).

Around 870 A.D., Na Hang, the chief of Daramdin, West Sikkim, was incited by the Chilikchom people to fight against the Kirati Limbu king of Limbuwan, Mabo Hang. Na Hang was defeated, and the Chilikchom were banished from Limbuwan. Sikkim also finds mention in many Hindu texts because the Buddhist saint Guru Rinpoche or Padmasambhava is said to have passed through the land in the 9th century. According to legend, the Guru blessed the land, introduced Buddhism to Sikkim, and also foretold the era of the monarchy in the state, which would arrive centuries later.

=== 13th-17th century: local chieftains ===
There are numerous stories regarding the migration of Tibetans into Sikkim and the establishment of the Sikkimese monarchy. The most popular states that in the 13th century, Guru Tashi, a prince from the Minyak House in Kham in Eastern Tibet, had a divine revelation one night, instructing him to travel south to seek his fortunes. Guru Tashi settled down in the Chumbi Valley. The population and linguistic survey were not held during this period. Still, the region was certainly inhabited by the Lepchas, the Limbus, the Magars, and some Bhutias in the later periods.

== 17th-20th century CE: Kingdom of Sikkim ==
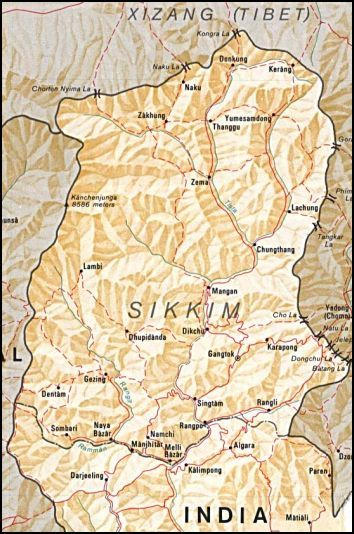
Map of Sikkim, Central Intelligence Agency, 1981.

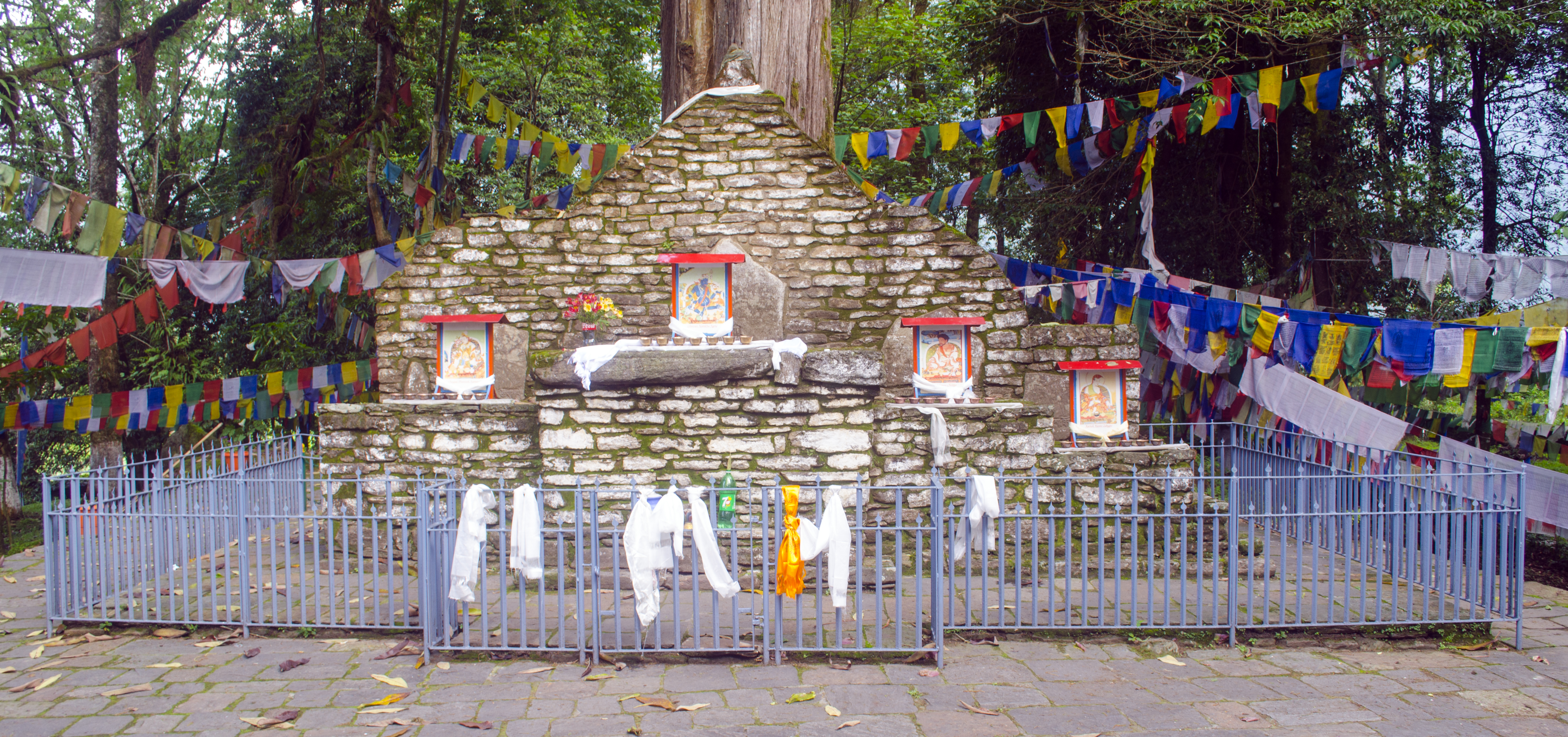
Throne of Norbuganag.

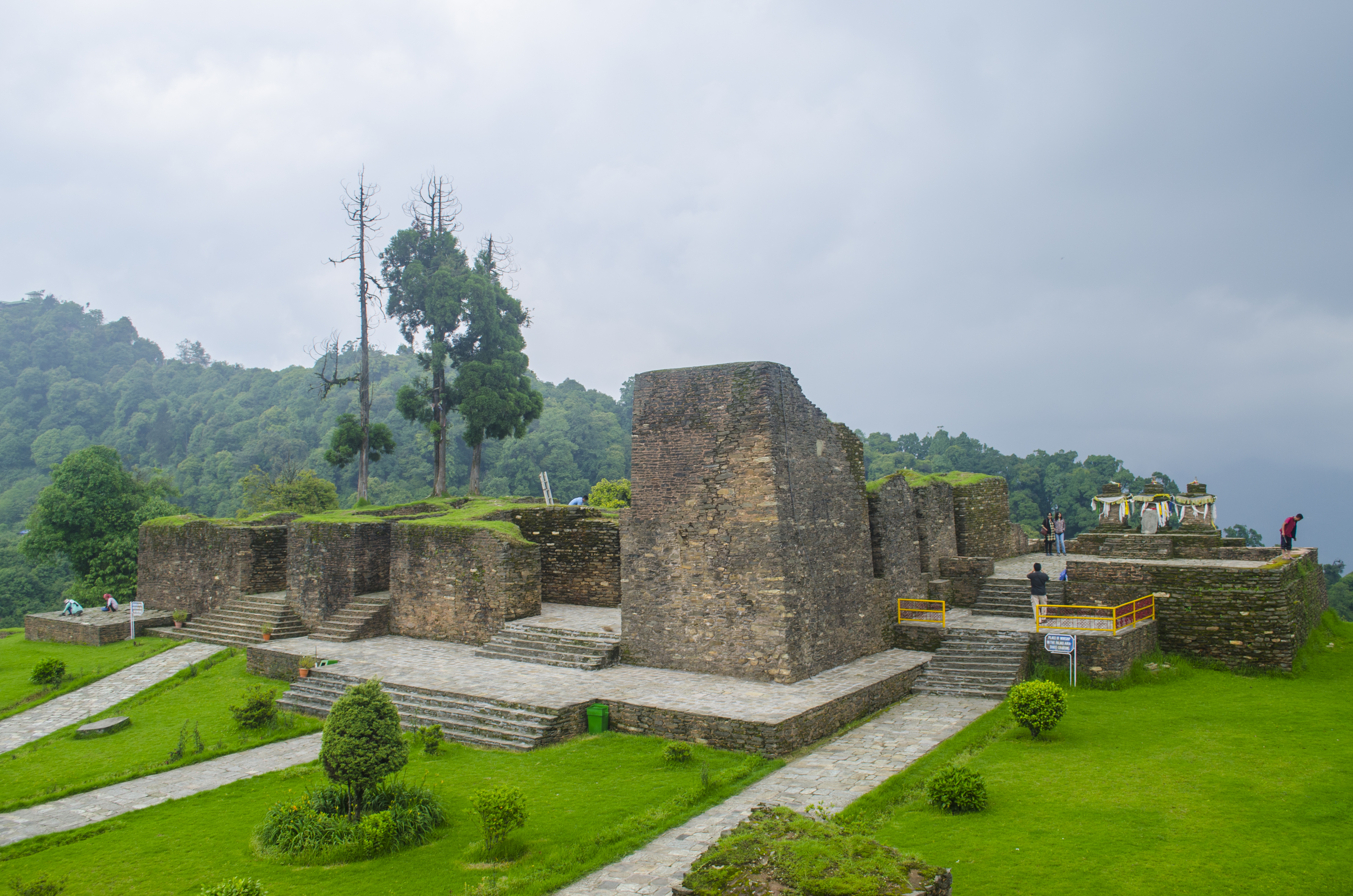
Rabdantse, ruins of the second capital of the Kingdom of Sikkim near Pelling in the present-day Gyalshing district.

By 1641, the Lepchas, the Limbus, and the Magars were ruling in different villages independently. The Limbu and the Magar tribes lived in the remote Western and Southern regions. In the early 17th century, Tibetan migrants (called "Bhutias" locally) were forced to take refuge in Sikkim due to the conflict between followers of the Yellow hat and the Red hats in Tibet. The Bhutias tried to convert the Sikkimese worshippers of nature to Tibetan Buddhism and succeeded to an extent. The Tibetan Lamas sought to establish Sikkim as a Buddhist Kingdom, thereby electing a Lhopa King of Tibetan origin.

=== 1642 CE: the first king of Sikkim ===
In 1642, the fifth generation descendant of Guru Tashi, Phuntsog Namgyal was consecrated as the first Denjong Gyalpo or the Chogyal (king) of Sikkim by Lhatsun Chhenpo, Nga-dag Lama and Kathhog Lama, three great Lamas who came from the north, west, and south to Yuksom Norbugang in West Sikkim. The event, Naljor Chezhi, was as predicted by Guru Rinpoche some eight hundred years before. The Dalai Lama sent the new Chogyal a silk scarf, the mitre of Guru Rinpoche and a sand image of him as a coronation present. However, the Magar chiefs refused to accept the rule of the Chogyal, who had to bring in Tibetan soldiers to subdue them.

This historical gathering of the three virtuous lamas is called Yuksom, which in Lepcha means 'The Place where the Three monks met,' as in Lepcha, a lama is called a "Yukmun" and the word for three is "Som". The Chogyal, along with the three lamas proselytised the Lepcha tribes into Buddhism and annexed the Chumbi Valley, the present-day Darjeeling district, and parts of today's eastern Nepal.

Shortly after his coronation, the new Chogyal appointed 12 kalon or ministers from the Bhutia community and split his kingdom into 12 Dzongs or administrative units, which each contained a fort. Individual Dzongs were headed by a Dzonga drawn from amongst the Lepchas. The lands of Sikkim were leased as gifts to Kazis and thikadars who, in turn, leased sub-plots to peasants at high rents. Mandals (headmen) and karbaris (assistants to the mandals) were employed by the kazis and thikadars as rent collectors and dispute mediators. Out of Sikkim's 104 revenue estates, 61 were leased to Kazis and thikadars for fixed sums, five were given to monasteries, and fifteen were retained by the Chogyal for his private use. The Limbu chiefs or the Subbas were also given full autonomy of their districts under the King.

Thus Phuntsog Namgyal became the first King of the Kingdom of Sikkim and all the Kirat chiefs agreed to regard him as the supreme ruler. However, the Magars did not get along with the Bhutia and left Sikkim after they were defeated in a battle. The King called all the Kirat chiefs and proclaimed that Bhutias or Lhopsas, Tsongs or the Limbus and the Mempas or the Lepchas were all part of one family known as the Lho-Mehn-Tsong with the King as the father, the Lepchas as the mother and the Limbus as the sons and they were forbidden to fight amongst themselves. The signing of this tripartite treaty of Lho-Mehn-Tsong Tsum was overseen by eight Bhutia tribal leaders, twelve Limbu tribal leaders and four Lepcha tribal leaders in present West Sikkim.

=== 1700-1800 CE: invasions from Bhutan and Nepal ===
Phuntsog Namgyal was succeeded by his son, Tensung Namgyal in 1670. The reign of this Chogyal was peaceful and saw the capital move from Yuksom to Rabdentse. Chakdor Namgyal, the king's second wife's son, took over the throne from him in 1700. This outraged his elder half-sister, Pendiongmu, who ousted him with the help of the Bhutanese. From 1700 to 1706, when Chakdor Namgyal was a minor, most parts of it were occupied by Deb Naku Zidar, the king of Bhutan. Chakdor Namgyal went into exile in Tibet. The Tibetan people subsequently expelled the Bhutanese army and called Chakdor Namgyal back to Sikkim.

Chakdor's son Gyurmed Namgyal succeeded him in 1717. Gyurmed's reign saw many skirmishes between the Nepalese and Sikkimese. Phuntsog Namgyal II, the illegitimate child of Gyurmed, succeeded his father in 1733. His reign was tumultuous in the face of attacks by the Bhutanese and the Nepalese, who managed to capture the capital Rabdentse.

Tenzing Namgyal, Chogyal from 1780 to 1793, was a weak ruler, and his sovereignty saw most of Sikkim being appropriated by Nepal. In 1788, the Nepali Gorkha Army invaded Sikkim and took Limbuana and the former capital Rabdentse by storm. The king of Sikkim went into exile in Tibet for a second time. In 1788, the 8th Dalai Lama stationed him in Chumbi Valley in Rènà zong (also "Rèrì," today's Yadong County).

His son Tshudpud Namgyal returned to Sikkim in 1793 to reclaim the throne with the help of Tibet. Finding Rabdentse too close to the Nepalese border, he shifted the capital to Tumlong.

=== 19th-21st century CE: Relations with the British Empire ===
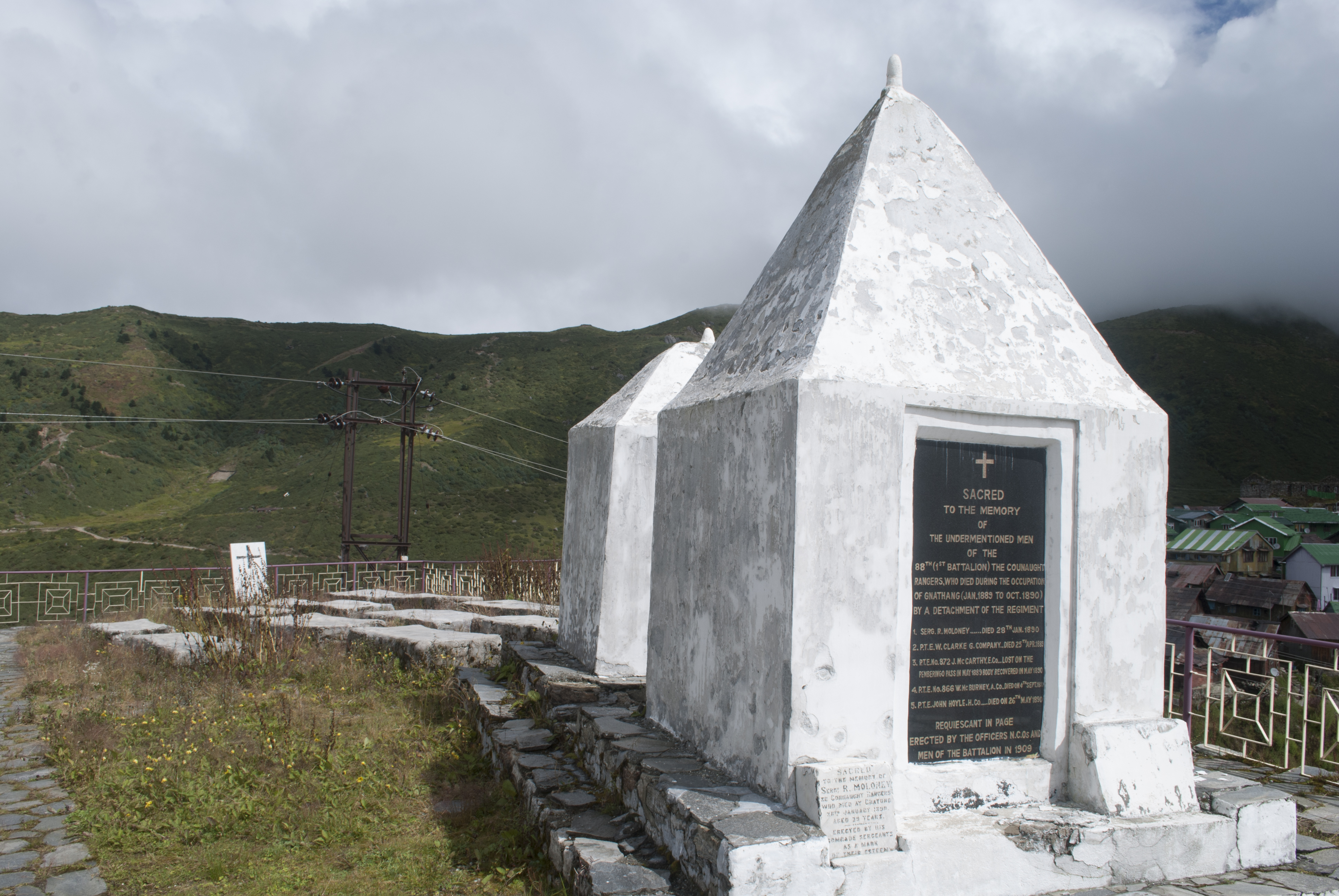
A British era war memorial in Gnathang Valley in southeastern Sikkim on India-Bhutan-Tibet tri-junction.

With the arrival of the British in neighbouring India, Sikkim allied itself with them as they had a common enemy – the Gorkha Kingdom of Nepal. The infuriated Nepalese attacked Sikkim with vengeance, overrunning most of the region, including the Terai. This prompted the British East India Company to attack Nepal, resulting in the Anglo-Nepalese War, which began in 1814. Treaties signed between the British and Nepal – the Sugauli Treaty and Sikkim and British India – Treaty of Titalia, returned the territory annexed by the Nepalese to Sikkim in 1817.

However, ties between Sikkim and India grew sour with the taxation of the area of Morang by the British. An internal disturbance, which began in 1825, gave the British the opportunity to secure the 1835 cession of Darjeeling to British Sikkim, given its perceived advantages as a sanitorium. Unhappy with this development, Sikkim's Dewan often frustrated the cessation by denying aid to the British in capturing escaped criminals and offering amnesty for escaped slaves. As compensation for the loss, the British Government paid the Sikkim Raja Rs. 3,000 from 1841 onwards, a sum that was later increased to Rs. 12,000.

In 1849, British doctor Archibald Campbell, then superintendent of Darjeeling, and botanist Joseph Hooker, ventured into the mountains of Sikkim with the permission of the British and the Chogyal of Sikkim but strayed across the Cho La into Tibet. The Sikkim government detained them at the instigation of the pro-Tibetan "mad Dewan" T. Namguey, which led to a punitive British expedition against the Himalayan kingdom. Although subsequent bloodshed was avoided, the British annexed the whole of the Darjeeling district and the Terai in 1861. In the same year, the signature of the Treaty of Tumlong effectively made Sikkim a de facto protectorate of the British.

Alongside "British Sikkim", "Independent Sikkim" continued to exist as a rump state centred around the capital at Gangtok ruling over 2,500 square miles (6,500 km^{2}) of territory. The former Chogyal was forced to abdicate in favour of his son, Sidkeong Namgyal in 1863.

The Chogyals endeavoured to modernize Sikkim in the succeeding decades, along with their army. A state visit to Darjeeling by Sidekong's half-brother, Chogyal Thutob Namgyal in 1873 failed to yield such results, and he returned to Tumlong disappointed. In 1886, the British, interested in trade with Tibet, launched a brief expedition into Sikkim. The Tibetans occupied several of Sikkim's northern border forts, and the Chogyal and his wife were held prisoner by the British when they came to negotiate at Calcutta. In 1888, the Tibetans were defeated and northern Sikkim came under the rule of British India. The British established new landholdings in Sikkim but released the Chogyal only to have him captured again in 1891. These land estates were given to Kazis, Thikadars, and Lamas. In 1894, the capital was shifted to Gangtok.

In 1895, the Chogyal was released, but the British governors in India reneged on an agreement – the Ten Clauses Agreement – which returned sovereignty to Sikkim. The Political Officer in Sikkim, John Claude White, refused to return any sovereignty and only let the Chogyal retain the judiciary of Sikkim.

In 1905, the Prince of Wales – the future King George V – arrived in Calcutta on a state visit during which he met the Chogyal. The two made an excellent acquaintance, and the Crown Prince of Sikkim, Sidkeong Tulku, was sent to study at Oxford University. When Sidkeong came to power, he arranged wider sovereignty for Sikkim from King George's government and endorsed sweeping reforms in his short rule as Chogyal, which ended in 1914. In 1918, Sikkim's independence in all domestic affairs was restored, and in the next decade, the kingdom embarked on a policy to end social ills, outlawing gambling, child labour, and indentured service.

=== 1947-1975 CE: independent monarchy ===
The Sikkimese National Flag

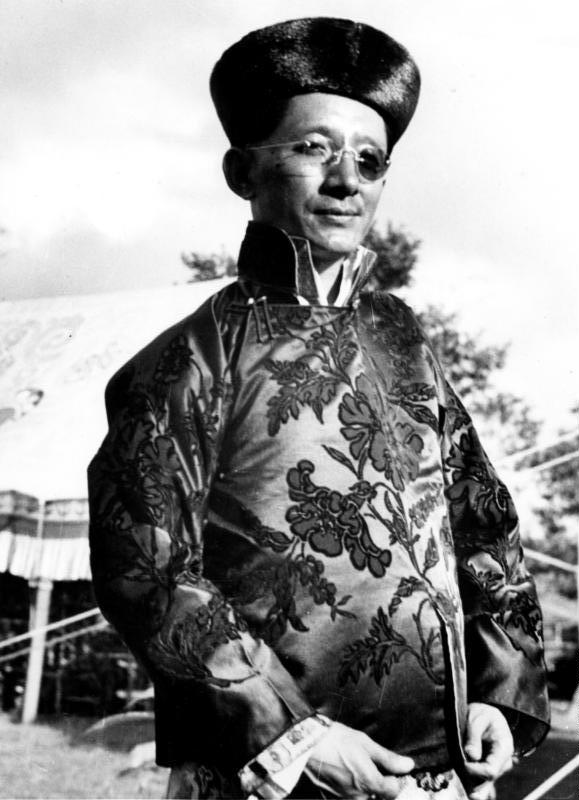
Tashi Namgyal, Chogyal of Sikkim. 1938.

Sikkim had retained guarantees of independence from Britain when it became independent, and such guarantees were transferred to the Indian government when it gained independence in 1947. A popular vote for Sikkim to join the Indian Union failed, and Indian Prime Minister Jawaharlal Nehru agreed to a special protectorate status for Sikkim. Sikkim was to be a tributary of India, in which India controlled its external defence, diplomacy, and communication. A state council was established in 1953 to allow for the constitutional government of the Chogyal, which was sustained until 1973.

In 1949, Sikkim State Congress led a state-wide agitation for democracy, leading to the formation of Sikkim's first interim government, led by Chief Minister Tashi Tshering and his popular ministry. However, the government was dismissed within 29 days.

In the 1950s, Sikkim was used by the American CIA as a base for secret operations supporting Tibetan guerrillas opposed to Chinese control of Tibet. The dramatic 1959 escape of the Dalai Lama demonstrated Sikkim's value to both India and China. Nehru said the Chumbi Valley, controlled by China, was a "dagger pointed at the heart of India." During the 1962 Sino-Indian War, Indian troops arrived to block a possible Chinese invasion; there were some skirmishes between Indian and Chinese forces. After the war, India closed the ancient pass; it reopened in 2006. The 50s and 60s marked the emergence of political parties in Sikkim, including Sikkim State Congress, Sikkim National Party, Sikkim Swatantra Dal, Sikkim Janata Party, and Sikkim National Congress.

The old ruler Tashi Namgyal died in 1963 from cancer. The last hereditary ruler, Chogyal Palden Thondup Namgyal, ascended to the throne in 1965. Trouble began to brew for the crown even before the Chogyal assumed the throne, as Nehru, who had carefully preserved Sikkim's status as an independent protectorate, died in 1964. His daughter Indira Gandhi, who became Prime Minister in 1966, had little patience for maintaining an independent Sikkim or its monarchy. The Chogyal, who responded to the increased pressure by drinking, was viewed by India as politically dangerous, especially after his wife, the American socialite Hope Cooke, advocated a return of certain former Sikkimese properties.

In December 1950, by signing the "India - Sikkim Peace Treaty", Sikkim became India's protectorate. On April 9, 1975, the Sikkim Parliament announced the king was deposed and declared Sikkim had become part of India through a referendum. On May 16, the Indian parliament announced that Sikkim officially became a state of India. Sikkim is a state in India, which currently has 6 districts. Gangtok is the largest district in terms of population, but Mangan is the largest district in terms of area.

== 1975 CE onwards: political history of Sikkim ==
The 1979 assembly election saw Nar Bahadur Bhandari elected Chief Minister of Sikkim. Bhandari held on to win again in 1984 and 1989. In 1994, Assembly politician Pawan Kumar Chamling became the Chief Minister of Sikkim. In 1999, 2004, 2009, and 2014, Chamling consolidated his position to sweep the polls. Sikkim voted for one delegate to the All India Lok Sabha on 3 January 1980. The voters strongly favoured a local listing party, rejecting the candidates from the Janata and Congress.

Sino-Indian relations were somewhat bruised in 2000 by an event in Sikkim that challenged China's longstanding claim of Sikkim as an independent country. The unusual event was the escape of Ogyen Trinley Dorje from Tibet to Dharamsala, India. Ogyen Trinley Dorje is one of the two rival claimants who seek recognition as the 17th Karmapa, the head of the Black Hat branch of Tibetan Buddhism (see Karmapa controversy). The two claimants did battle in the Indian court system for control of the considerable funds collected by the 16th Karmapa for the restoration and maintenance of Rumtek Monastery, located in Gangtok, Sikkim. The Chinese, who recognise Ogyen Trinley Dorje as the true Karmapa, were unhappy about the court outcome which awarded the monastery funds to the other rival. However, the Chinese government was in a quandary as to what to do about it, as any protest to India would mean an explicit endorsement that the high court of India holds jurisdiction over Sikkim.

In 2003, with the thawing of relations between the two nations, Indian sovereignty over Sikkim was finally recognised by China. The two governments also proposed to open the Nathula and Jelepla Passes in 2005.

On 18 September 2011, a magnitude 6.9M_{w} earthquake struck Sikkim, killing at least 116 people in the state and Nepal, Bhutan, Bangladesh and Tibet, China. More than 60 people died in Sikkim alone and the city of Gangtok suffered significant damage.

== See also ==
- Indigenous peoples of Sikkim
- Chogyal
- History of India
- History of Bhutan
- History of Nepal
- History of Tibet
