= Wangchuk Namgyal =

Tobgyal Wangchuk Tenzing Namgyal

Head of the Royal House of Sikkim
- Tenure: 29 January 1982 – present
- Predecessor: Palden Thondup Namgyal
- Born: 1 April 1953 (age 73); Gangtok, Kingdom of Sikkim
- Dynasty: Namgyal
- Father: Palden Thondup Namgyal
- Mother: Samyo Kushoe Sangideki
- Religion: Buddhism

Chogyal Wangchuk Tenzing Namgyal (Sikkimese: སྟོབས་རྒྱལ་དབང་ཕྱུག་བསྟན་འཛིན་རྣམ་རྒྱལ་; Wylie: stobs-rgyal dbang-phyug bstan-'dzin rnam-rgyal) (born 1 April 1953) is an Indian former prince who is the second son of Palden Thondup Namgyal, the last sovereign king of Sikkim. Educated at Harrow, he is also the present heir of the Namgyal dynasty and pretender to the throne of Sikkim.

On February 19, 1982, following the death of his father, he was crowned at Tsuklakhang Palace. The Government of India did not recognize this coronation, though the 3rd Chief Minister of Sikkim, B. B. Gurung, recognized him as the 13th Chogyal. Namgyal subsequently became a monastic recluse. On May 22, 2023, he joined the grand celebration of the last Chogyal Palden Thondup Namgyal's 100th birth anniversary in Gangtok.

== Honours ==
- Kingdom of Sikkim:
  - Chogyal Palden Thondup Namgyal Coronation Medal (4 April 1965).

== Ancestry ==
Ancestors of Wangchuk Namgyal

16. Tshudpud Namgyal
8. Thutob Namgyal
17. Maharani Menchi
4. Tashi Namgyal
18. Shiafe Uthok, of the Lhading House of Lhasa
9. Yeshay Dolma
2. Palden Thondup Namgyal
10. General Medrak Rakashar
5. Gyalyum Kunzang Dechen
1. Wangchuk Namgyal
6. Theiji Tsewang Rinzing Namgyal
3. Samyo Kushoe Sangideki

Wangchuk Namgyal House of Namgyal Born: 1 April 1953
Titles in pretence
Preceded by Palden Thondup Namgyal	— TITULAR — Chogyal of Sikkim; 29 January 1982 – present	Incumbent
