= Chogyal =

Monarchs of the former Kingdom of Sikkim

Chogyal of Sikkim
- Emblem of Sikkim

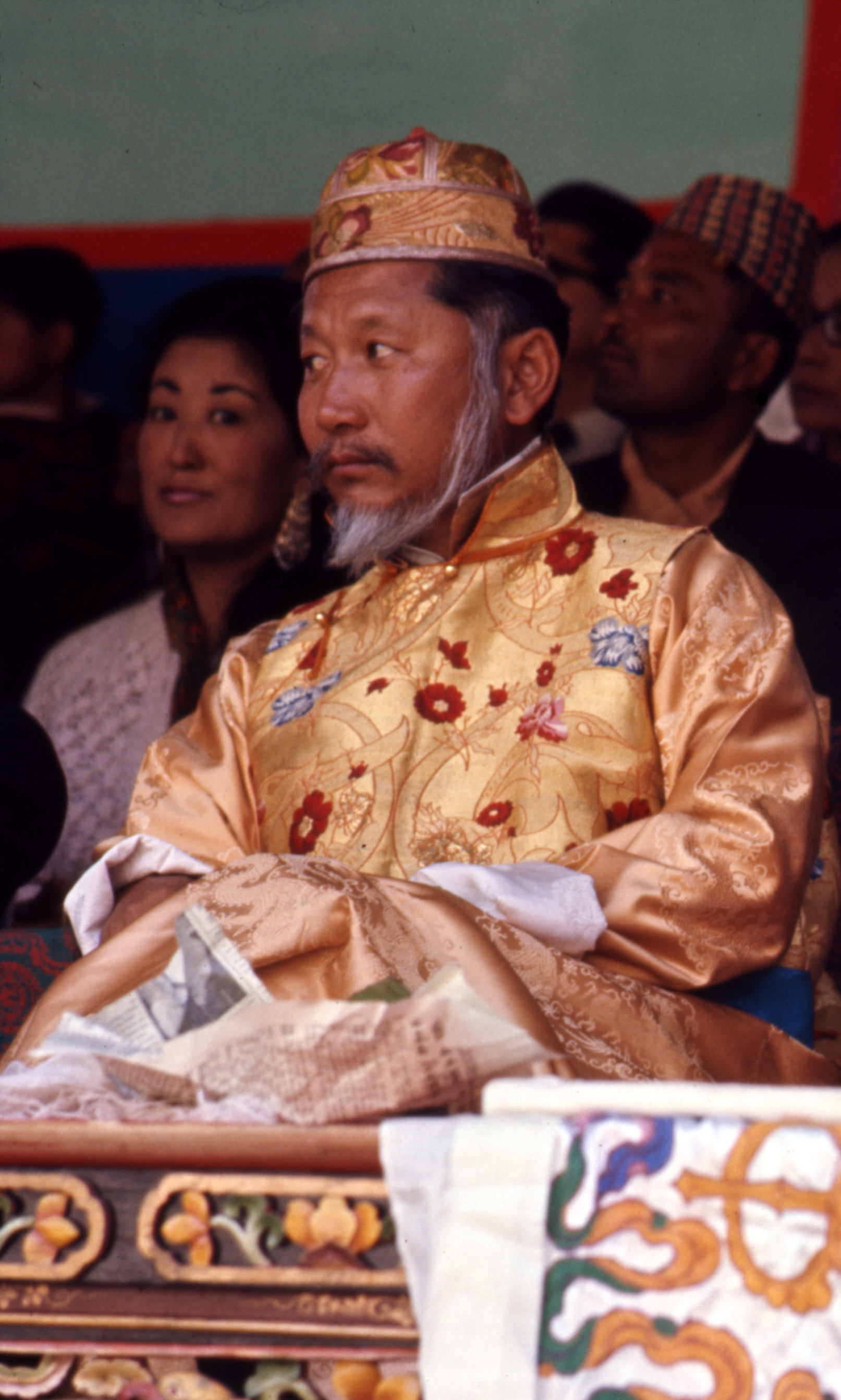
- Palden Thondup Namgyal

Details
- First monarch: Phuntsog Namgyal
- Last monarch: Palden Thondup Namgyal
- Formed: 1642; 384 years ago
- Abolished: 16 May 1975; 51 years ago
- Residences: Tsuklakhang Palace, Gangtok
- Pretender: Wangchuk Namgyal

The Chogyal ("Dharma Kings", Tibetan: ཆོས་རྒྱལ, Wylie: chos rgyal) were the monarchs of the former Kingdom of Sikkim, which belonged to the Namgyal dynasty (Tibetan: རྣམ་རྒྱལ་རྒྱལ་རབས།, Wylie: Rnam Rgyal Rgyal Rabs). The Chogyal was the absolute monarch of Sikkim from 1642 to 1973, and the constitutional monarch from 1973 to 1975, when the monarchy was abolished and the Sikkimese people voted in a referendum to make Sikkim the 22nd state of India.

== History ==
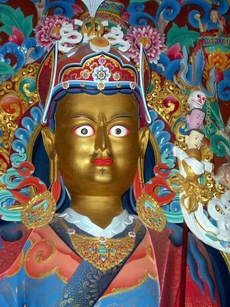
Statue of Padmasambhava or Guru Rinpoche

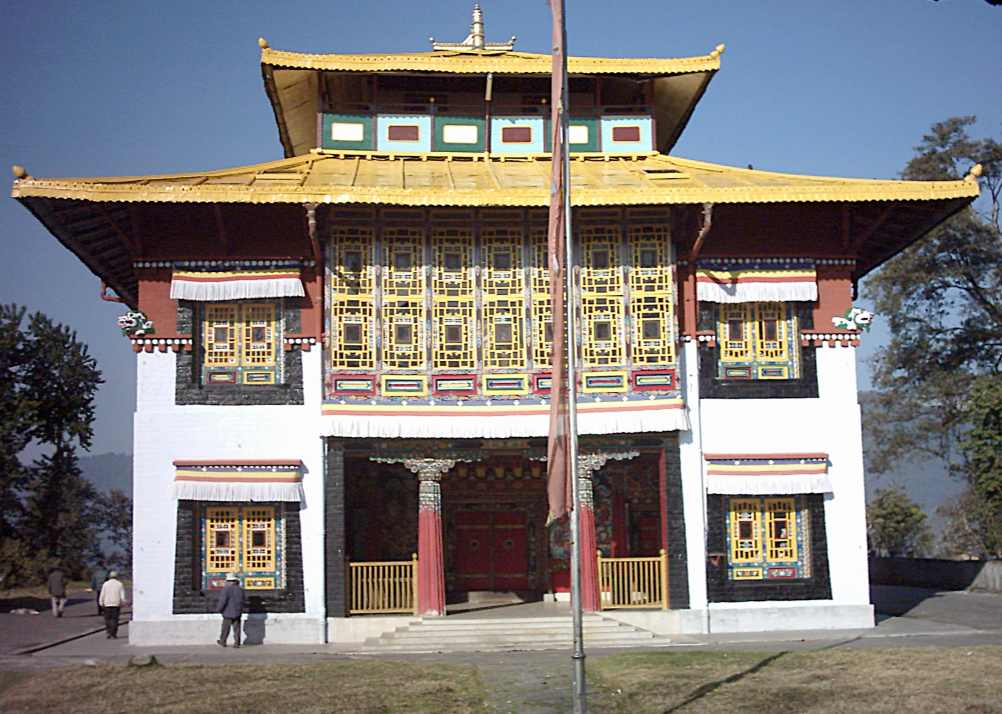
Tsuklakhang Palace

From 1642 to 1975, Sikkim was ruled by the monarchy founded by Phuntsog Namgyal, the fifth-generation descendant of Guru Tashi, a prince from the Minyak House who came to Sikkim from the Kham region of Eastern Tibet. Chogyal means 'righteous ruler', and was the title conferred upon Sikkim's Buddhist kings during the reign of the Namgyal Monarchy.

In 1642, Phuntsog Namgyal was crowned as Sikkim's first Chogyal in Yuksom. The crowning of the king was a great event and he was crowned by three revered lamas who arrived there from three different directions, namely the north, west, and south.

== Chogyal kings of Sikkim ==
=== List of chogyals ===
Name	Lifespan	Reign start	Reign end	Notes	Family	Image
Phuntsog Namgyal: 1st Chogyal; ཕུན་ཚོགས་རྣམ་རྒྱལ་	1604–1670 (aged 65–66)	1642	1670	Ascended the throne and was consecrated as the first Chogyal of Sikkim. Made the capital at Yuksom in West Sikkim.	Namgyal	Phuntsog Namgyal of Sikkim
Tensung Namgyal: 2nd Chogyal; བསྟན་སྲུང༌རྣམ་རྒྱལ་	1644–1700 (aged 55–56)	1670	1700	Son of Phuntsog Namgyal. Shifted capital from Yuksom to Rabdentse which was later destroyed by Gurkhas.	Namgyal	Tensung Namgyal of Sikkim
Chakdor Namgyal: 3rd Chogyal; ཕྱག་རྡོར་རྣམ་རྒྱལ་	1686–1716 (aged 29–30)	1700	1716	His half-sister Pendiongmu tried to dethrone Chakdor, who fled to Lhasa, but was reinstated as king with the help of Tibetans.	Namgyal	Chakdor Namgyal of Sikkim
Gyurmed Namgyal: 4th Chogyal; འགྱུར་མེད་རྣམ་རྒྱལ་	1707–1733 (aged 25–26)	1716	1733	Sikkim was attacked by Nepalis.	Namgyal	Gyurmed Namgyal of Sikkim
Phuntsog Namgyal II: 5th Chogyal; ཕུན་ཚོགས་རྣམ་རྒྱལ་	1733–1780 (aged 46–47)	1733	1780	Nepalis raided Rabdentse, the then capital of Sikkim.	Namgyal	Phuntsog Namgyal II of Sikkim
Tenzing Namgyal: 6th Chogyal; བསྟན་འཛིན་རྣམ་རྒྱལ་	1769–1793 (aged 23–24)	1780	1793	Fled to Tibet, and later died there in exile.	Namgyal	Tenzing Namgyal of Sikkim
Tsugphud Namgyal: 7th Chogyal; གཙུག་ཕུད་རྣམ་རྒྱལ་	1785–1863 (aged 77–78)	1793	1863	Son of Tenzing Namgyal. The longest-reigning Chogyal of Sikkim. Shifted the capital from Rabdentse to third capital Tumlong. Treaty of Titalia in 1817 between Sikkim and British India was signed in which territories lost to Nepal were appropriated to Sikkim. Darjeeling was gifted to British India in 1835. Two Britons, Dr. Campbell and Dr. Hooker were captured by the Sikkimese in 1849. Hostilities between Britain and Sikkim continued and led to the Treaty of Tumlong in 1861, making Sikkim a de facto British protectorate.	Namgyal	Tsugphud Namgyal of Sikkim
Sidkyong Namgyal: 8th Chogyal; སྲིད་སྐྱོང་རྣམ་རྒྱལ་	1819–1874 (aged 54–55)	1863	1874	Son of Tsugphud Namgyal.	Namgyal	Sidkeong Namgyal of Sikkim
Thutob Namgyal: 9th Chogyal; མཐུ་སྟོབས་རྣམ་རྒྱལ་	1860 – 11 February 1914 (aged 53–54)	1874	11 February 1914	Half-brother of Sidkeong Namgyal. John Claude White appointed as the first political officer in Sikkim in 1889. Capital shifted from Tumlong to fourth and last capital at Gangtok in 1894.	Namgyal	Thutob Namgyal of Sikkim
Sidkeong Tulku Namgyal: 10th Chogyal; སྲིད་སྐྱོང་སྤྲུལ་སྐུ་རྣམ་རྒྱལ་	1879 – 5 December 1914 (aged 34–35)	11 February 1914	5 December 1914	Son of Thutob Namgyal. The shortest-reigning Chogyal of Sikkim. Died of heart failure, in most suspicious circumstances.	Namgyal	Sidkeong Tulku Namgyal of Sikkim
Tashi Namgyal: 11th Chogyal; བཀྲ་ཤིས་རྣམ་རྒྱལ་	26 October 1893 – 2 December 1963 (aged 70)	5 December 1914	2 December 1963	Half-brother of Sidkeong Tulku Namgyal. The second longest-reigning Chogyal of Sikkim. Treaty between India and Sikkim was signed in 1950, giving India suzerainty over Sikkim.	Namgyal	Tashi Namgyal of Sikkim
Palden Thondup Namgyal: 12th Chogyal; དཔལ་ལྡན་དོན་འགྲུབ་རྣམ་རྒྱལ	23 May 1923 – 29 January 1982 (aged 58)	2 December 1963 (Note: Crowned on 4 April 1965.)	10 April 1975	Son of Tashi Namgyal. The last Chogyal of Sikkim. The country became a state of India, following the 1975 referendum.	Namgyal	Palden Thondup Namgyal of Sikkim

=== Titular chogyals ===
The son from the first marriage of Palden Thondup Namgyal, Wangchuk Namgyal (Sikkimese: དབང་ཕྱུག་བསྟན་འཛིན་རྣམ་རྒྱལ་; born 1 April 1953), was named the 13th Chogyal after his father's death on 29 January 1982, and crowned on 19 February 1982; the Government of India did not recognize this coronation, and the position no longer confers any official authority.

Titular chogyals (1975–present)
Name	Reign start	Reign end	Notes
Palden Thondup Namgyal	10 April 1975	29 January 1982	Son of Tashi Namgyal
Wangchuk Namgyal	29 January 1982	Incumbent	Son of Palden Thondup Namgyal

=== Family tree ===
Namgyal dynasty and the Chogyals of Sikkim

Phuntsog; Namgyal I^{(1)} r. 1642–1670
Tensung; Namgyal^{(2)} r. 1670–1700
Chakdor; Namgyal^{(3)} r. 1700–1717
Gyurmed; Namgyal^{(4)} r. 1717–1733
Phuntsog; Namgyal II^{(5)} r. 1733–1780
Tenzing; Namgyal^{(6)} r. 1780–1793
Tsugphud; Namgyal^{(7)} r. 1793–1863
Sidkeong; Namgyal^{(8)} r. 1863–1874	Thutob; Namgyal^{(9)} r. 1874–1914
Sidkeong; Tulku; Namgyal^{(10)} r. 1914	Tashi; Namgyal^{(11)} r. 1914–1963
Palden; Thondup; Namgyal^{(12)} r. 1963–1975 – Titular – r. 1975–1982
Wangchuk; Namgyal^{(13)} – Titular – r. 1982–present

=== Royal flag ===
Royal flag of Sikkim 1877–1975

== See also ==
- Dharmaraja
- Devaraja
- Garpön
- History of Sikkim
- History of Ladakh
