= B. B. Gurung =

Chief Minister of Sikkim, India (1929–2022)

3rd Chief Minister of Sikkim
- In office 11 May 1984 – 24 May 1984
- Governor: Homi J. H. Taleyarkhan
- Preceded by: Nar Bahadur Bhandari
- Succeeded by: Nar Bahadur Bhandari
- Constituency: Chakhung and Jorethang

Executive Council of Sikkim
- In office 1967–1970
- Monarch: Palden Thondup Namgyal
- Constituency: West

Personal details
- Born: Bhim Bahadur Gurung; 11 October 1929 Chakhung, West Sikkim, Sikkim
- Died: 28 March 2022 (aged 92)
- Party: Sikkim National Congress, Sikkim Janata Party

Bhim Bahadur Gurung (11 October 1929 – 28 March 2022) was the third Chief Minister of Sikkim. He held office from 11 May until 24 May 1984, the shortest term in the history of Sikkim.

== Personal life ==
Gurung was born on 11 October 1929 at Chakhung village in West Sikkim. He matriculated from St. Roberts School in Darjeeling. After his graduation from the University of Calcutta, he served as a teacher from 1953 to 1955. For a short period of time, he also worked as a staff reporter for the Calcutta-based newspaper Amrita Bazar Patrika. He also edited the first news-based Nepali Journal of Sikkim, called Kanchenjunga.

== Political career ==
Gurung's political career commenced with his membership of the Sikkim Rajya Congress, which had been formed in December 1947, and of which he was to become General Secretary in 1958. In 1967, Gurung was elected as Executive Councillor(equivalent to cabinet minister) by L.D. Kazi's Sikkim Rashtriya Congress and remained in the party until 1971.

Initially he demanded Sikkim’s merger with India in view of tensions with China on Sikkimese borders.In a change to his previous ideological stand of Sikkim’s merger with India, in 1967, Gurung, Nahakul Pradhan and Netuk Tshering demanded revision of Indo-Sikkim treaty,1950 stating, "Since Sikkim signed the treaty with India, surely it is within her sovereign rights to demand a revision of the treaty as one of the signatories. In fact, Sikkim gained her Sovereign Status on the 15th August, 1947, when India achieved her independence from the British rule. Every country has its inherent right to exist and maintain its separate identity and, therefore, to review and revise its treaty obligations in the wake of changing circumstances."

He was a very strong supporter of the democratic movement in Sikkim. After 1973 Sikkimese general election amid allegations of vote rigging in South Sikkim in which pro monarchy Sikkim National Party emerged as the single largest party due to inequalities of the electoral system the two main opposition Kazi led Sikkim National Congress and Sikkim Janata Congress boycotted the Executive Council and began fresh agitation for electoral reforms under "One Man One Vote" principle. Chogyal arrested Janata Congress President KC Pradhan on 27 March 1973. This led to mass protests against the Chogyal in Gangtok. A Joint Action Committee(JAC) was formed between Sikkim National Congress and Sikkim Janata Congress intensifying the agitation in Sikkim. During this, the three senior most leaders of JAC Pradhan, Kazi Lhendup Dorjee and B. B. Gurung were given shelter at the office of Indian Political Officer.

After Sikkim merged with India in 1975, Gurung was elected in the 1st Vidhan Sabha in 1977 as a candidate of the Sikkim National Congress. Consequently, he was appointed speaker of the Sikkim Legislative Assembly in 1977 and he remained speaker until 1979. In May 1984, Nar Bahadur Bhandari's government was dismissed by then-governor Homi J. H. Taleyarkhan. Shortly thereafter, Gurung was sworn in as the third Chief Minister of Sikkim. However, due to lack of support, governmental instability, and his recognition of Wangchuk Namgyal as Chogyal (his father, Palden Thondup Namgyal, was deposed seven years earlier, and Sikkim voted to join India), Gurung's government was dissolved and a presidential system implemented in the state.

2013–14 Gurung was a political advisor to the Chief Minister of Sikkim. In 2014 election he resigned and disassociated with Pawan Chamling and extended his support towards Sikkim Krantikari Morcha party. In 2019 general elections through a press statement he appealed to people of Sikkim to vote for Sikkim Krantikari Morcha which formed the government in Sikkim. Later, he was not in active politics.
