= Tashi Namgyal =

Chogyal of Sikkim from 1914 to 1963

- Chogyal
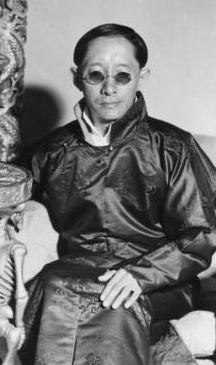
- Tashi Namgyal in 1938

Chogyal of Sikkim
- Reign: 5 December 1914 – 2 December 1963
- Predecessor: Sidkeong Tulku
- Successor: Palden Thondup Namgyal
- Born: 26 October 1893; Tibet, Qing dynasty
- Died: 2 December 1963 (aged 70); Gangtok, Kingdom of Sikkim
- Spouse: Kunzang Dechen
- Issue: Paljor Namgyal. Palden Thondup Namgyal; Jigdal Tsewang Namgyal. Sem Kude Pema Tsedeun. Sem Kushon Pema Choki.
- House: Namgyal dynasty
- Father: Thutob Namgyal
- Mother: Yeshay Dolma
- Religion: Buddhism
- Military career
- Allegiance: Kingdom of Sikkim
- Service years: 1914–1963

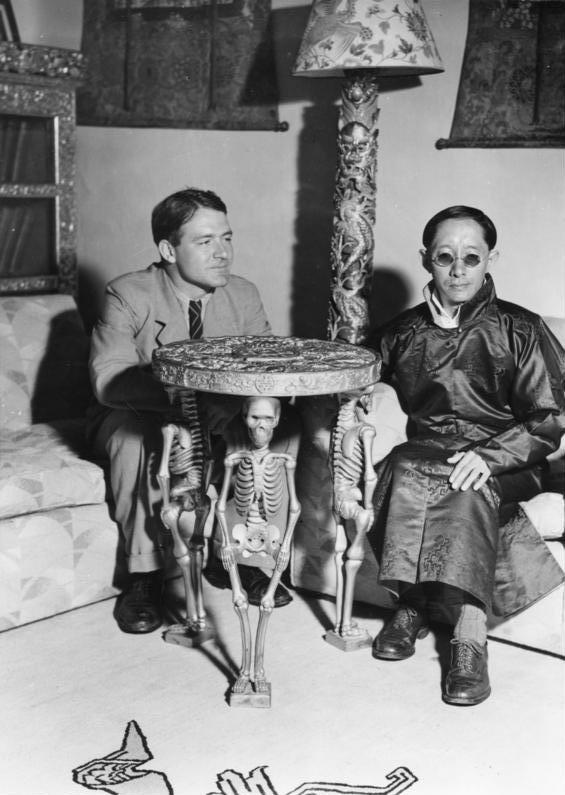
Tashi Namgyal pictured with SS-Sturmbannführer Ernst Schäfer, leader of the 1938–1939 German expedition to Tibet

Tashi Namgyal (Sikkimese: བཀྲ་ཤིས་རྣམ་རྒྱལ་; Wylie: Bkra-shis Rnam-rgyal) (26 October 1893 – 2 December 1963) was the ruling Chogyal (King) of Sikkim from 1914 to 1963. He was the son of Thutob Namgyal. He was the first independent king of Sikkim.

== Biography ==
Namgyal was the 11th ruler of the Namgyal dynasty of Sikkim, succeeding his half brother Sidkeong Tulku Namgyal, who had ruled from February to December 1914 - when he died, suddenly, under mysterious circumstances. Born in Tibet and crowned by the 13th Dalai Lama, Thubten Gyatso, he was a strong advocate for closer links with India.

He was educated in St. Paul's School, Darjeeling. He has married in October 1918 to Kunzang Dechen, and they had 3 sons and 3 daughters. The eldest son died in a plane crash during World War Two. On his death he was succeeded as Chogyal by his second son Palden Thondup Namgyal.

During his reign, he was known for land reform and free elections. He also favoured closer links between Sikkim, India and Tibet. Many people attribute his death to Indian agents.

About a decade after his death, his son Palden Thondup Namgyal, the incumbent hereditary Chogyal, was formally deposed. Prime Minister Lendup Dorji appealed to India to change the status of Sikkim from protectorate to statehood. On 16 May 1975, Sikkim was officially made the 22nd state of India.

== Honours ==
- Delhi Durbar Medal, 11 December 1911.
- CIE: Companion of the Order of the Indian Empire, 1 January 1918.
- KCIE: Knight Commander of the Order of the Indian Empire, 1 January 1923.
- King George V Silver Jubilee Medal, 6 May 1935.
- King George VI Coronation Medal, 12 May 1937.
- KCSI: Knight Commander of the Order of the Star of India, 8 June 1939.

== Ancestry ==
Ancestors of Tashi Namgyal

8. Tenzing Namgyal, 6th Maharaja of Sikkim
4. Tsugphud Namgyal, 7th Maharaja of Sikkim
9. Anyo Karwang
2. Sir Thutob Namgyal, 9th Maharaja of Sikkim
5. Maharani Menchi
1. Tashi Namgyal, 11th Maharaja of Sikkim
6. Shiafe Uthok, of the Lhading House of Lhasa
3. Yeshay Dolma

== See also ==
- Tashi Namgyal Academy

Tashi Namgyal Namgyal Dynasty Born: 26 October 1893 Died: 2 December 1963
Regnal titles
Preceded by Sidkeong Tulku Namgyal	Chogyal of Sikkim; 1914–1963	Succeeded by Palden Thondup Namgyal
