= Sidkeong =

Sidkeong (also Sridkyong or Srid-kyong) is a given name. Notable people with the name include:

- Sidkeong Namgyal (1819–1874), king of Sikkim 1863–1874
- Sidkeong Tulku Namgyal (1879–1914), Chogyal of Sikkim in 1914
