= Guru Tashi =

ZhalNga Guru Tashi (Tibetan: ཞལ་ལྔ་གུ་རུ་བཀྲ་ཤིས, Wylie: Zhal Lnga gu ru bkra shis) was a 13th-century prince from the Minyak House of the Kham region of Eastern Tibet. According to legend, he had a divine revelation one night instructing him to travel south to seek his fortunes.

He travelled south to the present day Indian state of Sikkim. His descendants, beginning with Phuntsog Namgyal, were later to form the royal family of the Kingdom of Sikkim, known as the Chogyal Monarchy, which ruled from 1642 to 1975.
