= Tenzing Namgyal =

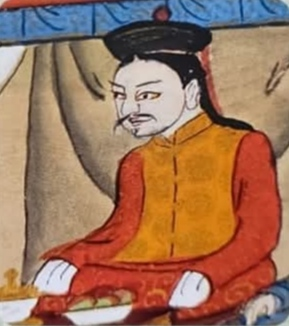

Chogyal of Sikkim
- Reign: 1780 – 1793
- Predecessor: Phuntsog Namgyal II
- Successor: Tsugphud Namgyal
- Born: 1769
- Died: 1793 (aged 23–24)
- Spouse: Anyo Karwang
- Issue: Tsugphud Namgyal
- House: Namgyal dynasty
- Father: Phuntsog Namgyal II
- Religion: Buddhism

Tenzing Namgyal (Sikkimese: བསྟན་འཛིན་རྣམ་རྒྱལ་; Wylie: bstan 'dzin rnam rgyal) was the sixth Chogyal (king) of Sikkim. He succeeded Phuntsog Namgyal II in 1780 and was succeeded himself by Tsugphud Namgyal in 1793.

In 1775, possibly with Bhutanese support, Sikkim was invaded by the ascendant Gorkha Empire, Tibet mediated a peace treaty between Nepal and Sikkim that forbade the Gorkhas from collaborating with the Bhutanese or making any moves against Sikkim. In 1778, the Nepalese ruler Pratap Singh Shah broke the terms of the treaty and attacked Sikkim. The Nepalese would occupy Sikkim for four years, annexing a considerable part of its western territories, and the Chogyal was exiled to Tibet for the remainder of his reign. Following the Sino-Nepalese War, the 1792 peace treaty forced the Gorkhas to leave Sikkim, though the lost western territories were not restored (though the 1817 Treaty of Titalia would return some lands to Sikkim, establishing the current Nepalese-Sikkimese border) and Sikkim additionally ceded the Chumbi Valley to Tibet, though the Sikkimese retained estates there.

Tenzing Namgyal Namgyal Dynasty Born: 1769 Died: 1793
Regnal titles
Preceded by Phuntsog Namgyal II	Chogyal of Sikkim; 1780–1793	Succeeded by Tsugphud Namgyal
