= Gyurmed Namgyal =

4th chogyal of Sikkim (1707–1733)

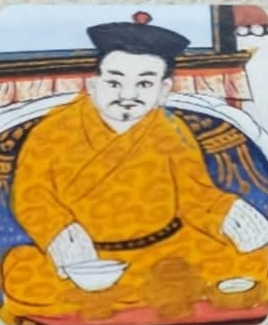

Chogyal of Sikkim
- Reign: 1716 – 1733
- Predecessor: Chakdor Namgyal
- Successor: Phuntsog Namgyal II
- Born: 1707
- Died: 1733 (aged 25–26)
- Issue: Phuntsog Namgyal II
- House: Namgyal dynasty
- Father: Chakdor Namgyal
- Religion: Buddhism

Gyurmed Namgyal (Sikkimese: འགྱུར་མེད་རྣམ་རྒྱལ་; Wylie: 'gyur med rnam rgyal) was the fourth Chogyal (king) of Sikkim. He succeeded Chakdor Namgyal in 1716 and was succeeded by Phuntsog Namgyal II in 1733.

During his reign, Limbuana rebelled and broke off from Sikkim. During his reign, Sikkim's borders were frequently raided by Bhutanese and Nepalese. Shortly before his death, Gyurmed revealed that a nun at Sanga Choeling Monastery had borne him a son, who was to be his successor.

Gyurmed Namgyal Namgyal Dynasty Born: 1707 Died: 1733
Regnal titles
Preceded by Chakdor Namgyal	Chogyal of Sikkim; 1716–1733	Succeeded by Phuntsog Namgyal II
