= Chakdor Namgyal =

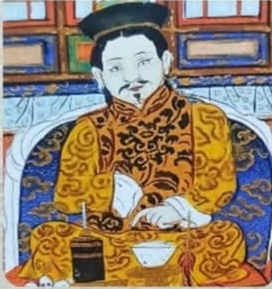

Chogyal of Sikkim
- Reign: 1700 – 1716
- Predecessor: Tensung Namgyal
- Successor: Gyurmed Namgyal
- Born: 1686
- Died: 1716 (aged 29–30)
- Issue: Gyurmed Namgyal
- House: Namgyal dynasty
- Father: Tensung Namgyal
- Mother: Debasam-serpa
- Religion: Buddhism

Chakdor Namgyal (Sikkimese: ཕྱག་དོར་རྣམ་རྒྱལ་; Wylie: phyag dor rnam rgyal) was the third Chogyal (king) of Sikkim. He succeeded Tensung Namgyal in 1700 and was succeeded himself by Gyurmed Namgyal in 1716.

In the first year of Chakdor's reign, his half-sister and regent Pende Ongmu tried to dethrone Chakdor, who fled to Lhasa, but was reinstated as king with the help of Tibetans. She contacted the Deb Raja of Bhutan to send a force into Sikkim to assassinate Chakdor, but Yugthing Tishey, a minister in Chakdor's court, learned of the plot before the Bhutanese arrival and entrusted the Dragkarpa brothers to escort Chakdor to safety in Tibet via Limbuana. The Bhutanese would occupy Sikkim until 1708. During the invasion, Yugthing Arub, Chakdor's half-brother and treasury minister, was captured and taken to Bhutan, where the Deb Raja blamed him for Chakdor's escape, and planned to sentence him to death, until Arub gained his favor through spirituality.

During his exile in Tibet, Chakdor was under the protection of the sixth Dalai Lama, Gyalwa Tsangyang Gyatso, who granted him estates in Shigatse and Yamdoktso and focused himself on Buddhist religious studies. While in Tibet, Chakdor married two Tibetan women, one of whom bore his son Gyurmed. Tibet eventually created a peace between Sikkim and Bhutan, and Chakdor and his court could return, but Sikkim lost areas east of the Teesta River, which had been fully integrated into Bhutan.

Sometime after 1712, a dispute emerged between Tibet and Bhutan, and expected Sikkimese assistance. Chakdor, who was ill at the time, failed to meet the Tibetan regent, Gyalpo Lhabzang, and his force at Phari, and the representative he sent failed to arrive, which the Tibetans interpreted as a betrayal, and confiscated the estates previously given to Chakdor. In response, the Sikkimese, stopped paying tribute to Tibet, and the Tibetans threatened military action in response. Samduk Lingpa, a Tibetan general from Tsang successfully defused the situation before Tibet could invade Sikkim. The estates were returned and the Sikkimese resumed paying tribute to Lhasa.

In 1716, after the consecration of Silnon monastery, Chakdor retired to the Ralang hot springs. Pende once again used this an opportunity to try and usurp the throne. She hired a Tibetan doctor to tend to Chakdor at Ralang, who, after gaining his trust, convinced him of the necessity of bloodletting, and began to bleed the Chogyal to death. Lama Jigme Pao, a good friend of Chakdor who had helped settle the conflict with Tibet, found the Chogyal in his last moments, lancet still in his arm, and after his death, secretly took the body back to Rabdentse. Jigme Pao told the court that the Chogyal was in seclusion, before breaking the news of his death after a week. It was soon found out what had happened, and both Pende and the Tibetan doctor were executed.

Chakdor Namgyal Namgyal Dynasty Born: 1686 Died: 1716
Regnal titles
Preceded by Tensung Namgyal	Chogyal of Sikkim; 1700–1716	Succeeded by Gyurmed Namgyal
