= Emblem of Sikkim =

- Armiger: Government of Sikkim
- Adopted: 1877; 149 years ago
- Crest: Right-turning conch
- Shield: a lotus within an orle of 12 annulets
- Supporters: Dragons
- Motto: ༄༅།ཁམས་གསུམ་དབང་འདུས། Kham-sum-wangdu (Conqueror of the three worlds)
- Designer: Robert Taylor
- Families: House of Namgyal (1877–1975)

The Emblem of Sikkim is currently used as the official seal of the Government of Sikkim, India. It was earlier used as the coat of arms of the House of Namgyal and the Kingdom of Sikkim. The emblem is known as the Kham-sum-wangdu. It was designed in 1877 by Robert Taylor.

== Symbolism ==
The blazon consists of a lotus within a chain of 12 annulets. The lotus is a symbol of purity and a lotus throne is a symbol of the attainment of enlightenment. It is also a symbol of administrative power. Lotus thrones are the pedestal for most important figures in Buddhist art.

== Historical emblems ==
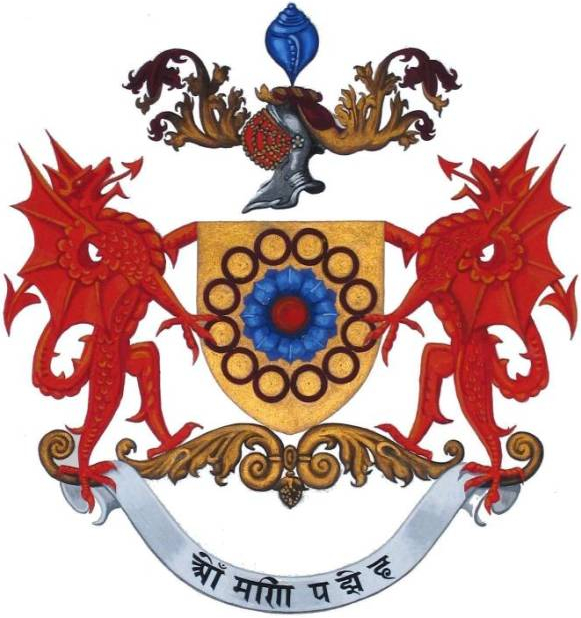
Before 1975, the motto on the coat of arms was different - OM MANI PADME HUM. (Oh, the jewel of creation is in the Lotus).

== Government Banner ==
The Government of Sikkim can be represented by a banner that depicts the emblem of the state on a white background.

Banner of Sikkim

== See also ==
- Flag of Sikkim
- National Emblem of India
- List of Indian state emblems
