= Sidkeong Namgyal =

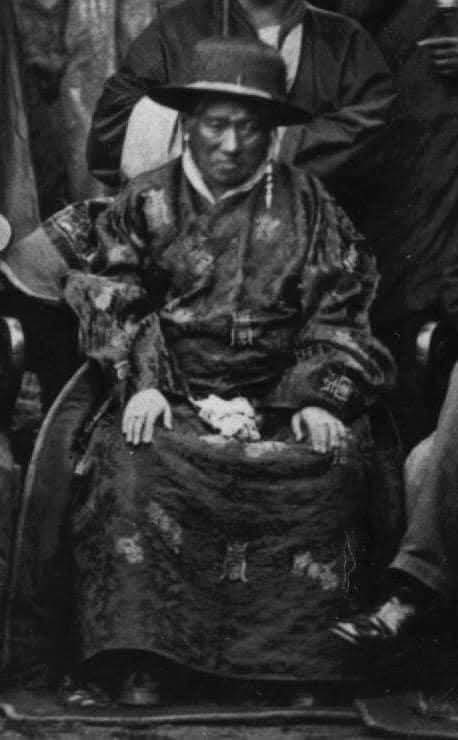
- Chogyal Sidkeong Namgyal in Darjeeling

Chogyal of Sikkim
- Reign: 1863 – 1874
- Predecessor: Tsugphud Namgyal
- Successor: Thutob Namgyal
- Born: 1819
- Died: 1874 (aged 54–55)
- House: Namgyal dynasty
- Father: Tsugphud Namgyal
- Religion: Buddhism

Sidkeong Namgyal (Sikkimese: སྲིད་སཀྱོང་རྣམ་རྒྱལ་; Wylie: srid skyong rnam rgyal) (1819–1874) was king of Sikkim from 1863 to 1874. He was son of Tsugphud Namgyal and was succeeded by his half-brother Thutob Namgyal.

His mother was the second wife of his father, a Tibetan lady, sister of the Tashi Lama.

It was Sidkeong Namgyal who signed the Treaty of Tumlong with the British in 1861, his father having abdicated rather than return to surrender to the force of Sir Ashley Eden.

Sidkeong Namgyal Namgyal Dynasty Born: 1819 Died: 1874
Regnal titles
Preceded by Tsugphud Namgyal	Chogyal of Sikkim; 1863–1874	Succeeded by Thutob Namgyal
