= Tensung Namgyal =

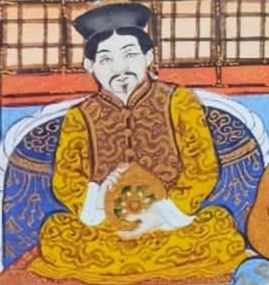

Chogyal of Sikkim
- Reign: 1670–1700
- Predecessor: Phuntsog Namgyal
- Successor: Chakdor Namgyal
- Born: 1644
- Died: 1700 (aged 55–56)
- Spouse: Numbe Ongmu; Debasam-serpa; Thungwamukma
- Issue: Pende Ongmu; Chakdor Namgyal; Shalngo-Guru; Pende Tshering Gyemu
- House: Namgyal dynasty
- Father: Phuntsog Namgyal
- Religion: Buddhism

Tensung Namgyal (Sikkimese: བསྟན་སྲུང༌རྣམ་རྒྱལ་; Wylie: bstan srung rnam rgyal) (1644–1700) was the second Chogyal (monarch) of Sikkim. He succeeded his father Phuntsog Namgyal in 1670 and moved the capital from Yuksom to Rabdentse near Geyzing. He had three wives who were Nambi Onmo from Bhutan, Lhacham Pema Putik from Tibet, and Thungwamukma, a Limbu princess from the Arun valley. After establishing Rabdentse as his new capital, he built a palace and asked his Limbu Queen to name it. She named it "Song Khim" which in the Limbu language means "New Palace". This later went on to become "Sukhim" and "Sikkim". He was succeeded by his son Chakdor Namgyal, borne by his second wife in 1700. He had one last son with his third wife. Though he is not well known, his grandson becomes a king of a small kingdom inside his father's rule.

Tensung had an affair with Numbong, a Lepcha noblewoman married to Tasa Aphong, a prominent Lepcha tumyang (village leader), who had a son by him named Yugthing Arub, who would become Sikkim's treasury official during the reign of Tensung's son, Chakdor. Yugthing would later be captured by Bhutanese forces during their invasion of Sikkim in the early 1700s, but gained the respect of the Bhutanese Deb Raja. His descendants, the Barphungpas, would become a significant clan of the Sikkimese aristocracy.

Tensung Namgyal Namgyal Dynasty Born: 1644 Died: 1700
Regnal titles
Preceded by Phuntsog Namgyal	Chogyal of Sikkim; 1670–1700	Succeeded by Chakdor Namgyal
