= Flag of Sikkim =

Former national flag

At present there is no official flag of Sikkim, a state in India. The independent Kingdom of Sikkim did have a national flag until it became a state of India in 1975.

== Prior to 1877 ==
Before 1877, during the Nepalese-Bhutanese suzerainty and as a protectorate of Tibet, several Nepalese, Bhutanese and Tibetan banners were flown in Sikkim until 1816, when the United Kingdom took control of the country and flown the Union Jack until 1877, when the first Sikkimese flag was adopted.

== Kingdom of Sikkim (1877–1975) ==
The Kingdom of Sikkim had used several flags during its history. They all contained a Buddhist khorlo prayer wheel with the gankyil as the central element.

Until 1967, the previous flag showed a very complex design with a fanciful border and religious pictograms surrounding the khorlo.

A more simple design was adopted in 1967 because of the difficulty in duplication of the complex flag. The border became solid red, the pictograms were removed and the wheel was redesigned.

With the admission of Sikkim to the Republic of India and with the abolition of the monarchy, the flag lost its official status in 1975.

Reconstruction of the Sikkimese royal flag from 1877 to 1975

Reconstruction of the Sikkimese flag from 1877 to 1914 and from 1962 to 1967

Reconstruction of the Sikkimese flag from 1914 to 1962

Flag of Sikkim used between 1967 and 1975

== State of India (1975–present) ==
The Government of Sikkim can be represented by a banner that depicts the emblem of the state on a white background.

Government banner of Sikkim

== See also ==
- Emblem of Sikkim
- National flag of India
- List of Indian state flags
