= Tsugphud Namgyal =

Chogyal of Sikkim from 1793 to 1863

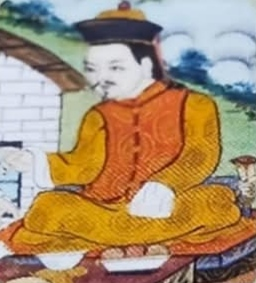
- Illustration of Tsugphud Namgyal

Chogyal of Sikkim
- Reign: 1793–1863
- Predecessor: Tenzing Namgyal
- Successor: Sidkeong Namgyal
- Born: 1785
- Died: 1863 (aged 77–78)
- Spouse: Maharani Menchi
- Issue: Sidkeong Namgyal; Thutob Namgyal
- House: Namgyal dynasty
- Father: Tenzing Namgyal
- Mother: Gyalyum Anyo
- Religion: Buddhism

Tsugphud Namgyal (Sikkimese: གཙུག་ཕུད་རྣམ་རྒྱལ་; Wylie: gtsug phud rnam rgyal) (1785–1863) was king of Sikkim from 1793 to 1863. He gained independence from Nepal in 1815 and ruled under a British protectorate from 1861.

Under his father Tenzing Namgyal, most of Sikkim was appropriated by Nepal. Tshudpud Namgyal returned to Sikkim in 1793 to reclaim the throne. Because the capital of Rabdentse was too close to the Nepalese border, he shifted the capital to Tumlong. His mother was Gyalyum Anyo, a daughter of Chandzod Karwang.

Sikkim allied itself with the British in India, who also considered Nepal an enemy. Nepal overran most of the region, sparking the Gurkha War in 1814 with the British East India Company. The Sugauli Treaty and Treaty of Titalia returned the annexed territory to Sikkim in 1817.

In 1835, Tsugphud Namgyal ceded Darjeeling to the East India Company for an annual fee, but this relationship was broken off after he seized botanist Joseph Hooker and Darjeeling Superintendent Archibald Campbell during their expedition to Sikkim. This led to two British military expeditions in 1850 and 1861, resulting in the annexation of Sikkim by 1861. Under the Treaty of Tumlong signed by his successor Sidkeong Namgyal in the same year, Tsugphud was granted the title of Maharaja of Sikkim by the British, and he abdicated the following year. At his death in 1863, aged 78, he had ruled Sikkim for 69 years, making him the longest-reigning Chogyal in history as well as the oldest ever Chogyal of Sikkim.

Tsugphud Namgyal Namgyal Dynasty Born: 1785 Died: 1863
Regnal titles
Preceded by Tenzing Namgyal	Chogyal of Sikkim; 1793–1863	Succeeded by Sidkeong Namgyal
