= Treaty of Tumlong =

Treaty established Sikkim as a de facto protectorate of the British Indian government

- Signed: March 1861; 165 years ago
- Location: Tumlong
- Condition: made Sikkim a "de facto" protectorate of the British Empire
- Signatories: Sir Ashley Eden for British Empire and Sidkeong Namgyal for Sikkim
- Parties: British Empire Sikkim
- Language: English

The Treaty of Tumlong, also known as the Anglo-Sikkimese Treaty of 1861, was a March 1861 treaty between the British Empire and the Kingdom of Sikkim in present-day north-east India. Signed by Sir Ashley Eden on behalf of the British and by the Sikkimese Chogyal, Sidkeong Namgyal when his father Tsugphud Namgyal refused to return from Tibet, the treaty secured protection for travellers to Sikkim and guaranteed free trade, thereby making the state a de facto British protectorate.

== Background ==
The East India Company (EIC) had gradually made inroads into neighbouring India and shared a common enemy with Sikkim - the Gorkha Kingdom of Nepal. The Gorkhas overran the Sikkimese Terai prompting the EIC to start the Anglo-Nepalese War of 1814-16. After the war, treaties between the British and the Gorkhas and Sikkim and British India, drawing the latter closer together. The British objective was to establish a trade route through Sikkim to Tibet, where they believed there existed a significant market for Indian tea and other British goods. At the same time, in the context of The Great Game, increased British influence in the area would deny access to the Russians.

== Provisions ==
Under the treaty, Sikkim was to pay a Rs. 7,000/- indemnity for instigating the British invasion of Sikkim. The amount equaled seven years revenue of the state of Sikkim. The British were permitted to intervene in the internal affairs of the country and under Article 8 all restrictions on travel and trade by British subjects were abolished. Article 13 allowed for construction of a road through Sikkim and rendered all British goods duty-free, except those transhipped through the country to Tibet, Bhutan and Nepal, in which case a maximum 5% customs duty would be payable.

== Aftermath ==
In 1889 John Claude White was appointed British Political Officer in the Sikkim capital Gangtok. White introduced revenue generating agricultural activities and encourage a large number of people to immigrate from different parts of the World. At the same time, he ensured that no other community would be able to purchase lands from the Bhutias and the indigenous Lepchas to protect feudal integrity.

China recognised Sikkim as a British protectorate by the 1890 Convention of Calcutta.

== Bibliography ==
- Mullard, Saul (2011), Opening the Hidden Land: State Formation and the Construction of Sikkimese History, BRILL, ISBN 978-90-04-20895-7
