= Kingdom of Sikkim =

Kingdom in South Asia (1642–1975)

Kingdom of Sikkim See list: འབྲས་ལྗོངས། (Sikkimese); Drenjong; འབྲས་མོ་གཤོངས། (Classical Tibetan); Dremoshong; ᰕᰚᰬᰯ ᰜᰤᰴ (Lepcha); Mayel Lyang
- 1642–1975
- Flag; Top: State flag (1967–1975); Bottom: Royal flag (1877–1975) Coat of arms
- Motto: "Oh, the jewel of creation is in the Lotus"
- Anthem: Drenjong Silé Yang Chhagpa Chilo "Why is Sikkim Blooming So Fresh and Beautiful?"
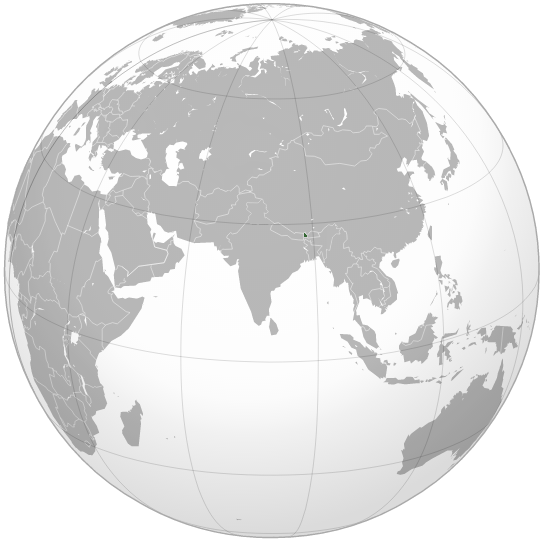
- Location of the Kingdom of Sikkim
- Status: See list: Protectorate of Tibet of Qing China (until 1890); Bhutanese domination (1680/1700–1792); Nepalese domination (1776–1792); Nepalo-Bhutanese presence (1792–1816); East India Company presence (1816–1858); Presence of British Raj (1858–1861); Protectorate of the British Raj (1861–1947) (de facto); Protectorate of India (1950–1975)
- Capital: See list: Yuksom; (1642–1670); Rabdentse; (1670–1793); Tumlong; (1793–1894); Gangtok; (1894–1975)
- Official languages: Chöke, Sikkimese
- Common languages: Lepcha (early period), Dzongkha, Nepali (late period)
- Religion: Tibetan Buddhism; Nepali Hinduism
- Demonyms: Drenjop, Sikkimese
- Government: Absolute monarchy (until 1973) Parliamentary constitutional monarchy (1973–1975)
- Chogyal
  - 1642–1670 (first): Phuntsog Namgyal
  - 1963–1975 (last): Palden Thondup Namgyal
- Prime Minister
  - 1949 (first): Tashi Tshering
  - 1974–1975 (last): Kazi Lhendup Dorjee
- Legislature: State Council of Sikkim
- History
  - Established: 1642
  - Bhutanese 1st Invasion: 1680
  - Bhutanese 2nd Invasion: 1700
  - Nepalese Invasion: 1776
  - Treaty of Titalia signed: 1817
  - Darjeeling given to British India: 1835
  - Palden Thondup Namgyal forced to abdicate: 1975
  - Merger with India: 16 May 1975
- Currency: Rupee
- Today part of: India

The Kingdom of Sikkim (Classical Tibetan and Sikkimese: འབྲས་ལྗོངས།, Drenjong, Dzongkha: སི་ཀིམ་རྒྱལ་ཁབ།, Sikimr Gyalkhab), officially Dremoshong (Classical Tibetan and Sikkimese: འབྲས་མོ་གཤོངས།) was a hereditary monarchy in the Eastern Himalayas which existed from 1642 to 16 May 1975, when it was annexed by India and became the state of Sikkim. It was ruled by Chogyals, or monarchs, of the Namgyal dynasty.

At the time of its annexation into India, Sikkhim was about 7,096 km² (2,740 sq mi), and bordered Nepal to the west, Bhutan to the east, Tibet to the north, and India (West Bengal) to the south.

== History ==
=== Foundation of the monarchy ===
According to legend, Khye Bumsa, a 14th-century prince from the Minyak House in Kham in eastern Tibet, received a divine revelation instructing him to travel south to seek his fortunes. A fifth-generation descendant of Khye Bumsa, Phuntsog Namgyal, became the founder of Sikkim's monarchy in 1642, when he was consecrated as the first Chogyal, or priest-king, of Sikkim by the three venerated lamas at Yuksom. Phuntsog Namgyal was succeeded in 1670 by his son, Tensung Namgyal, who moved the capital from Yuksom to Rabdentse (near modern Pelling). By the time of its foundation, Sikkim became a protectorate of Tibet (which at the time was part of The Khoshut Khanate until 1717 when it became part of the Dzungar Khanate and later to The Qing Dynasty in 1720.)

=== Nepalo-Bhutanese domination ===
In the mid-18th century, Sikkim was invaded by both Nepal (the then Gorkha Kingdom) and Bhutan (then ruled by Gyalsey Tenzin Rabgye) and was under both the Gorkha and the Bhutanese rule for more than 40 years. Between 1775 and 1815, almost 180,000 ethnic Nepalis from Eastern and Central Nepal migrated to Sikkim. After the British colonisation of India, however, Sikkim allied itself with the British India in order to fight Nepal, their common enemy at the time. The Nepalese then attacked Sikkim, overrunning most of the region including the Terai. This prompted the British East India Company to attack Nepal in 1814, resulting in the Anglo-Nepalese War. The Sugauli Treaty between Britain and Nepal and the Treaty of Titalia between Sikkim and British India resulted in territorial concessions by Nepal, which ceded Sikkim to British India.

=== British and Indian protectorate ===
Under the 1861 Treaty of Tumlong, Sikkim became a British protectorate.

Thutob Namgyal, the 9th Chogyal of Sikkim, looked to the Dalai Lama for spiritual leadership and during his reign the Tibetan government started to regain political influence over Sikkim. In 1888 the British sent a military expedition to expel Tibetan forces from Sikkim.

Sikkim became an Indian protectorate in 1950.

=== Accession to India ===
In 1975, allegations of discrimination against Nepali Hindus in Sikkim led to resentment against the Chogyal. According to some accounts, these developments contributed to the movement of Indian Army personnel into Gangtok. According to journalist Sunanda K. Datta-Ray of The Statesman, in April 1975 the Indian Army carried out a surprise operation during which the palace was surrounded and palace guards were killed.

Following the disarming of the palace, a referendum on the monarchy was held, which some sources describe as having taken place under questionable circumstances. Official results indicated that an overwhelming majority voted to abolish the monarchy. Subsequently, the newly formed parliament of Sikkim, led by Kazi Lhendup Dorjee, passed a resolution requesting that Sikkim become an Indian state, which was accepted by the Government of India under Prime Minister Indira Gandhi.

=== International reactions ===
The Government of the People's Republic of China and the Government of the Republic of China in Taiwan both consistently depicted Sikkim as a sovereign state on their official maps since Indian independence and did not stop the practice in 1975. China condemned India's annexation of Sikkim in September 1974 and continued to consider Sikkim a de jure independent state and the annexation illegal as of 2003.

1956 PRC map by SinoMaps Press

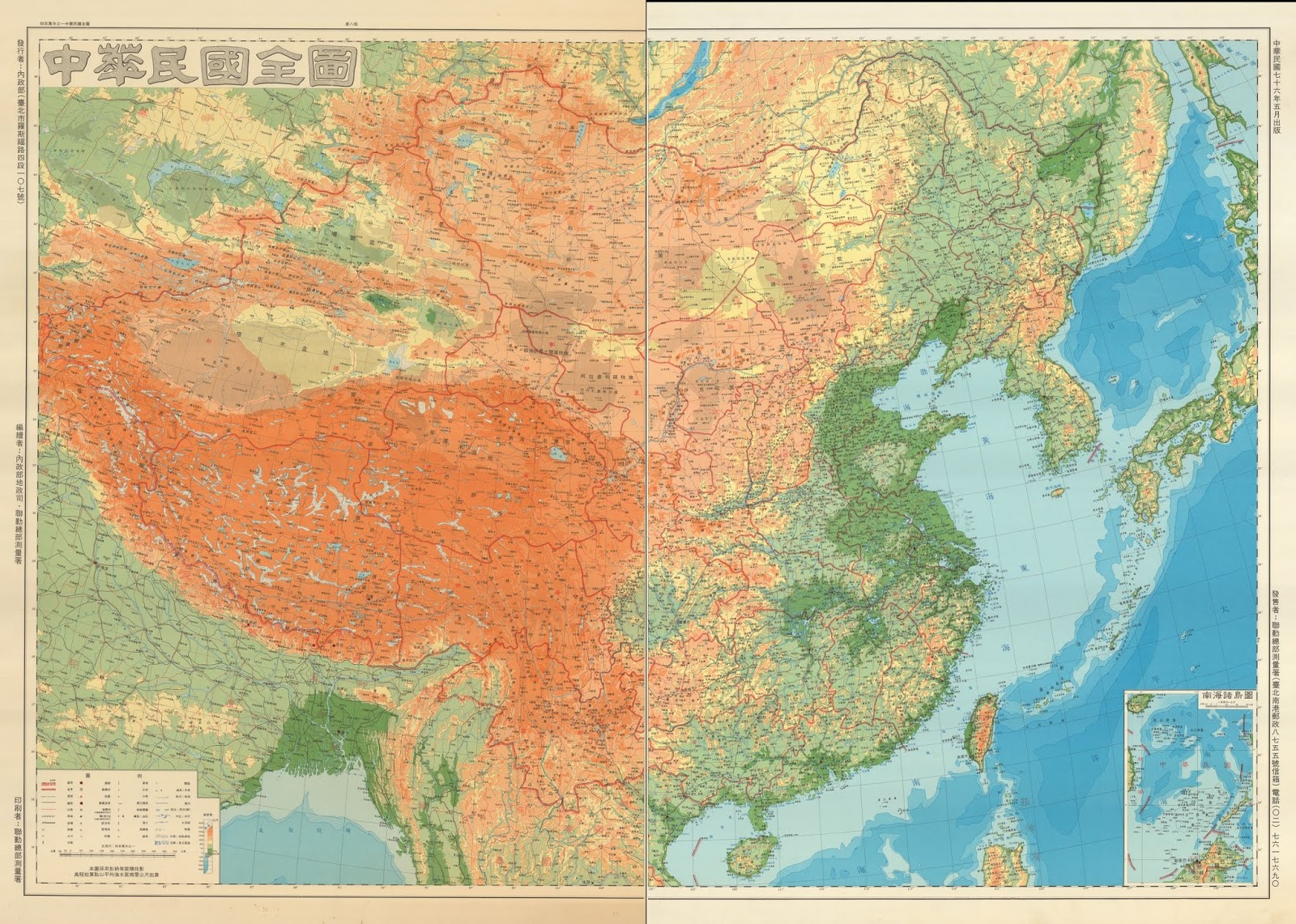
1987 ROC map by the Dept of Land Administration and the Combined Service Forces

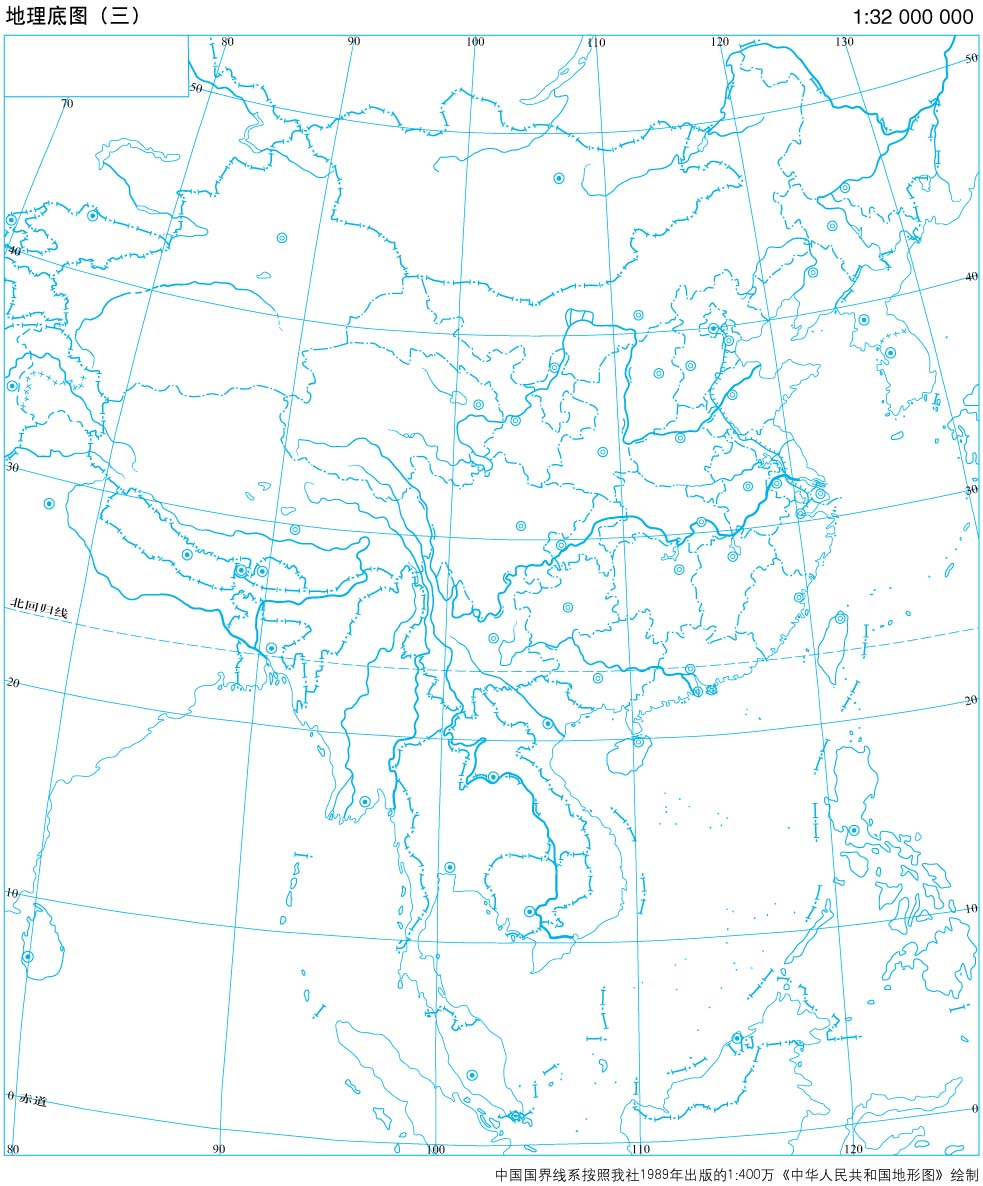
Official PRC basemap around 2000

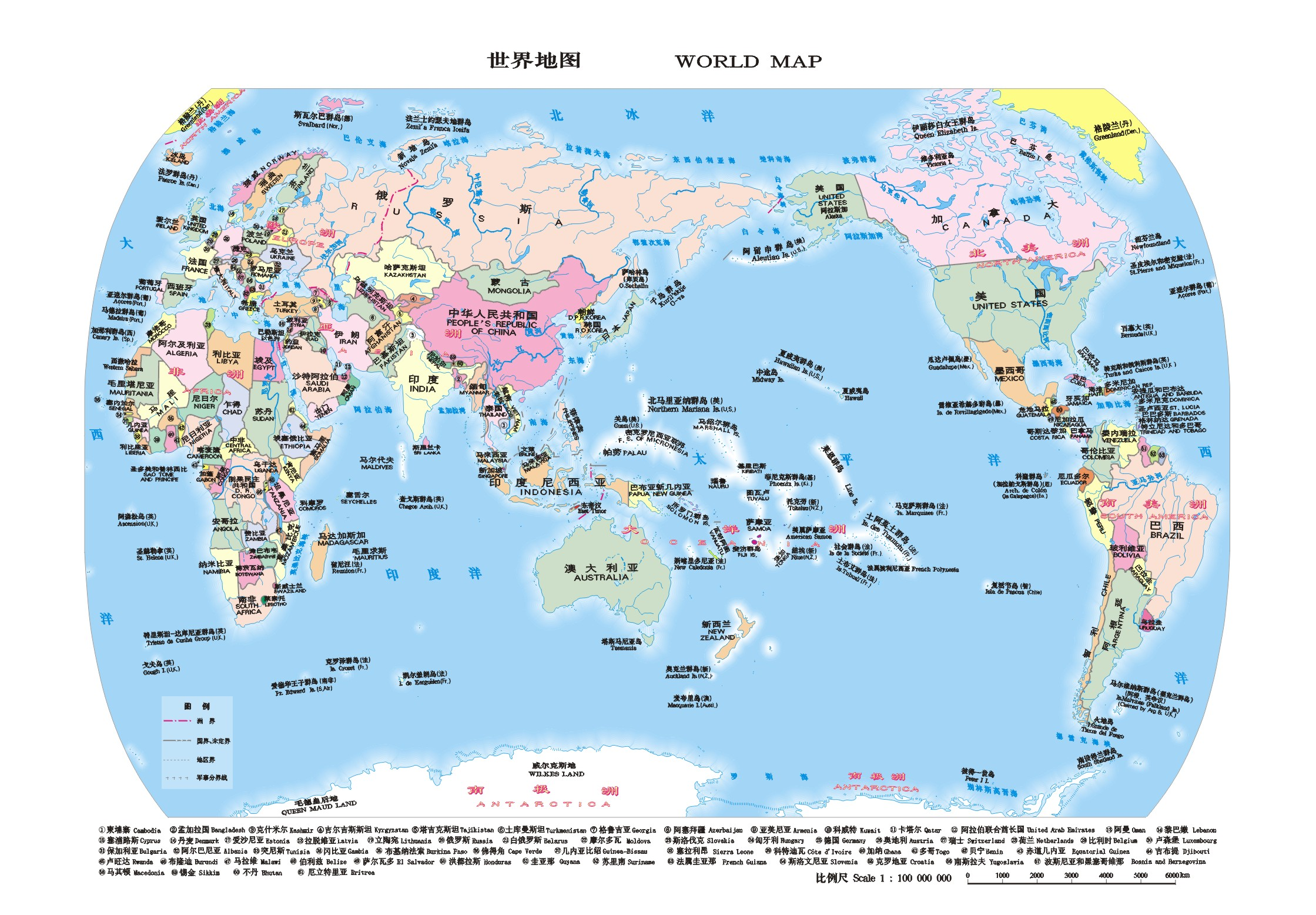
2002 world map by State Bureau of Surveying and Mapping

China gave de facto recognition of Indian sovereignty over Sikkim with the Sino-Indian Memorandum in June 2003 in return for India reiterating Chinese sovereignty over Tibet and stopped publishing maps showing an independent Sikkim or listing it as a bordering country in 2005. Taiwan also eventually started using depictions of actual territorial controls by India.

== Culture and religion ==
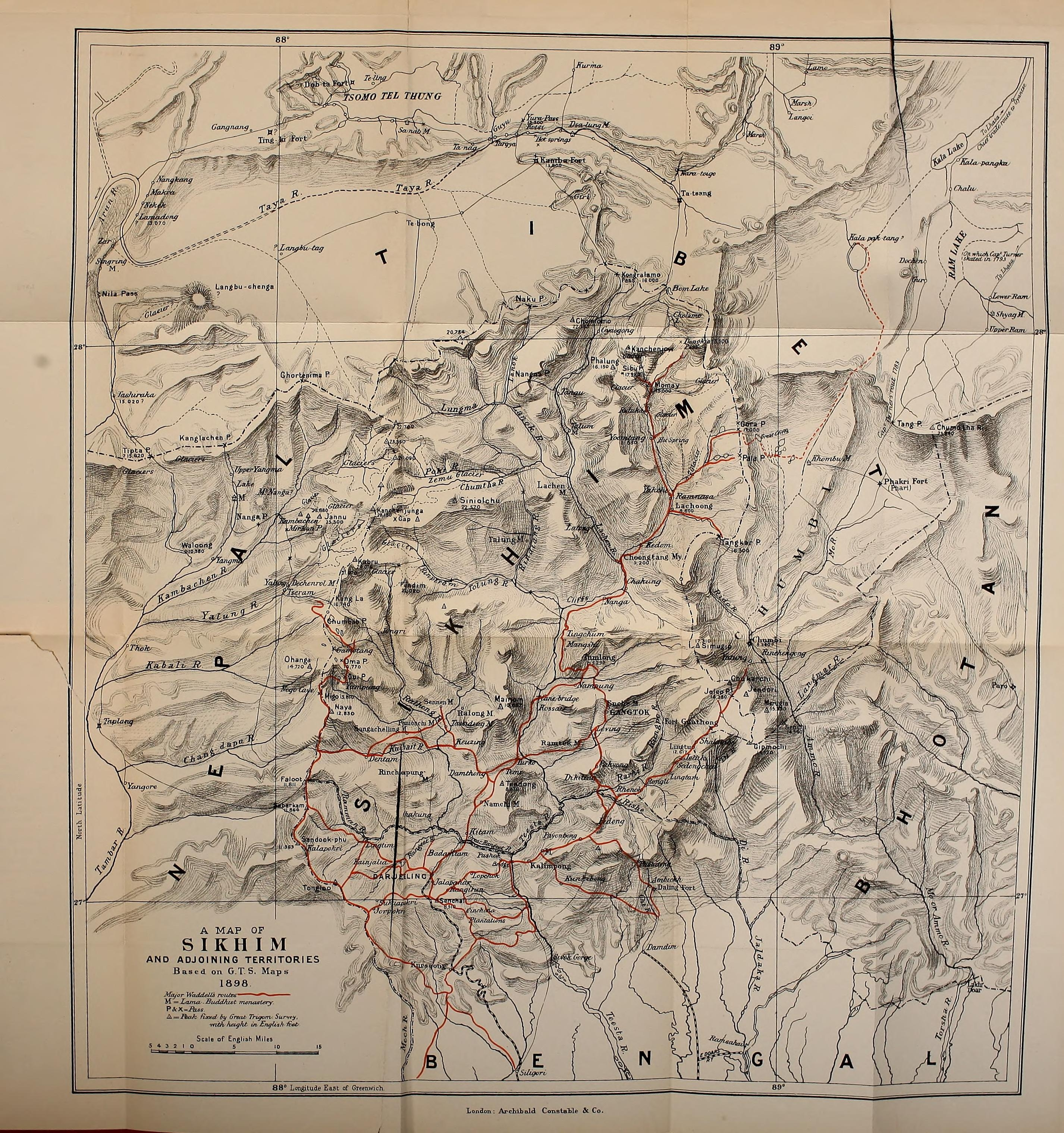
Administrative divisions of Sikkim in 1898

In culture and religion, Sikkim was linked closely with Tibet, from which its first king migrated, and Bhutan, with which it shares borders. The presence of a large ethnic Nepali population, mainly from eastern and central Nepal, also leads to cultural linkages with Nepal.

== See also ==
- Sikkim
- History of Sikkim
- Bhutan
- Chogyal
- List of heads of government of the Kingdom of Sikkim
- List of political officers in the Kingdom of Sikkim

== Sources ==
- Mullard, Saul (2011). Opening the Hidden Land: State Formation and the Construction of Sikkimese History. Brill. ISBN 978-90-04-20895-7.
- Hiltz, Jackie (2003). "Constructing Sikkimese National Identity in the 1960s and 1970s" (PDF). Bulletin of Tibetology. Archived (PDF) from the original on 1 August 2017.
