= Thutob Namgyal =

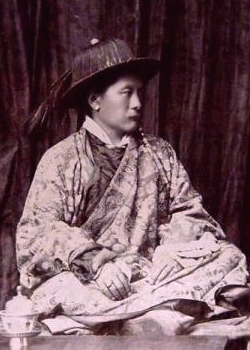
- Photograph of Thutob Namgyal

Chogyal of Sikkim
- Reign: 1874 – 11 February 1914
- Predecessor: Sidkeong Namgyal
- Successor: Sidkeong Tulku Namgyal
- Born: 1860
- Died: 11 February 1914 (aged 53–54)
- Spouse: Yeshay Dolma
- Issue: Tsodrak Namgyal; Sidkeong Tulku Namgyal; Tashi Namgyal; Mayeum Choying Wangmo Dorji
- House: Namgyal dynasty
- Father: Tsugphud Namgyal
- Mother: Maharani Menchi
- Religion: Tibetan Buddhism
- Military career
- Allegiance: Kingdom of Sikkim
- Service years: 1874 - 1914

Thutob Namgyal (Sikkimese: མཐུ་སྟོབས་རྣམ་རྒྱལ་; Wylie: mthu-stobs rnam-rgyal) (1860 – 11 February 1914) was the ruling chogyal (monarch) of Sikkim between 1874 and 1914. Thutob ascended to the throne succeeding his half-brother Sidkeong Namgyal who died issueless. Differences between the Nepalese settlers and the indigenous population during his reign led to the direct intervention of the British, who were the de facto rulers of the Himalayan nation. The British ruled in favour of the Nepalese much to the discontent of the Chogyal, who then retreated to the Chumbi Valley and allied himself with the Tibetans.

The British sent a military force (Sikkim expedition), and after a series of skirmishes between the Tibetans and the British near Jelep La, the Tibetans were pushed back and the Chogyal was put under the supervision of John Claude White, who had been appointed Political Officer in 1889. In 1894, he shifted the capital from Tumlong to the present location, Gangtok. He was knighted in 1911. Alex McKay states, "The 9th Chogyal of Sikkim, Sir Thutob Namgyal, was increasingly supportive of modernisation. After his death in 1914, Sidkeong Tulku Namgyal, who had been groomed for the post by the British, succeeded him but died after ruling for just 10 months. Sidkeong Tulku’s younger half-brother, Tashi Namgyal, who had been educated at St Paul’s and Mayo College, then became Chogyal in 1915, and ruled Sikkim until his death in 1963."

The Sir Thutob Namgyal Memorial (STNM) Hospital in Gangtok was built in memory of him in 1917.

== Honours ==
British Empire

- KCIE: Knight Commander of the Order of the Indian Empire, 12 December 1911.
- Empress of India Gold Medal, 1 January 1877.
- Delhi Durbar Medal (1903), 1 January 1903.
- Delhi Durbar Medal (1911), 11 December 1911.

Thutob Namgyal Namgyal Dynasty Born: 1860 Died: 11 February 1914
Regnal titles
Preceded by Sidkeong Namgyal	Chogyal of Sikkim; 1874 – 1914	Succeeded by Sidkeong Tulku Namgyal
