= Tumlong =

- Village
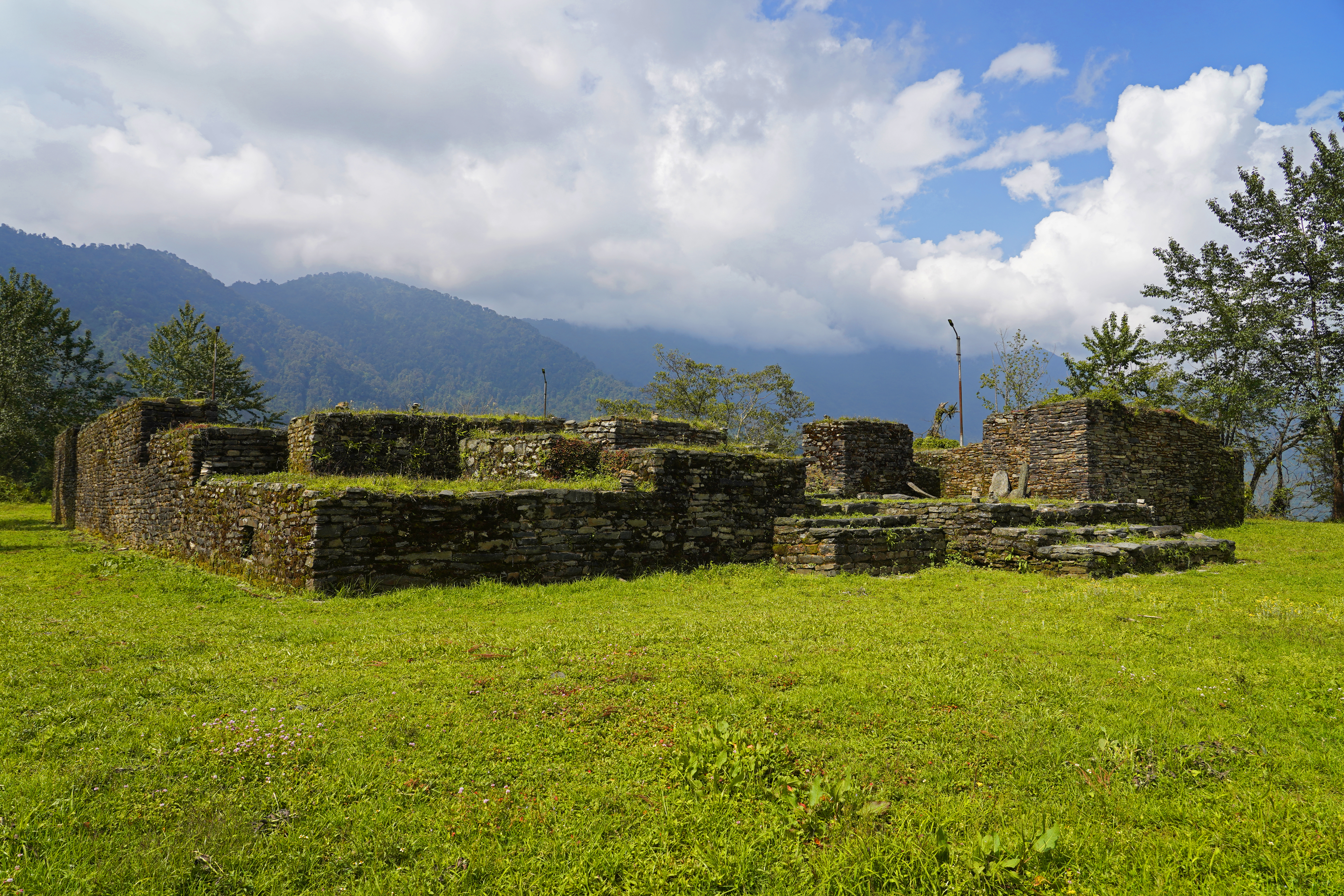
- Tumlong Palace

- Location in Sikkim, India Tumlong (India)
- Coordinates: 27.42°N 88.58°E
- Country: India
- State: Sikkim
- District: North Sikkim
- Elevation: 1,473 m (4,833 ft)

Population (2011)
  - Total: 425

Languages
  - Official: Nepali, Bhutia, Lepcha, Limbu, Newari, Rai, Gurung, Mangar, Sherpa, Tamang and Sunwar
- Time zone: UTC+5:30 (IST)
- Vehicle registration: SK

Tumlong is a village in the Indian state of Sikkim in northeastern India. It is located in the Mangan sub division of North Sikkim district. it is on the bank of the Dik Chu river, a tributary of the Teesta River.

Tumlong was the capital of the Kingdom of Sikkim between 1793 and 1861. The Sikkim Chogyals had a palace here, and a summer palace in Chumbi in the Lower Chumbi Valley. There was route between the two locations via the Cho La pass. In 1861, the capital was moved to Gangtok in order to be closer to the Darjeeling district, which was under the administration of the British Raj.

== History ==
Tumlong was the third capital after Yuksom and Rabdentse close to Nepal. After repeated raids, the capital was shifted to Tumlong, further inland, in 1793 by Tshudpud Namgyal. The Treaty of Tumlong was signed here in 1861 between the British and the Sikkim Rajah.

In 1894, Thutob Namgyal shifted the capital of Sikkim from Tumlong to the current capital of Gangtok.

== Geography ==
Tumlong is located at 27.42°N 88.58°E. It has an average elevation of 1,473 metres (4,833 feet). Seven Sisters Waterfall is located nearby to this village.

== People ==
Many of the village's men are monks at the Buddhist monastery that rests at the top of the village. The villagers speak Sikkimese, Nepali and Hindi. According to the 2011 census, the village's population is 425. The literacy rate is 78.28% compared to 81.42% for the district.

== Services ==
=== Education ===
Tumlong has an elementary school and is a short walk from a high school.

=== Healthcare ===
In Tumlong (specifically in Phodong under the same gram panchayat) there is a Primary Health Centre (PHC) with two residential doctors and a staff including nurses.

== Historical Photographs ==
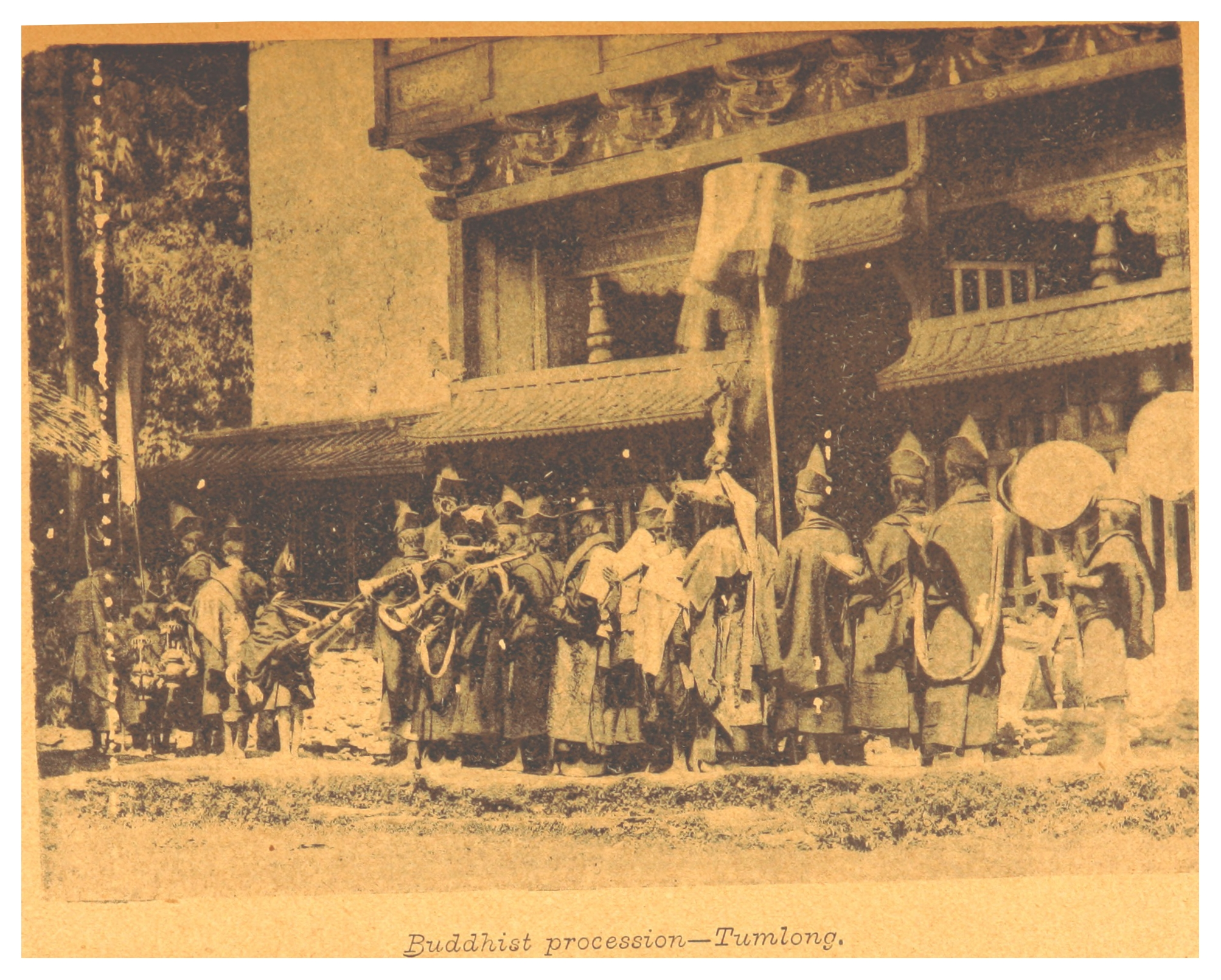
Buddhist Procession

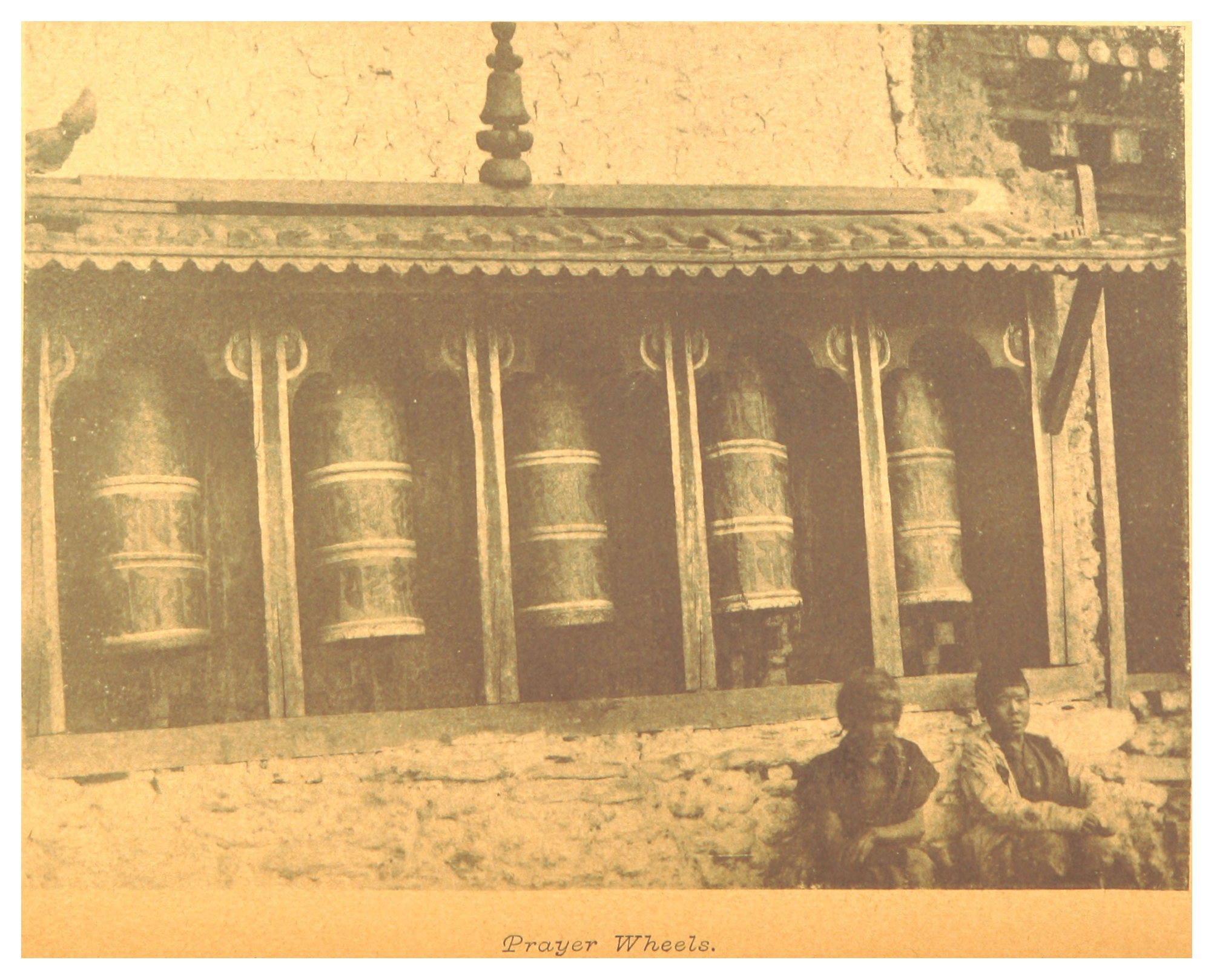
Prayer Wheels

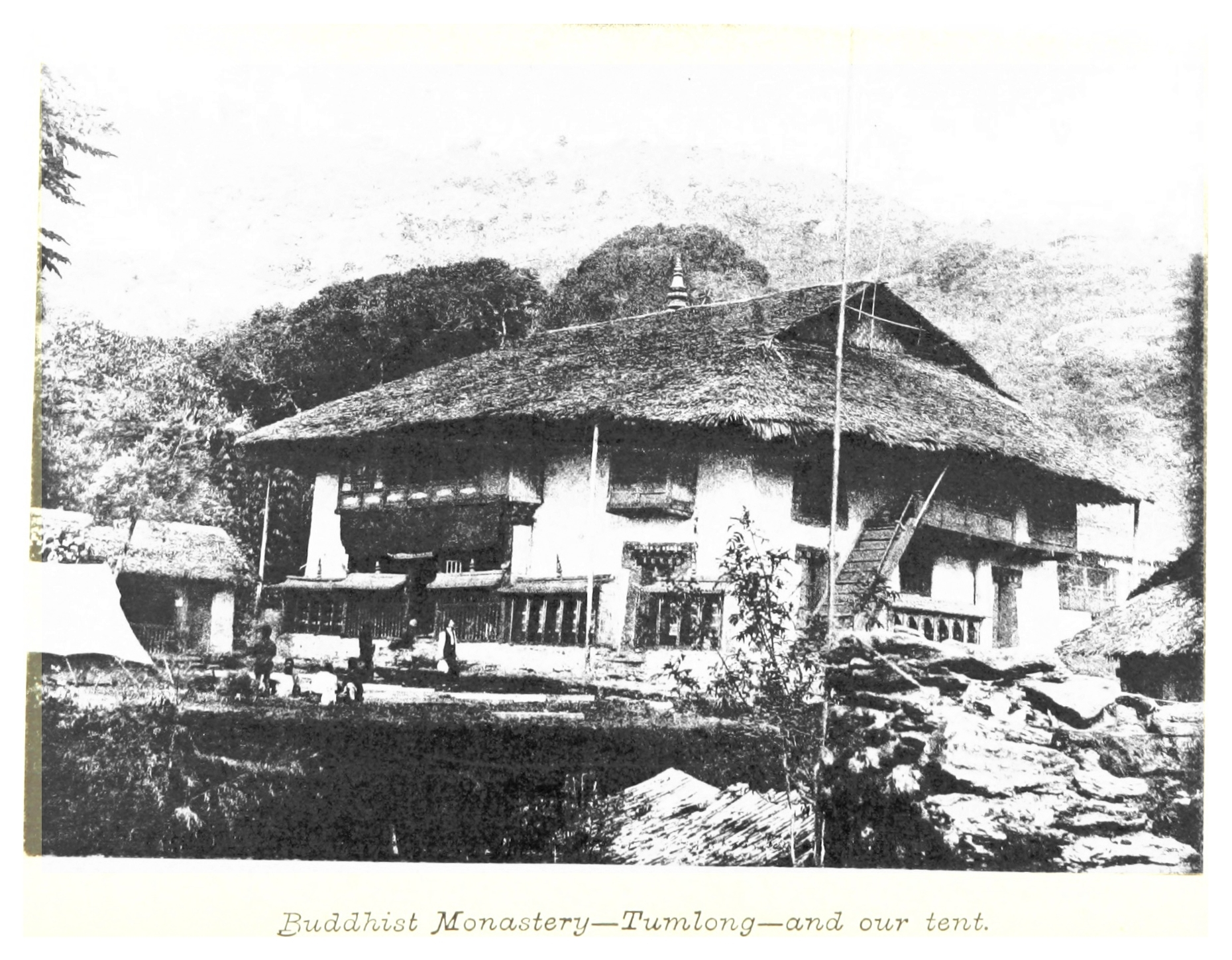
Buddhist Monastery

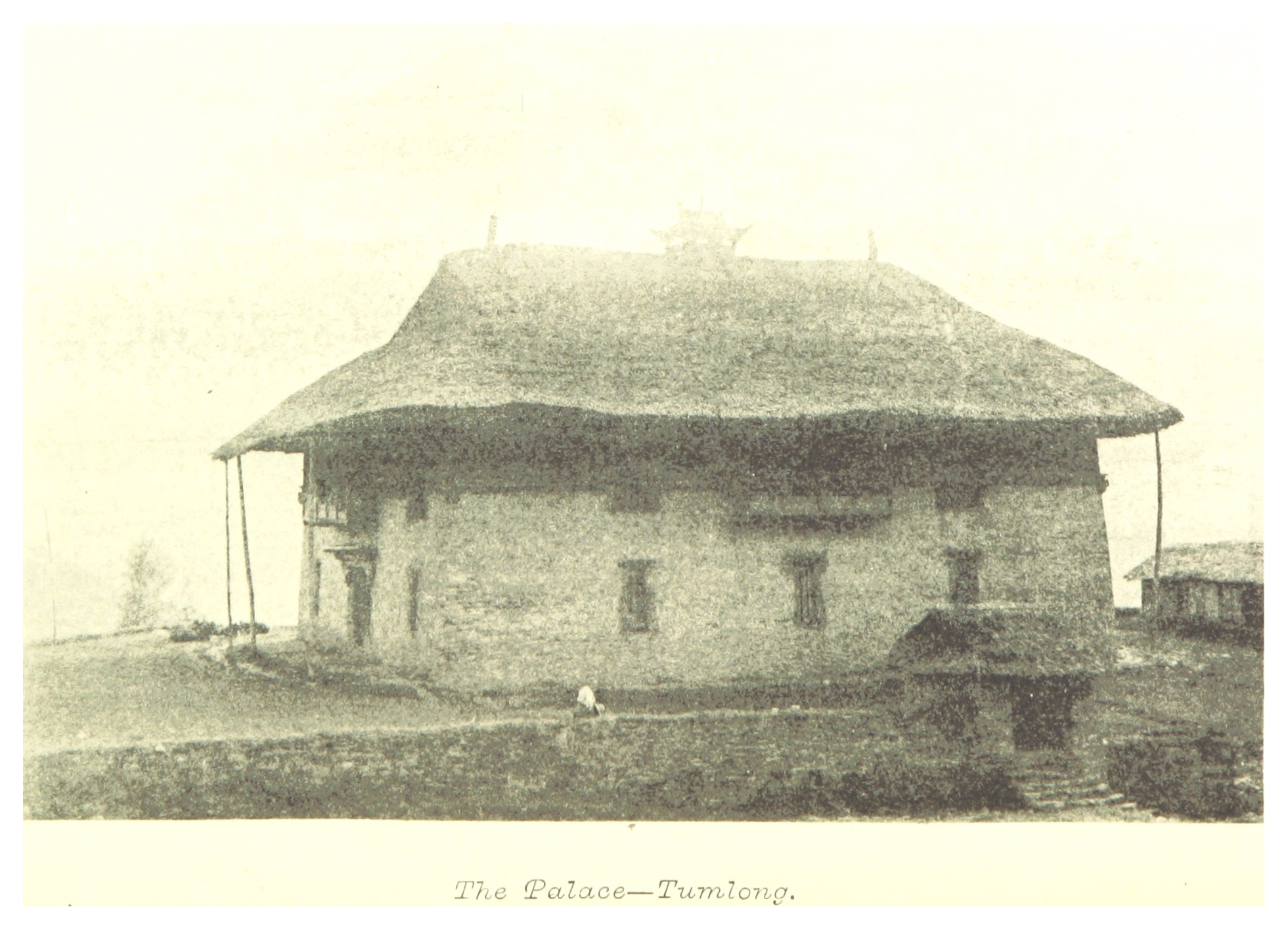
The Palace of Tumlong
