= Phuntsog Namgyal =

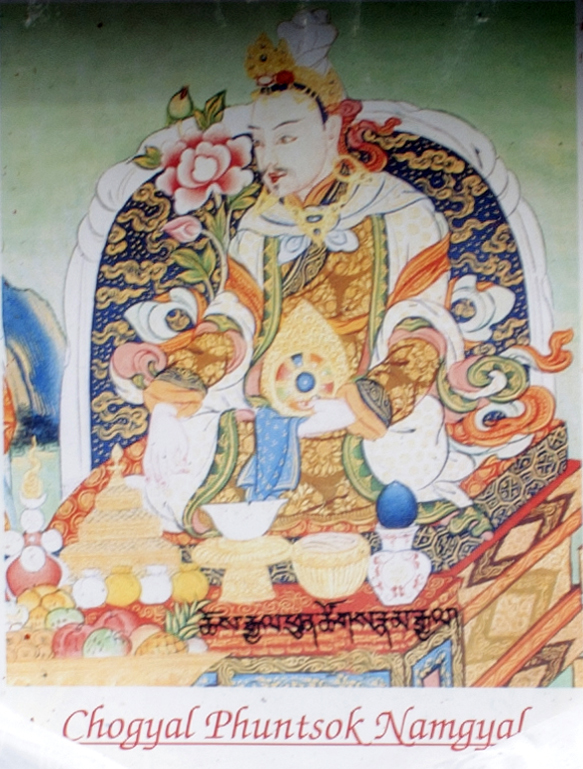
- Phuntsog Namgyal

Chogyal of Sikkim
- Reign: 1642 – 1670
- Successor: Tensung Namgyal
- Born: 1604
- Died: 1670 (aged 65–66)
- Issue: Tensung Namgyal
- House: Namgyal dynasty
- Father: Guru Tenzing
- Religion: Buddhism

Phuntsog Namgyal (Sikkimese: ཕུན་ཚོག་རྣམ་རྒྱལ་; Wylie: phun tshog rnam rgyal) (1604–1670) was the first Chogyal (monarch) of Sikkim, now an Indian state. He was consecrated in 1642 at the age of 38. Phuntsog was a fifth generation descendant of Khye Bumsa, a 13th-century prince from the Mi-nyak House in Kham in Eastern Tibet.

According to legend, Guru Rinpoche, a 9th-century Buddhist saint, had foretold the event that a Phuntsog from the east would be the next Chogyal of Sikkim. In 1642, three lamas, from the north, west, and south went in search for the chosen person. Near present-day Gangtok, they found a man churning milk. He offered them some refreshments and gave them shelter. So impressed were they by his deeds that they realised that he was the chosen one and immediately crowned him king. The crowning took place at Norbughang near Yuksom on a stone slab in a pine covered hill, and he was anointed by sprinkling water from a sacred urn.

Phuntsog, along with the lamas, then converted the local Lepcha people to Buddhism and set about expanding his kingdom up to the Chumbi Valley in Tibet, parts of modern-day Darjeeling in the south, and parts of eastern Nepal.

Phuntsog is credited with creating "Lho-Mon-Tsong-Sum", the idea of unity between Bhutias, Lepchas, and Limbus that forms the core of Sikkimese national identity. In 1663, representatives of the three communities met with the Chogyal to formalize this unity by a written treaty and create a council, the "Lo-Men-Chong", to represent their respective interests on the national level. This same document established autonomy for the Limbu subbas.

Phuntsog moved his capital from Yatung to Yuksom and instituted the first centralised administration. The kingdom was divided into twelve Dzongs, or districts under a Lepcha Dzongpon (governor) who headed a council of twelve ministers. During his reign Buddhism was consolidated as the established religion in Sikkim. He was succeeded by his son, Tensung Namgyal in 1670.

Phuntsog Namgyal Namgyal Dynasty Born: 1604 Died: 1670
Regnal titles
New title new state formed	Chogyal of Sikkim; 1642–1670	Succeeded by Tensung Namgyal
