= Treaty of Titalia =

1817 treaty between Sikkim and the East India Company

- Signed: 10 February 1817; 209 years ago
- Location: Tetulia Upazila, in the Rangpur District of present-day Bangladesh.
- Condition: Returned Sikkimese land annexed by the Nepal.
- Signatories: Captain Barre Latter for EIC and Nazir Chaina Tenjin, Macha Teinbah and Lama Duchim Longadoo for Sikkim.
- Parties: East India Company; Sikkim
- Language: English

The Treaty of Titalia was signed between the chogyal (monarch) of the Kingdom of Sikkim and the British East India Company (EIC). The treaty, which was negotiated by Captain Barre Latter in February 1817, guaranteed security of Sikkim by the British and returned Sikkimese land annexed by the Nepalese over the centuries. It followed the Anglo-Nepalese War, 1814–1816. In return, the British were given trading rights and rights of passage up to the Tibet frontier. The treaty was signed at Titalia, now known as Tetulia Upazila, in the Rangpur District of present-day Bangladesh. In the Gazette of Sikkim, 1894 by H.H. Risley, it was written that "by the Treaty of Titalia, British India has assumed the position of Lord's paramount of Sikkim and a title to exercise a predominant influence in that State has remained undisputed."

== Provisions ==
Signed by Captain Barre Latter as agent for the EIC and three Sikkimese officials, Nazir Chaina Tenjin, Macha Teinbah and Lama Duchim Longadoo, the primary purpose of the treaty under Article 1 was to return land previously seized by the Gorkha Kingdom of Nepal to Sikkim. This land, lying to the east of the Mechi River and the west of the Teesta River had been ceded to the EIC by the Gorkhas under the 1816 Treaty of Sugauli following the Anglo-Nepalese War of 1814–16.

In exchange, the Sikkimese Chogyal agreed to abstain from aggression towards the Gorkhas and to allow the British to mediate any dispute with its neighbours. Further articles pledged military support to the British, that absconders from British justice, whether criminal or civil, would be arrested in Sikkim and finally that all EIC company goods shipped through Sikkim would thereafter be free from duty.

== Effects ==
The treaty effectively transformed Sikkim into a channel for Anglo-Chinese diplomacy.

== See also ==
- History of Sikkim
- List of treaties
