= Sikkimese Bhutia language =

Tibetic language of Nepal and India

Sikkimese
- Drenjongké, Denjongke, Lhoke, Sikkimese Bhutia, Bhutia
- འབྲས་ལྗོངས་སྐད་ bras ljongs skad
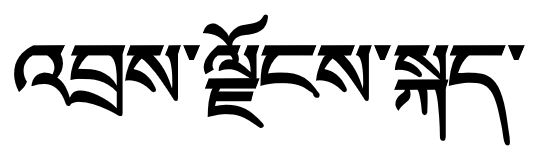
- Region: India Sikkim, Nepal (Koshi Province), and Bhutan
- Ethnicity: Bhutia
- Native speakers: 25,000 (2019)
- Language family: Sino-Tibetan: Tibeto-Burman; Tibeto-Kanauri (?); Bodish; Tibetic; Dzongkha–Lhokä; Sikkimese
- Writing system: Tibetan script

Official status
- Official language in: India: Sikkim

Language codes
- ISO 639-3: sip
- Glottolog: sikk1242

The Sikkimese Bhutia language (Tibetan: འབྲས་ལྗོངས་སྐད་, Wylie: 'bras ljongs skad, THL: dren jong ké, Tibetan pronunciation: [ɖɛ̀n dʑòŋ ké]; 'rice valley language'), or Denjongke, is a Sino-Tibetan language spoken by the Bhutia people of the Indian state of Sikkim and parts of Koshi province in eastern Nepal, and Bhutan. It is one of the official languages of Sikkim.

The Bhutia refer to their own language as Drendzongké (also spelled Drenjongké, Denjongke, Dranjoke, Denjongka, Denzongpeke or Denzongke) and their homeland as Drendzong (Tibetan: འབྲས་ལྗོངས་, Wylie: 'bras-ljongs, 'Rice Valley'). Up until 1975, Sikkimese was not a written language. After gaining Indian statehood, the language was introduced as a school subject in Sikkim and the written language was developed.

== Script ==
Sikkimese is written using Tibetan script and Zhang Yeshe De Script, which it inherited from Classical Tibetan. Sikkimese phonology and lexicon differ markedly from Classical Tibetan, however. SIL International thus describes the Sikkimese writing system as "Bodhi style". According to SIL, 68% of Bhutia were literate in the Tibetan script in 2001.

== History of written form ==
Sikkimese belongs to the Sino-Tibetan language family, and more specifically, is classified as a Tibetic language, descending from Old Tibetan. For most of the language's existence Sikkimese was an oral language, and it was not until 1975 when Sikkim became a part of India that a written language was developed. Until this point, Classical Tibetan was the primary mode for writing. After Indian statehood, Sikkimese was one of the many minority languages in the region to be taught in schools over the next few years. As a result of this, a written language was developed, adopting a modified version of the Tibetan script. The first literary materials were school books translated from Tibetan, and in the following years original works would be authored, including novels, poetry, and plays. While the total number of bhutia authors number approximately 30, the language continues to be used in different media. As of 2021, currently one active newspaper exists, with another paper that has plans to begin printing again. Moreover, in the last 2 decades multiple dictionaries have been published. Finally, the "Bhutia Language Website Development Committee" plans to launch an informational website about the language and peoples in the future.

== Sikkim and its neighbours ==
Speakers of Sikkimese can understand some Dzongkha, with a lexical similarity of 65% between the two languages. By comparison, Standard Tibetan, however, is only 42% lexically similar. Sikkimese has also been influenced to some degree by the neighbouring Yolmowa and Tamang languages.

Due to more than a century of close contact with speakers of Nepali and Tibetan proper, many Sikkimese speakers also use these languages in daily life.

== Dialects ==
Dialects are for the most part quite mutually intelligible in Sikkimese as most differences that exist are minor. One big difference, however, is the lack of honorifics in some Northern villages, discussed in more detail in a separate section below. Also occurring in these villages are the largest dialectal differences in pronunciation and vocabulary. In the area of Bhutan closest to Sikkim, Sikkimese speakers can understand Northern varieties of Sikkimese much more easily than they can varieties from West Sikkim. It is a local belief that the people in these Northern villages originated from this same area in Bhutan.

== Phonology ==
=== Phonology introduction ===
Sikkimese a total of eight vowels and 43 consonants in its inventory. Words in Sikkimese can be split into high or low register based on voice quality and pitch. The register of Sikkimese words can often be predicted based on their starting phoneme, but not always, such as if a word begins with a vowel or voiced nasal. Due to the unpredictability of some of the registers and the fact that phonetic differentiation of registers is achieved largely through pitch, Sikkimese can be considered a tone language. However, tone does not play as large a functional role in the language as in other well-known tone languages.

=== Consonants ===
All consonants happen word-initially with the exception of the glottal /ʔ/. Voiceless nasals and liquids actually don't occur at all. Aspiration is reduced when it comes to the word-medial position and the breathy series of consonants.

Below is a chart of Sikkimese consonants, largely following Yliniemi (2005) and van Driem (1992).

		Labial	Dental/ Alveolar	Retroflex	(Alveolo-) Palatal	Velar	Glottal
Nasal	voiceless		n̥ ⟨ན n⟩			ŋ̊ ⟨ང ng⟩	
Nasal	voiced	m ⟨མ m⟩	n ⟨ན n⟩		n~ɲ ⟨ཉ ny⟩	ŋ ⟨ང ng⟩	
Plosive	voiceless unaspirated	p ⟨པ p⟩	t ⟨ཏ t⟩	ʈ ⟨ཏྲ tr⟩		k ⟨ཀ k⟩	ʔ ⟨འ ʔ⟩
Plosive	voiceless aspirated	pʰ ⟨ཕ ph⟩	tʰ ⟨ཐ th⟩	ʈʰ ⟨ཐྲ thr⟩		kʰ ⟨ཁ kh⟩	
Plosive	voiced	b ⟨བ b⟩	d ⟨ད d⟩	ɖ ⟨དྲ dr⟩		ɡ ⟨ག g⟩	
Plosive	devoiced	p̀ʱ~b̀ɦ ⟨བ p'⟩	t̀ʱ~d̀ɦ ⟨ད t'⟩	ʈ̀ʱ~ɖ̀ɦ ⟨དྲ tr'⟩		k̀ʱ~g̀ɦ ⟨ག k'⟩	
Affricate	voiceless unaspirated		ts ⟨ཙ ts⟩		tɕ ⟨ཅ c⟩		
Affricate	voiceless aspirated		tsʰ ⟨ཚ tsh⟩		tɕʰ ⟨ཆ ch⟩		
Affricate	voiced		dz ⟨ཛ dz⟩		dʑ ⟨ཇ j⟩		
Affricate	devoiced				tɕ̀ʱ~dʑ̀ɦ ⟨ཇ c'⟩		
Fricative	voiceless		s ⟨ས s⟩		ɕ ⟨ཤ sh⟩		h ⟨ཧ h⟩
Fricative	voiced		z ⟨ཟ z⟩		ʑ ⟨ཞ zh⟩		
Liquid	voiceless		l̥ ⟨ལ l⟩	r̥ ⟨ར r⟩			
Liquid	voiced		l ⟨ལ l⟩	r~ɹ~ɾ ⟨ར r⟩			
Approximant		w ⟨ཝ w⟩			j ⟨ཡ y⟩	w ⟨ཝ w⟩	

Devoiced consonants are pronounced with a slight breathy voice, aspiration, and low pitch. They are remnants of voiced consonants in Classical Tibetan that became devoiced. Likewise, the historical Tibetan phoneme /ny/ is realised as an allophone of /n/ and /ng/, which themselves have mostly lost contrast among speakers.

==== Plosives and affricates ====
Plosives and affricates contrast in four distinct ways and it only occurs in the word-initial position. The four contrast ways are voiceless unaspirated, voiced, voiceless heavily aspirated, and voiceless lightly with a breathy voice and aspirated inconsistently. Anything that falls in the word-medial position has a three-way contrast, which are voiced, voiceless aspirated, and voiceless unaspirated. However, aspiration when it comes to the word-medial position is dwindled down as well as dialectal variation. Just the voiceless unaspirated contrast of /p/, /k/ and /ʔ/ can happen in the word-final position and these are mostly produced as an unreleased [p̚] and velar alternating with the glottal stop [k]~[ʔ]. The glottal stop, also being an allophone of word-final /k/, contrasts with non-glottal endings. One interesting phonetic feature is that voiced stops fricatives word-medially. Something else that is interesting is that when these are pronounced in isolation, voiced stops are either prevoiced or pre-nasalized. Some prenasalized onsets are voiced pretty much throughout but there are some that have a brief moment of weak voicing followed by a voiceless release.

==== Bilabial plosives ====
There is only one known geminate, which refers to consisting of similar adjacent sounds especially in consonants, and that is /bb/. This happens when the equative bɛʔ and the infinitive marker -po/bo combines to become -bbɛʔ. The rest of bilabial plosives are as follows: voiced labio-velar approximant, voiceless aspirated bilabial plosive, voiceless unaspirated bilabial plosive, voiceless unreleased bilabial plosive, voiced bilabial fricative, voiceless bilabial fricative, voiced bilabial plosive, and voiceless lightly but not consistent aspirated bilabial plosive followed by breathiness.

==== Dento-alveolar plosives and affricates ====
Dento-Alveolar plosives and affricates are produced with the tongue touching the alveolar ridge and the back of the upper teeth. The following are classified as dento-alveolar: voiceless dental fricative, voiceless unaspirated dento-alveolar laminal plosive, voiced dento-alveolar laminal plosive, voiceless aspirated dento-alveolar laminal plosive, and voiceless lightly not consistent aspirated dento-alveolar plosive followed by breathiness. All can be found in the word-initial position.

==== Postalveolar plosives ====
The following are also known as "retroflex" even though the tongue is not curled backwards as strongly. They are as follows: voiceless unaspirated postalveolar apical plosive, voiceless aspirated postalveolar apical plosive, voiced postalveolar apical plosive, voiced alveolar flap, and voiceless lightly but not consistent aspirated postalveolar apical plosive followed by breathiness.

==== Glottal stop ====
The glottal stop differs from glottal vowel endings and the final /k/ [k̚]~[ʔ] because the glottal stop is only phonemic in the word-final position. It also differs in the high and low register because it only happens in the high register and it is considered a phonetic feature of initial vowels. Yet, although the glottal stop is considered phonemic in the word-final position, it still is not really under that status clearly. That is because the production of final glottals in continuous speech crosses over with vowel length. Vowel length happens as a separate occurrence from glottal stops. Words that end in a glottal stop vary in production length. In continuous speech however, they are mostly produced with a long vowel with no glottal stop. The glottal stop also increases vowel quality within back vowels, much like vowel length. A phonetic glottal stop can also happen when it accompanies an utterance-final nasalized vowel.

==== Fricatives and central approximants ====
There are a total of five fricatives in bhutia, which are /s, z, ɕ, ʑ, h/. The /j/ is the only central approximant. This central approximant /j/ happen in the high and low registers along with the voiceless fricatives /s, ɕ/ which provide evidence that Denjongke has tonal contrasts. /h/ in the high register contrasts with initial vowels and those have intrinsic phonetic initials, otherwise known as glottal initials. However, low register initial vowels just have an intrinsic initial which do not contrast with other glottal initials.

===== Nasals =====
In total, there are eight nasals in Denjongke: /m/, /n/, /ɲ/, /ŋ/, /m̥/, /n̥/, /ɲ̥/, and /ŋ̊/. The first four are voiced and the last four are voiceless. Quite a few Denjongke speakers produce voiceless nasals in a similar way they produce voiced nasals that fall in the high register. Voiceless nasals occur only word-initially, whereas voiced nasals occur word-initially, medially, and finally.

====== Liquids ======
There are two lateral approximants in Denjongke, one is the voiceless /l̥/ and the other is the voiced /l/. In regular conversation, the final /l/ is produced as a vowel lengthening and fronting and also only happens in reading and spelling-style pronunciation. All the laterals are word-medially voiced.

==== Sentence structure and syllable structure ====
Denjongke's syllable structure follow's CV(V/C) or (C) (G) V (C/V) where C stands for consonant, V stands for vowel, and G stands for glide. Denjongke is a verb-final language, and their sentence structure follows SOV or subject-verb-object order, similar to languages such as Japanese and Korean. Although the glide is /j/ most of the time, it can sometimes be an /r/ pronounced as [r], which is called a marginal glide. Not all varieties of Bhutia have this feature. Glides might follow bilabial and velar stops as well as the bilabial nasal /m/. There is also a mandatory vowel that can be preceded by plenty of consonant phonemes and any vowel can fill that position in as long or short vowels. The vowels /i/ and /u/ are the ones that typically go in the second vowel position. The last consonant position can be a plosive, a rhotic, or a nasal.

Open Syllables	V VV CV CVV CGV CGVV
Closed Syllables	VC CVC CGVC

==== Register, pitch, and tone ====
High and low are the two registers in the bhutia language. Both have many features. The high register produces a creaky or stiff voice when producing vowels. The high register also produces a high pitch. Voiceless and aspirated consonants happen in the high register. In the low register, a low pitch is produced along with a modal or breathy voice when producing vowels. The low register is also used when producing voiced and breathy consonants.

=== Vowels ===
The following are the Sikkimese vowels, there are 13 of them: ɛː, ɛ, eː, a, aː, o, oː, øː, yː u, uː, i, and iː. For the following explanations, the terms "short" and "long" refer to the vowel lengthening. In the front-short position are i and ɛ. In the front-long position are iː, yː, øː, ɛː, and eː. The only vowel in the middle-short position is a and the only one in the middle-long position is aː. The vowels in the back-short position are u and o. The vowels in the back-long positions are uː and oː. Due to the complexity of Sikkimese, it has been deemed difficult to analyze vowels on a much deeper level since there are different varieties of Sikkimese spoken in Northern and Eastern Sikkim. One of those varieties is the pronunciation of /a/ and /o/ being neutralized before the phoneme /ŋ/. Another variation is that the short /i/ vowel is usually pronounced as [ɪ] on a lower register rather than the long vowel /iː/ [iː] which is already quite low. One final variation is that although /ɛ/ and /ɛː/ are listed as short and long vowels respectively, they still fall under the same F1 hertz category, which is the frequency that is produced when saying these vowels.

Below is a chart of Sikkimese vowels, also largely following Yliniemi (2005).

	Front		Middle	Back
	unrounded	rounded	unrounded	rounded
Close	/i/ ⟨ི i⟩	/y/ ⟨ུ u⟩		/u/ ⟨ུ u⟩
Mid	/e/ ⟨ེ e⟩	/ø/ ⟨ོ o⟩		/o/ ⟨ོ o⟩
Open	[ɛ] ⟨ེ e⟩		/ɐ/ ⟨a⟩	

- [ɛ] is an allophone of [e], confined to appearing after [dʑ] /j/ in closed syllables

In the Tibetan script, an abugida, the inherent vowel /a/ is unmarked.

== Language vocabulary ==
=== Names ===
First names are typically two disyllabic words, and are heavily influenced by the day of the week (a child was born), planetary words, and Buddhism. Names can also belong exclusively to one gender, or be gender-neutral. In official documents last names are used and vary in origin. Some may use clan names, while others use names that exist for a group of people or region, such as "Denjongpa/Denjongpo", meaning "Rice valley Dwellers" in Tibetan languages. There are also a small number of villages who use last names derived from their respective village name.

=== Colors ===
There are only five basic words for colors in bhutia, with words for red, yellow, white, black, and blue/green. The last color listed can be difficult for bhutia speakers in English translation, as the word represents a very large spectrum, encompassing, for example, both tree leaf green and sky blue. While there are words that describe this range more specifically, they are of (Classical) Tibetan origin and do not see regular use.

Other colors, specific shades of colors, and qualities of color like paleness, darkness and brightness are represented by using the basic color terms with word compounding or suffixation.

=== Honorifics ===
There are different forms of many nouns, pronouns, and verbs varying in politeness and respect, and whose use depends on the relationship between the addresser and addressee, and/or how the speaker perceives the addressee. Typically there are two different groupings, with the lower group being considered common and simple, and the latter honorific. For example, there are three levels of the second person pronoun; the low level may be used with social inferiors or friends, the mid level with social equals, and the honorific with social superiors.

There are also a small number of villages that do not generally use honorifics, using the low-level second person pronoun even with strangers. The lack of honorifics is perceived by most speakers as vulgar and offensive, while the use of honorifics is perceived by these villagers as "too slow and wordy". This may be exemplified by the translated sentence "Where are you going?". With honorifics the sentence takes eight syllables, and without, just three. Overall the use of honorifics is associated with one's speaking ability and language skills.

== Differences in spoken and written language ==
While the spoken and written language are similar, there are some minor differences. Notable types of change are phonological reduction/modification, as well as morphosyntactic reduction. Some morphosyntactic changes include the dropping of case-markers in certain contexts. Examples that have been observed include noun modifiers losing the genitive marker, and the dropping of case marking in directionals. Both literary and spoken variants borrow from related or influential languages. The written language most often borrows Tibetan loan words, especially for words or concepts that may otherwise not yet be standardized in Denjongke. Because of this, non-literate speakers may have difficulty with these loan words. Conversely, the spoken language borrows more from neighboring Nepali as well as English. Spoken language is more likely to be code switched with these than in written language.

== Noun phrases and constituents ==
=== Noun phrases ===
Noun phrases are made up of nouns with their proceeding or following modifiers, proforms much like pronouns, demonstrative words, and nominalized clauses. The order in which noun modifiers follow is (demonstrative) + noun + adjective + numeral + (demonstrative). Whenever the quantity of a noun is specified, the noun is not pluralized. It would like something like "sister three" rather than "sisters three". Nouns, adjectives, postposition phrases, noun compliment clauses, and relative clauses can all be considered genitive-marked noun modifiers.

== Word classes ==
=== Nouns ===
Nouns in Denjongke have two forms: a proper form and an ordinary form. The ordinary form is used in common day-to-day speech between friends and family, while the proper form is used in more formal situations. Most Denjongke speakers do not know every form of these nouns, but knowing the formal form shows proficiency in the language. These two forms can be formed by adding a certain suffix or prefix, but others have a completely different spelling. Most nouns have one or two syllables, compound words, though still nouns, may have three or more syllables.

=== Verbs ===
Verbs in Denjongke show a state of being, feeling, or describe the happenings of events. Most verbs carry one syllable to help differentiate themselves from adjectives, and also carry two forms, the proper and ordinary forms.

=== Adjectives ===
Adjectives vary from two to three syllables in order to, as forementioned above, help tell the difference between a verb and an adjective. It is often hard to tell the difference between a verb and an adjective because they both end in "-bo" or "-po".

== See also ==
- Bhutia people
- Lepcha people
- Lepcha language
- Indigenous peoples of Sikkim
- History of Sikkim
