= List of Limbu people =

This is a list of notable Limbu people

== Kings ==
- Buddhi Karna Raya Khebang Limbu- a king of Morang kingdom

== Politics ==
- Bhim Hang Limboo - Indian politician from Sikkim
- Sanchaman Limboo - fourth Chief Minister of Sikkim, India
- Ram Bahadur Limboo - Indian politician from Sikkim
- Ganesh Kumar Limbu - Indian politician from Assam
- Govinda Subba -first governor of Province No. 1 Nepal
- Parshuram Khapung -3rd governor of Province No. 1 Nepal
- Rajendra Prasad Lingden- Nepalese politician
- Bishnu Maden - Politician and leader of Rastrya Prajatantra Party, Former Minister
- Subas Chandra Nemwang -former speaker of House of Representatives lawyer, politician and leader of CPN(UML), Former Chairperson in Constitution Assembly, Nepal
- Sukra Raj Sonyok (Songyokpa) - Chief Whip of Nepali Congress 2003-2005
- Indra Hang Subba - Indian politician
- Moni Kumar Subba, Indian M. P. Lok Sabha for Assam
- Narendra Kumar Subba - Indian politician from Sikkim
- Ram Bahadur Subba - Indian politician from Sikkim
- Shiva Maya Tumbahamphe - former deputy speaker of the House of Representatives. and Minister of Law, Justice and Parliamentary Affairs Nepal.

== Education- historian, poet, professor ==
- Iman Xin Chemjong (1904-1975 AD) - Limbu historian, author, writer on Limbu Kirant at the Tribhuwan University, first Kirat historian.
- Balkrishna Mabuhang - associate professor, writer
- Bairagi Kainla - Poet, former Chancellor of Nepal Academy and researcher into the folklore of the Limbu people.
- Phalgunanda Lingden - prophet of Kirat Satyahang religion
- Desh Subba - author and poet
- Tanka Bahadur Subba, Former Vice Chancellor, Sikkim University.
- Upendra Subba - Poet
- Te-ongsi Sirijunga Xin Thebe (1704-1741 AD) - eighteenth century Limbu martyr and social worker, Yakthung sirijunga script reviver and teacher.

== Music, film and media ==
- Deepak Limbu - Singer, winner of "First Nepali Tara" competition
- Jhuma Limbu, Nepali folk musician and researcher
- Subin Limbu - Miss Nepal 2014
- Tara Prakash Limbu - singer, music composer
- Abhaya Subba - rock singer, songwriter, composer, judge of first season of Voice of Nepal
- Dinesh Subba - composer, singer and lyricist from Darjeeling
- Malvika Subba - Television and media personality, Miss Nepal 2002 and social activist.
- Nabin Subba - Film director
- Srijana Subba - film actress

== Public service, government, army, and police ==
- Captain Rambahadur Limbu - Victoria Cross holder, Her Majesty's Armed Forces, United Kingdom
- Tanka Bahadur Subba - Indian university administrator; vice chancellor of Sikkim University
- Gyan Bahadur Yakthumba- 3rd IGP of Nepal police

== Sports ==
- Kiran Chemjong- Nepali footballer who plays as a goalkeeper and captains the Nepal national football team.
- Padam Limboo - Indian cricketer from Sikkim
- Anil Subba - Indian cricketer from Sikkim
- Bijay Subba - Indian cricketer from Sikkim
- Bhushan Subba - Indian cricketer from Sikkim
