= Limbu clans and tribes =

Social organization of Limbu people

The Limbu nation is made up of hundreds of clans. Each Limbu clans are classified under their Tribe or subnational entity or according to their place of origin. Almost all the Limbu clan names are unique, therefore it is not necessary to specify the Tribe or the place of origin every time the clan name is said.

The most Limbu (Yakthung) tribes are the original inhabitants and descended from the ancient Kirata mentioned in such Hindu epics as the Mahabharata.

Clan names that may not be unique (for example Chongbang or Maden), are divided by listing their tribe name before or after their clan. Chongbang can be Sireng-Chongbang or Hukppa-Chongbang or Chongbang Kyak, similarly Maden clan can be specifically Tilling-Maden or Thokleng-Maden or Tunglung-Maden or Phendua-Maden. Listed Chaobisia, Mawakhola, Tambarkhola, Charkhola, Maiwakhola, Panthar, Tinkhola, Phedap and Yangrok are the names of the places where the respective clans belong to. Chaobisia refers to present day Dhankuta and Morang districts, Tambarkhola area is in present-day Taplejung district, Mewakhola area refers to present day Taplejung and Sankhuwasabha districts, Charkhola is a present-day Ilam and Jhapa districts, Maiwakhola area is in present-day Taplejung district, Tinkhola is in Panchthar district, Panthar is Panchthar district, Phedap is the north-central area of Terhathum district, Athraya is in northeastern Terhathum district, Chethar is in southern Terhathum, Sankhuwasabha and eastern Dhankuta district. Yangrok area is in present-day Southeast Taplejung, Northeast Panchthar districts and west Sikkim. All of these areas make up Limbuwan.

== Clans and marriages ==
To Limbus, genealogy is very important before conducting marriages. Limbus do not marry within their own clan known as incest and not into their mother's clan or their grandmothers' clan. Some Traditional and cultural Limbus with strong background, avoid marriages into clans from which they derive their blood, up to seven generations in their father's line and up to five generations in their mother's line. That means Marriages into great-great-great-grandmothers' clans are also avoided.

The clan names have terms attached to it as well, Libang means the Archer, Tilling means the Police, Menyangbo means the successful one, Samba means the priest, etc. However, clans also have meanings which evolved from sentences e.g. Hembya was according to legend, evolved from "Hey' nangh wa" which translates to "Over there also". However, on original verbal dialect, 'Hembya' would be pronounced as "Hem-phe". This name was previously used to identify Thebe's next clan who settled in a different territory.

The following are the list of Limbu clans.

== List of Limbu clans ==
=== A ===
- Ajibungia
- Ambung
- Angbuhang
- Angbo
- Angbung
- Anchangbo
- Angbang
- Angdembe (also Angdembey)
- Angdemba - Papo
- Angdemba - Phendua
- Angdemba - Nembang
- Angla - Tokleng
- Anglabang
- Anglabang - Khewa
- Angthupo
- Arumhang
- Anchangbong-Anchhangbo not ch chh*

Awajungo/Akwajungo/Awajung

=== B ===
- Bokhim - Yyorong
- Bokhim - Maa
- Bokhim - Lokshom
- Bokhim -khangba
- Banta
- Baphu
- Baragahri - Sangwa
- Baragahri - Khajum
- Begha - Panchthar
- Bengtak
- Bhotangwa
- Burra
- Burumba
- Begha
- Yokpangden-Panchthar

=== C ===
- Changshu
- Chambang kyak
- Charkhele
- Chebegu
- Chelifung
- Chengsui
- Chenwaphu
- Chermali
- Chethare
- Chilikchan
- Chiyeppa (Sanyak)

- Chemjong - Mabo-hang
- Chemjong - Panthar
- Chemjong - Lad-ho
- Chemjong - Chikcho
- Chilikehomba
- Chintung
- Chikcho - Kajum
- Chabeghu
- Chungsu - Ejam
- Chongbang - Kyak
- Chongbang - Huukpa
- Chongbang - Khajum
- Chongbang - Khewa
- Chongbang - Nalbo
- Chongbang - Phago
- Chongbang - Samba
- Chongbang - Sireng
- Chongbang - Tilling
- Chongbang - Tukyuma
- Chongbang - Tunglung

Yokpangden

=== D ===
- Durombo
- Dewan

=== E ===
- Eveng (also known as Aveng)
- Eidhingo
- Ehpheng
- Ejam - Fenjetangling
- Ekten
- Espo
- Emsong(Emehang)

=== F ===
- Fenduwa
- Fatra
- Fedap
- Fyaag

=== G ===
- Gnoyongba

=== H ===
- Hamphia
- Hangemba - Ejam
- Hangemba - Yangrok
- Hangemba - Yungwa
- Hangemba - Mawakhole
- Hanggam - Mawakhole
- Hanggam - Nalbo
- Hanggam - Sering
- Hangbang
- Hangserung
- Hangun
- Hanserumba
- Hembya
- Hellok
- Hinah
- Hingo

=== I ===
- Idingo - Tunglung
- Idingo - Tinkole
- Idingo - Athraya
- Ijam
- Imehang
- Imusong
- Inemba
- Ingnam (Ingnamfe) ईवा, ह्वाकु (हाङ्को) र धनकुटा
- Ingwa - Chethar
- Ingwa - Tambarkhole
- Ingwaba - Nembang
- Ingwaba - Papo
- Ingwarem
- Iringba
- Isbohang
- Iwa (Iwahang) धनकुटा
- Iwaram
- Iwahang

=== J ===
- Jabegu - Thegim
- Jeyoh
- Jimbukang

=== K ===
- Khamdak
- Kadi
- Kambang - Mabohang
- Kambang - Sambahang
- Kanbonan
- Kandangwa
- Kanthak
- Karamba
- Kattawa(Sanyak)
- Kawepung
- Kebok - Tilling
- Kebok - Yongyahang
- Kebok - Khewa
- Kedem (केदेम)
- Keiba - Kebang
- Keiba - Lingden
- Kekluke
- Kerabare
- Kerung - Panchthar पा‌ंचथर
- Kerumba
- Kerung
- Kerungma
- Keyo - Ejam
- Keyung
- Khajum - Parghari
- Khajum - Chongbang
- Khajum - Kurumbang/Kurumbhong/Kurumbhang
- Khajum - Wayang
- Khajum - Le:kwaa
- Khangwa
- Khapung
- Khawahang
- Khewa - Tumbah
- Khewa - Maden
- Khewa - Mangyak
- Khewa - Tigela
- Khewa - Anglabang
- Khewa - Chongbang
- Khimding
- Kobok
- Kochpongo
- Kodang
- Koggeknamba
- Kogling
- Kohyang
- Koklung
- Kondongwa
- Kongliba - Ejam
- Kongwa - Singjango
- Koyahang
- Koyohang
- Kudanamba
- Kugetnamba
- Kulunglong
- Kungari
- Kurumbang

Kyadapa

=== L ===
- Lingkhim - subhasong
- Lingkhim - maharesong
- Lawati
- Labung
- Lad-ho - Chemjong
- Lahbung
- Lahoron
- Lambeba
- Langbeba (Sanyak)
- Laoti(papo)
- Lechharbo
- Lejenji
- Lekhongwalong
- Lekhwa - Kajum
- Lekwa - Kamthak
- Lekwa - Samba
- Lengwa
- Lewahang - Kajum
- Lewahang - Sambahang
- Lianmphe
- Libang
- Limbukhim
- Limkhim
- Lingdam - Immechang
- Lingdem - Charkole
- Lingdem - Tinkole
- Lingdem - Panthare
- Lingden - Khewa
- Lingden - Sering
- Lingden - Yangroke
- Lingden -
- Lingdom
- Lingjemba
- Lingka
- Lingkhim
- Lingthep
- Lohringen
- lakshamba
- laksom
- Lokpeba
- Loksong
- Loktam
- Loktong
- Loli
- Loliba (Sanyak)
- Longwa
- Longwago
- Lua
- Lugumba
- Luhimba
- Lumdhoyu-tambarkhola lingkhim
- Lungfungwa
- Lumphungwa
- Lung Maden
- Lungkimba
- Lunkimba
- Luwa

- Laksam (Laksam/ Laksaam)

Yangwarak Panchthar

=== M ===
- Maharesong - lingkhim
- Maagaingba (Sanyak)
- Mabo
- Maden
- Mademba - Huuppa
- Mademba - Chathare
- Maden - Bakkim
- Maden - Khewa
- Maden - Nalbo
- Maden - Sanba
- Maden - Tilling
- Maden - Tokleng
- Maden - Tukyuma
- Maden - Tunglung
- Maden - Phendua
- Madongya
- Magmu
- Mahbe
- Mahbo - Chemjong
- Mahbo - Tinkole
- Mahbo - Yangrok
- Mahbo - Mahbo
- Mahsuwa
- Madenhang
- Maken
- Makkhim
- Makim
- Maksingbung
- Malahang
- Mangap
- Mangbo
- Mangdemba
- Mangden
- Mangea
- Manglak
- Mangmu
- Mangsrukha
- Mangthumbo
- Mangwayak
- Mangyeh
- Mangyunbgo
- Mangyung
- Manjia
- Mansingbung
- Mapejong
- Mardin
- Marinda
- Maringdom
- Mauba
- Mayang
- Mayongba
- Mayuthak - Ejam
- Mebek
- Meblak
- Mebok
- Mehokpa
- Mekending
- Menyangbo
- Mikluke
- Mingemba
- Miyongma
- Modengba
- Modengsomba
- Modenyak
- Moraba
- Moringlahang
- Moro
- Moyongba
- Muden
- Mudenchain
- Mudensong - Samba
- Musuhang

=== N ===
- Naamyoba (Sanyak)
- Naidemba
- Naika
- Naklebu
- Nalbo
- Nalibe
- Nalutem
- Namdehang
- Namlakpa
- Nangen
- Nayamba
- Neyong/Neyonghang (Sanyak)
- Nembang (also Nemwang)
- Nembang - Phejong
- Nembang - Nanglakpa
- Nembang - Yangdemba
- Nembang - yaksoba
- Nembeke
- Neongoa
- Neonwa
- Neshie
- Ningleku/Ninglekhu
- Nogo - Tambarkhola
- Nogo - Chaobisia
- Nogo - Lingden
- Nogo - Tinkole
- Nugedemma
- Nugo
- Nundehang
- Nu - Kurungbhong

=== O ===
- Ogu
- Okhebu
- Okhrabu
- Ongba
- Onim

Khudang

=== P ===
- Pabemba
- Padupling
- Pahim
- Pahtangna
- Painger
- Pak - Sangwa
- Pak - Serma
- Pak - Pheyak
- Pakpasomba
- Paksangwa
- Pakseng
- Pakserma
- Palahajum
- Palange
- Palghe
- Palungwa
- Pambokpa
- Pangyanggu
- Pangba Phago
- Pangboma
- Pangenhang
- Pangma(Pangmali)
- Pankemyang
- Panphoma
- Pangdhak (spread out from labri, khesera, bokhim, tamrang and saplakhu villages)
- Papalang
- Papo
- Papsong
- Parghari
- Parangden
- Parangen
- Pahango
- Pataha
- Patare
- Patangwa
- Pegwa
- Pekim
- Pemba
- Pembasong
- Penchangwa
- Penjelam
- Penjetamlingba
- Pettehba
- Phaklecha
- Phakole
- Phalechuwa
- Phalechuwa
- Phamphe
- phatra
- Phedap
- Pheguba
- Phegwaden
- Phejonba
- Phejong
- Phembu
- Phemsong
- Phewaden
- Phiyak
- Phombo
- Phonjela
- Phonpho
- Phonthak
- Phonyang
- Phopra
- Photre
- Pitrongba (Sanyak)
- Patangwa
- Phudunghang
- Phuglala
- Phungenahang
- Pichchowa
- Pobemba
- Podalung - Tilling
- Podalung - Tinkhole
- Poinyanggu
- Pomu
- Pongjange
- Pehim
- Potangna - Tumbangphe
- Potangwa - Sambahang
- Pothangehere
- Potro
- Punglai-ing
- Punjemba
- Puradin
- Purumbo
- Purungbo

=== S ===
- Sabenhimba
- Sademba
- Sakwademba
- Sakwaden - Ponglai
- Sakwaden - Tegim
- Sakwaden - Tumbangphe
- Sambahamphe
- Seling
- sambiu (Sembo or Simbu)
- Samdangwa
- Sameakamba
- samra
- Samsomba
- Samsong
- Samsohang
- Sangba
- Sangi
- Sangpanggye
- Sangsangbo
- Sangsangu
- Sangwa
- Sanjung
- Sansoyang
- Sauden
- sanba-tangdapa
- Sanba-mudenchang
- Sanba-maden
- Sanba-lunghimba
- sanba-fayang
- Sademba-siwara
- Sanyakpa (Sanyak)*

 *Tumsa
 *Tumba
 *Thaksuba
 *Nayangba
 *Yungsingba
 *Langbeba
 *Naamyoba
 *Chiyeppa
 *Kattawa
 *Loliba
 *Thalangwa
 *Pitrongba
 *Magaingba  

- sendang
- senehang
- suaba

=== T ===
- Tawa
- Tababung-(Tabebung-sangamba Tabebung-khechhingse)
- Tabelung
- Thoklen
- Takmademba
- Takwaden
- Tamba
- Tembe
- Tambedem
- Tamdem
- Tamling(Samsingbo)
- Tamorangba
- Tangba
- Tangbhopa
- Tangdewa
- Tanjamba
- Tegela
- Tegim
- Tegoba
- Tegothopra
- Tengbung
- Teyung
- Tellok
- Tembeh
- Tengubumthupia
- Tentak
- Terathar
- Thaksuba (Sanyak)
- Thaklang
- Thaklung
- Thalang(chongbang & maden)
- Thalangba (Sanyak)
- Thalung
- Thamsuhang
- Thamden
- Thangden
- Thangamba
- Theguba
- Thebe-Sing
- Thebe-thuppoko
- Thoglema
- Thoklen
- Thokpeba
- Thoksuba - Khewa
- Thopra
- Tumba (Sanyak)
- Thumsa (Sanyak)
- Thumyangba
- Thupukum
- Tigalla
- Tikapatti
- Tinglabe
- Tinkote
- Todopa
- Togleng
- Toklehang
- Toklengkya
- Tokphela
- Tokponden
- Tole
- Topetlagu
- Tubuk
- Tukimo
- Tukohang

Tumba (Sanyak)

- Tum - Papo
- Tum - Pheyak
- Tum - Sangwa
- Tum - Serma
- Tum - Kurumbang
- Tumbah - Khewa
- Tumbahang
- Tumbang
- Tumbahangphe - Phedapea
- Tumbahangphe - Tokleng
- Tumbahangphe - Phendua
- Tumbapo - papo
- Tumbrok - Papo
- Tumbrok - Phago
- Tumrok - Tokleng
- Tumruk - Panthare
- Tumsa (Saynak)
- Tumsangwa
- Tumsengwate
- Tumsong
- Tumyang
- Tunesang
- Tungbamphe - Chethare
- Tungbamphe - Mewakhole
- Tungbamphe - Nembang
- Tungbanphe
- Tungbaphu - Nalbo
- Tunghang
- Tungkamphs
- Tungkong - Chaobisia
- Tungkong - CHethare
- Tunglung
- Tunghang
- Tupunge

- Sapla
- Sapta
- Sardaphe
- Saring
- Sawaden
- Sayorana
- Sendang
- Sedemba - Mabho
- Sedemba - Sambahang
- Selling
- Semhang
- Sene
- Senehang
- Sengsaugbo
- Sengwangyang
- Sere
- Serma
- Serangchongbang
- Settling
- Sewa
- Sialungma
- Siba
- Silimbo
- Sinehang
- Sing - Thebe
- Sing Maden - Khewa
- Sing Maden - Tilling
- Singak
- Singdaba
- Singgokhang
- Singh - Kurungbhong
- Singjango
- Singokua
- Singthape
- Singyemba
- Sigu
- Skuwaba
- Sobegu
- Sodemba
- Sodung
- Sokiklumba
- Song
- Songbamphe
- Sambahangphe
- Songbo
- Songmi
- Songrungbang
- Songyokpa - Chaubisia
- Songyokpa - Phago
- Songyokpa - Kurumbang
- Subasang - Lingden
- Subasong - Lingkhim
- Subasong - Tambarkhole
- Suguwa
- Suhang
- Sukarengba
- Suknawab
- Sungwapak

=== U ===
- Umdeme
- Unglingba
- Unjumba
- Ussuk

=== W ===
- Wabungia
- Wade
- Wahek
- Waji - Chaobisia
- Waji - Phedapea
- Waji - Athraya
- Wanem - Phago
- Warakpa
- Warupa
- Wayahnag-Kajum
- Wayam Kajum
- Wegu
- Werniba
- Wetupma
- Wobungia
- Wodokba
- Woyang
- Worumhang

=== Y ===
- Yakso
- Yakpaden
- Yambhota
- Yangboku
- Yangboten
- Yangdem
- Yangdemba
- Yanghimba
- Yangnam
- Yangrokia
- Yangsata
- Yangseba
- Yangsoba
- Ya ngwago
- Yangya
- Yanroke
- Yanwabhu
- Yawa
- Yekten
- Yengdem
- Yengden
- Yengdemba
- Yohimbang
- Yokippa
- Yokpangden
- Yoksoba
- Yoksuba
- Yoksuma
- Yongatemba
- Yongden - thopra
- Yongeywa
- Yonghang
- Yongya*Yongya
- Yungsingba (Sanyak)
- Yakyuk

== See also ==
- Limbu nugo hang
- Limbu language
- Limbu script
- Limbuwan Gorkha War history
- Rambahadur Limbu
- Limbuwan
- Sikkim
- Limbuwan Autonomy
- Limbu Festivals
- Chasok Tangnam
