= Jaari 2 =

Jaari 2: Song of Chyabrung
- Theatrical release poster
- Directed by: Upendra Subba
- Written by: Upendra Subba
- Produced by: Ram Babu Gurung; Madhu Mijar; Jiban Gurung
- Starring: Dayahang Rai; Miruna Magar; Bijay Baral; Buddhi Tamang; Reecha Sharma
- Cinematography: Sanjay Lama
- Edited by: Nimesh Shrestha
- Music by: Kobid Bazra
- Production company: Baasuri Films
- Distributed by: Byankatesh Entertainment; Tea Folks Films
- Release date: 7 November 2025
- Running time: 143 minutes
- Country: Nepal
- Language: Nepali
- Budget: est.रू3.5 crore (US$230,000)
- Box office: est.रू6.24 crore (US$400,000)

Jaari 2: Song of Chyabrung (Nepali: जारी २: सङ अफ च्याब्रुङ) is a 2025 Nepalese social drama film written and directed by Upendra Subba. The film stars Dayahang Rai, Miruna Magar, and Bijay Baral, reprising their roles from the first film, alongside Buddhi Tamang, and Reecha Sharma. The film is produced by Ram Babu Gurung, Madhu Mijar, and Jiban Gurung under the banners of Baasuri Films in association with Kabaddi Films. It is the sequel to the 2023 blockbuster film Jaari.

It was initially supposed to be released on September 19 on the occasion of Constitution day in Nepal but postponed due to Nepalese Gen Z protests. It released in cinemas worldwide on 7 November 2025, among mixed reviews. Its primary critique centered on the forced introduction of the Maoist insurgency and an attempt to juggle multiple themes including relationship struggles, the cultural significance of Chyabrung, political conflict, and religious conversion. This thematic overload eliminated the unique charm and focus of its predecessor, Jaari, resulting in a narrative that felt both unconvincing and rushed.

== Synopsis ==
Continuing the story of the first film, Jaari 2 follows the journey of Namsang and his wife Hangma as they embark on a new chapter of their married life. The film's narrative is deeply rooted in the culture of the Limbu community and revolves around the Chyabrung, a traditional drum that symbolizes love, identity and resilience. The film explores how Namsang navigates personal struggles and the complexities of his community's traditions with the guidance of the drum's rhythms.

== Cast ==
- Dayahang Rai as Namsang
- Miruna Magar as Hangma
- Bijay Baral as Mangal Singh
- Buddhi Tamang
- Reecha Sharma as Comrade Sunita
- Pushkar Gurung as Subba Sundhante, Hangma's father
- Prem Subba as Subba Sher Bahadur, Namsang's father
- Manhang Lawoti
- Bishnu Moktan
- Kamal Mani Nepal as BK
- Anil Subba as Bardhoj
- Rekha Limbu as Numa, Bardhoj's wife

== Production ==
The official announcement for Jaari 2 was made on April 14, 2025 (Nepali New Year 2082), with the release of the film's first look poster, which featured Dayahang Rai playing the Chaybrung. Filming for the movie took place entirely in the scenic district of Panchthar, a region known for its rich natural and cultural beauty. The shooting schedule was completed in 36 days. The film's slogan is "Song of Chyabrung", highlighting its focus on the traditional Limbu folk instrument.

== Soundtrack ==
The music of the film is composed by Sushant Gautam and Manoj Thapa Magar, while Kobid Bazra provided the background score for the film. The first song of the film titled "Amlari Phool" was released on September 3, 2025.

No.	Title	Lyrics	Music	Singer	Length
1.	"Amlari Phool"	Sushma Sigdel	Sushant Gautam	Abhigya Ghimire, Bikash Limbu	3:00
2.	"Yuma Hajuri"	Hark Saud	Manoj Thapa Magar	Manoj Thapa Magar, Sunita Thegim	4:51
Total length:					7:51
