= Lomba =

Lomba may refer to:

== Places ==
- the Portuguese word for "hill"

=== Cape Verde ===
- Lomba, Cape Verde, on the island of Fogo

=== Portugal ===
- Lomba, a civil parish in Amarante Municipality,
- Lomba, a civil parish in the Gondomar Municipality
- Lomba, a civil parish in the Sabugal Municipality

In the archipelago of the Azores

- Lomba (Lajes das Flores), a civil parish in the municipality of Lajes das Flores, Flores
- Lomba da Fazenda, a civil parish in the municipality of Nordeste, São Miguel
- Lomba da Maia, a civil parish in the municipality of Ribeira Grande, São Miguel
- Lomba de São Pedro, a civil parish in the municipality of Ribeira Grande, São Miguel
- Lomba do Pós, a settlement in the municipality of Povoação, São Miguel

== Other uses ==
- Lomba (film)
- Lomba (surname)
- Raageshwari Loomba, Indian musician and singer
