= Limbu people =

Indigenous ethnic group of Limbuwan, Nepal, Sikkim

Yakthung
ᤕᤠᤰᤌᤢᤱ
- Limbu people celebrating chasok tangnam

Total population
- Nepal India Bhutan UK

Regions with significant populations
- Nepal: 414,704 (2021) Koshi: 387,515 Madhesh: 528 Bagmati: 23,893 Gandaki: 1,493 Lumbini: 642 Karnali: 221 Sudurpashchim: 412 Bhutan: 1,800: India: 163,000 (2011) Sikkim: 60,000 West Bengal: 56,000 Assam: 37,000 Uttarakhand: 1,800 Meghalaya: 1,200 Manipur: 1,100 Arunachal: 1000 UK: 15,000 (2015)

Languages
- Limbu language Others Nepali

Religion
- Predominantly: Kiratism 80.2% Minorities: Hinduism,Christianity:19.8%(2021)

Related ethnic groups
- Yakkha; Rai; Lepcha; Dhimal; Other Sino-Tibetan people

The Limbu (Limbu: ᤕᤠᤰᤌᤢᤱ) are a Kirati tribe ethnolinguistic group indigenous to the Himalayan region of eastern Nepal, northeastern India and western Bhutan. In India, the Limbus live in the states of Sikkim, Assam, Nagaland and northern West Bengal, i.e. North Bengal.

Subba is a title given by the Shah Kings only to Limbu village chiefs. Subba was not part of the indigenous Limbu terminology, but now the two terms are almost interchangeable. It was how the village chiefs were distinguished from other villagers in Limbu tribe. Family lineage of the village chiefs are often found with their surname as Subba.

Their history is said to be written in a book called Bangsawoli (Genealogy), also known as Bansawali. Some ancient families have kept copies. There are hundreds of Limbu clans and tribes, classified under their tribe or subnational entity or according to their place of origin.

The Chinese text Po-ou-Yeo-Jing, translated in 308 AD, refers to the Yi-ti-Sai (barbarians bordering on the north), a name which is an exact equivalent of The Limbu, were also one of the earliest inhabitants of Sikkim. The name of the Indian state itself is a combination of two Limbu words: su, which means "new", and khyim, which means "palace" or "house".

== Geographical distribution ==
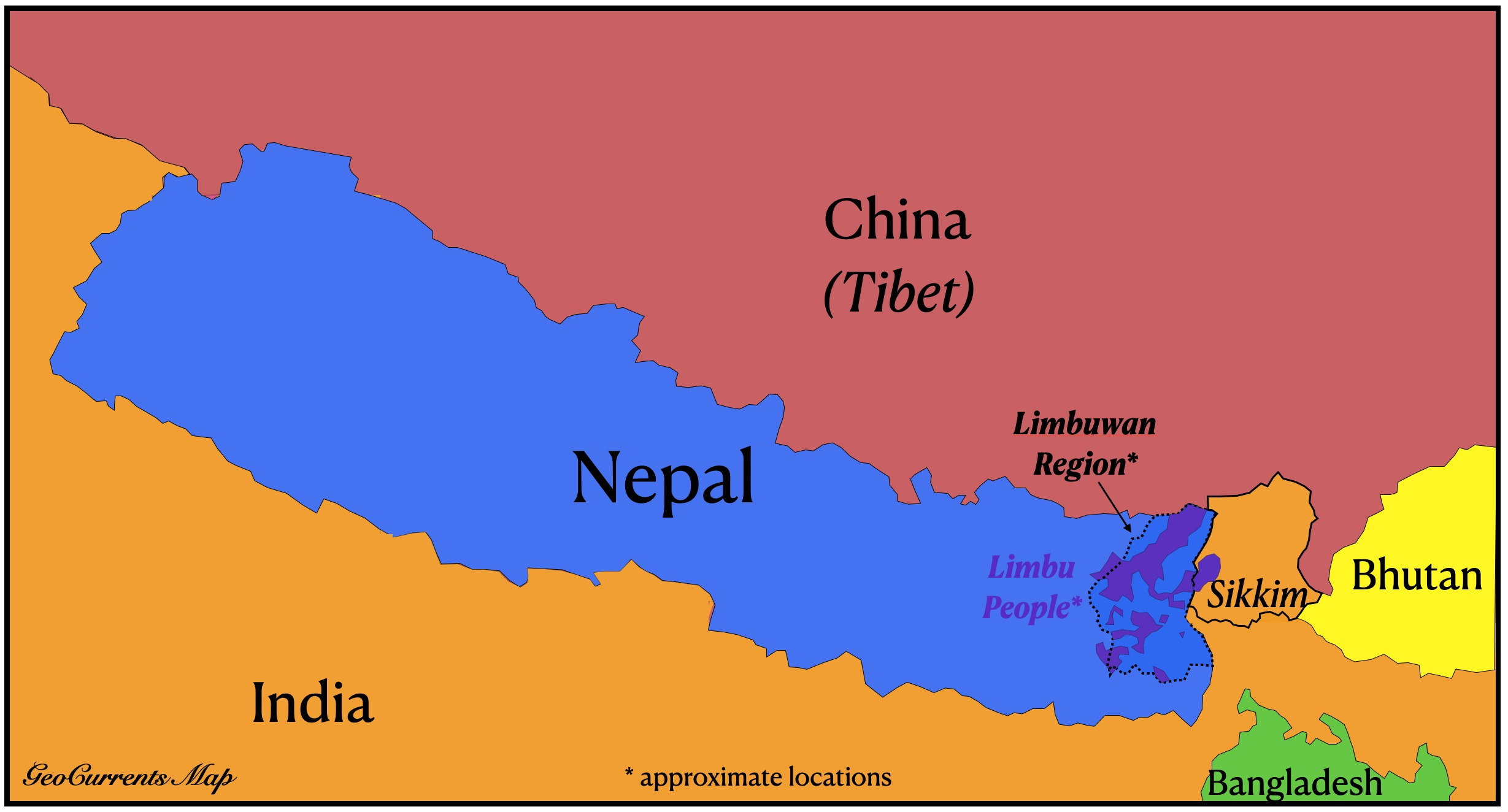
Limbu ethnic Inhabited region in nepal and small part of Sikkim

2021 Nepal census classifies the Limbu people within the broader social group of Mountain/Hill Janajati. At the time of the 2021 Nepal census, 4,14,704 people (1.43%) of the population of Nepal) were Limbu. The frequency of Limbu people by province was as follows:

- Koshi Province (8.01%)
- Bagmati Province (0.5%)
- Gandaki Province (0.2%)
- Madhesh Province (0.1%)
- Lumbini Province (0.1%)
- Karnali Province (0.02%)
- Sudurpashchim Province (0.03%)

The estimated population of the Limbu is 6,00,000, mainly in the districts of Tehrathum, Dhankuta, Taplejung, Morang, Sunsari, Jhapa, Panchthar, Ilam in Nepal and several states of Northeast-India . The frequency of Limbu people was higher than national average (1.0%) in the following districts. These are all within the Koshi Province or "Limbuwan".

- Panchthar (43.4%)
- Taplejung (42.6%)
- Tehrathum (36.4%)
- Ilam (16.8%)
- Dhankuta (13.9%)
- Jhapa (7.7%)
- Sankhuwasabha (5.7%)
- Morang (4.3%)
- Sunsari (3.6%)
- Taplejung (5.1%)
- Lalitpur (1.3%)

Indian, Bhutan and other countries

Significant numbers of the Limbu population are also located in the eastern and western districts of Sikkim . Significant numbers are scattered throughout the cities of Darjeeling, and Kalimpong in West Bengal, Assam, Nagaland, Bhutan, and Myanmar. Some have migrated to the United Kingdom, Hong Kong, the United States, and other countries.

== History ==
Historical Background Ancient Era:

- Pre-Vedic origins: Limbu people are believed to have settled in eastern Nepal before the arrival of Indo-Aryan groups. They are pre-Vedic, Mongoloid people with strong roots in the Himalayan region.
- Kirata Kingdoms (circa 800 BCE - 300 CE):
  - The Limbus were part of the larger Kirat civilization, which ruled the Kathmandu Valley and eastern hills.
  - Ancient texts like the Mahabharata and Puranas mention the Kirats as warriors from the east.

🏯 Limbuwan Confederation:

- Limbuwan Kingdom (before 18th century):
  - Limbuwan was an independent confederation of 10 Limbu kingdoms.
  - Each was ruled by a local king called Subba or Hang.
  - They had their own laws, customs, and land tenure systems.
  - The region was culturally and politically distinct from central Nepal.

🗡️ Gorkha Unification (Late 1700s):

- In the 1770s, Limbuwan was annexed by King Prithvi Narayan Shah during the unification of Nepal.
- A treaty known as the “Limbuwan-Gorkha Treaty” (circa 1774) guaranteed the Limbus:
  - Autonomy over land (Kipat system).
  - Right to maintain their language, customs, and traditions.
- Over time, however, autonomy eroded due to state centralization, Hinduization, and land reforms.

🔹Modern History

- Land loss and marginalization:
  - The Kipat system was abolished in the 1960s under the Panchayat regime, leading to large-scale loss of ancestral lands.
- Ethnic revival & identity movements:
  - Since the 1990s, Limbus have engaged in cultural and political activism, especially during and after the People’s War (1996–2006).
  - Movements like the Limbuwan Autonomous Region demand greater rights and recognition of their ancestral land and identity.
- Language and Script revival:
  - Revival of Sirijunga script and promotion of Yakthung culture has gained momentum, particularly among youth and diaspora.

== Language ==
Limbu (Limbu: ᤕᤠᤰᤌᤢᤱ ᤐᤠᤴ, yakthuṅ pan) is a Sino-Tibetan language spoken by the Limbu people of Nepal and Northeastern India(particularly West Bengal, Sikkim, Assam and Nagaland) as well as expatriate communities in Bhutan. The Limbu refer to themselves as Yakthung and their language as Yakthungpan.Yakthungpan has four main dialects: Phedape, Chhathare, Tambarkhole and Panthare dialects.

Official Status

The Language Commission of Nepal has recommended Limbu language as official language in Koshi Province. Chulachuli Rural Municipality, Mangsebung Rural Municipality and Phalgunanda Rural Municipality have recognized Limbu language as an official working language.

In India, the state of Sikkim has recognized Limbu language as an additional official language for the purpose of preservation of culture and tradition in the state. The official weekly publication Sikkim Herald has a Limbu Edition.

Sirijunga Script or Yakthung/Limbu Script

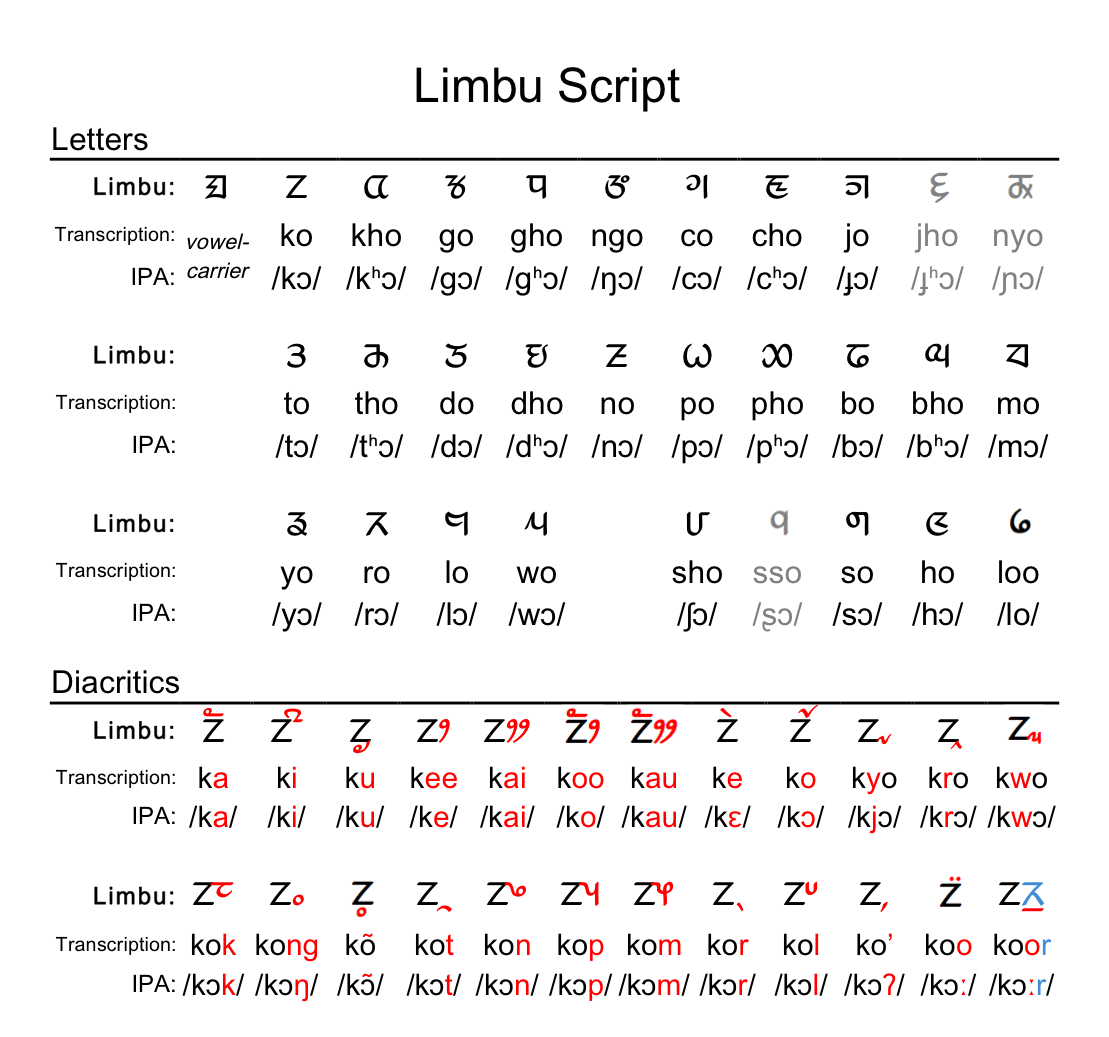
The Limbu script. Grey letters are obsolete.

the Limbu script (Sirijanga) had been designed by the Limbu King Sirijanga Hang in the 9th century. The Sirijanga script was later redesigned and re-introduced by Te-ongsi Sirijunga Xin Thebe . As Te-ongsi Sirijunga Xin Thebe spent most of his time in the development of Yakthungpan, Yatkhung culture, and Limbu script; he is considered as the reincarnation of the 9th century King Sirijanga.

== Limbu traditional architecture ==
The house of the Limbu is a symbolic representation of a goddess of the Limbu community called yuma. The details of the windows and doors are embroidered with wood carvings depicting different flowers which are used by the Limbu during rituals. Some decorative embroideries done in the wood carvings of the door and windows of the house are the direct representation of gold jewelry worn by Limbu women. In a traditional house of the Limbu, the skirting of the wall is generally painted manually with red mud paint. This is also a symbolic representation of the patuka or the belt worn by the Limbu women.

The major distinct element of the house in the muring-sitlam or the main pillar/column of the house which is in the centre of the house in the ground floor. This pillar is generally believed by the Limbu people as the shrine where Yuma goddess resides in the house. Thus, to pay their gratitude they perform ritualistic prayers and offerings around the pillar, usually twice a year.

These houses can be found at Eastern Nepal and western part of Sikkim, India. These houses are similar to other communities due to acculturation between different communities living in the vicinity. The evolution of the form and spaces of the houses have been inspired by the everyday lifestyle and culture of the people which is similar in many communities. Therefore, nowadays a Limbu house is difficult to identify through an exterior perspective.

Use of geometrical shapes as circle, triangle and square in certain pattern, painted with different colors can be found on the facade of the buildings which is only done by Limbu tribe. Besides that, display of the symbol called Silam Sakma (a ritualistic element used by the phedangmas or tribal priests) in the house elevation has been a symbol/logo for identifying with the Limbu community. This symbol is diamond shaped and has 9 concentric diamond layers supported by two axes at the centre, one vertical and one horizontal. These days, this symbol is seen in places like the entry gates, balcony railing of the house, etc. It is also worn by the community people on their left chest during an event.

Currently, the traditional houses are endangered. People are also unable to bear expenses for wood carvings for the embroideries which has resulted in the extinction of local craftsmen and hence the traditional design itself.

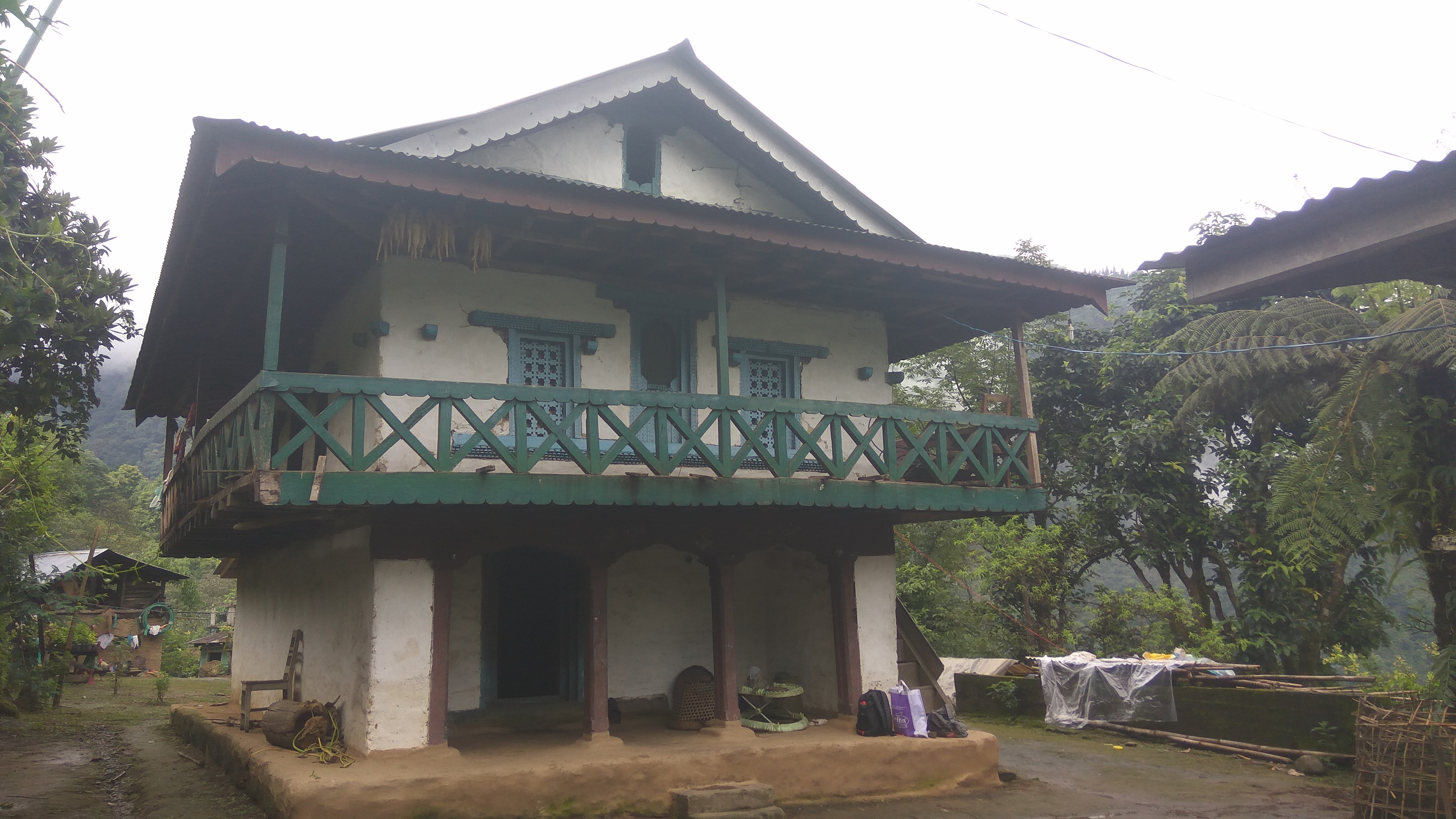
Limbu house in Hee- kengbari village in West Sikkim, Sikkim, India

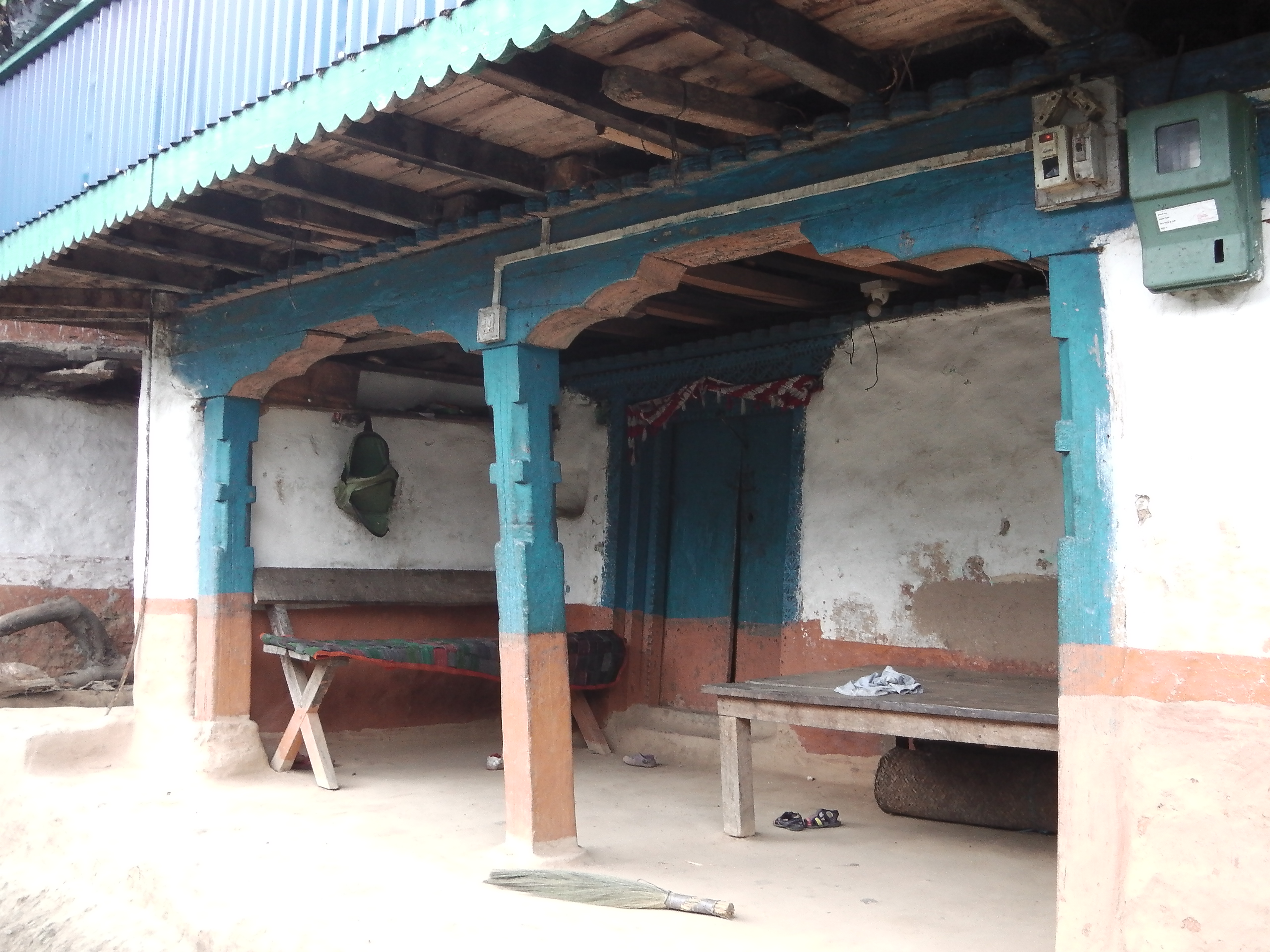
Sikuwa(in Nepali term) or a verandah of the house

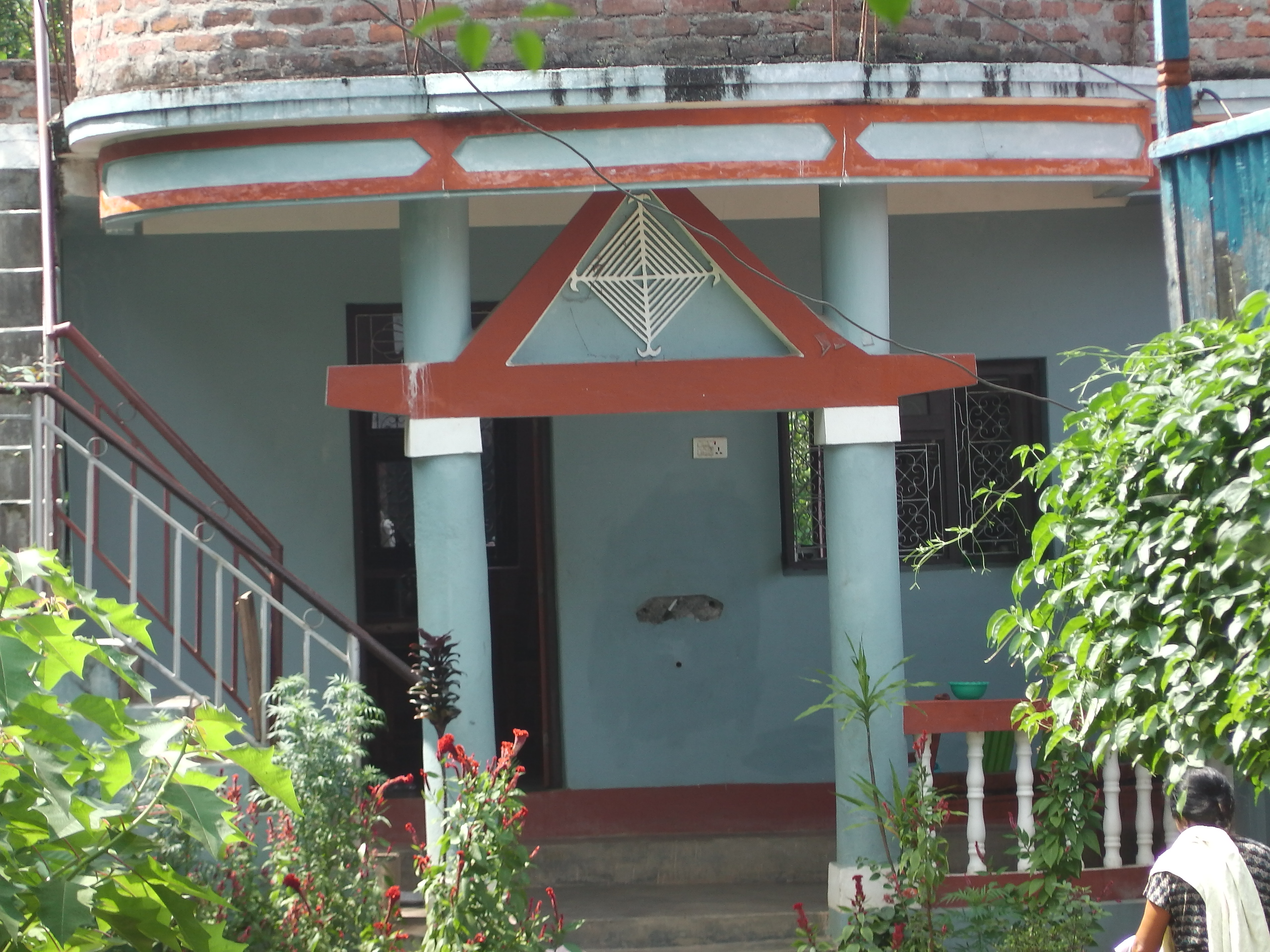
"Silam-Sakma" is the name of the symbol/logo that identifies the Limbu/Yakthung tribal community.

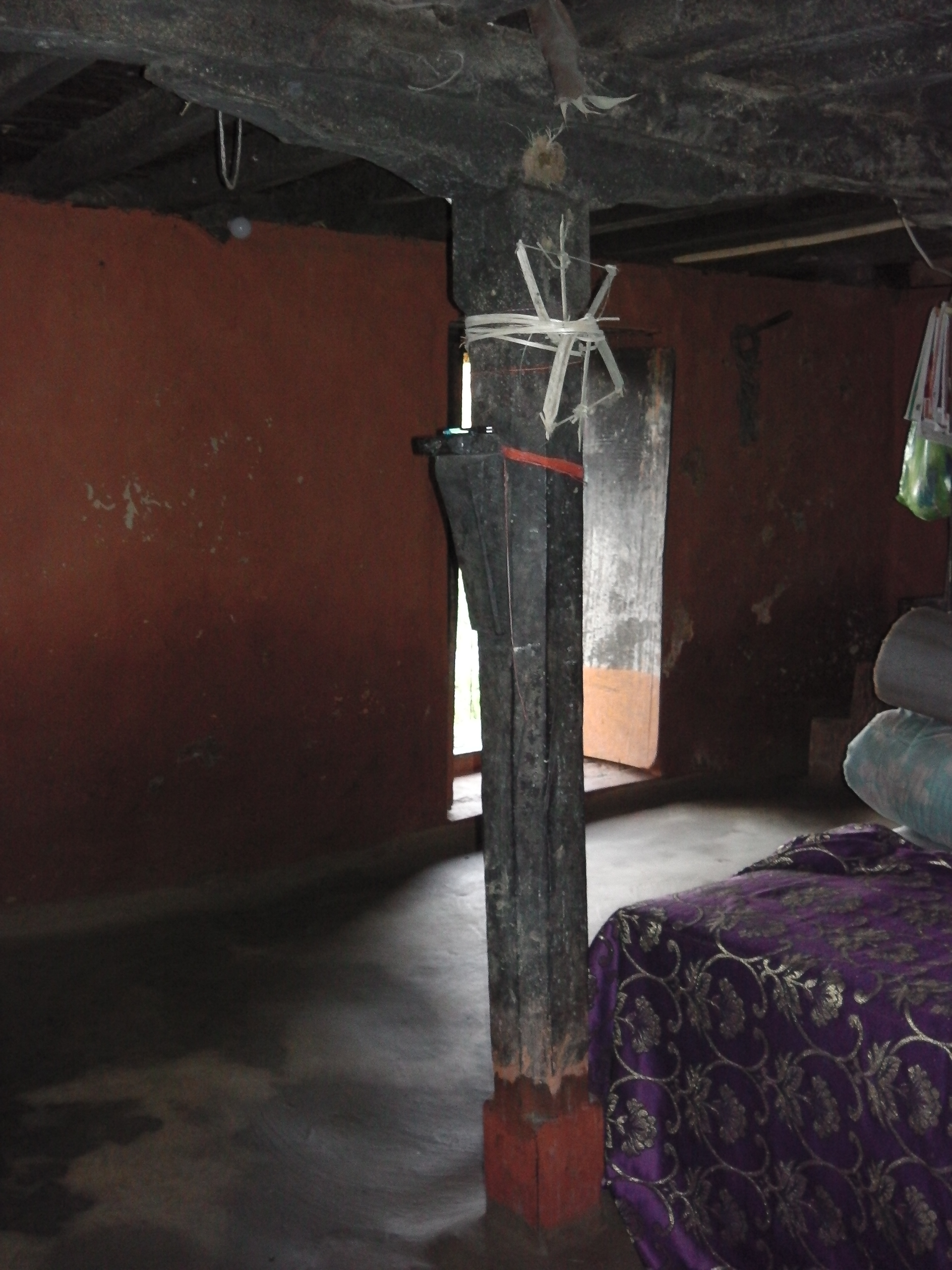
Muring-Sitlam" or the main pillar of the house

== Occupation ==
The Limbu people have traditionally been agriculturalists, but over time, their occupations have diversified.

🔹 Agriculture (Main Occupation)

- Most Limbus are historically subsistence farmers.
- Cultivate rice, millet, maize, barley, and vegetables on terraced fields.
- Also grow cash crops like:
  - Cardamom (Alaichi) – a major export product
  - Ginger and turmeric
- Use traditional tools like halo (plough) and Kodalo (hoe).

Animal Husbandry

- Raise goats, pigs, cows, buffaloes, chickens for meat, milk, and rituals.
- Animals are also part of social customs and sacrifices in Kirat religion.

Traditional Skills

- Weaving and knitting by Limbu women (for traditional dresses)dresses).
- Traditional healing and shamanic roles (by Phedangma, Yeba/Yema, Samba) in spiritual life.

🔹Modern Occupations

Government and Education

- Many Limbus now work in:
  - Teaching
  - Civil service
  - Police and military
  - Local government and administrative jobs

Foreign Employment

- A significant number have migrated to:
  - India (Darjeeling, Sikkim, Assam)
  - Hong Kong, UK, Middle East, Singapore, etc.
- Work in:
  - Security services (especially in Hong Kong)
  - Domestic work
  - Construction
  - Hospitality industry

Military Service

- Limbus have a long tradition of joining the:
  - British Gurkha Army
  - Indian Army
  - Singapore Police Force
  - Nepal Army
- Known for bravery, loyalty, and discipline.

🔹 Business and Trade

- Many are now engaged in:
  - Small shops, retail businesses
  - Agriculture-based trade (e.g. cardamom, tea)
  - Tourism and homestays in eastern Nepal

🔹 Emerging Fields

- Media and Journalism
- Music and cultural arts
- Politics and activism (e.g. Limbuwan movement)
- NGO/INGO work
- Technology and freelancing (in urban and foreign-educated youth)

== Wedding practices ==
Limbu generally marry within their own community. A Limbu is not allowed to marry within their own clans for up to 3 generations back to ensure that they are not related. Cross-cousin marriage is not allowed in Limbu culture. Marriage between a man and a woman outside the clan is also possible either by arrangement or by mutual consent of the man and woman in question. Being matriarchal tribe, females are given due respect.

The marriages are mostly arranged by parents. Asking for a woman's hand is an important ceremony. In that system, the woman can ask for anything, including any amount of gold, silver, etc. This is practiced to confirm that the man is financially secure enough to keep the bride happy. A few days after the wedding, the man's family members have to visit the woman's house with a piglet and some alcoholic and non-alcoholic beverages, depending upon the financial status of his house. The most important ceremonies of a Limbu wedding take place in the groom's house rather than in the bride's because the bride has to stay with her husband. There are two special dances in this ceremony, one is called Yalakma or dhan nach in Nepali (rice harvest dance) and "Kelangma" Limbu pronunciation: [ke laːŋma] or Chyabrung Limbu pronunciation: [t͡ɕjabruŋ] in Nepali. The Yalakma Limbu pronunciation: [jaˀlaːkma] is characterized by men and women dancing in a slow circle, whereas the Kelangma Limbu pronunciation: [ke laːŋma] consists of complex footwork synchronized with the beat of the drums. Anyone can join the dance, which can last for many hours. The Yalakma Limbu pronunciation: [jaˀlaːkma] can also be a celebration of the harvest season or other social occasions.

It is conventionally said that the customs and traditions of Limbus were established in the distant past by Sawa Yethang Limbu pronunciation: [sawa jethaŋ] (council of eight kings).

== Religion and festivals ==
The Limbu follow the social rules and regulation of Mundhum oral 'scripture' and a religious book. Their religion is known as Yuma samyo. Traditionally, the Limbu bury their dead, but due to the influence of Hinduism, cremation is becoming popular. Limbu people follow Yuma religion. Some Limbu have converted to Christianity. A very different reformist tradition was established by the Limbu guru Phalgunanda, who established the 'Satyahang' religion.

== Traditional music and singing styles ==
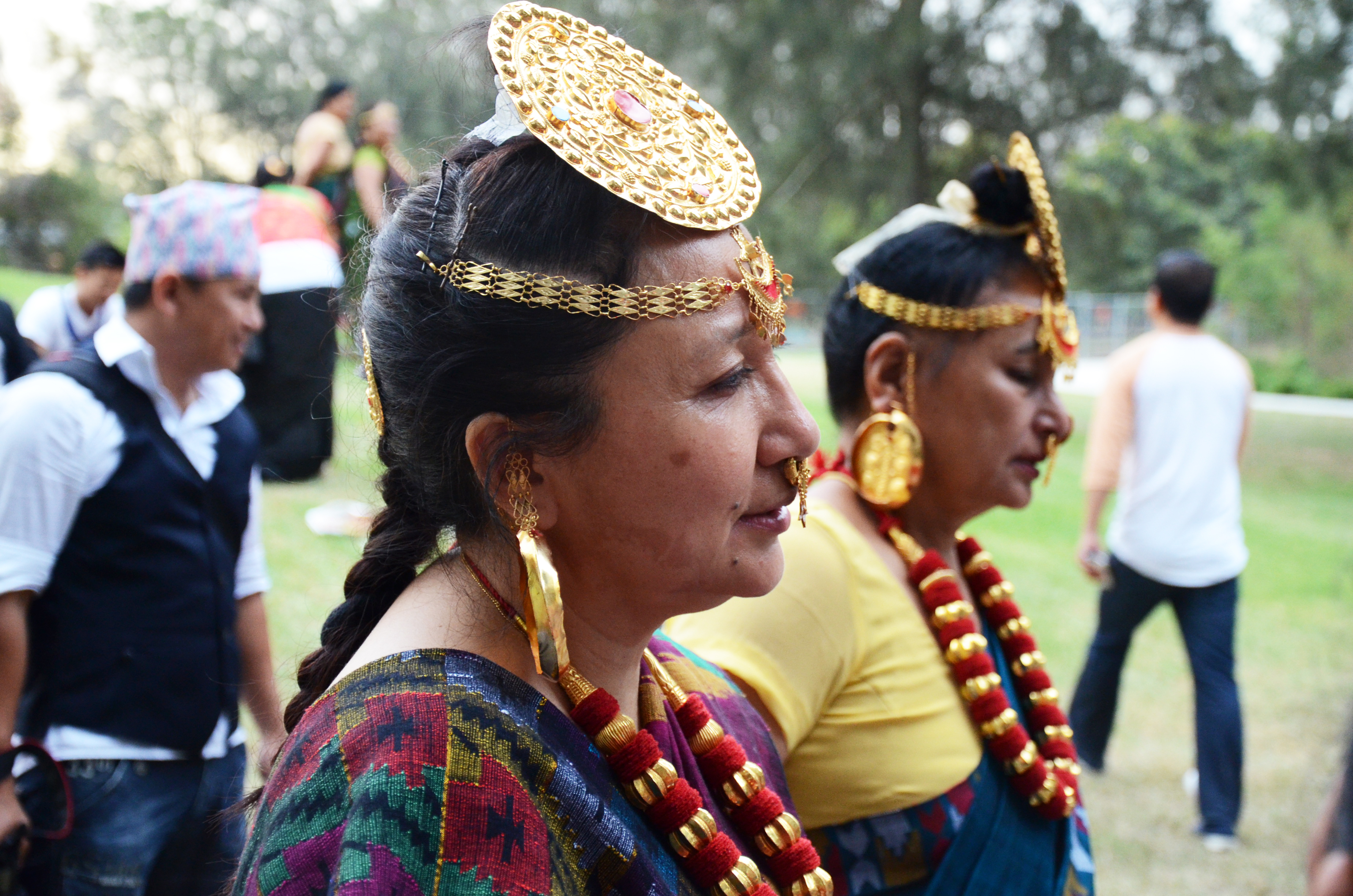
Kirati Limbu women performing Kelang (Limbu pronunciation: [keːlaːŋ]) dance during the festival of Kirat festival Udhauli 2012 in Sydney

Limbu have a strong belief in. Yumawad is a type of religious scripture which has been kept alive by their religious leaders and handed down verbally from generation to generation. Some of the retellings of Yumawad are also included in Limbu traditional music with social stories, dreams, and everyday life. There has been a rich tradition of the Limbu singing their folk songs. Their folk songs can be divided into the following groups:

1. Khyali – a conversational song in which young lash and lads sing in very poetic expressions and in a very sweet tone.
2. Traditional Love Songs:
  1. Sakpa Palam Limbu pronunciation: [paːlam]Samlo – This song is sung during the Kusakpa Yaalang Limbu pronunciation: [jaˀlaːŋ] dance in a fast beat.
  2. Kemba Palam Limbu pronunciation: [paːlam]Samlo – This song is sung during the Kemba Yeaaˀlang dance in a slow beat.
  3. Domke Akma Palam Limbu pronunciation: [paːlam] Samlo – It is sung when doing the normal chores and also during the Domke Akma dance.
3. Hakpare Samlo – this song is sung by middle-aged men and women who have interest in Mundhum and who are well versed in it. One can find spiritual and worldly specialties in this song.
4. Nisammang Limbu pronunciation: [nisamːaŋ]Sewa Samlo – This song is sung during religious functions. It is a devotional song. Dancing is an important aspect of life among Limbus. Based on acting style, the following types of dances are performed:
  1. Dance performed after origin of life: This type of dance is known as Ke Lang or Chyabrung dance. The dance imitates the actions of animals, insects and any form of living beings.
  2. Agricultural dance: Under this type of dance there are:
    1. Yea Kakma – This dance is performed in the evening after the crops are reaped.
    2. Damke Akme – This dance is performed while sowing crops.
  3. War dance: This form of dance is known as 'Nahangma Limbu pronunciation: [nahaŋma]'. It is performed during "Nahangma Limbu pronunciation: [nahaŋma]" – their religious function. Before Nahangma dance, Manggena traditional ritual is performed at home and all the blood relatives, cousins are present. During Manggena, stone refer as god with red tika offered is put on banana leaf. A large adult black homegrown pig is killed and present to phedangba. A Junglefowl is given to each person according to match with person's age and gender same as of their Junglefowl. Person who cannot be present due to problems will be done by their closest family member on their behalf. Phedangba say vision of each person when they present their own Junglefowl and later Phedangma beheaded the Junglefowl and sprinkle the blood. They eat their own charcoal burned Junglefowl liver with salt eaten with rice. The rest of meat are prepared for meal Bhutuwa or mixed yangben with rice for dinner. After the Manggena, Nahangma is performed that his spirit has become strong and reached at the top of Chuklung and returned from Chuklung. Chuklung means top of Himalayas. However, this can be done by only those who have no father. In this dance, only adult males and "Shamani" priests can take part. During the dance, they carry a Phedza in their right hand and a domesticated young adult male Junglefowl in their left hand or sword in their right hand and a shield in their left hand, or an arrow in their right hand and a bow in their left hand.

The traditional ritual are done according to the tribes and clans. Some tribes will not eat chicken or buff or mutton while some tribes have different way in celebrating war dance ritual.

  1. Historical dance: In this dance form, the historical war of ten Limbu fought in Aambepojoma Limbu pronunciation: [ambɛˀpɔd͡ʑɔˀma] Kamketlungma is depicted.
  2. Mysterious and ancient dance performed by Shamani priests: this type of dance is known as Phungsok Lang, Tongsing Lang. The dance is performed only by the Shamani priests.

== Traditional food ==
Alcohol is significantly and religiously important to the Limbu culture. Limbu usually made their traditional dish from homegrown domesticated livestock meats like pork, fish and yak over factory farming. They are also domesticated for religious purpose. In general, they consume dhal bhat tarkari with pickle. Dhal (Lentils soup), bhat (rice), tarkari (vegetables) and different kinds of achar(pickle). Limbu people always use Phedza to prepare meats. Famous Limbu cuisines are

- Chembikeek sumbak (oil-fried kinema with spices), (Kinema: fermented soyabean)
- Chhurpi (made of Yak, buttermilk)
- Filinge achar (Niger seed pickle)
- Gundruk Nepalese (fermented leafy vegetables with soup)
- Kaan sadeko (fried pork ears)
- Khareng (maize/ millet/ wheat roti baked and cooked)
- Khoreng (Baked roti made from wheat/ millet/ buckwheat/ riceflour)
- Kinema (fermented beans with soup)
- Lunghakcha (baked, maize flour rolled in maize khosela)
- Macha ko siddra (dried river fish)
- Mandokpenaa thee (fermented millet beverage served with Tongba)
- Mohi sumbak (oil-fried mohi with spices)
- Mula ko acchar (radish pickle)
- Nambong muchhi (Silam mixed with chilli, dry pickle)
- Pena manda (millet flour cooked in more water)
- Phando (chutney made from mix of soybean and chilli powder)
- Phanokeek sumbak (oil-fried fermented bamboo shoots with spices)
- Phung khey sejonwa (maize/millet distilled liquor)
- Poponda (finger millet flour wrapped in leaves)
- [Faksa Dameko] (Pan-seared pork)
- Pork sekuwa (spicy chopped)
- Sagee sumbak (neetle tender shots, flower/fruits curry)
- Sakhekya (dry meat beef)
- Sargyang (pork blood intestine)
- Sekuwa (pork, chicken, vegetables skewers)
- Sibligaan (wild edible greens with bitter taste and high in antioxidant)
- Sijongwaa aara
- Sigolya and Penagolya (Baked, millet or barley flour rolled)
- Sungur ko khutta daal (pork feet in cooked lentil soup)
- Sura-keek sumbak (oil-fried moldy cheese with spices)
- Sura sumbak (oil-fried cheese with spices)
- Tongba traditional drink
- Wamyuk (hen's inner feathers, liver, hands, wings, intestine and spices curry)
- Yakhoo Kusee muchee (seed of pumpkin chilli)
- Yangben (wild edible lichen)
- Yangben-Faksa (Pork Curry with Yangben)
- Yangben sumbak (pork blood liver with yangben)
- Yumé (bhutuwa, a religious Mangena food meats cooked in blood)

There are some taboos while eating the foods. They use a variety of plants and herbs for medicine. Limbu always welcome their guests with foods, Tongba (traditional beverage millet beer), Rakshi (traditional alcoholic beverage), Lassi (yoghurt milk drink), water and homemade fruit juices.

== Folk musical instruments ==
Limbu musical instruments include the following:

- Chyabrung
- Yalambar Baja
- Chethya/Yethala
- Mephrama
- Miklakom
- Niyari Hongsing Ke
- Negra
- Phakwa
- The Phamuk is a melody instrument of Limbus which includes three bamboo pipes each about 4 cm thick are attached together side by side.
- Phenjekom
- Puttungey
- Simikla
- Taa is made of brass, 25 cm in diameter and one pair of cymbals weighs one kilo. It is played by unmarried Limbu women in Ke Lang.
- Tetlafakwa Limbu pronunciation: [tɛˀlapʰɛkwa]
- Ting
- Tungeba
- Ungdung
- Yea Pongey

== Traditional sports ==
For the Limbu people, Archery has always been considered as the main traditional sport. Archery often involves religious demonstrations and rituals. Historically, Limbu cavalry archers were important when resisting invasions before the pre-Nepal era. The word Limbu itself came from the word Lim-pfungh which in translation means "Shooting-Arrows" or "Act of archery".

There are legends about the beginning of the Limbuwan–Gorkha War. In these legends, a Gorkha military general met a Limbu Limbu pronunciation: [jaktʰuŋ] hunter in a forest. When the general asked the hunter about his presence and what he was doing, the Limbu Limbu pronunciation: [jaktʰuŋ] hunter replied "Lim-pfungh". The Gorkha army later experienced the fierceness from the Limbu Limbu pronunciation: [jaktʰuŋ]-Tribes' horseback archers for years during the Limbuwan–Gorkha War. Thus, the name "Limbu" was recorded on the papers of the Gorkhas to describe the Limbu Limbu pronunciation: [jaktʰuŋ] people. However, after the success of the Gorkha invasion, horse breeding and keeping declined swiftly in Limbu territories.

Bare-hand Wrestling has also been practised among the Limbu men during festivals. This was also used to settle personal matters after a festive drinking in which the losing wrestler would have to pay the winner by buying him a drink or inviting him to his house for a drink of traditional tongba Limbu pronunciation: [tɔːŋba]. naːnt͡ɕʰiŋma is the term for wrestling in Limbupan.

== Notable Limbu people ==
Kings

- Buddhi Karna Raya Khebang Limbu- a king of Morang kingdom

Politics

- Bhim Hang Limboo - Indian politician from Sikkim
- Sanchaman Limboo - fourth Chief Minister of Sikkim, India
- Ram Bahadur Limboo - Indian politician from Sikkim
- Ganesh Kumar Limbu - Indian politician from Assam
- Govinda Subba -first governor of Province No. 1 Nepal
- Parshuram Khapung -3rd governor of Province No. 1 Nepal
- Rajendra Prasad Lingden- Nepalese politician, former deputy prime minister and chairman of Rastriya Prajatantra Party
- Bishnu Maden - Politician and leader of Rastrya Prajatantra Party, Former Minister
- Subas Chandra Nemwang -former speaker of House of Representatives lawyer, politician and leader of CPN(UML), Former Chairperson in Constitution Assembly, Nepal
- Suhang Nembang - Nepalese politician and lawyer currently serving as a Member of the House of Representatives
- Sukra Raj Sonyok (Songyokpa) - Chief Whip of Nepali Congress 2003-2005
- Indra Hang Subba - Indian politician
- Moni Kumar Subba, Indian M. P. Lok Sabha for Assam
- Narendra Kumar Subba - Indian politician from Sikkim
- Ram Bahadur Subba - Indian politician from Sikkim
- Shiva Maya Tumbahamphe - former deputy speaker of the House of Representatives. and Minister of Law, Justice and Parliamentary Affairs Nepal.
- Indra Bahadur Angbo - MP and former minister of Koshi province.
- Bhawani Prasad Khapung - Nepalese politician, Former minister of Health and population of Nepal
- Dig Bahadur Limbu - Nepalese politician, minister of youth and sports.

Education- historian, poet, professor

- Iman Xin Chemjong (1904-1975 AD) - Limbu historian, author, writer on Limbu Kirant at the Tribhuwan University, first Kirat historian.
- Balkrishna Mabuhang - associate professor, writer
- Bairagi Kainla - Poet, former Chancellor of Nepal Academy and researcher into the folklore of the Limbu people.
- Phalgunanda Lingden - prophet of Kirat Satyahang religion
- Desh Subba - author and poet
- Tanka Bahadur Subba, Former Vice Chancellor, Sikkim University.
- Upendra Subba - Poet
- Te-ongsi Sirijunga Xin Thebe (1704-1741 AD) - eighteenth century Limbu martyr and social worker, Yakthung sirijunga script reviver and teacher.

Music, film and media

- Deepak Limbu - Singer, winner of "First Nepali Tara" competition
- Jhuma Limbu, Nepali folk musician and researcher
- Subin Limbu - Miss Nepal 2014
- Tara Prakash Limbu - singer, music composer
- Abhaya Subba - rock singer, songwriter, composer, judge of first season of Voice of Nepal
- Dinesh Subba - composer, singer and lyricist from Darjeeling
- Malvika Subba - Television and media personality, Miss Nepal 2002 and social activist.
- Nabin Subba - Film director
- Srijana Subba - film actress

Sports

- Kiran Chemjong- Nepali footballer who plays as a goalkeeper and captains the Nepal national football team.
- Pankaj Bikram Nembang - Current president of All Nepal Football Associations, ANFA
- Laken Limbu - Nepalese international footballer
- Anjila Tumbapo Subba - Nepalese professional footballer and captain of nepali national women’s football team
- Saru Limbu - Nepalese football player, plays as midfielder for Nepali women's national football team
- Padam Limboo - Indian cricketer from Sikkim
- Anil Subba - Indian cricketer from Sikkim
- Bijay Subba - Indian cricketer from Sikkim
- Bhushan Subba - Indian cricketer from Sikkim

Public service, government, army, and police

- Captain Rambahadur Limbu - Victoria Cross holder, Her Majesty's Armed Forces, United Kingdom
- Tanka Bahadur Subba - Indian university administrator; vice chancellor of Sikkim University
- Gyan Bahadur Yakthumba- 3rd IGP of Nepal police

== See also ==
- Limbuwan
  - History of Limbuwan
- Limbu Festivals
  - Chasok Tangnam Limbu pronunciation: [t͡ɕasok tɔŋnam]
- Kiranti languages
- Limbu language
  - Sirijunga script
- Rambahadur Limbu
- Tongba beverage
- Limbu Clans and Tribes
- Kirat Yakthung Chumlung social organization
- Mundhum religion
- Ethnic groups in Nepal
- Ethnic groups in Bhutan
- Indigenous peoples of Sikkim
