= Chemjong =

Limbu surname

Chemjong, चेम्जोङ्ग्, ᤆᤣᤶᤈᤥᤅ
- Pronunciation: Chem-Jong
- Language: Limbu language

Origin
- Region of origin: Limbuwan, East Nepal, Northeast India, darjeeling, Sikkim, Assam

Other names
- Variant form: mabohang

Chemjong / ᤆᤣᤶᤈᤥᤅ is a Limbu surname. It is most common in Limbuwan, East Nepal, and Sikkim.

The term "Chemjong" in the context of Limbuwan refers to a specific historical figure, King Chemjong Hang, who played a significant role in the unification and governance of Limbuwan. However, the term "Chemjong" can also be used more broadly to refer to a lineage or a type of leadership within the Limbu community.

The origin and history of the name "Chemjong" come from the era of Lasahang (LashaHang) which was during the 7th century AD. The fifth king of the Lasahang dynasty was King Chemjong Hang. He was born in Chempojong palace in Ilam, where his mother was living. When he was born his mother had to keep him away from everyone, fearing that Chief Pathong Hang's people would come and murder him. She told him that his father's enemy would destroy him if they were to find out his true identity. He grew up to be a wise and strong individual. His mother having told him of his late father's followers in the northern part of Limbuwan, he made his way there and forged alliances with the chiefs. He made a surprise attack while everyone at Hellang palace was celebrating the marriage of one of the district chiefs. After capturing Hellang palace, he revealed his identity to all those present and they accepted him as the true ruler and heir of the late King Wedo Hang. Since he had no real name and was born in the old palace of Chempojong, the assembled chiefs decided to name him Chemjong Hang, which became his name. He once again tried to unite all of Limbuwan and succeeded in extending from present-day Panchthar, Illam, Dhankuta, Sunsari, Morang, and Jhapa. Back in those days, Morang was composed of the lower terai lands of Sunsari, Morang, and Jhapa, while northern Limbuwan was still in fragments.

== People with the surname ==
- Bishnu Chemjong- First Nepal Star
- Iman Xin Chemjong, Limbu Historian
- Kiran Chemjong – Nepalese footballer
- Sunil Chemjong – Photographer

== See also ==
- Limbu
