= Queenbala Marak =

Indian anthropologist

- Born: Guwahati, Assam

Academic background
- Education: Cotton University (BA, Hons); Gauhati University (MA); North-Eastern Hill University (PhD)
- Doctoral advisor: Tanka Bahadur Subba

Academic work
- Discipline: Anthropology
- Sub-discipline: Prehistoric archaeology, Ethnoarchaeology, Material culture, Food studies
- Institutions: North-Eastern Hill University

Queenbala Marak is an Indian anthropologist, academic and author. She is a professor at the Department of Anthropology, North-Eastern Hill University in Shillong, Meghalaya. Her areas of interest include prehistoric archaeology, ethnoarchaelogy, material culture, and food studies

== Early life and education ==
Marak was born in Guwahati, Assam to a family of Garo people, a Tibeto-Burman ethnic group indigenous to Northeast India and known for being one of the few matrilineal societies in the world. Garos primarily reside in the Garo Hills region of Meghalaya, as well as Assam, Tripura, Nagaland, and northern districts of Bangladesh. Based on geography, Garos have numerous sub-groups with distinctive culture traits.

Marak and her siblings grew up surrounded predominately by Assamese-speaking caste groups. Few Garo families resided in the city, besides hers, scattered across different areas and localities. Her parents tried their best to instil the Garo identity in their children, teaching them to speak the language and planning frequent visits to the family's parental villages: one in Garo Hills, and other in Assam-Meghalaya border.

Marak completed her secondary schooling in 1994 from St. Mary's Convent in Maligaon, Guwahati. She attended Cotton University, Guwahati for intermediate college, and graduated with an anthropology honours degree in 1997. She completed her postgraduate degree in anthropology from Gauhati University, Assam, and received her doctorate in anthropology from North-Eastern Hill University under the supervision of Tanka Bahadur Subba.

For her PhD thesis entitled “Food, Identity and Difference: An Anthropological Study among the Garos,” Marak spent three years conducting field research amongst the Garos residing in marginal areas of Bangladesh–India border and used food consumption as a means to understand the underlying social relations of the Garo culture. She received a contingency grant from Indian Council of Social Sciences Research (ICSSR)-North Eastern Regional Centre (NERC), Shillong for the printing and binding of her thesis. In 2014, Cambridge Scholars published her thesis as a book, “Food Politics: Studying Food, Identity and Difference among the Garos,” which cultural anthropologist and former professor at Woxsen University Jack David Eller called “a welcome contribution to the growing field of the anthropology and materiality of food.”

== Research ==
Marak's primary research focus is on studying her own ethnicity and community of the Garos people. As an undergraduate student, she was often asked to elaborate on the Garo social customs to a class of non-Garos. In one such instance, she was called upon by a small group to explain the Garo custom of ‘marriage by capture’. This custom, wherein a prospective groom is captured for marriage by force, is still practiced in the remote villages of Garo Hills. Marak's narration was met with laughter; regardless, she continued to entertain similar queries from her peers, using them as an opportunity to share what she knew of the Garos. She later clarified that as a teacher, when speaking of ‘marriage by capture,’ Marak is more objective, and contextualises her narration with the "intricacies of Garo kinship and social life." In the academic sphere, a person like Marak, who was formerly the subject of ethnography and has now become the author of studies about her own group, is referred to as an autoethnographer or a native anthropologist. According to Marak, her foray into native anthropology began "much before [her] professional venture, and rather unconsciously."

Marak has co-authored five books and more than fifty research papers. She has served as the principal investigator for several research projects. In 2013, she received funding from the state-run Sangeet Natak Akademi under the scheme of “Safeguarding of Intangible Cultural Heritage and Diverse Cultural Traditions of India” to study the traditional craftsmanship of the Garos. The first phase of the project (2013–2014) focused on the Garo drums, whereas the second phase (2014–2015) explored the pottery traditions in the Garo Hills. The latter included a two-day workshop, in collaboration with the District Museum, Tura, Meghalaya, for Garo potters to showcase their art to the public after Marak's ethnographic study concluded that the Garo pottery traditions were at-risk of complete eradication without intervention. In the third phase (2015–2016), Marak studied the different types of traditional Garo houses, and their connection to the cultural expressions among tribal Garos.

In 2017, Marak led the team of researchers, along with Gangotri Bhuyan, Milan Meitei and Tengnang D. Sangma, who excavated several finished prehistoric stone tools from Mishimagre village located in the Rongram-Ganol river valley of the West Garo Hills. "The finding of cores (from which stone tools are made) and waste flakes (by-products of tool-making) are indications of a factory site where tools were made in large numbers," she told The Telegraph. Shortly after the discovery, an awareness camp was conducted by North-Eastern Hill University on the importance of conserving prehistoric sites during which Marak spoke to Misimagre villagers about the role of stone tools in the creation of history and the need for adequate research on these tools and sites.

Between 2023 and 2024, Marak was one of the principal advisors for Anthropological Survey of India's region-specific research project studying the impact of digital literacy among the Garos on cultural heritage preservation. She is part of the editorial advisory board for the Indian Journal of Anthropological Research, a refereed, peer-reviewed, bi-annual journal about the traditional and emerging fields of anthropological research.

== Selected publications ==
=== Books ===
- Marak, Queenbala; Chaudhuri, Sarit (2020). The Cultural Heritage of Meghalaya. New Delhi: IGRMS & Manohar. ISBN 9781000071825.
- Marak, Queenbala (2019). Megalithic Traditions of Northeast India. New Delhi: Concept. ISBN 93-86682-70-2, 9789386682703.
- Marak, Queenbala; Bhuyan, Gangotri; Meitei, Milan; Sangma, Tengnang (2017). Misimagre: A Prehistoric factory Site from Garo Hills. New Delhi: Research India Publication. ISBN 978-93-86138-99-6.
- Marak, Queenbala (2016). Doing Autoethnography. New Delhi: Serials Pub. ISBN 978-81-8387-672-8, 8183876722.
- Marak, Queenbala (2014). Food Politics: Studying Food, Identity, and Difference among the Garos. New Castle: CSP. ISBN 978-1-4438-5710-9.

=== Journal articles ===
- Yekha-ü and Marak, Queenbala (2021). "Elicura: The ‘Feasts of Merit’ Shawl of the Chakhesang Naga of Northeast India". The Oriental Anthropologist, 21(1). doi:10.1177/0972558X21990790
- Marak, Queenbala; Ashraf, Abdullah (2018). "Short Axe Typology: A Morphometric Study with Special Reference to Garo Hills Lithics". The Oriental Anthropologist, 18(2). pp. 209–22. doi:10.1177/0976343020180203.
- Marak, Queenbala (2018). "Soul Loss and Retrieval: Understanding the Mi Amua Ritual of the Garos". Journal of Indian Anthropological Society, 53(3). pp. 219–233.

=== Book chapters ===
- Marak, Queenbala (2020). "Pottery Technology in Garo Hills: An Ethnoarchaeological Interpretation". In Sarkar, Surajit; Modwel, Nerupama (eds.). Oral Traditions, Continuities and Transformations in Northeast India and Beyond. Routledge India. ISBN 1-032-16945-1, 9781032169453.
- Marak, Queenbala (2019). "Fleshing the Skeleton: Understanding Prehistoric Cultures in Garo Hills". In Sengupta, Sarthak; Borah, Juri (eds.). Dimensions of Anthropological Research in Northeast India. Delhi: Gyan Publishing. pp. 247–70.
- Marak, Queenbala (2018). "Food and Gender: A Case Study of the Matrilineal Garos". In Pfeffer, Georg; Nath, Nibedita (eds.). Empirical Anthropology: Issues of Academic Friends and Friends in the Field. New Delhi: Concept Publishing. pp. 86–102.
