= Unko Sweater =

- Theatrical release poster
- Directed by: Nabin Chauhan
- Written by: Nabin Chauhan
- Starring: Bipin Karki; Miruna Magar
- Cinematography: Chintan Rajbhandari
- Edited by: Krishna Bhandari
- Music by: Kobid Bazra
- Production company: Artmandu Nepal
- Distributed by: Kafiya Films; Kuber Cine Distribution
- Release date: 9 May 2025
- Running time: 132 minutes
- Country: Nepal
- Language: Nepali
- Budget: est.रू2 crore (US$130,000)
- Box office: est.रू11.41 crore (US$740,000)

Unko Sweater (Nepali: ऊनको स्वीटर, transl. The Woolen Sweater) is a 2025 social drama film written and directed by Nabin Chauhan. Produced by Artmandu Nepal Pvt. Ltd in association with Kendra Motion Pictures, the film stars Bipin Karki and Miruna Magar in lead roles. Based in the multi-cultural settings of Eastern hills of Panchthar, it explores the theme of warmth of love and human connections. This marked the start of film production for Artmandu.

The film released on May 9, 2025 in cinemas among positive response from the audience. It was critically acclaimed for its portrayal of society and lifestyle of eastern hills of Nepal along with the performance of lead actors and debut direction of Nabin Chauhan. It was also a commercial success at the domestic box office.

== Synopsis ==
Set against the backdrop of rural eastern Nepal, the film explores the difficulties of love amidst deep-seated social and traditional boundaries. The story revolves around the relationship between Dharanidhar, an innocent soft-spoken man who is a dutiful member of the traditional Kafle Bahun family, and Phool, a lively and spirited girl from the Gurung community. Their gentle, emerging love is immediately complicated by social realities of casteism, class divides, and the pressure of family lineage that still rigidly govern their society.

Dharanidhar upholds his familial responsibility and tradition, while Phool's strong personality offers a contrast to his reserved nature. Their connection is built through subtle gestures and unspoken emotions, with the titular 'woolen sweater', knitted for a lover, becoming a metaphor for their warmth and silent devotion. The film follows the couple as they struggle to reconcile their personal desires with the expectations of a social system that attempts to keep them apart, ultimately leading to a profound emotional turning point in their journey.

== Cast ==
- Bipin Karki as Dharanidhar Kafle
- Miruna Magar as Phool Gurung
- Parikshya Limbu
- Alex Paras
- Sunil Pokharel
- Maotse Gurung
- Wilson Bikram Rai
- Prem Subba

== Soundtrack ==
Kobid Bazra provided the background score of the film while the music is composed by Sujan Chapagain and Jhuma Limbu. The title song of the film "Phool" was released first on February 14, 2024. Similarly, song titled "Makhamali" was released on December 26, 2024 followed by "Kafle" on April 15 and "Chainejo Jindaganima" on May 11, 2025.

No.	Title	Lyrics	Music	Singer(s)	Length
1.	"Phool"	Hark Saud	Sujan Chapagain	Sujan Chapagain	5:05
2.	"Makhamali"	Hark Saud	Sujan Chapagain	Sujan Chapagain, Sunita Thegim	8:00
3.	"Kafle"	Yubaraj Kafle	Jhuma Limbu	Jhuma Limbu, Sujan Chapagain	3:41
4.	"Chainejo Jindaganima"	Hark Saud	Sujan Chapagain	Sujan Chapagain, Salina BK	4:21
Total length:					21:07

== Box office ==
The film was a superhit at the Nepal box office with a gross of रू11.41 crore, becoming only the 14th film ever in Nepali cinema history to cross रू10 crore landmark.
