= Taksera =

TAKASERA तकसेरा
- Village development committee
- Location in Nepal
- Coordinates: 28.56°N 82.86°E
- Country: Nepal
- Province: Lumbini Province
- District: Eastern Rukum District

Population (2011)
  - Total: 3,698
- Time zone: UTC+5:45 (Nepal Time)
- Area code: +977-88
- Website: www.ddcrukum.gov.np

Takasera was a village development committee in Rukum District but with new political division it is in East Rukum in Lumbini Province of western Nepal. At the time of the 2011 Nepal census it had a population of 3698 people living in 902 individual households. It has altogether 6 clustered villages in different locations within the Takasera VDC and the clustered village names are Taka, Upallo (upper) Sera, Lower (down) Sera, BachiGaun, Ghumlibang, Damchan and Tupa. As per the new federal government system, Takasera has been in the Putha Utterganga Rural Municipality (Ga.Pa.) wards being 10 and 11, in the Rukum Purba (East) district.

The Altitude of Takasera varies from 3,600m at Chauri Buki to 2,200m whereas Taka has the altitude of 2,600m Taksera. Taksera is also a birth place of famous Nepali film youth Director Anil Budha Magar and Actor Dhiraj Magar.
