= Lomba (surname) =

Lomba is a surname. Notable people with the surname include:

- Aldina Matilde Barros da Lomba, Angolan politician
- Amélia da Lomba (born 1961), Angolan writer and journalist
- Anair Lomba (born 1989), Spanish footballer
- Fermín de Sojo y Lomba (1867–1956), Spanish soldier, historian, and writer
- Fermín Lomba (1877–1946), Spanish footballer
- Hermann Lomba (born 1960), French sprinter
- Jimmy Lomba (born 1978), French middle-distance runner
- José Lomba (1868–1951), Spanish professor, researcher, and critic
- Marcelo Lomba (born 1986), Brazilian football goalkeeper
- Marisabel Lomba (born 1974), Belgian judoka and Olympic bronze medalist
- Pedro Lomba Neto (born 2000), Portuguese professional footballer
- Raageshwari Lomba (born 1977), Indian actress and singer
- Rick Lomba (1950–1994), South African documentary filmmaker, environmentalist, and Carte Blanche cameraman
- Sérgio Lomba (born 1973), Mozambican retired professional football player

== See also ==
- Filipe Lombá (born 1959), Portuguese sprinter
