= Anil Budha Magar =

- अनिल बुढा मगर
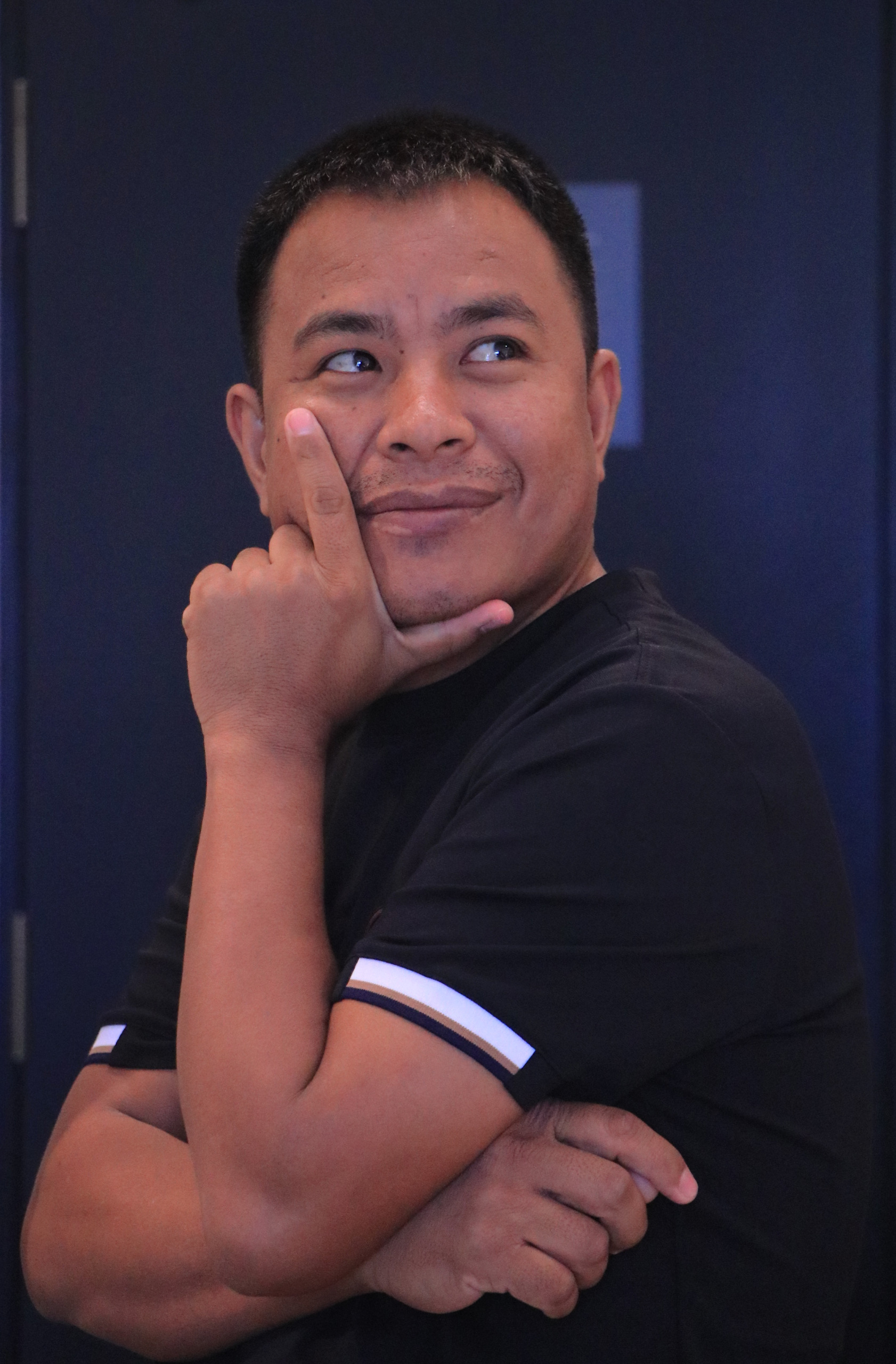
- Born: June 15, 1993 (age 33)
- Citizenship: Nepali
- Occupations: Director; Writer; Journalist
- Years active: 2012–present
- Known for: Lomba
- Notable work: · Aagre (The Iron Digger) (2021) · The Last Shepherd (2023) · Gharjwai (2024)

Anil Budha Magar is an independent Nepali film maker, writer and journalist based Remote Mountain region of the Taksera, Eastern Rukum District, Nepal. His films often explore socio-cultural and political issues in Nepal. He had studied a filmmaking at IFA. He is known for Lomba (The Leadership) (2012), Aagre (The Iron Digger) (2021), The Last Shepherd (2023), Gharjwai (2024), Mitjyu (2026) and Rato Ghera (The red circle (2026).

His short film and documentaries had received many awards at various Film Festivals. But Magar's first commercially directional movie was Gharjwai which was critically acclaimed and commercially successful. According to announcement of the Film Development Board, Nepal Gharjwai was in top 10 highest grossing films of 2081 (Nepali calendar).

== Career ==
Magar's filmmaking career began in 2012 with the short film Lomba (The Leadership), which received critical acclaim, winning five awards and nominations at seven international film festivals.

In 2021, Magar directed the documentary Aagre (The Iron Digger), which gained international recognition, securing nominations in 48 countries and winning 12 awards, including the "Best Documentary in the Nepal Panorama category" of the Kathmandu International Mountain Film Festival (KIMFF) on December 12.

Magar's next film project, the documentary The Last Shepherd (2023), DMZ International Documentary Film Festival was selected for Dhaka DocLab. In 2024, Magar's film Gharjwai, was released.

== Filmography ==
| Year | Movie Title | Director | Producer | Writer | Story | Notes |
|---|---|---|---|---|---|---|
| 2012 | Lomba | ✔ | ✔ | ✔ | ✔ | Fiction Short Film |
| 2021 | Aagre (The Iron Digger) | ✔ | | ✔ | ✔ | Documentary |
| 2023 | The Last Shepherd | ✔ | | ✔ | ✔ | Upcoming |
| 2024 | Gharjwai | ✔ | | ✔ | ✔ | Nepali Fiction Feature Film |
| 2026 | Mitjyoo | ✔ | | | ✔ | Nepali Fiction Feature Film |
