= Gharjwai =

Nepali drama film

- Theatrical release poster
- घरज्वाईं
- Directed by: Anil Budha Magar
- Screenplay by: Anil Budha Magar; Binod Khatiwada; Subash Koirala
- Story by: Anil Budha Magar
- Produced by: Janak Gharti Magar
- Starring: Dayahang Rai; Miruna Magar
- Cinematography: Sushan Prajapati
- Edited by: Krishna Bhandari
- Music by: Kobid Bazra
- Production company: GM Movies Production
- Distributed by: RR Films
- Release date: 12 July 2024
- Country: Nepal
- Box office: रू5.09 crore

Gharjwai (Nepali: घरज्वाईं) is a 2024 Nepali social drama film directed by Anil Budha Magar. Magar alongside Binod Khatiwada and Subash Koirala wrote the screenplay for the film. It's produced by Janak Gharti Magar under the banner of GM Movies Production. The film stars Dayahang Rai and Miruna Magar in lead roles with Shishir Bangdel, Raj Thapa Magar, Kabita Ale Magar and Buddhi Tamang in supporting roles.

Extensively shot in Eastern Rukum, the film explores the conflict between modern aspirations, individual choice, and deep-seated cultural traditions within a changing rural Magar community in Western Nepal. The central plot of the film is based on the story of youths, who were displaced due to the decade long Nepalese Civil War culminating into 2006 Nepalese revolution, start returning to their villages. However, being detached to their society and culture for a long time found themselves divided between their roots and modernity. The film released on July 12, 2024 in cinemas among positive reviews.

== Synopsis ==
The story revolves around Soro, a young Magar man who returns to his village in Rukum as a school teacher following the conclusion of People's movement. He falls deeply in love with a local girl, Binjuri. Their path to marriage, however, is complicated by Binjuri's father, who is determined to uphold a unique family and community tradition: his future son-in-law must agree to become a 'Gharjwai', a resident son-in-law who lives at bride's home.

This tradition creates a dilemma for Soro, who is his parents' only son and is therefore bound by a separate familial responsibility to care for them and maintain his own patrilineal household.

As Soro struggles to reconcile his love for Binjuri with his duty to his own family, Binjuri's father subjects him to a series of challenging and often unconventional tasks and trials. The film thus becomes a test of Soro's skills, commitment, and determination to prove he is worthy of being a 'Gharjwai', even as it examines the societal expectations and shifting gender roles in a community on the brink of cultural transition.

== Cast ==
- Dayahang Rai as Soro
- Miruna Magar as Binjuri
- Buddhi Tamang
- Shishir Bangdel
- Raj Thapa Magar
- Kabita Ale Magar
- Pushkar Gurung
- Khadka Bahadur Pun Magar
- Suresh Pun
- Anu Thapa
- Sunil Magar
- Bhola Raj Sapkota

== Soundtrack ==
Kobid Bazra provided the background score for the film while its music was composed by Manoj Thapa Magar and SD Yogi. The first song titled Binjuri was released on June 21 followed by the song titled Yanimaya on July 6, 2024.

No.	Title	Lyrics	Music	Singer	Length
1.	"Binjuri"	Ram Abiral Bista	SD Yogi	SD Yogi	4:47
2.	"Yanimaya"	Hark Saud	Manoj Thapa Magar	Manoj Thapa Magar	6:05
Total length:					10:52

== Box office ==
Gharjwai grossed रू1.51 crore in its first two days among positive response. The film enjoyed good run at the box office earning रू4.63 crore at the end of two weeks. At the end of its run, it grossed रू5.09 crore in Nepal.
