= Nango Gau =

2023 Nepalese film

- Nepali: नाङ्गो गाउँ
- Directed by: Dipendra Lama
- Written by: Dipendra Lama
- Starring: Dayahang Rai; Miruna Magar; Samragyee RL Shah
- Cinematography: Aalok Shukla
- Edited by: Banish Shah
- Music by: SD Yogi; Dipak Sharma
- Production company: Clock Work Creation
- Distributed by: RR Films
- Release date: 15 September 2023 (Nepal)
- Country: Nepal
- Language: Nepali
- Budget: रू1.50 crore (equivalent to ₹0.00 or US$0.00 in 2026)
- Box office: रू4.10 crore (equivalent to ₹0.00 or US$0.00 in 2026)

Nango Gau (Nepali:नाङ्गो गाउँ) is a 2023 Nepali film written and directed by Dipendra Lama. It was produced by Jaya Shrestha. Released on September 15, 2023, the film stars Dayahang Rai, Miruna Magar, Karma, Samragyee RL Shah, Buddhi Tamang and more.

== Cast ==
- Dayahang Rai
- Miruna Magar
- Samragyee RL Shah
- Buddhi Tamang
- Ankeet khadka

== Release ==
The film was released on September 15, 2023, all over Nepal. It was presented as "a movie that captures the essence of rural Nepal in its purest form" and "social drama movie based on local political issues of Nepal."
