= Chyabrung =

Traditional Unpitched percussion instrument of Limbu people

Chyabrung च्याब्रुङ (Nepali)
- A man playing Chyabrung at Dharan (Limbuwan), Nepal

Percussion instrument
- Classification: Membranophones
- Inventor: Limbu people

The Chyabrung also Kay/Ke in Limbu language is a traditional drum of the Limbu community in Nepal, Sikkim, Darjeeling hills and Northeast India.The Chyabrung is a hollow, oblong, wooden drum about two meters in diameter and two feet in length. The drum is strung around the player's neck with a cord at stomach height and played during auspicious festivals Chasok Tangnam of the Limbu community.

== Construction ==
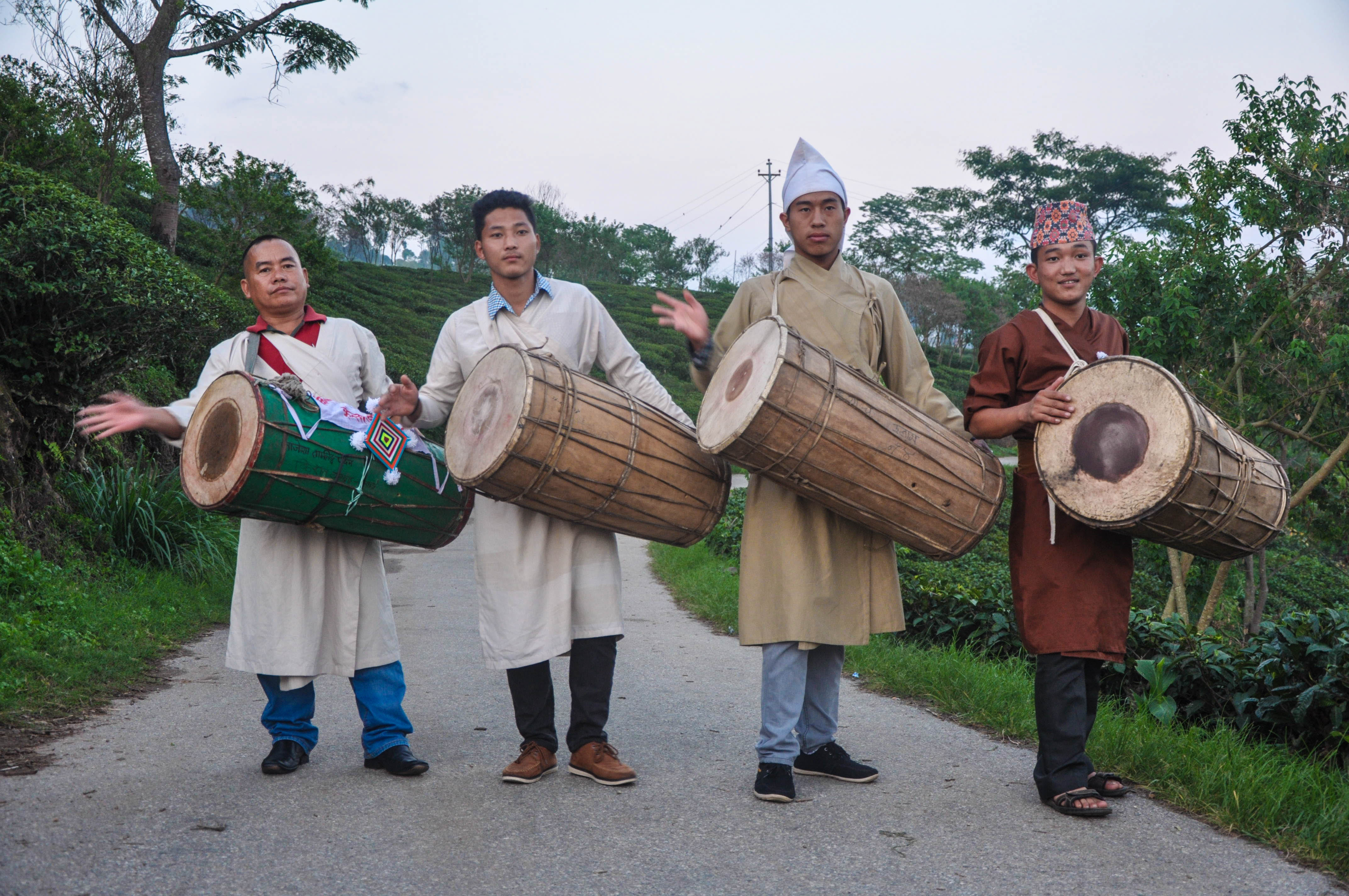
Young men playing the traditional Chyabrung. Ilam, Nepal

The Chyabrung has two openings on either end, each end being tightly stretched by cow and bull skin: on the right and left ends respectively. The face covered by cow skin produces a sharp treble tone whilst the face covered by bull/buffalo skin produces a flat bass sound.

The cow skin face is called huksagay and is played with the palm of the hand the bull side is called singsagay and played with a stick called kay chhari.

== Chyabrung dance ==
The Limbus whilst playing the Chyabrung perform the Chyabrung dance during the festivals of Chasok Tangnam and Yalakma (Dhan Naach or rice harvest dance). The only music to the dance is the rhythmic beating of the Chyabrung and dancers execute synchronized and complicated foot work depicting graceful movements of wild animals and birds.

== See also ==
- Maadal
- Dhimay
- Music of Nepal
