= Miruna Magar =

Nepalese film actress

Miruna Lisara Magar
- मिरुना लीसारा मगर
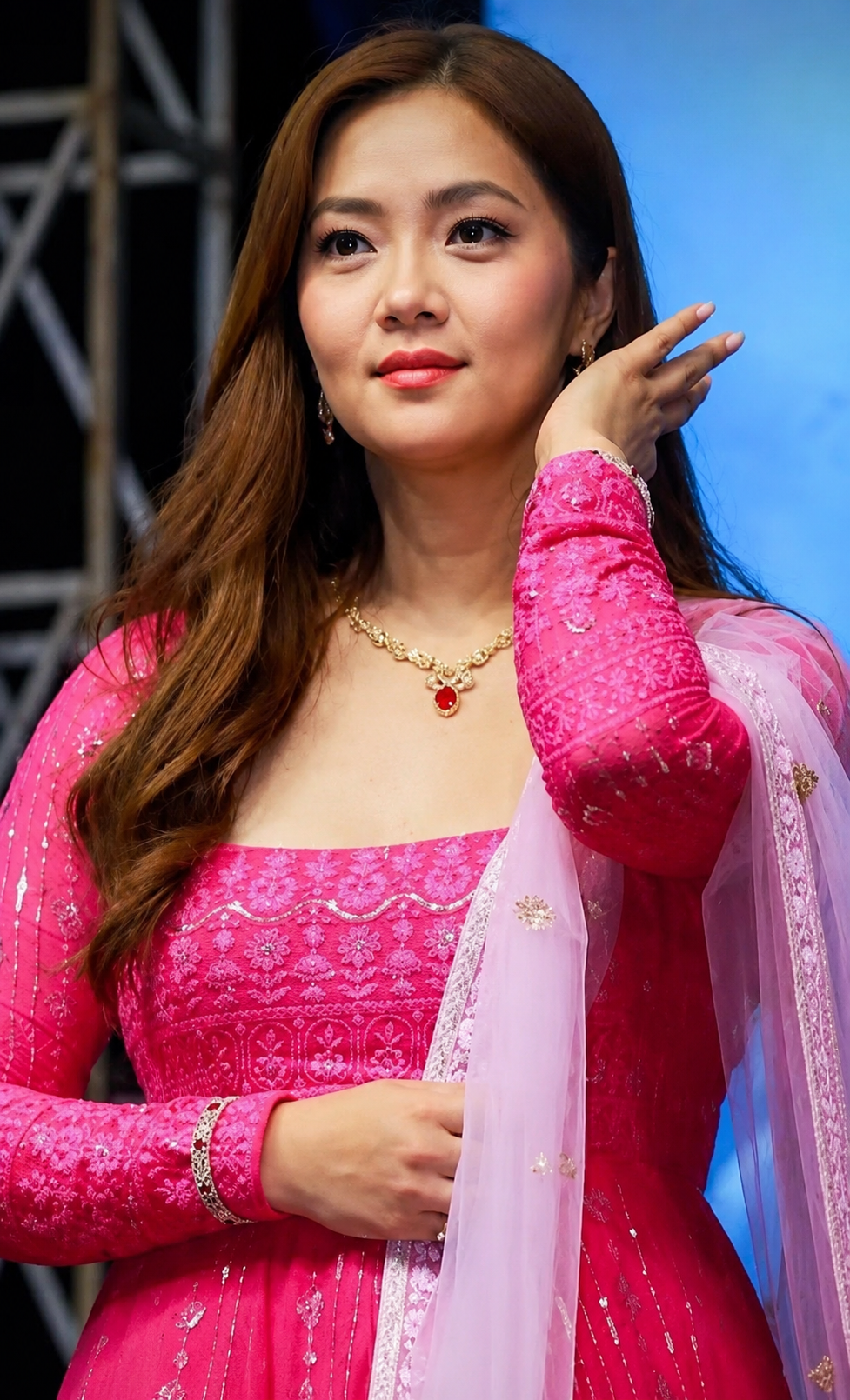
- Magar in 2025
- Born: July 18, 1994 (age 32); Hong Kong
- Occupations: Actress; Model
- Years active: 2018–present
- Known for: Kabaddi 4: The Final Match (2022), Jaari (2023), Unko Sweater (2025)
- Honours: National Film Award (2082)

Miruna Lisara Magar (Note: Nepali: मिरुना लीसारा मगर; Nepali pronunciation: [miɾuna lisaɾa mʌgʌɾ]) (born 18 July 1994) is a Nepalese actress. She is one of the highest-paid actresses in Nepali cinema. Known for pioneering a change in the portrayal of women in Nepali cinema, she is the recipient of several awards, including a National Film Award.

She made her film debut in 2018 with Lalpurja. She further starred in a lead role in the film Kabaddi 4: The Final Match (2022), which became the highest-grossing Nepali film of all time. Later she starred in the 2023 film Jaari (2023), which also became one of the highest-grossing Nepali films. In the following decade, she earned critical acclaim for her performances in the films Nango Gau (2023), Rangeli (2024), Mansarra (2024), Gharjwai (2024), Unko Sweater (2025), Jaari 2 (2025). Apart from her acting career, Magar has worked as a judge in various of shows. She is also a popular celebrity endorser for various brands and products, has participated in stage shows, and is active in humanitarian work.

== Personal life ==
Miruna Magar was born in Hong Kong; her family returned to Nepal when she was two years old. Her family originally belonged to Dharan, and she lived her early years there until she was twelve. Her father served in the British Army's Royal Gurkha Rifles. She migrated to London with her family when she was twelve and completed her schooling there. She came back to Nepal in 2016, where she got the opportunity to learn acting.

== Career ==
Magar had her first role in the 2018 film Lalpurja; she also starred in Rose in the same year. In 2019, she starred in Saino and Cha Cha Hui, which mostly received negative reviews from the critics, although her performance was praised. She then starred in the record-breaking Kabaddi 4: The Final Match in 2022, which became the highest-grossing Nepali film of all time, collecting over 22.73 crore.

In 2022, while Magar was in promotion of her film Kabaddi 4: The Final Match, there was an incident where she claimed a monk touched her inappropriately, and she slapped him in public and humiliated him for the misbehavior. She filed a lawsuit against him, which she later dropped. They both apologised to each other. Some people called it a publicity stunt; they even protested and wanted to ban the film. Consequently, it was banned in the Indian state of Sikkim. Later, when the incident started to get worse, she reached an agreement with the monk and apologized to the entire Buddhist community for the negative impact of the incident.

In 2023, she starred in Jaari, which earned 13 crore in the first two weeks of its release and became one of the highest-grossing Nepali films.

Magar was chosen as a brand ambassador of 12th Nepal European Union Film Festival which took place between April 28 to April 30, 2023.

== Filmography ==
Key
†	Denotes films that have not yet been released

Year	Film	Role	Notes	Ref(s)
2018	Lalpurja	Parpala	Debut film	
2018	Rose	Sneha		
2019	Saino	Anu		
2019	Cha Cha Hui	Sangeeta		
2022	Kabaddi 4: The Final Match	Shanti		
2023	Jaari	Hangma		
2023	Nango Gau	Nima		
2024	Rangeli	Junkiri		
2024	Mansarra	Mansara		
2024	Gharjwai	Binjuri		
2025	Unko Sweater	Phool Gurung		
2025	Janai Harayeko Manchhe			
2025	Maijharo			
2025	Jaari 2	Hangma		
2026	Kabaddi 5: After the Final Match	Shanti		
