= Sukra Raj Sonyok (Songyokpa) =

Nepali politician

Sukra Raj Sonyok Limbu (Nepali: शुक्रराज संयोक लिम्बु; 22 December 1936 – 2 February 2026) was a Nepalese politician and former Member of Parliament in Nepal. He was born to a Limbu (Songyokpa) family in Taplejung, Eastern Nepal. He served as a Member of National Assembly from 1997 to 2004. During his term in parliament, he served as the Chief Whip of Nepali Congress (Democratic) from 2003 to 2004.

== Political Career and Military Service ==
Limbu ran for the House of Representatives of Nepal in 1991 from Taplejung Constituency - 2 on behalf of the Nepali Congress. He also contested to be Member of the Constituent Assembly in 2010 from Morang Constituency - 2. He played an active role in the armed uprising of 1974 (2031 B.S.) as a local commander of the Congress Mukti Sena (Liberation Army) of the Nepali Congress.

Before entering Nepalese politics, he served in the British Gurkha Army (1954–1970). He held the rank of Sergeant (Service No: 21140931) in the Queen's Gurkha Engineers Unit.

== Death ==
Limbu died on 2 February 2026, at the Kathmandu Medical College Hospital in Kathmandu. He was 89 years old.

== See also ==
- National Assembly of Nepal
- Elections in Nepal
- Limbu people
- Limbuwan
- Brigade of Gurkhas
