= Lomba (film) =

Lomba (The Leadership) is a Nepali feature film in Magar language written and directed by Anil Budha

Magar. The film depicts the journey about the transportation of a herd of sheep from one place to another in the Himalayan region. Lead actors in Lomba include Janak Budhamagar, Maitya Gharti Magar, Dhana Rupi Budhamagar, Tira Budhamagar, Shambu Pun Magar, Ram Bini Budhamagar, and Surat Pun Magar.

The film portrays the struggle of shepherds after the death of a ‘Lomba’, and their efforts to train another sheep to take the new identity as the leader of the herd. Whenever the shepherd as to transport the herd of sheep from one place to another, they have to appoint a ‘leader’ sheep, which the rest of the herd follow. “Set in the Himalayas, Lomba tells the story of the selection of a next sheep ‘leader’ following the demise of an erstwhile ‘Lomba’. Selecting a Lomba and training it often happens to be a gruelling task for shepherds. Which gives the film its main conflict,” director Magar said in one of his interviews to Kathmandu Post.

In the Nepali Indigenous Film Festival held from 25 to 27 August 2017, in New York, US, Lomba got nominated in six categories; among them, it won awards in three categories - Best Film, Best Director and Best Costume awards."Lomba" was also nominated for 15th Kathmandu International Mountain Film Festival (KIMFF) 2017. and 3rd Pokhara International Mountain Film Festival (PIMFF) 2017.
