= Phalgunanda =

Kirat religious leader

राष्ट्रिय विभूति (National Hero) Mahaguru Phalgunanda Lingden
- महागुरू फाल्गुनन्द लिङ्देन
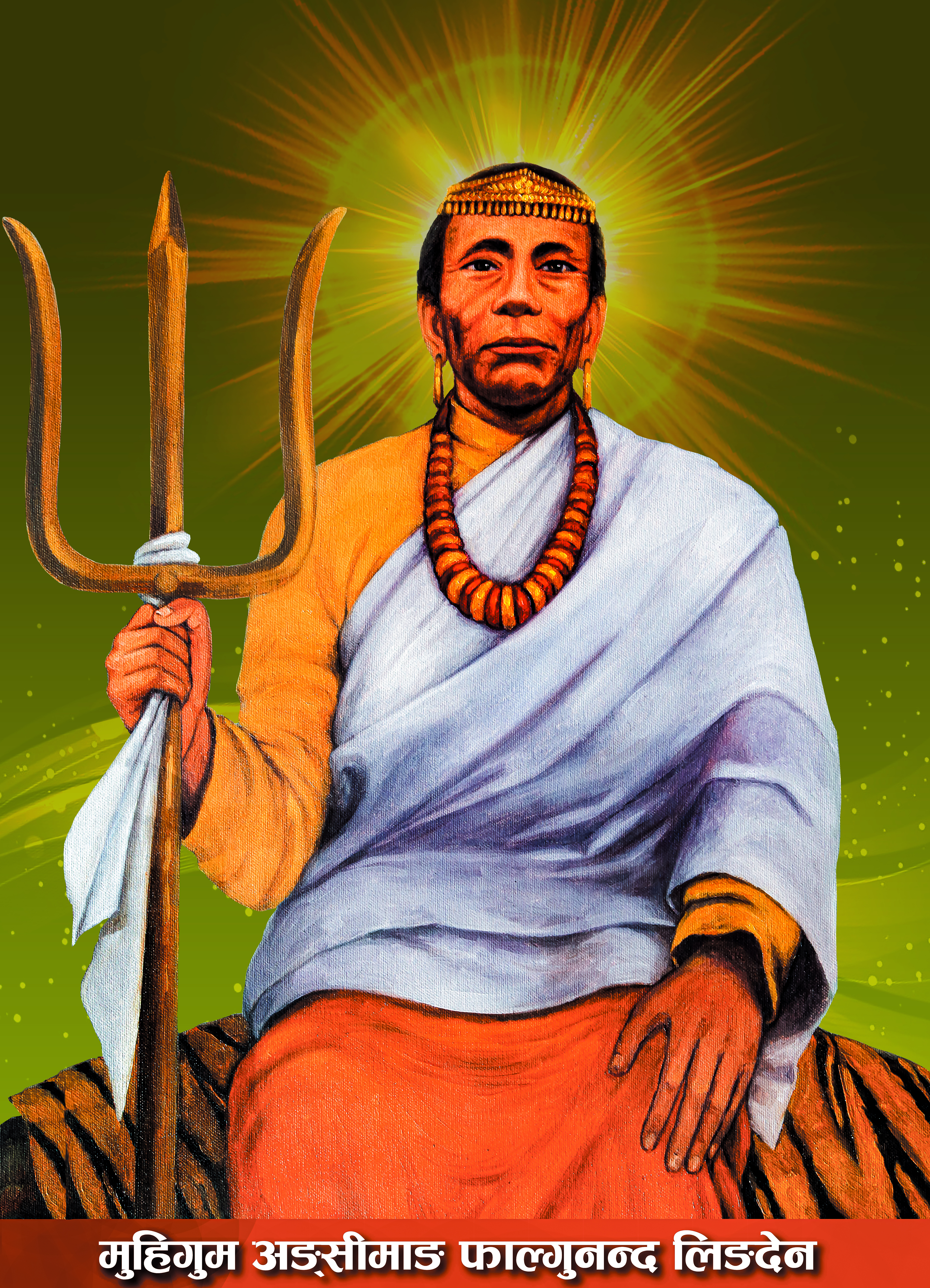
- Born: Phalgu Nath Ananda; 10 November 1885; Ibhang, Dandagaun, Ilam
- Died: 4 April 1949; Imbung (Panchthar)
- Occupations: Cleric and scholar
- Known for: Socio-religious reforms
- Parent(s): Jaganbaj Lingden & Hangsamati Lingden

Mahaguru Phalgunanda (Nepali: महागुरु फाल्गुनन्द; 10 November 1885 – 4 April 1949) also known as Phalgunanda Lingden was a leader of the Kirat religion for the Kirat people of Nepal.

== Early life and background ==
Mahaguru Phalgunanda Lingden was born as Phalgu Nath Ananda on 10 November 1885 (25 Kartik 1942 B.S.) in the village of Chukchinamba Ilam district of Nepal. His parents were Jaganbaj Lingden and Hangsamati Lingden. In his young age, he served as a Nepali Gurkha soldier in the British Indian Army and fought in World War I. He spent approximately a decade in British India. After his military service, he became a spiritual leader.

== Career ==
He was known as Mahaguru (the great teacher), especially among the Limbu, Rai, Sunuwar, Yakhkha, Lohorung, Dhimal, and Jurel Kirat people. He is credited with the continuation of the ancient Kirat religion on puritan principles, which include vegetarianism, a ban on alcohol, and following Limbu traditions and scripts. He is remembered for his socio-cultural and religious messages. His main messages included calling for a ban on animal sacrifice, since it raised social expenditures on celebrations such as births, weddings, and funerals.

== Beliefs and national recognition ==
He believed that education brought knowledge to wash one's heart clean, which he considered the only key to emancipation. For Falgunanda, emancipation is the ultimate truth for realizing God. His philosophy emphasizes love and non-violence. He built many shrines. He died in 1949.

In 2009, in recognition of his enduring impact, the Shree Pach ko Sarkar (then Nepal Government) had declared him as a National luminary placing him alongside eminent figures in Nepali history. He is Nepal's 16th luminary of Nepal.

In 1993, The Nepal Postal Services Department issued a postal stamp in his honor as part of its "Distinguished Personalities Series".

== Legacy ==
Phalgunanda Jayanti is celebrated widely especially in the eastern parts of Nepal and Kathmandu through an event honoring his birth anniversary. It is generally celebrated on 25th Kartik in the Nepali lunar calendar.
