= Fermín de Sojo y Lomba =

Spanish soldier and historian

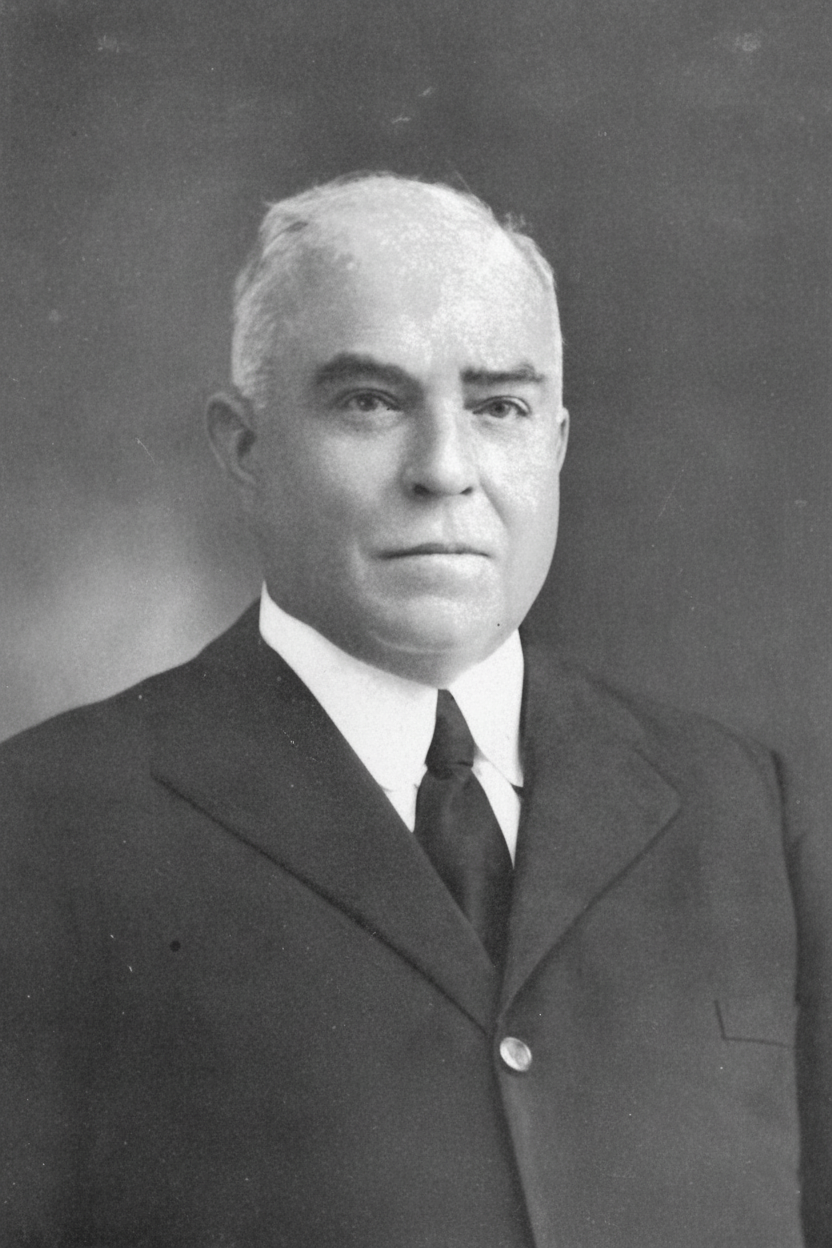
- Born: Fermín de Sojo y Lomba; 8 February 1867; Havana, Cuba
- Died: 14 November 1956 (aged 89); Santander, Spain
- Occupations: Soldier; Historian
- Known for: Captain General of Catalonia

1st president Centro de Estudios Montañeses
- In office 1934–1940

Fermín de Sojo y Lomba (8 February 1867 – 14 November 1956) was a Spanish soldier, historian, and writer.

== Early life and education ==
Lomba was born on 8 February 1867 in Havana, Cuba, when the country was under the sovereignty of the Spanish Empire, as the son of José María Sojo y Ruiz-Vallejo, of Biscay origin, and Leandra Lomba de los Cuetos, a native of Liérganes (Cantabria). When his family returned to Spain in 1874, he began his first studies in Liérganes (Cantabria). In 1877 he moved to Valladolid to study Mathematics, also becoming interested in literature.

Lomba entered the Academy of Engineers of Guadalajara on 1 September 1883, leaving as a lieutenant of the Corps after finishing the regulatory studies, and with the number two of his class, on 17 July 1888.

== Military career ==
His first destination was the Mixed Regiment of Engineers of Logroño, and three years later he was in the Plaza de Santander directing the construction work of the María Cristina barracks. After visiting various destinations he arrived in Santander where he witnessed the explosion of the steamship Cabo Machichaco and the misfortune that devastated the city. He then collaborated in the work after that explosion and was promoted to captain of Engineers in May 1896, thus being discharged from his regiment, moving to the Railway Battalion with a new assignment.

In September 1896, Lomba went to Cuba, commanding a Company of Railway Sappers, where he actively participated in the last years of the Cuban War of Independence. Commanding his company, he carried out numerous fortification works (especially on the trail or fortified line from Júcaro to Morón, which divided the island into two areas), in the repair and maintenance of the railway lines in Cuba, and, finally, in the painful construction of piers on the unhealthy banks of the Cauto River and in the work necessary to maintain river navigation on said river, where fever decimated the Spaniards. Later, he served as aide-de-camp to General of Engineers D. Ramiro de Bruna.

When he returned to the Peninsula, he fell ill, and in 1902, once he was restored and incorporated into service, he was assigned to the fortification work in the Pyrenees, in the La Seu d'Urgell area. During the years 1903 to 1904, he was in a replacement situation in Madrid, a situation that he took advantage of to consult the National Library, the Royal Academy of History, and the Museums of Engineers and Artillery, in order to fully dedicate himself to historical research.

Lomba was a professor at the Academy of Engineers of Guadalajara (1904–1910), where he taught several subjects such as Military Applications of Bridges, Telegraphs, and Mines, and also Art, History, and military geography. During his time as a teacher, in June 1905, he took part in the practices of the Aerostation company, making several captive ascensions and one free ascension in the Mercury balloon, traveling nearly 45 kilometers and reaching a maximum height of 1,640 meters above sea level.

Lomba was promoted to Commander of Engineers in March 1910, in September of that same year he went to provide his services to the Engineer Command of Gran Canaria, from where he would successively pass through those of La Coruña and Cartagena. He was promoted to lieutenant colonel in September 1917, and took over command of a battalion of the 2nd Regiment of Sappers-Miners in 1919. He was then promoted to colonel of Engineers in July 1922, and on several occasions he would temporarily command the General Command of the Eighth Region, later going on to provide his services in the staff of the Major Central Army. In June and July 1924, Lomba made the study trip abroad ordered by Royal Order, and the following September he attended the special course for colonel of the Combatant Arms close to promotion, and since December 1925 in the General Directorate of Campaign Preparation of the Ministry of War. Later he was again in the La Coruña Command, in the Central General Staff of the Army and, finally, as a member of the Optional Board of the Corps of Engineers.

Lomba also held different and important service commissions, including those of a member of the Optional Board of his Corps and the one designated to assess the cost of war material for various units, artillery of naval bases and regional training camps; that of substitute member of the Superior Council of Railways; representative of the War branch in the International Commission of the Trans-Pyrenean Railways, and was part of the commission designated to evaluate the works of the Penitentiary Colony of Dueso (Santoña). He was promoted to brigadier general in March 1927, and was assigned as head of the Section of the Royal Corps of Engineers, in the Ministry of War. In 1931 he went to the reserve, dedicating himself fully to historical research.

== Historian career ==
In 1936, when the Spanish Civil War began, Lomba was imprisoned in Madrid despite being seventy years old. After the war, he collaborated in various military magazines, also publishing works in numerous fields, especially in history. He was a member and first president of the Centro de Estudios Montañeses, a position that he held for six years between 1934 and 1940.

Lomba began his writing career which he expanded when he returned to Cantabria in 1912, especially collecting documentation for his historical works on Trasmiera. As an example of his research work, associating toponymy of Latin origin with the Roman era, he established up to nine Roman roads in Cantabrian territory (via Agripa or de la Costa, road from the Mena valley to Castro Urdiales, Los Tornos road, the Portillo de La Sía road, the Portillo de Lunada road, the Escudo road, the Besaya road, the entrance through Piedras Luengas and the road parallel to Agripa), in addition to pointing out other secondary roads and various connecting branches between all of them.

Lomba collected a significant amount of ancient books (16th-19th centuries), which he donated to the library of the Academy of Army Engineers of Guadalajara, currently in the town of Hoyo de Manzanares in Madrid. He was also an active contributor to the Army Engineers Memorial magazine, in which he published numerous articles.

== Works ==
Some of his most important published works were: Military and Land Mines, two volumes published in 1908 and 1909, which were declared a textbook at the Academy of Engineers, and Captain Luis Piñazo (1926), a work in which he gave meet one of the great artillerymen and engineers of the 16th century, who until the time of publication was totally unknown. After his death, his work El marshal Mazarrasa (Santander, 1972) and El brigadier don Ignacio Alonso de Cuevillas, published in the Altamira magazine of the Center for Montañeses, were published.

== Decorations and tributes ==
In the Cuban campaign, he achieved the following rewards: two first-class Red Crosses of Military Merit, one of them pensioned, for the work carried out and weapons actions fought on the trail from Júcaro to Morón, until 31 December 1896 and end of May of the following year; First class cross from María Cristina for the services provided on the Júcaro to San Fernando trail from June to the end of September 1897; two first class red crosses of Military Merit, one of them pensioned, for the operations carried out for the opening and rehabilitation of the Cauto River, from 10 December 1897 to the following January 23, and for the services and work carried out to the defense of the Plaza de la Habana, from 22 April to 31 August 1898, and the Medal of Cuba with a pin. She was also in possession of the following decorations: three first-class white Crosses of Military Merit, one of them with the Faculty pin; Second class white cross of Military Merit, retired; Cross and Plaque of San Hermenegildo; commemorative medals of the catastrophe that occurred in Santander due to the explosion of the Cabo Machichaco steamship ; Alfonso XIII Medal; of the Sites of Zaragoza and Gerona; battles of Puente Sampayo and Brihuega and Villaviciosa and the Tribute to SS. MM.

== Death ==
Lomba died on 14 November 1956, at the age of 73.
