= Chasok Tangnam =

Worship, offering the newly grown crops to deities

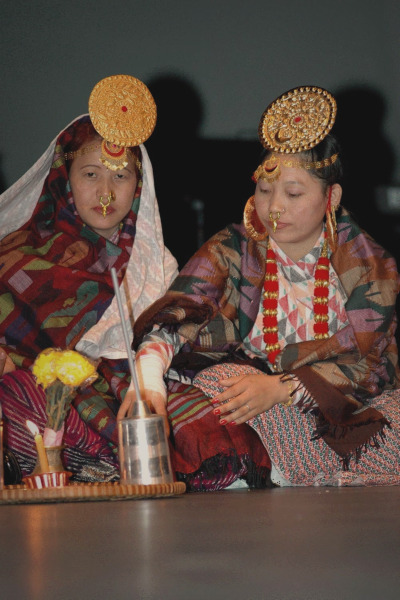
- Limbu women with traditional clothing and traditional tongba drink.
- Observed by: Limbu people
- Observances: Prayers and religious rituals
- Date: November–December lunar calendar
- Frequency: Annual

Chasok Tangnam is a festival of the Limbu people which falls on a full moon day of the month of Senchengla or the Mangsir month of the Nepali calendar. The festival is marked with the first harvest being offered to God Yuma Sammang and other deities and exchanging cordiality with each other.
