= Bishnu Maden =

Nepali politician

Personal details
- Party: Rashtriya Prajatantra Party

Bishnu Maden (1939/40 – July 10, 2003) was a Nepalese politician. He served as Minister of Law and Forest during the Panchayat era.

After the democratic opening, Maden joined the Rashtriya Prajatantra Party. He became a Central Committee member of the party. When RPP was divided, he stayed with party leader Surya Bahadur Thapa.

He contested the Pratinidhi Sabha elections in 1994 and 1999 in the Taplejung-2 constituency on behalf of the RPP. Both times he came in second place.

Bishnu Maden died at age 63 years old.
