= Iman Xin Chemjong =

Nepalese academic

Iman Singh Chemjong Limbu
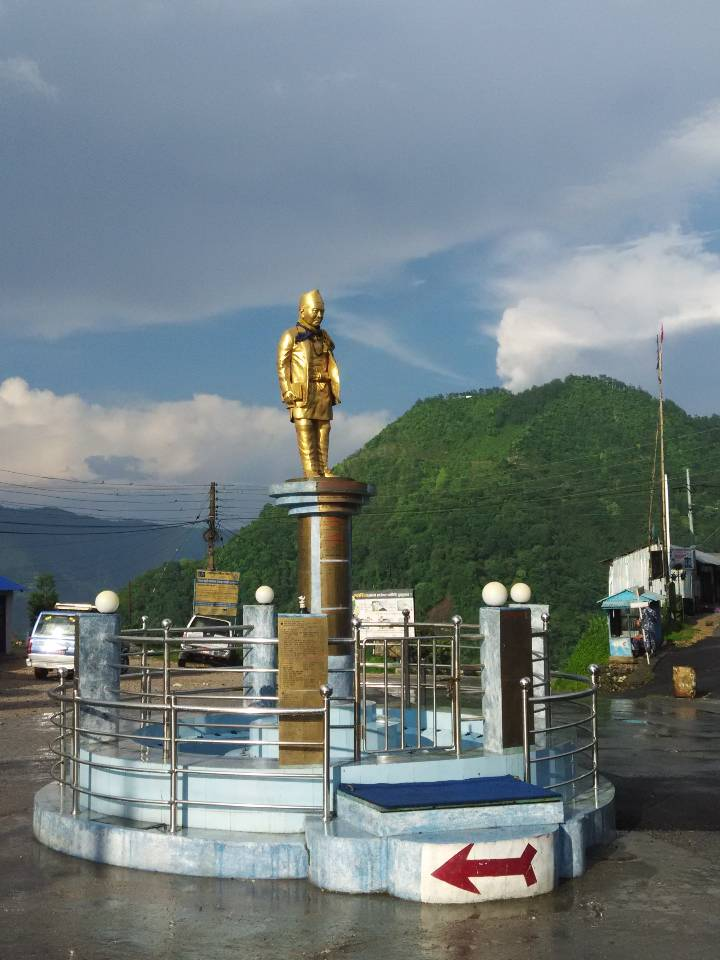
- इमान सिंह चेम्जोङ लिम्बू ᤀᤡᤔᤠᤏ ᤛᤡᤲᤜ ᤆᤣᤶᤈᤥᤅ ᤗᤡᤶᤒᤢ Statue of Iman singh Chemjong at Bhedetar
- Born: 1 January 1904; Darjeeling, India
- Died: 1975 (aged 70–71); Kathmandu, Nepal
- Education: St. Xavier's College, Kolkata
- Occupations: historian, writer, linguist, lexicographer
- Spouse: Amiran Chemjong
- Children: 5 (Nurja Chemjong Kunwar, Nora Chemjong Smith, Sukh Hangma Chemjong Greene, Deputy Inspector General (Retired) of Nepal Police Hang Singh Chemjong and Brigadier General (Retired) of Nepal Army Mohan Singh Chemjong.
- Parents: Megbar Singh Chemjong (father); Devapu Hangma (mother)

Iman Singh Chemjong Limbu; was a Limbu historian, writer, linguist, lexicographer, folklorist, and philosopher of Nepal. Chemjong devoted his entire life to studying and documenting various facets of Kirat Limbu tradition and culture at a time when such activities were frowned upon and even punished by the Nepalese ruling elite as being subversive and "anti-national". Chemjong's research into and publication of Kirant history and culture challenged perceptions of the Nepalese official doctrine that showcased Nepal as a Hindu cultural monolith devoid of alternative narratives.

== Education ==
Chemjong received his education at St. Xavier's College, Kolkata, then under the University of Calcutta. In 1928, he completed his certificate level and was about to enroll for a Bachelor degree, when his father, Megbar Singh Chemjong, died. Chemjong junior had to put his academic aspirations on hold.

== Early influences ==
Traditionally, Limbus observed a religion called Mundhum centred on animistic rituals and practices. However, due to assimilation of Limbus into the Hindu mainstream, many Limbus adopted Hindu names and started to participate in Hindu worships and festivals.

Limbus never really severed their ties to their rich religion and culture that stretched back to ancient times. Alongside Hindu goddesses Durga and Laxmi, Limbus continued to worship their own supreme god Ningmaphuma. One such devoted Limbu worshipper was Chemjong's own mother, Devapu Hangma. Limbu Mundum religion is a rich cornucopia of oral traditions encompassing Kirati theology, mythology, history, genealogy, culture and traditions, and having a devout mother gave Chemjong a distinct advantage to learn all these.

A turning point in Chemjong's life came in 1925, when the legendary Limbu activist Lalshore Sendang visited Kalimpong in Darjeeling district and met Limbu elders and activists. Chemjong was one of the many Limbu youths who learned the Limbu Sirijonga script from Sendang and attended his talks on Limbu religion and culture.

== Works ==
Chemjong researched Limbu language and culture in Limbuwan, i.e. East Nepal, the neighbouring hill areas of Darjeeling and Sikkim (then an independent Himalayan kingdom) and also in Assam. In his own lifetime, he published the following works:

- Kirat Itihas (1948)
- Kirat Sahityako Itihas (1955)
- Kirat Folklore (1961)
- Kirat Mundhum (1961)
- Limboo-Nepali-English Dictionary (1961)
- Kirat Mundhum Khahun (1965)
- Kirat History and Culture (1967)
- Kirat Darshanko Saransh (1969)
- Lepcha-Nepali-English Dictionary (1969)
- Bijayapurko Itihas (1974)

== Middle name ==
Although some say that his middle name Xin was spelled as Singh due to mainstream Nepalese or Indian influence, others say Singh is correct because in his book Kiratakalina Vijayapurako Sankshipta Itihasa, Chemjong writes his name in Nepali as Iman Singh Chemjong.

== Recognition ==
In a gesture that went against the grain of prevailing state ideology, King Mahendra invited Chemjong to join Nepal's Tribhuvan University in the capacity of "Limbu expert" in 1961. For years until his death, Chemjong headed a one-man Limbu research team at then Nepal's only university.In the 1950s and 60s, Iman Singh Chemjong was a name that resonated with respect and admiration. As a scholar from Darjeeling, his erudition and dedication to the cultural upliftment of Nepal were unparalleled. King Mahendra of Nepal, recognizing his potential, invited Chemjong to aid in the construction of a cohesive Nepali nationalism. The king's vision was to foster a sense of unity and cultural pride among the diverse ethnic groups within the kingdom, and Chemjong seemed the ideal candidate to spearhead this intellectual and cultural renaissance. Today, the Limbu community spread across mid and eastern Nepal, West Bengal, Assam, Sikkim and Bhutan revere Chemjong as a hero for almost single-handedly researching and documenting various aspects of Limbu and Kirati life at a time when these sorts of activities were neither encouraged nor fashionable. Various functions are held each year to commemorate Chemjong's contributions.
