= Desh Subba =

Nepali writer

- Born: Desh Bahadur Limbu; 6 December 1965 (age 60); Dharan, Nepal

Desh Subba (born 6 December 1965) is a Nepal-born author and poet.

His book Philosophy of Fearism published through the self-publishing US service Xlibris. It portrays fear as major part of life. According to him life is conducted, guided and controlled by fear. He also writes about the utility of fear, impact of fear, dephilosophy of philosophy etc.

Born in Dharan, Eastern Nepal, Subba lives with his family in Hong Kong.

Fathers' Name: Kubir Jung Limbu Mother's Name: Tilmati Limbu Education: Master in business administration Writing field: Philosophy of Fearism Published Novel Books: Four novels, Doshi Karm 2050 B.S, Apman 2052 B.S., Sahid 2056 B.S., Aadibashi 2064 B.S.

He started fearism as a literary movement in 1999 with fiction and in 2011 with line poetry. He's published four novels in Nepali. His third novel, Aadibashi, is recently published in English, titled Journey to Fearless. In this novel he experiments with fearism in literature. He has received four book awards in 2015: International Nepali Literature Society's (Washington, DC) Dr. Shyam Karki/Indira Karki Diaspora Best Analytical Book of the Year Award 2014–15 for Bhayabad (Philosophy of Fearism), National Indie Excellence Awards (winner), International Book Awards (finalist) and New York Book Festival Award (honorable mention) and 2015 Southern California Book Festival Awards (honorable mention). He continues to write while speaking at universities, like Hong Kong University and elsewhere about fearism. He is the leading fearism spokesperson in the East, and co-founder of the Fearism Study Center (2009–) in Dharan, Nepal.

Involved in organization: Hong Kong Nepalese Literary Academy.

== Awards ==
- Winner, National Indie Excellence Award, 2015
- Finalist, International Book Award, 2015
- Honorable Mention, Southern California Book Festival, 2015
- Winner, Dr. Shyam Karki and Indira Karki Award, 2015
- Honorable Mention, New York Book Festival Award, 2015
- Award from Dhaka University, 2016

== Bibliography ==
- Philosophy of Fearism (2014)
- Philosophy of Fearism: a First East-West dialogue with Michael Fisher (2016)
- Tribesmen's Journey to Fearless
- Fear, Law and Criminology Critical Issues in applying the Philosophy of Fearism with Michael Fisher and Maria Kumar

== Sources ==
- "Fear is the driver of human progress, Hong Kong author argues". South China Morning Post. 25 March 2015.
- http://www.themileage.org/2015/02/philosophy-of-fearism.html
- "International Book Awards – Honoring Excellence in Independent & Mainstream Publishing". internationalbookawards.com. Archived from the original on 29 December 2015.
- "Indie Excellence® Awards 2015 Winners". indieexcellence.com. Archived from the original on 10 September 2015.
- "कान्तिपुर समाचार :: देशलाई तीन अमेरिकी अवार्ड". Kantipur.
- "HKUL AV Philosophy of fearism". University of Hong Kong.
- "Philosophy of Fearism" (Press release). blueinkreview.com.
- "HKNEPALIRADIO.com". hknepaliradio.com.
- "Desh Subba Pens PHILOSOPHY OF FEARISM" (Press release). broadwayworld.com. 25 March 2015.
