= Balkrishna Mabuhang =

Nepalese academic

Dr Balkrishna Mabuhang (Limbu)
- बालकृष्ण माबुहाङ

Balkrishna Mabuhang (Limbu) (also spelled Bal Krishna Mabuhang) is an associate professor at Tribuwan University, Nepal. He occasionally advocates about the current issues of the indigenous peoples of Nepal, and is an advisor to the Nepal Federation of Indigenous Nationalities.
