= Tanka Bahadur Subba =

Indian anthropologist from Darjeeling, West Bengal

- Born: Darjeeling district, West Bengal, India
- Education: University of North Bengal; Darjeeling; North Eastern Hill University

Tanka Bahadur Subba is currently the visiting professor at the Indian Institute of Technology (IIT), Gandhinagar. He was the second vice chancellor of Sikkim University in India Earlier, he was Head of Anthropology Department and Dean of School of Human and Environmental Sciences, North Eastern Hill University, Shillong, India. He was a gold medallist in MA in 1980 and his PhD, awarded in 1985 by University of North Bengal, was on "Caste, Class and Agrarian Relations in the Nepali Society of Darjeeling and Sikkim". Since then he has been researching on various aspects of the eastern Himalayas like ethnicity and development, cultural adaptation, politics of culture and identity, health and disease, and Nepali diaspora. Professor Subba has held prestigious academic positions throughout his career and has received awards like the Homi Bhabha Fellowship (Mumbai), Dr. Panchanan Mitra Lectureship (Asiatic Society, Kolkata) and DAAD Guest professorship at the Free University of Berlin and Baden-Wuerttemberg Fellowship at the South Asian Institute of Heidelberg University.

He is a member of the Advisory Board of the National Museum of Mankind in Bhopal, India. He has authored and edited about a dozen books and over 60 articles on various issues related to the eastern Himalayas. He is the editor of an internationally refereed biannual journal called The NEHU Journal for the past nine years and is a member of the editorial advisory boards of several international journals like Contributions to Indian Sociology (Delhi) and Asian Anthropology (Chinese University of Hong Kong).

== Bibliography ==
- The quiet hills: a study of agrarian relations in Hill Darjeeling, by Tanka Bahadur Subba. Christian Institute for the Study of Religion and Society, Bangalore, India by the I.S.P.C.K, 1985.
- Dynamics of a hill society: the Nepalis in Darjeeling and Sikkim Himalayas, by Tanka Bahadur Subba. Mittal Publications, New Delhi, 1989.
- Flight and adaptation: Tibetan refugees in the Darjeeling-Sikkim Himalaya, by Tanka Bahadur Subba. Library of Tibetan Works and Archives, 1990.
- Religion and society in the Himalayas, by Tanka Bahadur Subba and Karubaki Datta. Gyan Publishing House, New Delhi, India, 1991.
- Ethnicity, state, and development: a case study of the Gorkhaland movement in Darjeeling, by Tanka Bahadur Subba. Har-Anand Publications in association with Vikas Publications House, New Delhi, 1992.
- Politics of culture: a study of three Kirata communities in the eastern Himalayas, by Tanka Bahadur Subba. Orient Longman Limited, New Delhi, 1999. ISBN 8125016937.
- The Nepalis In Northeast India: A Community In Search Of Indian Identity, by T.B. Subba, A.C. Sinha, B.G. Tandon. Indus Publishing Company, 2000. ISBN 9788173871382.
- Anthropology of North-East India: A Textbook, by Tanka Bahadur Subba and G. C. Ghosh Orient Longman Limited, New Delhi, 2003. ISBN 8125023356.
- Indigeneity in India: Studies in Anthropology, Economy and Society, by B. G. Karlsson and Tanka Bahadur Subba. Kegan Paul, 2006. ISBN 9780710312105.
- Indian Nepalis: Issues and Perspectives, edited by Tanka Bahadur Subba, A. C. Sinha, G. S. Nepal, D. R. Nepal. Concept Publishing Company, 2009. ISBN 9788180694462.
