= Indigenous peoples of Sikkim =

Native populations of Sikkim, India

The indigenous people of Sikkim are the Lepchas and Limbus; the naturalized ethnic populations of Bhutias, Kiratis, and Indian Gorkha of Nepalese descendants who have an enduring presence in shaping the history of modern Sikkim. The indigeneity criteria for including all peoples of Sikkim and Darjeeling hills is a misnomer as it is clearly known that Lepchas are the first people who trace their origin and culture of their ethnogenesis to the historical and somewhat political geography of Sikkim history as is well documented by colonial and immigrant settler history. However, many tribes preceded the migration of the colonial powers and can trace their migratory background as well as ancestral heritage and a well-formed history of civilization and cultural locus that is not inherently indigenous to Sikkim.

Historically, Sikkim was a Princely State in the eastern Himalayas, a protectorate of India. Lepchas were the main inhabitants as well as the Ruler of the land until 1641. Lepchas are generally considered to be the first people, indigenous to Sikkim, while the major ethnic communities are mostly communities that function as tribal entities or ethnolinguistic groups with their own historical inception surrounding Sikkim and origins beyond the former Himalayan Kingdom. Apart from the Lepcha population, ethnic Limbu and Bhutia population settled Early/Medieval Sikkim or present day political or historical Greater Sikkim and withstanding landmarks of forts and villages inhabited by the two ethnic populations in eastern, western regions of present-day Sikkim is speculated. The presence of the two populations prior to pre-monarchical Sikkim is to be further studied.

== History ==
The Lepcha and Limbu is the earliest ethnic group to have settled in Sikkim. The word Sikkim was derived from "Sukhim" in Limbu language meaning new palace. They believe they are the autochthones while others considered that they were settled by the thirteenth century, coming from the hills before the arrival of the Tibetan Bhutias. The Bhutia who immigrated to Sikkim claimed descent from a common ancestor, a Khampa prince or chief named Khye-bum-sar, and were divided into fourteen main families. The Limbus or the Tsongs are an ethnic Nepali Kirati tribe indigenous to the tract west of the Teesta River who believe they are the original inhabitants of Limbuwan, a part of which is still retained in West Sikkim. Relations between the Lepcha and Tibetan peoples began in the thirteenth century with the signing of a blood brotherhood by the Lepcha Chief Thekong Tek and the Tibetan Prince Khye Bumsa at Kabi Lungchok in north Sikkim. The Bhutias introduced Buddhism to the region. The houses in which Bhutia people live are called "Khim"

In 1642, the Bhutia established a monarchy headed by the Chogyal (Tibetan: ཆོས་རྒྱལ་, Wylie: chos rgyal; divine king), and opened relations with Tibet. By the founding of the Bhutia monarchy, Tibetan sources considered Tibetans (Bhutia), Lepchas, and Limbu to be the "original races of the kingdom." Around 1819, the Lepchas were still the most numerous population, comprising roughly half of all Sikkimese, followed by Bhutias (30%) and Limbus (20%); sources disagree on whether the Bhutias outnumbered the Limbu or vice versa, but in any event, the Limbu frequently intermarried with the Lepcha. Throughout the nineteenth century, further groups of Tibetans known as Rui-chhung ("little families") migrated to Sikkim under British rule.

Nepalese tribes/castes like Mangars, Rais, Tamangs, Gurungs, Khas etc., also deserve special mention in view of the ethno-political scenario of Sikkim. In the 18th century the Gorkhali rulers and troops of Nepal conquered the western part of Sikkim and subsequently various other Nepali tribes settled there. By way of the Treaty of Titalia in 1817 between the British East India Company and Sikkim, the lands that were occupied by Nepal in earlier period were returned to Sikkim. This also brought the already settled Nepalese under Sikkim. The Newars, who are the business class of Nepali communities were brought to Sikkim by the ministers of Chogyal as they had the technology of minting coins and making pagoda-type house which were rather popular in Sikkim. They were also given permission to dig mines. This community brought a number of worker and service castes like Brahmins or Bahuns, Sanyasis, barbers and artisan castes like Kamis (smiths), Damais (tailors) and Sarkis (cobblers). The Nepalese also introduced the system of terraced cultivation to the hilly terrains of Sikkim which had a great impact on the cultivation of rice, maize and other cash crops like cardamom and ginger bringing good revenue to the state.

The first census of Sikkim in 1891 showed that two-thirds of the population, 25,955 out of total 30,458 were now Nepalese. Immigration was also encouraged by colonial landlords in order to raise rents in otherwise densely forested Sikkim. Thus the 18th century saw the settlement of a large number of Nepalese communities by way of conquest and migration. Discrimination between the heterogeneous Nepalese and other groups became a pressing social issue, however the government of the Chogyal in its later years strove to treat all subjects equally as citizens, and allowed democratic changes to move forward. These democratic and demographic changes culminated in a plebiscite in 1974, resulting in union with India as a State. Since joining India, indigenous groups have expressed anxiety over losing land, resources and power to those they view as non-Sikkimese "far above [them] in terms of political consciousness, resource position, education and manipulative qualities."

== Indigenous cultures ==
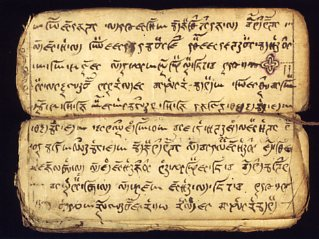
Lepcha (Róng) manuscript.

The indigenous Sikkimese show wide cultural variation.

The Lepcha speak Lepcha and use Lepcha script and the script is descended from the Tibetan script. Traditionally, Lepcha men wear gadas and tie a patang, a kind of weapon, on their waist and don a bamboo cap; women wear distinctive dresses and ornaments. Among Lepchas, there is a tradition of nuclear family structure and of monogamous marriage; though divorce is relatively rare, widowed persons customarily remarry.

Traditionally, the Lepcha practice a religion centered on shamans called mun, who officiate ceremonies and festivals, and bóngthíng, who are healers and are often female. The Lepcha converted to Buddhism in the eighteenth century, though their beliefs are largely syncretic.

Bhutias speak Sikkimese, which is also referred to as Dranjongke, written in the Tibetan script, proper. Men and women wear bakhus, while for women only this is accompanied by a hongu (blouse) around which they tie a woolen cloth around their waist called pangden if they are married. On special occasions they wear a scarf called a khada, which has become common feature in the Sikkimese society and culture even among the Nepalese of Sikkim. Historically, the Bhutia practiced polyandry before the nineteenth century; during the nineteenth century, wife-sharing among male siblings was also practiced, however, neither tradition survives today. Marriage rituals are traditionally elaborate and festive, officiated by a village chief as opposed to Buddhist lamas; late marriage and divorce are not uncommon practices among the Bhutia.

Most Lepchas, and Bhutias today practice local forms of Buddhism, incorporating aspects of Bön religion and animism, in contrast to the Hindu Nepalese majority. Followers of Buddhism in Sikkim are largely either Kagyudpa or Nyingma, though a small section of Bhutias claims to adhere to Bön in particular. Since the arrival of the Nepalese and Western missionaries, few Lepchas have converted to Christianity.

== Contemporary issues ==
The Lepcha reservation in Dzongu valley of north Sikkim is threatened by dam construction.

The Sikkim Bhutia Lepcha Apex Committee (SIBLAC), founded in 1999 is a tribal organisation that promotes the socio-politico-economic rights of the Bhutia and Lepcha people as detailed in Article 371F of the Indian Constitution.

== See also ==
- History of Sikkim
  - Rabdentse
  - Kabi Lungchok
- Sikkimese people
- List of Scheduled Tribes in India
- Jhakri
