= Demographics of Darjeeling =

Demographics of region

Darjeeling district's population today is constituted largely of the descendants of the indigenous and immigrant labourers that were employed in the original development of the town. A culture of both pride and dependence has evolved in the tea plantations where jobs have levelled off but housing can be inherited by a worker within the family. The population of Darjeeling meanwhile has grown substantially over the years. Many young locals, educated in government schools, have taken to migrating out for the lack of employment matching their skills. Like out-migrants from other regions of northeastern India, they have been subjected to discrimination and racism in some Indian cities.

== History ==
Although Darjeeling had its origins in the colonial period as a summer resort, it began to acquire characteristics of an "administrative" town in independent India after being made the headquarters of Darjeeling district in 1947. During the period 1961–2011, the population of Darjeeling increased at an accelerated rate (Figure 9), as did an "aspirational middle class" comprising families of professionals in the administration, and in retail and service industries. Indian Gorkha is a term that denotes the Nepali-speaking people of northeastern India as distinct from the Nepali-speaking inhabitants of Nepal. According to a 2014 study, although the demand for labour in the tea estates surrounding Darjeeling had stayed roughly constant since 1910, the population of Nepali-speaking workers and their families in the tea estates had grown throughout. As the excess population migrated up to Darjeeling in search of jobs and housing, they were propelled by the Gorkhaland agitation in the 1980s, which also had the effect of making many non-Gorkha families leave their homes in Darjeeling.

The town of Darjeeling has seen fluctuation in the growth of its population in the last century. However, growth in population has been more rapid from the 1970s onwards, exceeding the growth rates at the district level. The growth rate has touched the sky height of about 45% in the 1990s and thus is far above the national, state, and district average. The colonial town of Darjeeling was designed for a mere population of 10,000. So the population spurt has made the town more prone to the environmental problems in recent decades as the region is geologically relatively new with hosts of environmental problems and hence unstable in nature. Environmental degradation has adversely affected Darjeeling's appeal for tourists. The town as a district headquarters acts as the center of all types of economic activity, which attracts the rural folks of the district to migrate to the town for better opportunity. Besides, the pleasant climate of the town compels the people from the surrounding states to migrate and settle permanently in the region.

== 2011 census ==
Historical populations
Census year	Population	Growth (%)
1901	17,000
1911	19,000	12.3
1921	22,000	17.1
1931	21,000	-4.8
1941	27,000	28.5
1951	34,000	23.4
1961	41,000	21.0
1971	43,000	5.5
1981	58,000	34.4
1991	71,000	24.1
2001	103,000	44.6

According to provisional results of 2011 census, Darjeeling Urban Agglomeration had a population of 132,016, out of which 65,839 were males and 66,177 were females. The sex ratio was 1005 females per 1,000 males. The 0–6 years population was 7,382. Effective literacy rate for the population older than 6 years was 93.2 per cent.

The population of the Darjeeling municipal area in the Indian decennial census of 2011 (the last for which there is processed data) was 118,805 individuals; of those, 59,618 were females and 59,187 were males, yielding a gender ratio of 1007 females for every 1000 males. The population density of the Darjeeling municipality was 15,990 individuals per 1 square kilometre (0.39 sq mi). The literacy rate of Darjeeling town was 93.9%; the female literacy rate was 91.3% and the male was 96.4%. Among groups whose historical disadvantages have been recognized by the Constitution of India and designated for amelioration in subsequent commissions and programmes of the Government of India and state governments, the scheduled tribes of Darjeeling town constituted approximately 22.4% of the population, and the scheduled castes 7.7%. The work participation rate was 34.4%. The population that lived in slums was 25,026 individuals (21.1% of the population).

== 2001 census ==
As per the 2001 census, the Darjeeling urban agglomeration (which includes Pattabong Tea Garden), with an area of 12.77 km^{2}, has a population of 109,163. Also, the town has an additional average diurnal floating population of 20,500–30,000, mainly consisting of tourists and visitors. The population density is 8548 per km^{2}. The sex ratio is 1017 females per 1000 males – which is higher than the national average. The town houses about 31% of its population in the slums. This is the result of the unprecedented urban growth due to the unsustainable migration in the area (mainly of daily wage earners) for better opportunity.

== Ethnic groups and languages ==
Religion in Darjeeling municipality (2011)
Hinduism	66.51%
Buddhism	23.91%
Christianity	5.13%
Islam	3.94%
Other or not stated	0.51%

In the 2011 census, between them they practiced Hinduism (66.51%), Buddhism (23.9%), Christianity (5.1%) and Islam (3.9%). The Lepchas were considered the main indigenous community of the region, their original religion being a form of animism. The Gorkhali community was a complex mix of numerous castes and ethnic groups, with the roots of many in tribal and animist traditions. The accelerated growth of the town's population and the tightly packed living conditions in which different ethnicities mixed had created syncretic cultures in Darjeeling which had evolved away from their historical roots.

Indigenous ethnic groups include the Lepchas and Bhutias. The Kiratis are Rais, Limbus, Yakkhas Sunuwars, Dhimals and The Indian Gorkha ethnic groups include Chhetri, Thakuri, Bahun, Jogi/Sanyasi, Magar, Gurung, Kami, Damai, Tamang, Newar, Thami, Sherpa, Yalmo. Other communities are the Bengalis, Marwaris, Anglo-Indians, Han Chinese, Biharis and Tibetans. Nepali is the lingua franca of Darjeeling, and is spoken as a first language by all Gorkhas. others are Tibetan, Hindi, English and Bengali. Previously languages such as Rai, Limbu, Lepcha and Magar were widely spoken among many of the Gorkhas, but since the 1960s speakers of these languages have shifted rapidly to Nepali and lost their original tongues.

As of 2016, the population of the town of Darjeeling was predominantly Gorkha or Nepali speaking. There were also smaller numbers of Lepchas, Bhutias, Tibetans, Bengalis, Marwaris and Biharis.

== Migration ==
Although seasonal migration has long been a local feature, especially among the lower-income groups, substantial migration among middle-class youth is a 21st-century occurrence. Many educated young people in Darjeeling have begun to migrate out because the growth of jobs in the area has not kept pace with the numbers of people with tertiary degrees. Favoured destinations fall into three groups: neighbouring Gangtok in Sikkim, and Siliguri in North Bengal at the base of the Darjeeling hills; the large bustling cities of Delhi, Kolkata, Bangalore, and Mumbai; and Kathmandu, the capital of Nepal, where there is a linguistic culture in which they feel comfortable. The migrants are generally distinguishable by levels of education and access to economic privilege: those migrating to pursue higher education and professional careers, among which are engineering and journalism; and those looking for immediate employment, the common choices of which include call centres, beauty parlors, and dumpling stands. Both groups of migrants have experienced racism and economic and social discrimination in India's big cities, caused by their distinctive, more East Asian, physical appearance.

== Works cited ==
- Besky, Sarah (2014). The Darjeeling Distinction: Labor and Justic on Fair-Trade Tea Plantations in India. California Studies in Food and Culture Series. University of California Press. ISBN 978-0-520-27738-0.
- Brown, Trent; Scrase, Timothy J.; Ganguly-Scrase, Ruchira (2017). "Globalised dreams, local constraints: migration and youth aspirations in an Indian regional town". Children's Geographies. 15 (5): 531–544. doi:10.1080/14733285.2016.1274948. S2CID 152220638.
- Lama, Mahendra P.; Rai, Roshan P. (2016). "Chokho Pani: An Interface Between Religion and Environment in Darjeeling". Himalaya. 36 (2). ISSN 1935-2212.
- Middleton, Townsend; Shneiderman, Sara, eds. (2018). Darjeeling Reconsidered: Histories, Politics, Environments. Oxford University Press. ISBN 978-0-19-948355-6.
- Mondal, Tarun Kumar; Roychowdhury, Paramita (2018). "Water Scarcity in Himalayan Hill Town: A Study of Darjeeling Municipality, India". In Ray, Bhaswati; Shaw, Rajib (eds.). Urban Drought:Emerging Water Challenges in Asia. Disaster Risk Reduction: Methods, Approaches and Practices Series. Springer Nature. pp. 363–384. doi:10.1007/978-981-10-8947-3_21. ISBN 978-981-10-8946-6. S2CID 134349484.
