= Kabi Lungchok =

- Historical site
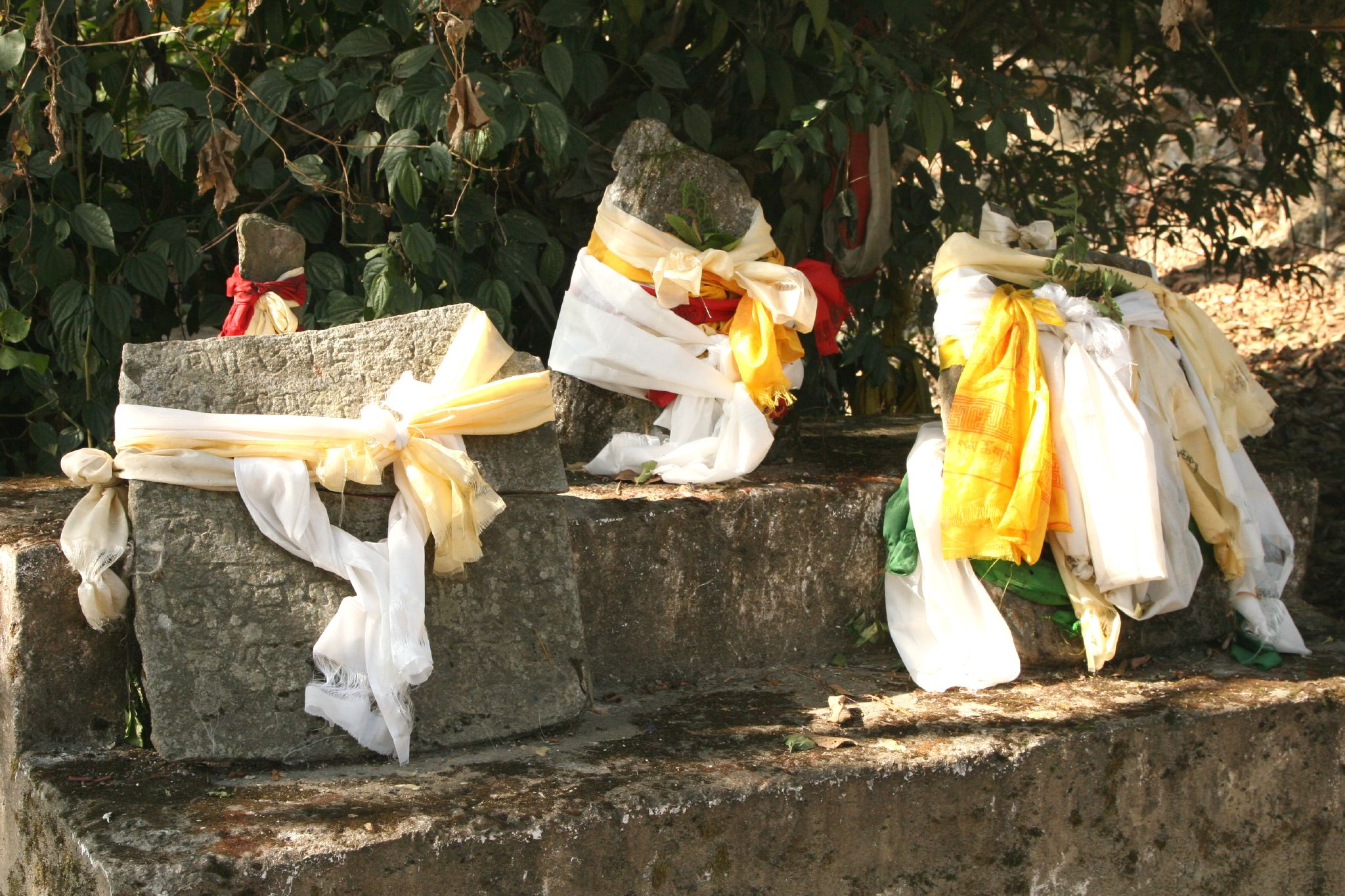

- Location in Sikkim, India Kabi Lungchok (India)
- Coordinates: 27.3983°N 88.35°E
- Country: India
- State: Sikkim
- District: North Sikkim

Languages
  - Official: Nepali, Bhutia, Lepcha, Limbu, Newari, Rai, Sherpa, Tamang and Sunwar
- Time zone: UTC+5:30 (IST)
- Vehicle registration: SK
- Stone pillars mark the location where Lepchas and Bhutias signed Blood Brothers Treaty

Kabi Lungchok (also spelled Kabi Longstok) is a historic site of significance, which is located 17 kilometres (11 mi) north of Gangtok on the Northern Highway in northeastern Indian state of Sikkim. The historicity of the site is attributed to the fact that the Lepchas, the ethnic tribals of Sikkim and Bhutias (ethnic Bhot), the immigrants from southern Bhot who settled down in Sikkim from the 14th century onwards, ceremonially signed a "Treaty of Blood Brotherhood" with religious fervour. Stone pillars mark the location where the treaty was signed. The Treaty was signed at Kabi Lungchok by the Bhot King, Khye Bumsa representing the Bhutias and the Lepcha Chief Thekong Tek. The literal meaning of 'Kabi Lungchok', pronounced ‘Kayu sha bhi Lungchok’, is "stone erected by our blood." Life-size statues of the Lepcha and Bhutia 'blood-brothers' who signed the treaty has been erected here.

== History ==
The history of Kabi Lungchok and that of Lepchas are closely linked, considered the original ethnic community who came to Sikkim from Tibet to escape from the rivalry between the "Yellow Hats" and the "Red Hats" sects of Vajrayana Buddhism of Tibet. Many people of the Red Hat sect of Tibetans migrated to Sikkim.

Lepchas themselves were reported to be originally Nagas of the Mikir, Garo and Khasi hills who came to Sikkim and absorbed into their fold the pre-historic tribes of Naong, Chang and the Mon of Sikkim according to the Official History of Sikkim by the Government of Sikkim. However this is false. The signing of blood brotherhood in Kabi Lungchok was between three tribes Mon referring to Lepchas, Tsong or Chang or the Limbus and Lho, literally Southerners in Tibetan referring to the Bhutia migrants who settled in Sikkim.

Another important fact to be noted is that Sikkim was much larger during this period until the raids from Nepal and Bhutan followed. Sikkim consisted the whole of Limbuwan, Ilam and other districts of Eastern Nepal and in the west, it had territories extended to Ha Valley of present-day Bhutan. The Gorkha invaders had also captured territories in the Teesta region including the present day territories of Darjeeling and Kalimpong. These were later gifted to the British by the Maharaja of Sikkim.

Tsongs or Limbus inhabited largely the eastern regions which was wholly usurped by the Gorkha invasion. Also, Tsongs are said to have migrated from Tibet considering their name and language affinity with Tibetans.

It is also inferred that the cultural traits of dress and family values of the Lepchas is akin to the Khasis of Meghalaya and their language has close affinity to that of Tangkul Nagas of Northern Manipur. The exact period when this migration happened is, however, not established. The Lepchas, known for their peaceful, religious and reserved nature led a tranquil tribal life in the mountains of Sikkim practicing shifting cultivation (growing maize and rice) as their vocation, and worshipped "nature or spirits of nature."

Some time in the 15th century, they organized themselves under the leadership of Tur ve pa no who was elected their king. Subsequent to his death in a skirmish, three kings, namely Tur Song Pa No, Tur Aeng Pa No and Tur Alu Pa No, took up the reigns of the kingdom, and their reign also ended with the death of Tur Alu Pa No. The Lepchas then adopted the democratic process of electing their leader and followed the leaders advice on all matters.

It was during this period of the democratic rule by Lepchas that the Tibetans started to migrate to Sikkim. The reason for this migration is attributed mainly to the clash between the followers of the "Yellow Hats" and the "Red Hats" sects of Vajrayana Buddhism in Tibet. This conflict resulted in the Tibetans belonging to the Red Hat sect migrating from Tibet in large numbers seeking refuge in Sikkim. The Tibetan migrants were then called as Bhutias in Sikkim. The Bhutias, who were Buddhists of the Red Hat sect, were also successful in converting many Lepchas to Buddhism. However, Lepchas remained aloof most of the time.

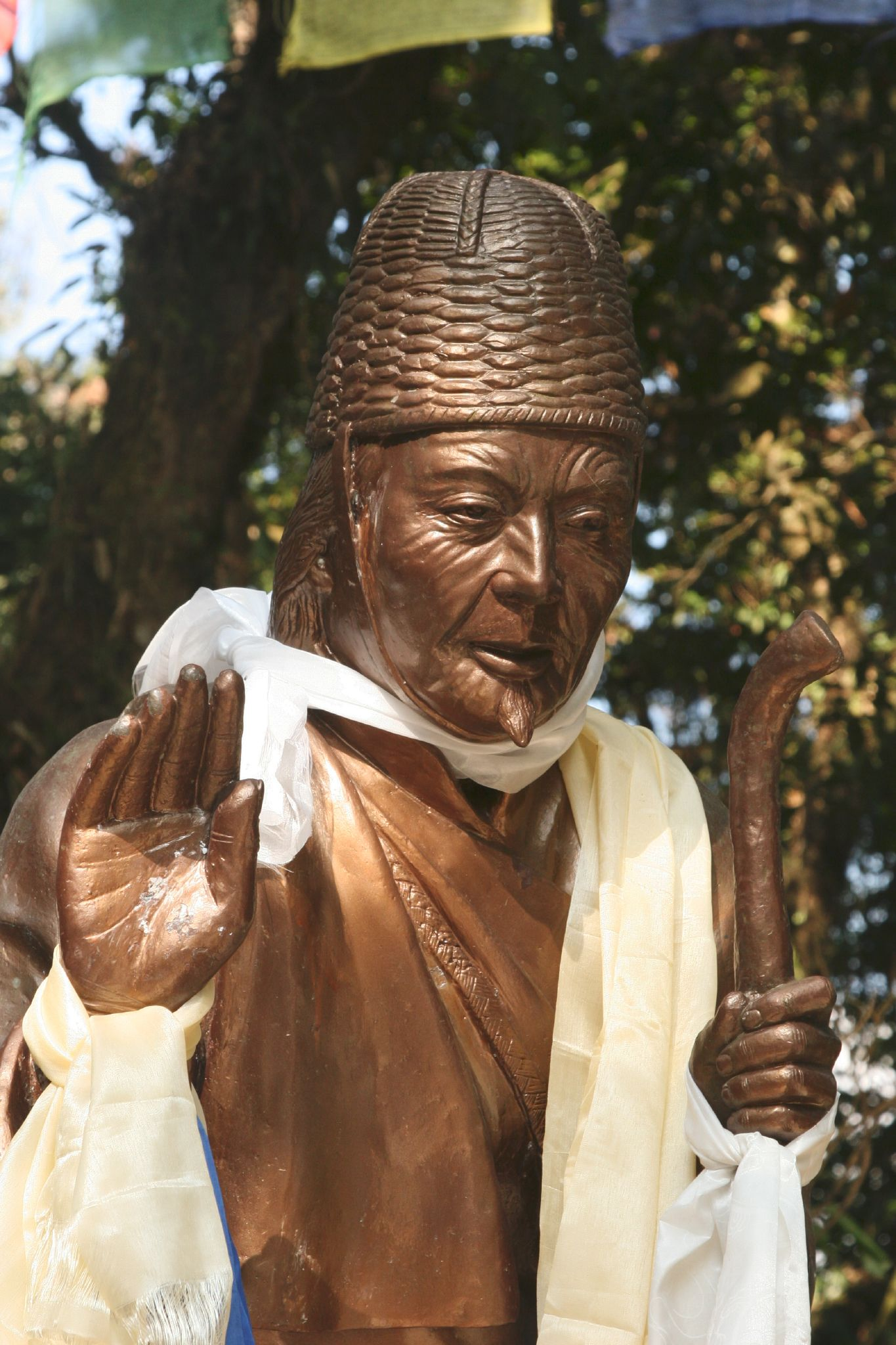
Thekong Tek, a Lepcha ruler, one of the signatories to the treaty of blood brotherhood signed between Lepchas and Bhutias

In the 17th century, Bhutias, in order to maintain cordial relationship with the Lepchas then decided with the help of three revered lamas from Western Tibet to consecrate a local Sikkimese person from Gangtok as the Chogyal of Sikkim. Thus, the first formal dynasty of the Namgyals in Sikkim came to be established in 1642. However, Phuntsog Namgyal, the first Chogyal or the King was made the temporal and spiritual leader of Sikkim after duly verifying that his antecedents were strongly linked to the 9th-century prince of the Kingdom of Minvang in eastern Tibet. This dynasty had ruled Chumbi and Teesta valley for considerable time. In the 13th century, a prince of this dynasty known by the name Guru Tashi, based on a clairvoyant vision, decided to go south of Tibet to Sikkim, then known as "Denzong-the valley of rice" to seek his fortune. While travelling on this mission with his family, he came to the Sakya Kingdom where a monastery was being built, and they were facing problems in erecting the pillars of the monastery. Then, one of Tashi's five sons, the elder son, erected the pillars of the monastery on his own and was honoured with the epithet "Khye Bumsa" (meaning: superior of ten thousand heroes). Pleased with the achievement of Khye Bumsa, the Sakya King gave his daughter in marriage to him. Bumsa then settled down in Chumbi valley where he met the Lepcha religious leader, Thekong Tek, several times seeking his blessings to beget children. Following the blessings of Thekong Tek, Bhums'a wife gave birth to three sons, and out of gratitude he visited the grand old sage in several times more in Sikkim nurturing an amicable relationship between them. However, Thekong Tek had no children and there was also a prophecy that one of Khye Bumsa's descendants would become the ruler of Sikkim. Thekong Tek then decided that after his death Bhumsa would take over the reins of power in his kingdom. Then a treaty of blood brotherhood was signed at Kabi Lungchok between Thekong Tek and Khye Bumsa to reinforce the bonding between the two communities of Lepchas and Bhutias of Sikkim. The solemn oath taken on the occasion was that Bhumsa "would not discriminate his newly acquired Lepcha subjects". Since then this location has been commemorated as symbol of friendship and brotherhood between the Lepchas and Bhutias of Sikkim and stone pillars have been erected to mark the place symbolically. In 1642, Phuntsog Namgyal, the grandson of Khye Bumsa was crowned the first Chogyal of Sikkim at Yuksom by Rimpoche Lhatsun Chempo, the founder of the Nyingmapa order in Sikkim. This event is also marked by the Statue of Unity installed opposite to Tourist Information Office and close to the Thakur Bari Temple in Gangtok.

== Geography ==
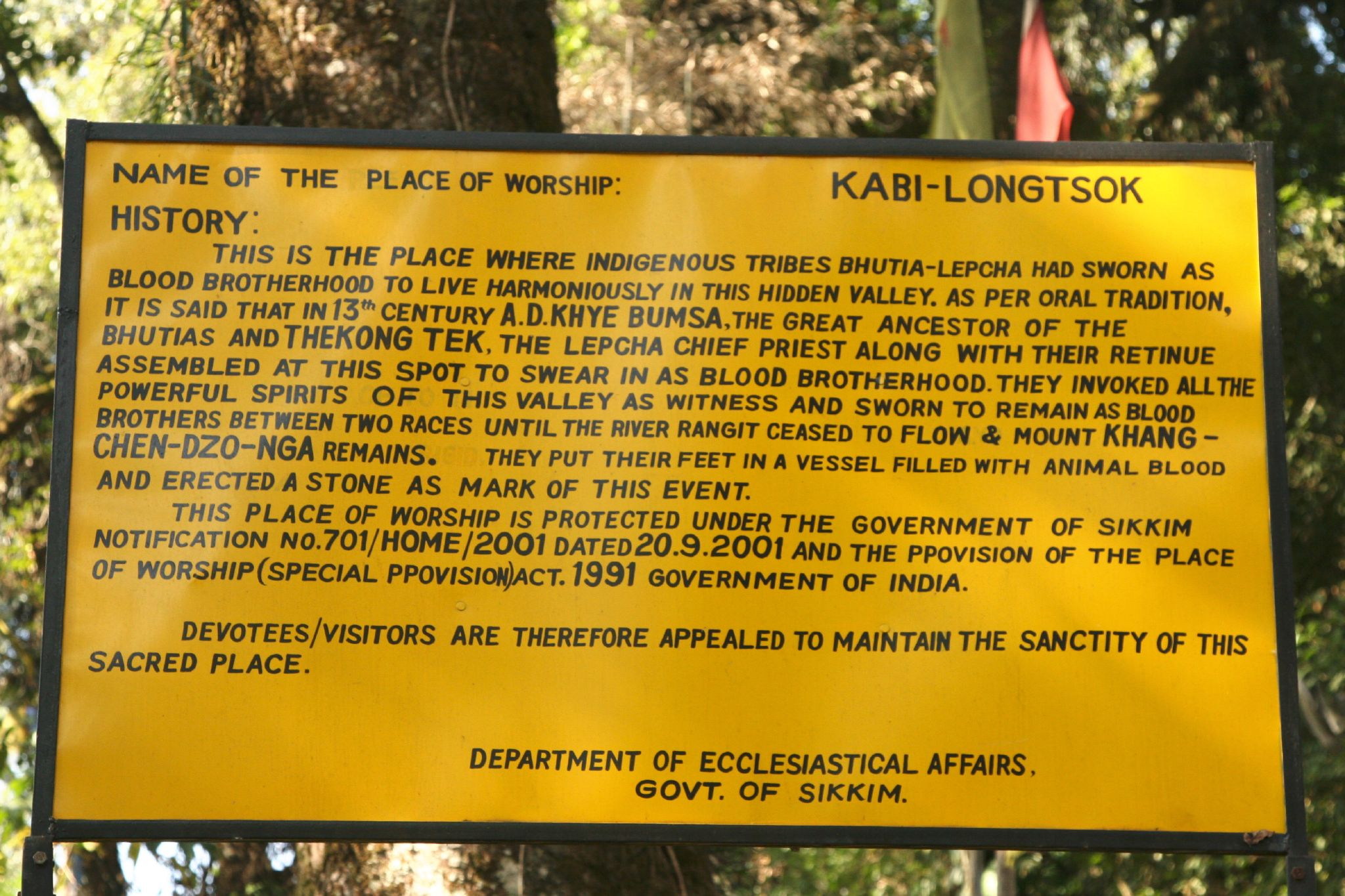
A plaque at Kabi Lungchok taken in 2008

The historical site is located in a dense forest area on the North Sikkim Highway near Phodong. The area abounds in natural scenic beauty of rich forests with varied flora, shimmering streams, waterfalls and also many cultural monuments and historic sites. Sub Tropical mixed Broad-Leaved Hill Forest is the forest type in the area comprising: Alnus nepalensis (Uttis), Castanopsis (Kattus), Macaranga (Malata), Engelhardia spicata (Mahua), Michelia (Champ), Toona ciliata (Tooni), Machilus (Kawla), Symplocos (Kharane) and Cinnamomum (Sinkoli). There are a number of water falls in the area and one such water fall is known as the 'Seven Sister waterfalls'.

Kabi Lungchok region is also home to several species of birds such as: the pariah kite, crested serpent eagle, shaheen falcon, rufous-necked hornbill, chestnut-breasted partridge, black-breasted parrotbill, grey-crowned prinia and Ward’s trogon. Butterflies and invertebrates such as riverine fish, frogs and toads are also recorded in the region.

== Other information ==
Ritual prayers are held every year to commemorate the historic treaty signed here. The Chief Minister of Sikkim has recently announced that this historic place will be developed into a destination for tourism.

== See also ==
- Indigenous peoples of Sikkim
- Rabdentse
