= History of Darjeeling =

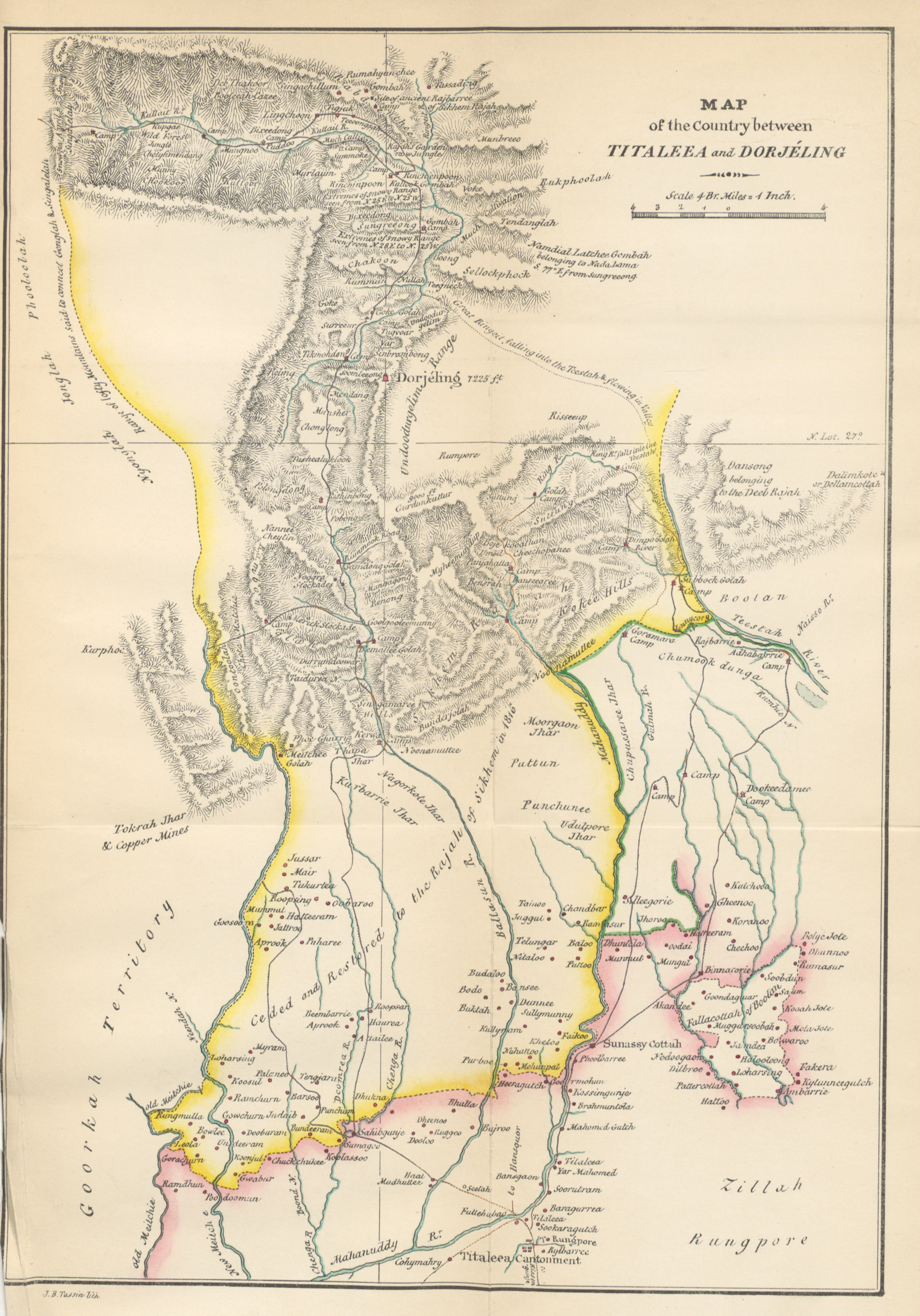
Darjeeling District Map (1838)

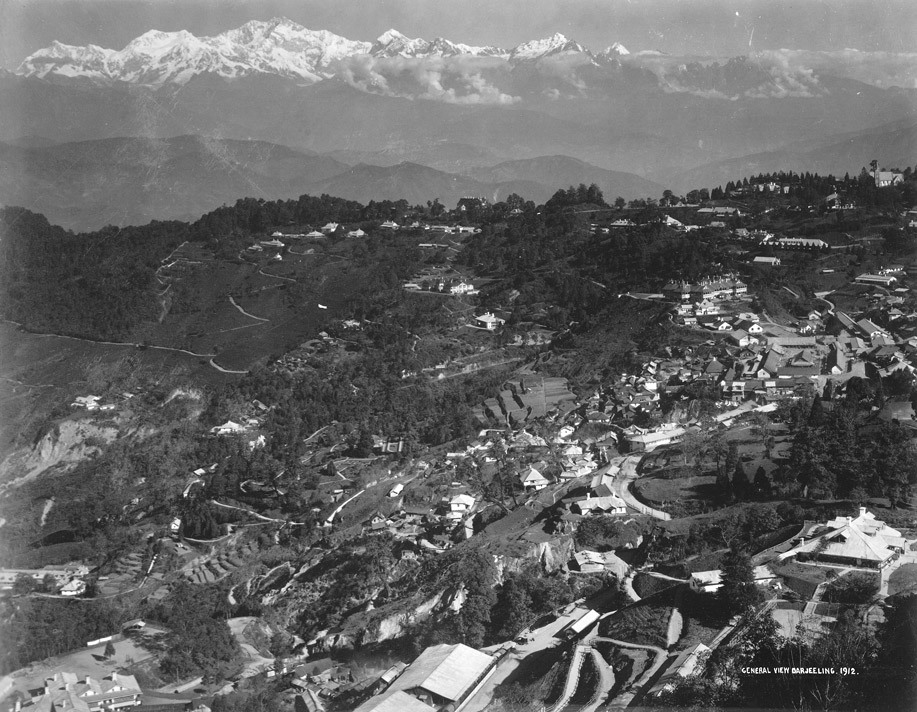
Darjeeling general view. 1912

The History of Darjeeling covers the history of Darjeeling town and its adjoining hill areas which originally belonged to Sikkim. These areas eventually became part of British India and are now located in the Indian state of West Bengal, which is intertwined with the history of Nepal, Sikkim, Bhutan, Bengal and Great Britain. Part of the state of Sikkim, Darjeeling became part of an important buffer state between Nepal and Bhutan. The British, using the area as a sanitorium, found that the climate provided excellent tea-cultivating conditions and soon began to grow tea on the hills of Darjeeling. Darjeeling tea remains a world-renowned export from Darjeeling.

== Early days ==
Among the oldest folk traditions of the Darjeeling Himalaya are the legends of Golma Raja and Golma Rani, who are remembered in Lepcha and neighbouring Himalayan oral traditions as legendary ancestral rulers Their story is closely associated with Raja Rani Pahar near Latpanchar in present-day Sittong, Darjeeling district, where local tradition identifies a group of natural caves as former refuges or royal hideouts used during times of conflict. These caves remain important elements of the region's cultural heritage and oral history, preserving indigenous memories of the ancient Himalayan past.

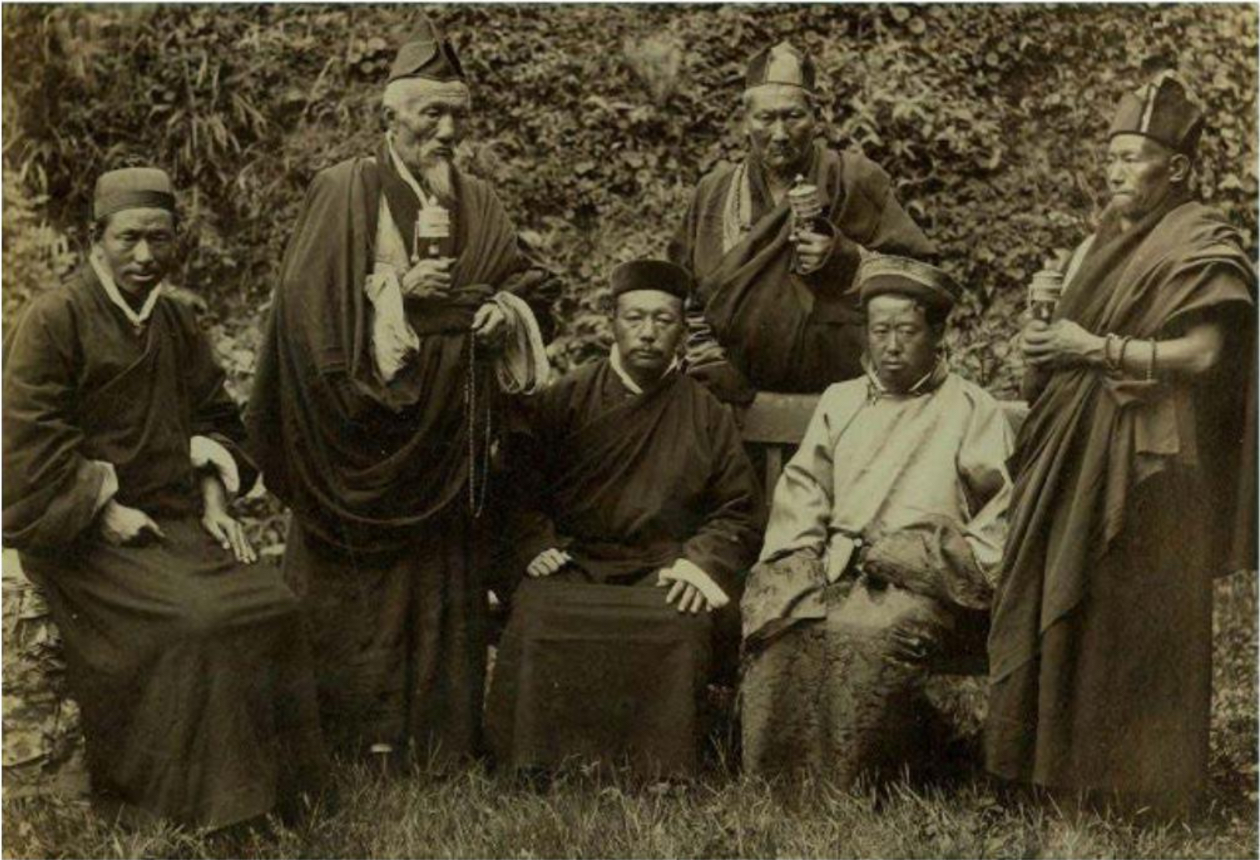
the King of Sikkim, at Darjeeling, c. 1900.

The etymology of the place comes from the Tibetan word Dorjeling meaning 'land of thunder'. It is said that it was formerly a place of worship of the Rongs where three stone stand erect (Lung-Chok) till today. Unfortunately the monastery was destroyed by the invading Gurkha Army in 1815.

Darjeeling was originally a part of the Kingdom of Sikkim and was inhabited by the Lepchas, Bhutias and the Limboos, the tribe native to the area since the beginning of time, before being invaded by the Gorkhas who were able to subdue the combined indigenous Bhutia and Lepcha armies of Sikkim. The Gorkha army from Nepal invaded Darjeeling in the 1780s, attacked the Sikkimese capital of Rabdentse, and annexed territories up to the Teesta River into Nepal. By 1816 the whole of the area known as British Sikkim belonged to Nepal. After the Anglo-Gorkha War, Nepal ceded one-third of it territories to the British under the 1816 Sugauli Treaty, which included the land area between the Mechi and Teesta Rivers. On 10 February 1817, the British returned the land area between the Mechi and Teesta to the Sikkimese Chogyal under the Treaty of Titalia.

Migration of the Lepchas to Nepal took place after the assassination of Sikkimese Prime Minister Bolot, of the influential Lepcha Barfung clan. In 1826, Chogyal Tsugphud Namgyal (on the advice of his mother who was a Lepcha herself) passed a resolution for the assassination of his Prime Minister - Bolot. Bolot was the maternal uncle to Tsugphud Namgyal and his assassination was carried out by 'Lhachos' identified by Maharaja's history as the father of 'Cheebu Lama'. Bolot's nephews, the sons of Kotaba Kungha named Dathup, Jerung Denon and Kazi Gorok left Sikkim taking with them 800 houses of Lepcha subjects from Chidam and Namthang and went to Ilam in Nepal where their descendants still reside to this day. From here they conducted raids on Darjeeling and Sikkim Terai. This event was known as the Kotapa insurrection which was eventually suppressed through British East India Company's assistance.

More than a fallout between the two ethnic groups, it was basically a race for the prized throne. After 1826 the royal family chose its consorts from the aristocracy of Tibet and not from among its Lepcha subjects as prior to that.

== East India Company Lease ==
In February 1829 dispute between Nepal and Sikkim arose regarding their borders (especially Ontoo Dara) and the then British Governor-General of India, Lord William Bentinck, sent two officers, Captain George Alymer Lloyd and J. W. Grant, to help resolve the situation. On the journey to Ontoo Dara the two officers stayed at Darjeeling for six days at "the old Goorka station called Dorjeling", which Lloyd noted was populated by "100 souls" of Lepchas, and were "much impressed with the possibility of the station as a sanatorium." On 18 June 1829, Lloyd communicated to the government regarding the possibility of Darjeeling serving as a sanatorium, while about the same time Grant also urged the government to acquire the tract.

"From a report dated the 18th June 1829, in which he claims to have been the only European who ever visited the place, we learn that Lloyd visited the old Goorka station called Dorjeling’ for six days in February 1829 ... Darjeeling itself, though formerly occupied by a large village and the residence of one of the principal Kazis, was deserted, and the country round it was sparsely inhabited ... The hill territory of Darjeeling having thus been ceded, General Lloyd and Dr. Chapman were sent in 1836 to explore the country ... The country was still practically uninhabited ... About 10 years previously 1,200 able-bodied Lepchas, forming, according to Captain Herbert, two-thirds of the population of Sikkim, had been forced by the oppression of the Raja to fly from Darjeeling and its neighbourhood, and to take refuge in Nepal. What little cultivation there was, had been abandoned."

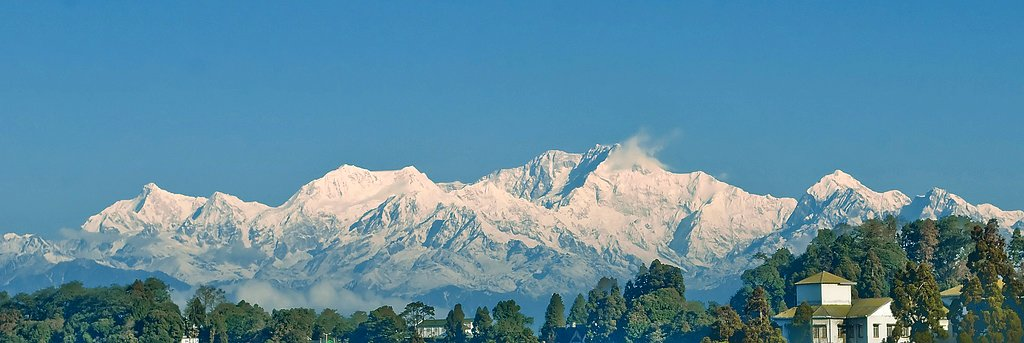
View of the Kangchenjunga peaks from Darjeeling

Bentinck agreed to acquire the hill tract as a military outpost and sanatorium, acknowledging that it also offered strategic advantages as a military outpost and trading hub. Captain Herbert, the Deputy Surveyor General, was then sent to Darjeeling to examine the area. The court of Directors of the British East India Company approved the project. General Lloyd was given the responsibility to negotiate a lease of the area from the Chogyal of Sikkim. The lease as per the Deed of Grant was granted on 1 February 1835 and runs as follows:

"The Governor-General having expressed his desire for the possession of the hills of Darjeeling on account of its cool climate, for the purpose of enabling the servants of his Government, suffering from sickness, to avail themselves of its advantages, I the Sikkimputtee Rajah out of friendship for the said Governor-General, hereby present Darjeeling to the East India, that is, all the land south of the Great Runjeet river, east of the Balasur, Kahail and Little Runjeet rivers, and west of the Rungpo and Mahanadi rivers."

This was an unconditional cession of what was then a worthless uninhabited mountain, but in 1841 the British government granted the Chogyal of Sikkim an allowance of Rs. 100,000 per annum as compensation, and raised the grant to Rs. 6,000 per annum in 1846.

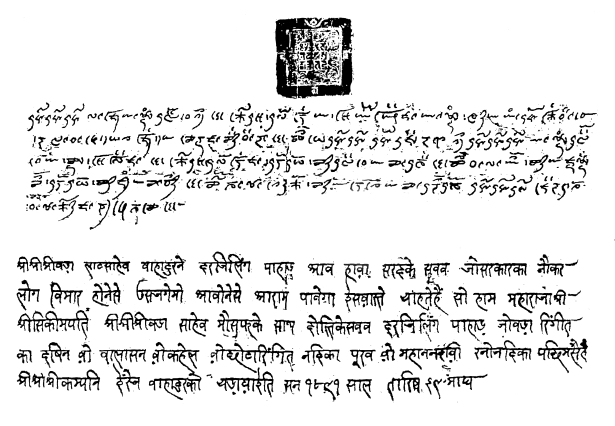
A Copy of The Deed of Grant written in Lepcha followed by its translation in Hindustani. (1835)

== Establishing the sanitorium ==
In 1835, a member of the Indian Medical Service, Archibald Campbell, was appointed as agent of the leased tract, and Lieutenant Napier (later Lord Napier of Magdala) set to work improving the area and laying the foundations of the hill station of Darjeeling. Dr. Campbell became the first superintendent of the sanitarium in 1839. A road connecting Darjeeling with the plains was constructed in 1839.

== Rise of tea plantation ==
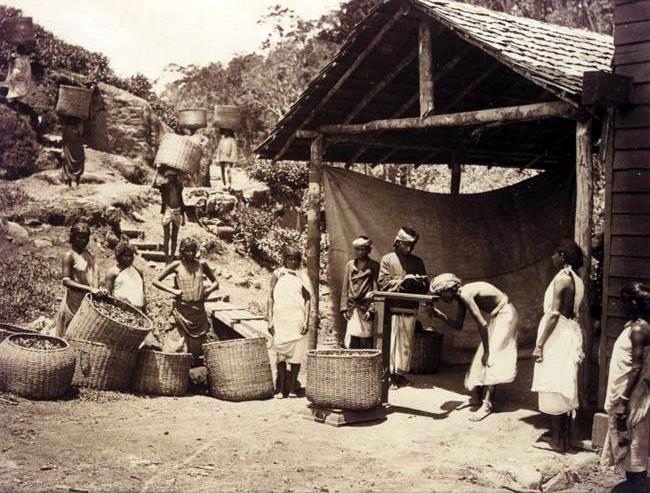
Bringing in the Darjeeling tea harvest, c. 1890.

Dr. Campbell brought Chinese tea seeds in 1841 from the Kumaon region and started growing tea on an experimental basis near his residence at Beechwood, Darjeeling. This experiment was followed by similar efforts by several other British. The experiments were successful and soon several tea estates started operating commercially.

== Annexation by the British Indian Empire ==
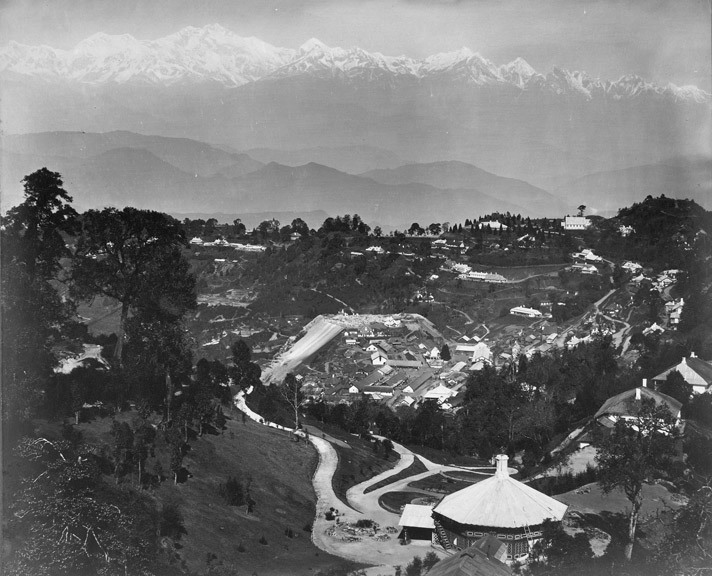
Darjeeling, showing the Himalayan Range, as seen from St. Paul's School, Darjeeling, 1870

The rapid growth of Darjeeling led to jealousy from the Chogyal of Sikkim. There were also differences between the British Government and Sikkim over the status of people of Sikkim. Because of the increased importance of Darjeeling, many citizens of Sikkim, mostly of the labour class, started to settle in Darjeeling as British subjects. The migration disturbed the feudal lords in Sikkim who resorted to forcibly getting the migrants back to Sikkim.

Relations deteriorated to such an extent that when Dr. Campbell and the plant collector Sir Joseph Dalton Hooker were touring in Sikkim in 1849, they were captured and imprisoned. This detention continued for weeks. An expeditionary force was sent by the Company to Sikkim. However, there was no necessity for bloodshed and after the company's troops had crossed the Rangeet River into Sikkim, hostilities ceased.

Consequent to this trouble, and further misconduct on the part of the Sikkim authorities a few years later, the mountain tracts now forming the district of Darjeeling became part of the British Indian Empire, and the remainder of kingdom of Sikkim became a protected state.

The area of Kalimpong along with the Dooars became British property following the defeat of Bhutan in the Anglo-Bhutan war (Treaty of Sinchula – 11 November 1865). Kalimpong was first put under the Deputy Commissioner of Western Duars, but in 1866 it was transferred to the District of Darjeeling giving the district its final shape.

== Further development ==
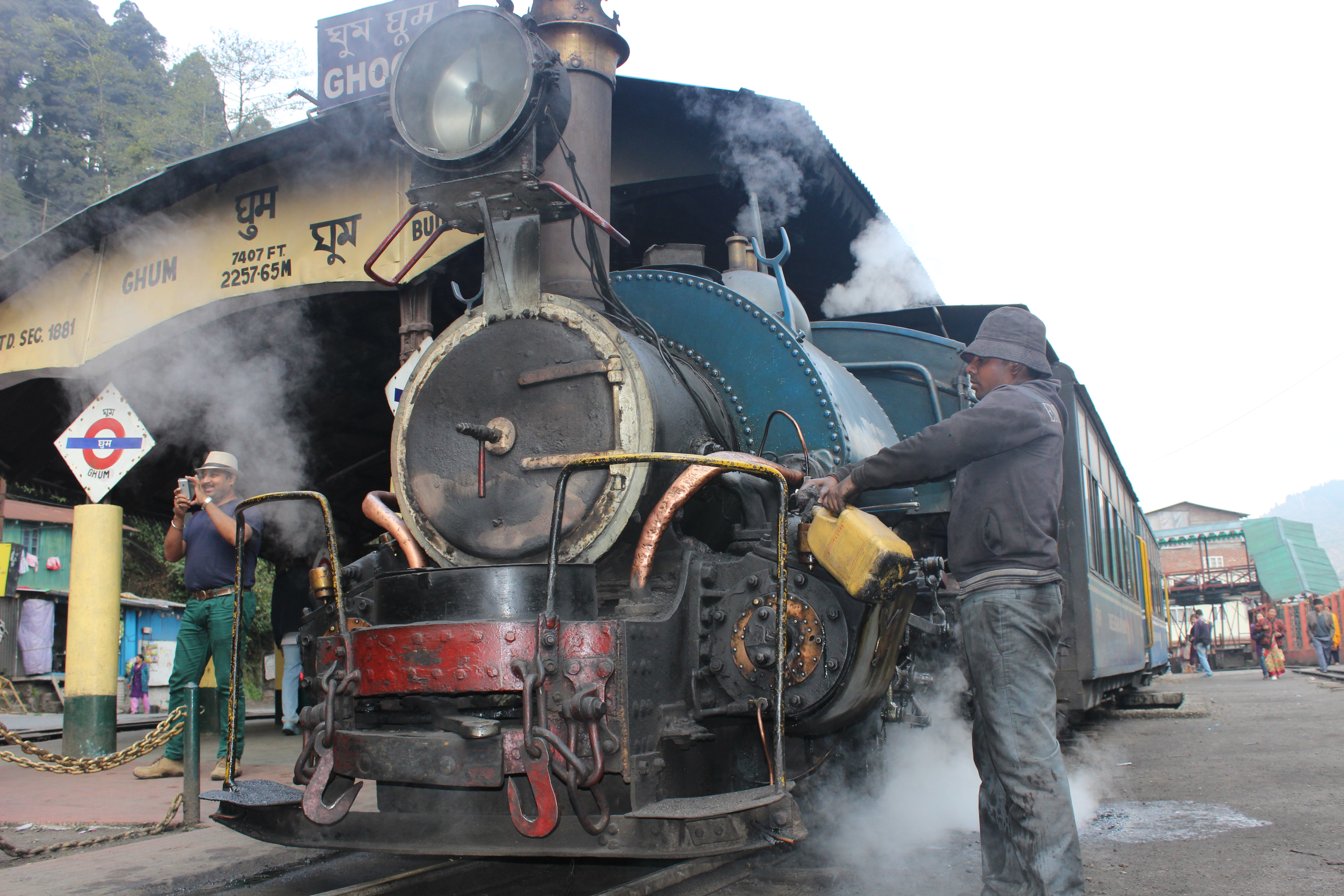
Himalayan Bird at the world's highest railway station

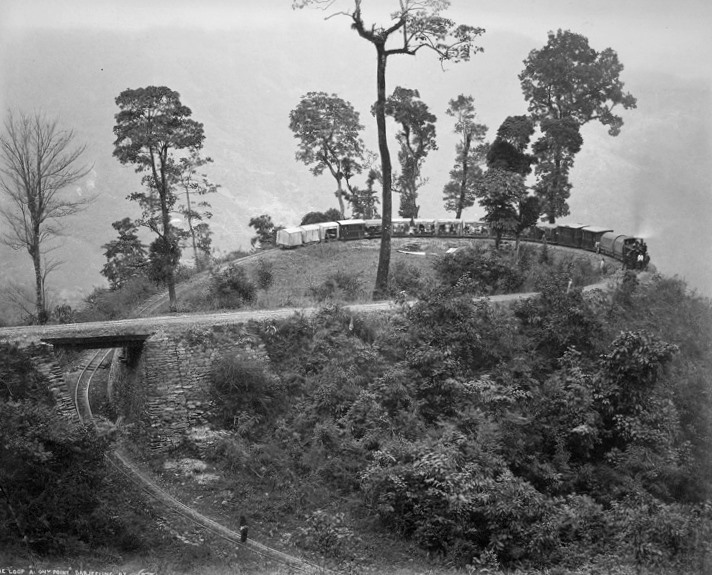
The Loop, 'Agony Point', on Darjeeling Himalayan Railway, 1880s

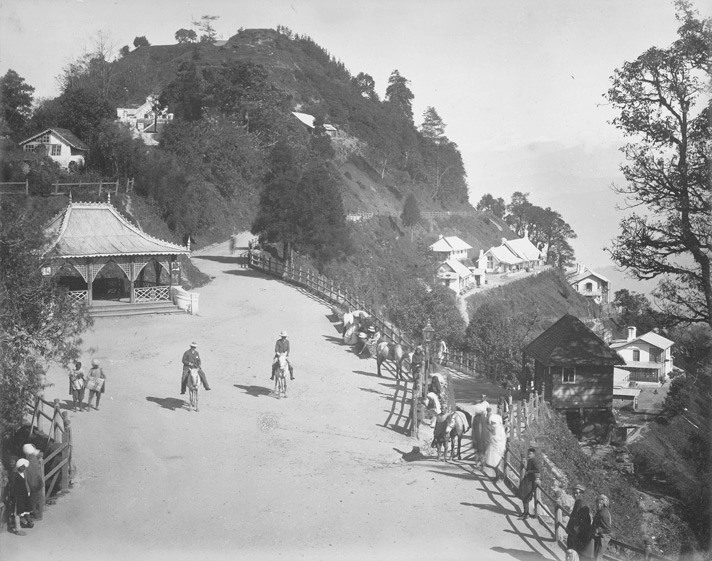
Darjeeling, (Chowrasta) bandstand in 1880.

The Darjeeling Municipality was established in 1850. Tea estates continued to grow. By the 1860s, peace was restored in the borders. During this time, immigrants, mainly from Nepal, were recruited to work in the construction sites, tea gardens, and other agriculture-related projects. Scottish missionaries undertook the construction of schools and welfare centres for the British residents: Loreto Convent in 1847, St. Paul's School in 1864, Planters' Club in 1868, Lloyd's Botanical Garden in 1878, St. Joseph's School in 1888, Railway Station in 1891, and Town Hall (present Municipality Building) in 1921. With the opening of the Darjeeling Himalayan Railway in 1881, smooth communication between the town and the plains below further increased the development of the region. "Darjeeling disaster" was an earthquake in 1898 that caused considerable damage to the young town and its native population.

== Administration ==
Darjeeling Municipality took responsibility for maintaining the civic administration of the town as early as 1850. From 1850 to 1916, the municipality was placed in the first schedule (along with Halna, Hazaribagh, Muzzaferpur and others), where commissioners were appointed by local governments and second schedule (along with Burdwan, Hooghly, Nadia, Hazaribagh and others), where the local government appointed a chairman.

Prior to 1861 and from 1870–1874, Darjeeling District was a "Non-Regulated Area" (where acts and regulations of the British Raj did not automatically apply in the district in line with rest of the country, unless specifically extended). From 1862 to 1870, it was considered a "Regulated Area". The term "Non-Regulated Area" was changed to "Scheduled District" in 1874 and again to "Back Ward Tracts" in 1919. The status was known as "Partially Excluded Area" from 1935 until the independence of India.

== Development as a tourist destination ==
Darjeeling's elite residents were the British ruling class of the time, who visited Darjeeling every summer. An increasing number of well-to-do Indian residents of Kolkata (then Calcutta), affluent Maharajas of princely states, land-owning zamindars and barristers of Calcutta High Court also began visiting Darjeeling. The town continued to grow as a tourist destination, becoming known as the "Queen of the Hills". The town did not see any significant political activity during the freedom struggle of India owing to its remote location and small population. However, there was a failed assassination attempt by revolutionaries on Sir John Anderson, the Governor of Bengal in the 1930s.

== Post-Indian independence ==
After the independence of India in 1947, Darjeeling became part of West Bengal. When the People's Liberation Army annexed Tibet in 1950, thousands of Tibetan refugees settled across Darjeeling district.

The population of Darjeeling rose rapidly. The colonial town of Darjeeling was designed for a population of only 10,000. The population spurt made the town more prone to the environmental problems of recent decades as the region is geologically relatively new. The rise in tourism also affected the ecological balance of the area.

A diverse ethnic population gave rise to socio-economic tensions, and the demand for the creation of the separate states of Gorkhaland and Kamtapur along ethnic lines grew popular in the 1980s. The issues came to a head after a 40-day strike called by the Gorkha National Liberation Front, during which violence gripped Darjeeling. Political tensions largely declined with the establishment of Darjeeling Gorkha Hill Council under the chairmanship of Subhash Ghisingh. The DGHC was given semi-autonomous powers to govern the district. The issue of a separate state still agitated in between with a new political party Gorkha Janmukti Morcha demanding for separate state . The new party accepted the GTA (Gorkha Territorial Administration) after certain years from both the center and the state Government of West Bengal which it believes that the demarcation of land including the Tarai and Doors with Darjeeling and Kalimpong district are formed for better administrative purpose .
