= Dumpra =

Traditional dress of Lepcha men

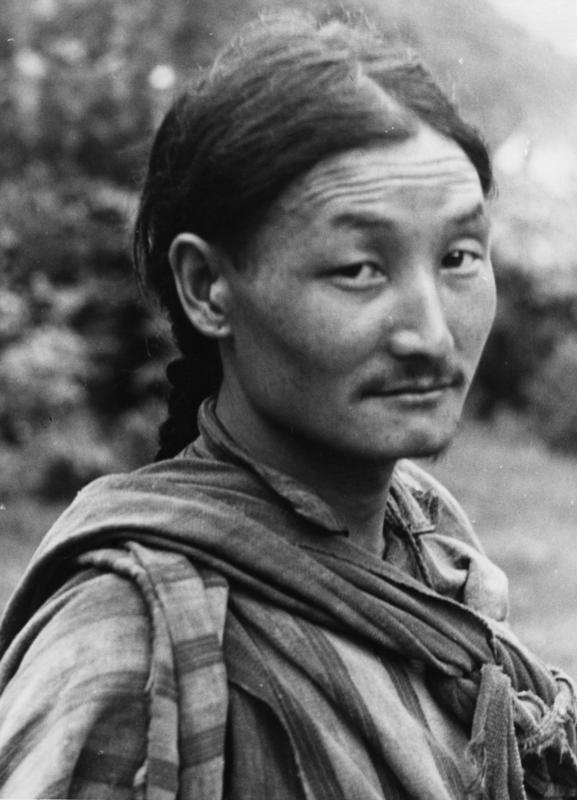
Lepcha man wearing a dumpra.

Dumpra (also dumprá; Lepcha for "male dress") is the traditional dress of Lepcha men. It consists of a multicolored, hand-woven cloth pinned at one shoulder and held in place by a waistband called a gyatomu, usually worn over a white shirt and trousers. With it, men wear a flat round cap called a thyáktuk, with stiff black velvet sides and a multicolored top topped by a knot. Rarely, the traditional cone-shaped bamboo and rattan hats are worn.

== See also ==
- Lepcha people
- Dumdyam
