= Golma Raja and Golma Rani =

Golma Raja and Golma Rani (Nepali: गोल्मा राजा,गोल्मा रानी) are legendary ancestral figures preserved in the oral traditions of several Kirati and neighboring Indigenous communities, particularly in Rai, Sunuwar, Hayu, Thami as well as Tamang and Lepchas. Their stories are found across Sindhuli, Dolakha, Bhojpur, Khotang and Darjeeling, although the narratives differ by region and community.

== Folklore ==
Golma Raja Rani hill in Bhojpur District, Nepal

Ancestral stone of Rai people in Chisapani, Khotang, historical connection with Golma Raja and Golma Rani

Golma Raja and Golma Rani occupy an important place in the oral traditions of the eastern Himalayas, particularly among the Kirati Rai, Sunuwar, Thami, Tamang, Hayu and Lepcha communities. According to Praveen Puma (Parshuram Rai), their earliest traditional homeland is associated with Dolakha, from where their legends spread through Ramechhap, Sindhuli, Okhaldhunga, Khotang, Bhojpur, and Sankhuwasabha, becoming deeply embedded in Kirati cultural memory.

Golma Raja Rani caves exploration in 2023 Sittong, Darjeeling district

In Darjeeling, the sacred Raja-Rani Pahar in Mahananda, Latpanchar forest, Sittong related Lepcha folklore preserve parallel traditions connected with Golma Raja and Golma Rani and the legendary Lepcha ruler Turve (Torve) Pano. Although there is no conclusive archaeological or historical evidence confirming Golma Raja and Golma Rani as historical rulers, their stories remain an important part of the indigenous cultural heritage of the eastern Himalayas, preserving memories of sacred landscapes, migration, ancestry, and the shared traditions of Kirati and Lepcha communities.
