= Lepcha (Unicode block) =

- Range: U+1C00..U+1C4F (80 code points)
- Plane: BMP
- Scripts: Lepcha
- Major alphabets: Lepcha
- Assigned: 74 code points
- Unused: 6 reserved code points

Unicode version history
- 5.1 (2008): 74 (+74)

Unicode documentation
- Code chart ∣ Web page

Lepcha is a Unicode block containing characters for writing the Lepcha language of Sikkim and West Bengal, India.

Lepcha^{[1]}^{[2]} Official Unicode Consortium code chart (PDF)
	0	1	2	3	4	5	6	7	8	9	A	B	C	D	E	F
U+1C0x	ᰀ	ᰁ	ᰂ	ᰃ	ᰄ	ᰅ	ᰆ	ᰇ	ᰈ	ᰉ	ᰊ	ᰋ	ᰌ	ᰍ	ᰎ	ᰏ
U+1C1x	ᰐ	ᰑ	ᰒ	ᰓ	ᰔ	ᰕ	ᰖ	ᰗ	ᰘ	ᰙ	ᰚ	ᰛ	ᰜ	ᰝ	ᰞ	ᰟ
U+1C2x	ᰠ	ᰡ	ᰢ	ᰣ	ᰤ	ᰥ	ᰦ	ᰧ	ᰨ	ᰩ	ᰪ	ᰫ	ᰬ	ᰭ	ᰮ	ᰯ
U+1C3x	ᰰ	ᰱ	ᰲ	ᰳ	ᰴ	ᰵ	ᰶ	᰷				᰻	᰼	᰽	᰾	᰿
U+1C4x	᱀	᱁	᱂	᱃	᱄	᱅	᱆	᱇	᱈	᱉				ᱍ	ᱎ	ᱏ
Notes: 1. As of Unicode version 16.0; 2. Grey areas indicate non-assigned code points

== History ==
The following Unicode-related documents record the purpose and process of defining specific characters in the Lepcha block:

Version	Final code points (Note: Proposed code points and characters names may differ from final code points and names)	Count	UTC ID	L2 ID	WG2 ID	Document
5.1	U+1C00..1C37, 1C3B..1C49, 1C4D..1C4F	74	UTC/1991-101			McGowan, Rick (1991-10-24), Róng (Lepcha) block description and chart draft
5.1	U+1C00..1C37, 1C3B..1C49, 1C4D..1C4F	74		L2/99-067		Everson, Michael (1999-02-11), Lepcha script (RÓNG)
5.1	U+1C00..1C37, 1C3B..1C49, 1C4D..1C4F	74		L2/03-253		Kai, Daniel (2003-08-13), Lepcha, Limbu, Syloti, Saurashtra, Tai Le and Bugis Proposals
5.1	U+1C00..1C37, 1C3B..1C49, 1C4D..1C4F	74		L2/03-259		Kai, Daniel (2003-08-13), Introduction to the Lepcha Script
5.1	U+1C00..1C37, 1C3B..1C49, 1C4D..1C4F	74		L2/04-397		Vikas, Om (2004-10-28), Proposal to encode Lepcha
5.1	U+1C00..1C37, 1C3B..1C49, 1C4D..1C4F	74		L2/05-061R		Everson, Michael (2005-02-04), Analysis of Indian proposal to encode Lepcha script in the UCS
5.1	U+1C00..1C37, 1C3B..1C49, 1C4D..1C4F	74		L2/05-158R	N2947R	Everson, Michael (2005-06-15), Proposal for encoding the Lepcha Script in the BMP of the UCS
5.1	U+1C00..1C37, 1C3B..1C49, 1C4D..1C4F	74		L2/05-180		Moore, Lisa (2005-08-17), "Lepcha (C.1)", UTC #104 Minutes
5.1	U+1C00..1C37, 1C3B..1C49, 1C4D..1C4F	74		L2/05-270		Whistler, Ken (2005-09-21), "I. Lepcha /ng/", WG2 Consent Docket (Sophia Antipolis)
5.1	U+1C00..1C37, 1C3B..1C49, 1C4D..1C4F	74			N2953 (pdf, doc)	Umamaheswaran, V. S. (2006-02-16), "7.4.4", Unconfirmed minutes of WG 2 meeting 47, Sophia Antipolis, France; 2005-09-12/15
5.1	U+1C00..1C37, 1C3B..1C49, 1C4D..1C4F	74		L2/06-220		Letter from Government of Sikkim regarding Lepcha Encoding, 2006-05-12
5.1	U+1C00..1C37, 1C3B..1C49, 1C4D..1C4F	74		L2/06-108		Moore, Lisa (2006-05-25), "Consensus 107-C34", UTC #107 Minutes, "Accept U+1C35 LEPCHA CONSONANT SIGN KANG for encoding in a future version of the standard."
5.1	U+1C00..1C37, 1C3B..1C49, 1C4D..1C4F	74		L2/06-231		Moore, Lisa (2006-08-17), "C.1", UTC #108 Minutes
5.1	U+1C00..1C37, 1C3B..1C49, 1C4D..1C4F	74		L2/11-305		Priest, Lorna A. (2011-07-27), Lepcha Encoding model feedback
