= Mun (religion) =

Traditional religion of the Lepcha people

Mun or Munism (also called Bongthingism) is the traditional polytheistic, animist, shamanistic and syncretic religion of the Lepcha people. It predates the 7th century Lepcha conversion to Lamaistic Buddhism, and since that time, the Lepcha have practiced it together with Buddhism. Since the arrival of Christian missionaries in the nineteenth century, Mun traditions have been followed alongside that religion as well. The traditional religion permits incorporation of Buddha and Jesus Christ as deities, depending on household beliefs.

== Background ==
The exonym "Mun" derives from the traditional belief in spirits called mun or mung. Together with bongthing (also bungthing or bóngthíng), mun comprise a central element in the religion. These terms are also used to describe the shaman priesthood that officiates the respective spirits.

The Mun religion and its priesthood are in decline. Conversion to other religions is attributed to economic pressure, as traditional practices are immensely expensive to the ordinary practitioner. It has, however, regained interest among Lepcha as ecological encroachment becomes a growing concern. The environment is so deeply intertwined with Mun beliefs that religious leaders have offered direct opposition to development in areas including the Rathong Chu and Teesta Rivers.

== Mythology ==
The traditional Lepcha belief system is rich in oral myths, legends, fables, and fairy-tales collectively called lúngten sung.

According to Mun mythology, the ancestors of the Lepcha were created by Itbu Rum, who molded them from the pure snows of mount Kangchenjunga. They thus share a lineage with the natural environment and share the cosmos with non-human spirits.

The spirit of the legendary Thyukung Thek delivers reproaches to the Lepcha chief through mun or bongthing shamans.

== Belief system ==
The belief system of Mun is animist, and the natural environment provides much of its basis. Naturally occurring spirits are an object of ceremonial dedication, and they reside in objects such as trees, rocks, and rivers. It is also a syncretic religion that has coexisted with Mahayana Buddhism since its arrival in the seventh century, with practitioners following both religions at the same time. Traditional beliefs may have influenced Lepcha Buddhist scriptures. Modern religious life in a Lepcha village is centered on the gumpa, or Buddhist monastery.

Many Lepcha were converted to Christianity by Scottish missionaries in the 19th century, however Buddhism and the traditional religion have retained important roles in Lepcha religious life. Many Christian Lepcha who have lost their Lepcha language have also distanced themselves from these traditional aspects of Lepcha religion.

Mun religion includes a belief in heaven, called rumlyang or rum lyaang (from rum "god" and lyaang "land/place").

=== Deities ===
The Mun religion is polytheistic and syncretic: it acknowledges several deities, including those of other religions, namely Buddhism and Christianity.

The chief goddess of the Lepcha religion is Nozyongnyu. The mother-creator is a female earth deity, It Bumoo (also Itbu-moo). Two other female deities are the chief of the mun spirits.

Traditional Lepcha beliefs include deities governing family, clan (or lineage, putsho), village, region, and wider levels. Clan deities may be named after mountain peaks or rivers, while regions are home to deities associated with Kangchenjunga such as Chyu-rum-fat. The current traditional religion also incorporates Buddha and Jesus Christ as a deities, depending on household beliefs.

=== Mun spirits ===
Mun spirits are of two general types: the benevolent, or white magician, taung-li mun, and the malevolent or black magician, called mung-sek mun or mung. The latter reside in trees, bushes, rocks, and rivers. The spirits are further subdivided into seven classes: avor mun, pildon mun, angan mun, tungli mun, munjyum mun, mun mook mun and lyang-eet mun. Mun spirits, and witchcraft, are believed to be the invariable culprit of illness.

== Rituals ==
Ceremonies are usually performed for one or several households, and consist of two parts. The rum portion is an offering to devils. The second, tsandong, is for offerings to the deity Kangchenjunga, to Chyu rum fat, and to the plains. Ceremonies generally seek to appease these spirits. Bongthing rituals generally include prayers, herbs, and amulets, and may also include directed breathing or spitting by the priest. Ritual prayers are sometimes in the form of glossolalia.

Spirit possession is considered to occur in various ways: from a subtle headache to violent, uncontrollable madness. Generally symptoms are the manifestation of mung spirits feeding off the flesh, blood, internal organs, or life energy of the host. Ritual paraphernalia include the ghanta bell, damaru dru necklaces, and consecrated cup filled with chi.

The religion practices animal sacrifice, especially of goats and pigs.

Mun priests are traditionally present at Lepcha celebrations for birth, marriage, and death. Among the Lepcha, Mun officiants are the only obligatory aspect of a commoner's funeral. The funerary ceremony, called dek flee, is accompanied by the sacrifice of a goat and a hen three days after death. It is also performed at the home of people who die elsewhere, for fear of the spirit's return. Auspicious locations and days, particularly in rural settings, may be required of rituals to address more severe ailments or threatening afflictions.

Festivals are also a central aspect of the religion.

== Priesthood ==
The priesthood consists of two types of shaman, corresponding to the spirits they manifest. Mun enter trance, believed to involve spirit possession, manifesting supernatural entities bodily. Spirits can be male or female. The bongthing are only male, where they have to learn and practice rituals. It is said that Bongthing came before Mun, so as to show respect, the Mun needs to learn both the Bongthing way and the Mun way. Their main functions are to ward off misfortunes and illness, perform exorcisms, and guide souls to the afterlife. Some also adjudicate theft cases. Although the priesthood exists, the religion considers true knowledge to be a divine revelation through meditation or dreams, as opposed to a learned talent.

Both the mun and bongthing priesthoods are hereditary . Trained disciples of existing masters are often recruited to service at times of crisis as an election by ancestors or shamanic gods. It is possible for a bongthing to advance to mun status.

Padem are a male hereditary junior priesthood. A padem is usually an initiate on the path to becoming a mun shaman, and has the right to offer sacrifice.

The traditional priesthood also plays a role in the indigenous medical system, as they learn traditional medicine and healing rituals.

== See also ==
- History of Buddhism in India
- Indigenous peoples of Sikkim
- Bon
