= Dumdyam =

Traditional woman's costume of the Lepcha people

Dumdyam, or dumdyám, (also dumdem; Lepcha for "female dress") is the traditional dress of Lepcha women. It is an ankle-length garment, usually made of a single piece of smooth cotton or silk, and of a solid color. When it is worn, it is folded over one shoulder, pinned at the other shoulder, and held in place by a waistband, or tago, over which excess material drapes. A contrasting long-sleeved blouse may be worn underneath. It is modernly worn on ceremonial and festive occasions.

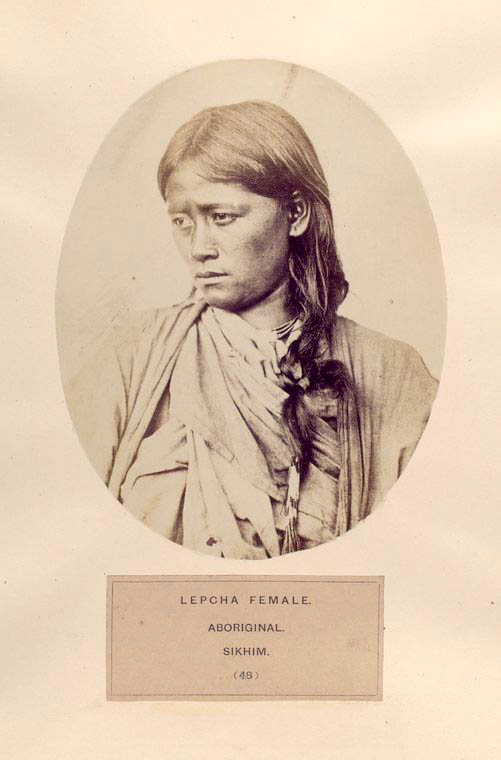
A Lepcha women wearing Dumdyan in 1860s

== See also ==
- Lepcha people
- Dumpra
