= Khye Bumsa =

Khye Bumsa (Wylie: Gyad 'bum bsags) is named in the Sikkimese migration narratives as a 13th-century prince from the Minyak House in Kham in Eastern Tibet. His father Guru Tashi migrated to the Chumbi Valley along with his family and established a kingdom. Khye Bumsa expanded it further by establishing an alliance with the Lepchas in present-day Sikkim. The Chogyal rulers of Sikkim are said to be the descendants of Khye Bumsa.

== Narratives ==
In the Tibetan version of the narrative, Khye Bumsa's father, a crown prince of Minyak, (Note: The name of the father is not mentioned in the sources.) had a divine vision one night instructing him to travel to Sikkim, where his descendants are destined to become rulers. Two further messages appear while the prince is on a pilgrimage in Central Tibet along with his family. During the pilgrimage, the family visit the Sakya region where the ruler is constructing a temple but unable to raise the columns. Khye Bumsa erects the columns with his own strength. The name Gyad ’bum bsags (understood as meaning "the accumulation of 100,000 champions") is given to him in recognition of this feat. He also receives a bride from a noble family of the region.

After receiving multiple signals, the family travels to the Chumbi Valley. They construct a temple at Phari (Wylie: Phag ri) and possibly another at Khambu. After the death of his father, Khye Bumsa travels further south and settles down at Chumbi, where he constructs a house. (Note: The ruins of this house are said to have been present close to the summer palace of the Sikkim kings till the late nineteenth century.) He has a conflict with a Bhutanese wrestler, but defeats him.

After residing for three years in Chumbi, Khye Bumsa and his wife are unable to have children. Bumsa then travels to Sikkim over the Cho La mountains to meet a Lepcha holy man, The Kong Tek (Wylie: Teg kong teg). In the Tibetan version of the narrative, the holy man is described as Guru’i sprul pa, literally, "the emanation of the Guru (Rinpoche)". He is said to live in a bamboo hut, sitting on a throne with a variety of shamanistic garments. With the guru's blessings, the couple have three sons and the guru prophesied that in the future the descendent of this children will unify the Lepcha tribes . After some time, Khye Bumsa travels to Sikkim again to thank the guru. After the meeting, an alliance is established, erected nine stones pillars and sealed with the sacrifice of animals and other rituals with witness as mt. Kanchenjunga .The place where the ritual was performed is said to have been Kabi later known as Kabi lungtshok ( Long Chok meaning long stone erected for worship ), and the day is celebrated as Pang-Lhabsol till today signifies the day of unity between Lepchas and Bhutia.His three sons settle in Sikkim, and the middle son Mi dpon rab eventually has the descendant Phuntsog Namgyal, who becomes the first Chogyal of Sikkim.

The Sikkimese Lepcha narrative tells the same story, but with some significant differences. Khye Bumsa is called zo khe bu by the Lepchas. According to their narrative, Khye Bumsa left his home country with "some men", due to the pressure exerted by the Chinese and Mongols. (This is possibly around 1566.) There is no mention of the Chumbi Valley. But the narrative is aware that Khye Bumsa came to The Kong Tek (spelt ti kung tek) for help with children and returned later to thank him. However The Kong Tek is said to have realized that Khye Bumsa's sons would invade Sikkim. So he made Bumsa and his sons swear, in front of Kanchenjunga, that they would not do so, via a blood ritual.

== Bibliography ==
- Mullard, Saul (2011), Opening the Hidden Land: State Formation and the Construction of Sikkimese History, BRILL, ISBN 978-90-04-20895-7
- Siiger, Halfdan (1967), The Lepchas: Culture and Religion of a Himalayan People, Part I, Copenhagen: The National Museum of Denmark – via archive.org
- Steinmann, Brigitte (2003–2004), "National Hegemonies, Local Allegiances: Historiography and ethnography of a Buddhist kingdom" (PDF), European Bulletin of Himalayan Research, 25/26: 145–167, archived from the original (PDF) on 2024-01-02
