= George Byers Mainwaring =

British Indian army officer and linguist

General George Byers Mainwaring (Note: the middle name is sometimes given as Byres) (18 July 1824 – 16 January 1894) was a British Indian army officer and a linguist. He compiled the first English dictionary of the Lepcha (or Róng) language.

Mainwaring (pronounced "Mannering") was born in Banda in the United Provinces to Bengal civil servant George Mainwaring and his wife Isabella (1800–1872), daughter of Major General Patrick Byers. He was sent to Britain for study and was educated at Mr Tulloch's Academy, Aberdeen and at Messrs. Stoton and Mayor, Wimbledon. He obtained commission in the Bengal army on 8 January 1842. He was posted to the 16th Bengal Native Infantry and saw action in the Battle of Maharajpur, receiving a Gwalior campaign bronze star in 1843. He also received awards for service in the Sutlej campaign (1845–46) and the Battle of Moodki. He went to England in 1854 and returned on 5 November 1857. Because of his fluency in Hindustani, he was posted as an interpreter with the 42nd and 49th Highlanders during the Sepoy Mutiny. He went to England for medical reasons in 1863 and returned in 1866. In 1867 he was appointed by the government to produce a dictionary and grammar of the Lepcha language. He lived in Darjeeling at Lebong and later at Poloongdong. He studied the Lepcha language under a Lepcha priestess who learned some English. Mainwaring was made full colonel in January 1873. He was promoted to Major General in January 1884 and Lieutenant General in 1887. Mainwaring died at Serampore where he is buried.

Mainwaring's A Grammar of the Lepcha (Rong) Language as it exists in the Dorjeling and Sikkim Hills was published in 1876. It was revised by Albert Grunwedel and republished in 1898.
