= Lepcha script =

Abugida used to write the Lepcha language

Lepcha ᰛᰩᰵᰛᰧᰵ
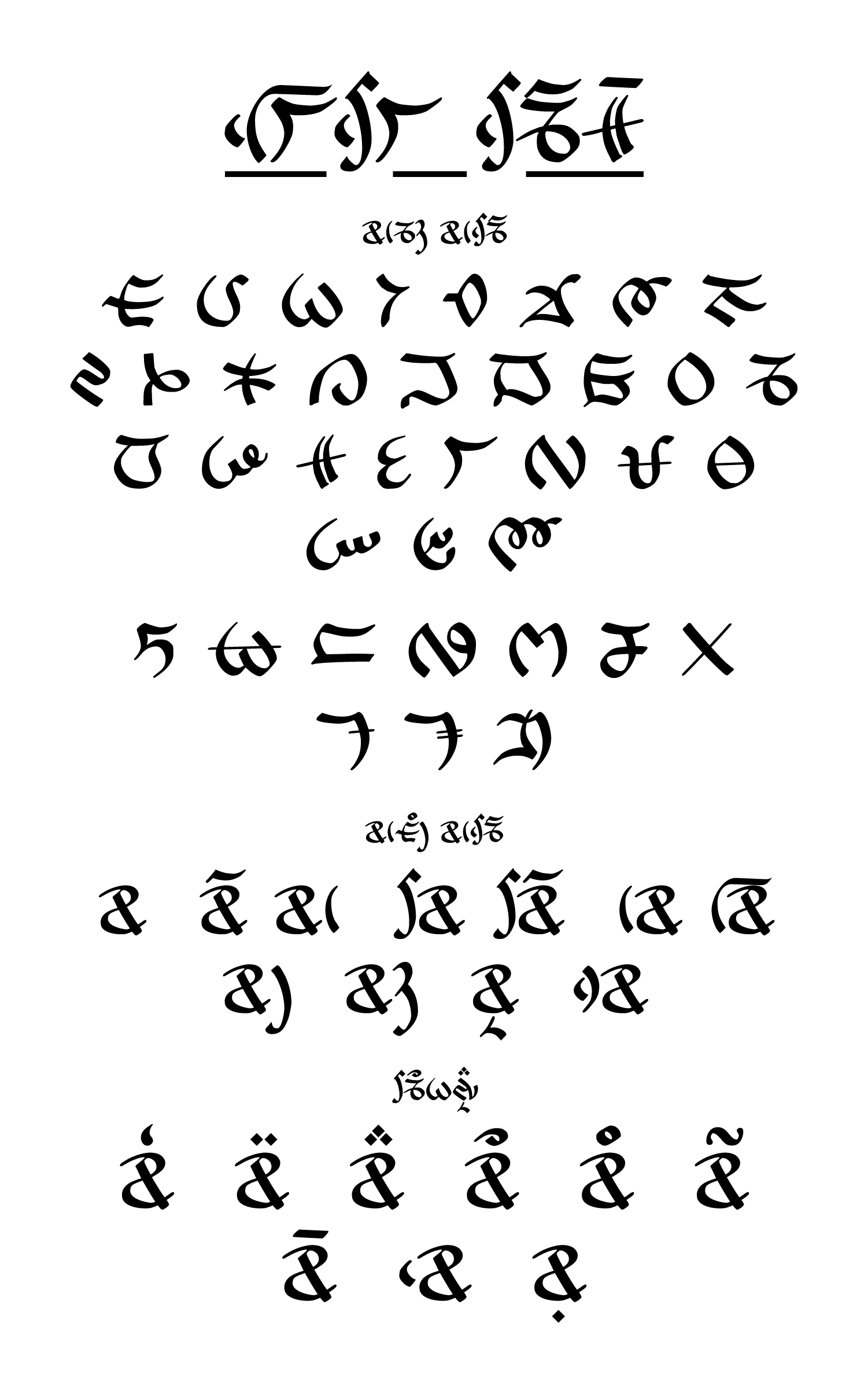
- Lepcha Alphabet chart (Mingzat)
- Script type: Abugida
- Period: c. 1700–present
- Direction: Left-to-right
- Languages: Lepcha

Related scripts
- Parent systems: Egyptian: Proto-Sinaitic; Phoenician; Aramaic; Brahmi; Gupta; Tibetan; Lepcha
- Child systems: Limbu
- Sister systems: Meitei, Khema, Phagspa, Marchen

ISO 15924
- ISO 15924: Lepc (335), Lepcha (Róng)

Unicode
- Unicode alias: Lepcha
- Unicode range: U+1C00–U+1C4F

The Lepcha script, or Róng script, is an abugida used by the Lepcha people to write the Lepcha language. Unusually for an abugida, syllable-final consonants are written as diacritics.

== History ==
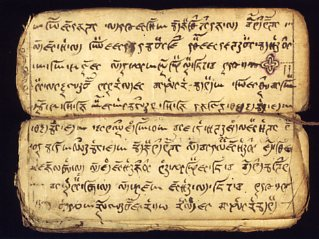
Róng manuscript

Lepcha is derived from the Tibetan script, and may have some Burmese influence. According to tradition, it was devised at the beginning of the 18th century by prince Chakdor Namgyal of the Namgyal dynasty of Sikkim, or by scholar Thikúng Men Salóng in the 17th century. Early Lepcha manuscripts were written in vertical columns from top to bottom. When they were later written horizontally, the letters were reoriented 90° anticlockwise (compared to their Tibetan prototypes) to maintain their alignment with the direction of writing. This resulted in the script's unuusal method of writing final consonants, as conjunct forms (ligatures) became superposed diacritics.

== Typology ==
As in most other Brahmic scripts, the short vowel /-a/ is not written; other vowels are written with diacritics before (/-i, -o/), after (/-ā, -u/), or under (/-e/) the initial consonant. The length mark, however, is written over the initial, as well as any final consonant diacritic, and fuses with /-o/ and /-u/. (When fused as /-ō/, however, it lies below any final consonant.) Initial vowels do not have separate letters, but are written with the vowel diacritics on an &-shaped zero-consonant letter.

There are postposed diacritics for medial /-y-/ and /-r-/, which may be combined (krya). For medial /-l-/, however, there are seven dedicated conjunct letters. That is, there is a special letter for /kla/ which does not resemble the letter for /ka/. (Only /gla/ is written with a straightforward diacritic.)

One of the final letters, /-ŋ/, is an exception to these patterns. First, unlike the other finals, final /-ŋ/ is written to the left of the initial consonant rather than on top, occurring even before preposed vowels. That is, /kiŋ/ is written "ngki". Second, there is no inherent vowel before /-ŋ/: even short /-a-/ must be written, with a diacritic unique to this situation. (It appears to be the diacritic for long /-ā/ rotated 180° around the consonant letter.) That is, /kaŋ/ is written "ngka", rather than "" as would be expected from the general pattern.

== Letters ==
As an abugida, a basic letter represents both a consonant followed by an inherent vowel. In Lepcha, the inherent vowel is /a/. To start a syllable with a vowel, the appropriate vowel diacritic is added to the vowel-carrier ᰣ. A vowel-carrier with no diacritic represents the sound /a/.

=== Consonants ===
Consonants
| ᰀ ka IPA: /ka/ | ᰂ kha IPA: /kʰa/ | ᰃ ga IPA: /ga/ | ᰅ nga IPA: /ŋa/ | |
| ᰆ ca IPA: /ca/ | ᰇ cha IPA: /cʰa/ | ᰈ ja IPA: /dʒa/ | ᰉ nya IPA: /nja/ | |
| ᰊ ta IPA: /ta/ | ᰋ tha IPA: /tʰa/ | ᰌ da IPA: /da/ | ᰍ na IPA: /na/ | |
| ᱍ tta IPA: /ʈa/ | ᱎ ttha IPA: /ʈʰa/ | ᱏ dda IPA: /ɖa/ | | |
| ᰎ pa IPA: /pa/ | ᰐ pha IPA: /pʰa/ | ᰑ fa IPA: /fa/ | ᰓ ba IPA: /ba/ | ᰕ ma IPA: /ma/ |
| ᰗ tsa IPA: /ta/ | ᰘ tsha IPA: /tʃa/ | ᰙ dza IPA: /dˢa/ | | |
| ᰚ ya IPA: /ja/ | ᰛ ra IPA: /ra/ | ᰜ la IPA: /la/ | ᰝ ha IPA: /ha/ | |
| ᰟ va IPA: /va/ | ᰡ sha IPA: /ʃa/ | ᰠ sa IPA: /sa/ | ᰢ wa IPA: /ua/ | |
| ᰁ kla IPA: /kla/ | ᰄ gla IPA: /gla/ | ᰞ hla IPA: /hla/ | | |
| ᰏ pla IPA: /pla/ | ᰒ fla IPA: /fla/ | ᰔ bla IPA: /bla/ | ᰖ mla IPA: /mla/ | |

A consonant cluster can be formed by adding one of the subjoiners to a base letter.

Subjoined Consonants
| y subjoiner ᰤ y | ᰜ + ◌ ᰤ ᰜᰤ lya | r subjoiner ᰥ r | ᰜ + ◌ ᰥ ᰜ ᰥ la |

Final Consonants, their diacritics, and examples
| ᰭ k | ᰮ m | ᰯ l | ᰰ n | ᰱ p | ᰲ r | ᰳ t | ᰴ ng | ᰵ ng |
| ᰜᰭ lak | ᰜᰮ lam | ᰜᰯ lal | ᰜᰰ lan | ᰜᰱ lap | ᰜᰲ lar | ᰜᰳ lat | ᰜᰴ lang (Note: Written as ⟨ᰴ⟩ with an /-a-/ vowel, as in the example. When a vowel diacritic is present, it is written ⟨ᰵ⟩, as in ⟨ᰜᰵᰫ⟩) | ᰜᰵᰫ lúng |

=== Vowels ===
Vowels diacritics, and examples
| | ᰶ â IPA: /ə/ | ᰦ á IPA: /a/ | ᰧ i IPA: /i/ | ᰧ ᰶ í IPA: /i/ | ᰨ o IPA: /o/ | ᰩ ó IPA: /ɔ/ | ᰪ u IPA: /ɯ/ | ᰫ ú IPA: /u/ | ᰬ e/ä IPA: /e~ɛ/ (Note: The transcription 'e' is used in this article.) |
| ᰣ | ᰣᰶ | ᰣᰦ | ᰣᰧ | ᰣᰧᰶ | ᰣᰨ | ᰣᰩ | ᰣᰪ | ᰣᰫ | ᰣᰬ |
| ᰜ la | ᰜᰶ lâ | ᰜᰦ lá | ᰜᰧ li | ᰜᰧᰶ lí | ᰜᰨ lo | ᰜᰩ ló | ᰜᰪ lu | ᰜᰫ lú | ᰜᰬ le |

== Numerals ==
Lepcha numerals
| 0 ᱀ | 1 ᱁ | 2 ᱂ | 3 ᱃ | 4 ᱄ | 5 ᱅ | 6 ᱆ | 7 ᱇ | 8 ᱈ | 9 ᱉ |

== Unicode ==
Lepcha script was added to the Unicode Standard in April, 2008 with the release of version 5.1.

The Unicode block for Lepcha is U+1C00–U+1C4F:

Lepcha^{[1]}^{[2]} Official Unicode Consortium code chart (PDF)
| | 0 | 1 | 2 | 3 | 4 | 5 | 6 | 7 | 8 | 9 | A | B | C | D | E | F |
| U+1C0x | ᰀ | ᰁ | ᰂ | ᰃ | ᰄ | ᰅ | ᰆ | ᰇ | ᰈ | ᰉ | ᰊ | ᰋ | ᰌ | ᰍ | ᰎ | ᰏ |
| U+1C1x | ᰐ | ᰑ | ᰒ | ᰓ | ᰔ | ᰕ | ᰖ | ᰗ | ᰘ | ᰙ | ᰚ | ᰛ | ᰜ | ᰝ | ᰞ | ᰟ |
| U+1C2x | ᰠ | ᰡ | ᰢ | ᰣ | ᰤ | ᰥ | ᰦ | ᰧ | ᰨ | ᰩ | ᰪ | ᰫ | ᰬ | ᰭ | ᰮ | ᰯ |
| U+1C3x | ᰰ | ᰱ | ᰲ | ᰳ | ᰴ | ᰵ | ᰶ | ᰷ | | | | ᰻ | ᰼ | ᰽ | ᰾ | ᰿ |
| U+1C4x | ᱀ | ᱁ | ᱂ | ᱃ | ᱄ | ᱅ | ᱆ | ᱇ | ᱈ | ᱉ | | | | ᱍ | ᱎ | ᱏ |
Notes 1.As of Unicode version 18.0 2.Grey areas indicate non-assigned code points
