= Sittong =

Sittong Sittong Khas Mahal
- Village
- Location in West Bengal, India Sittong (India)
- Coordinates: 26.937°N 88.367°E
- Country: India
- State: West Bengal
- District: Darjeeling

Population (2011)
  - Total: 3,098
- Time zone: UTC+5:30 (IST)
- Lok Sabha constituency: Darjeeling
- Vidhan Sabha constituency: Kurseong
- Website: darjeeling.gov.in

Sittong (Valley) is a village in the Kurseong CD block in the Kurseong subdivision of the Darjeeling district in the state of West Bengal, India.

== Geography ==
Places and tea estates in the north-eastern portion of Darjeeling Sadar subdivision (including Rangli Rangliot CD block) and Kurseong subdivision in Darjeeling district
CT: census town, R: rural/ urban centre, N: neighbourhood, H: hill centre, NP: national park/ wildlife sanctuary, TE: tea estate, TA: tourist attraction
Abbreviations used in names – TG for Tea Garden (town/village), TE for Tea Estate
Owing to space constraints in the small map, the actual locations in a larger map may vary slightly

=== Location ===
Sittong is located at 26.93662°N 88.36736°E. Sittong is a village in the heart of Darjeeling's orange growing area. It is in the Riyang river valley. Mangpu is 20 km and Mahananda Wildlife Sanctuary is 13 km.

=== Area overview ===
The map alongside shows the eastern portion of the Darjeeling Himalayan hill region and a small portion of the terai region in its eastern and southern fringes, all of it in the Darjeeling district. In the Darjeeling Sadar subdivision 61.00% of the total population lives in the rural areas and 39.00% of the population lives in the urban areas. In the Kurseong subdivision 58.41% of the total population lives in the rural areas and 41.59% lives in the urban areas. There are 78 tea gardens/ estates (the figure varies slightly according to different sources), in the district, producing and largely exporting Darjeeling tea. It engages a large proportion of the population directly/ indirectly. Some tea gardens were identified in the 2011 census as census towns or villages. Such places are marked in the map as CT (census town) or R (rural/ urban centre). Specific tea estate pages are marked TE.

Note: The map alongside presents some of the notable locations in the subdivision. All places marked in the map are linked in the larger full screen map.

== Demographics ==
According to the 2011 Census of India, Sittong Khasmahal had a total population of 3.098 of which 1,626 (52%) were males and 1,472 (48%) were females. There are 317 persons in the age range of 0 to 6 years. The total number of literate people in Sittong Khas Mahal was 2,259 (72.92% of the population over 6 years).

== Tourism ==
Sittong is a very popular tourist destination, particularly in the late winter/early summer when it is called orange village because it's the season in which oranges grow there. Every year, the Directorate of Cinchona and Other Medicinal Plants Government of West Bengal organizes the Orange Festival in the month of December. This event featured seminars and demonstrations highlighting modern cultivation methods. Apart from agriculture, the festival celebrated local culture with various performances by the locals. This festival is crucial in supporting the region's orange farming community and ensuring an endurable future for Darjeeling Mandarin Orange cultivation. Thousands of travelers gather during this time in this small village to witness this spectacular event.
