= Lepcha people =

Ethnic group of India, Nepal, and Bhutan

Lepcha, Róng ᰕᰫ་ᰊᰪᰰ་ᰆᰧᰶ ᰛᰩᰵ་ᰀᰪᰱ ᰛᰪᰮ་ᰀᰪᰱ
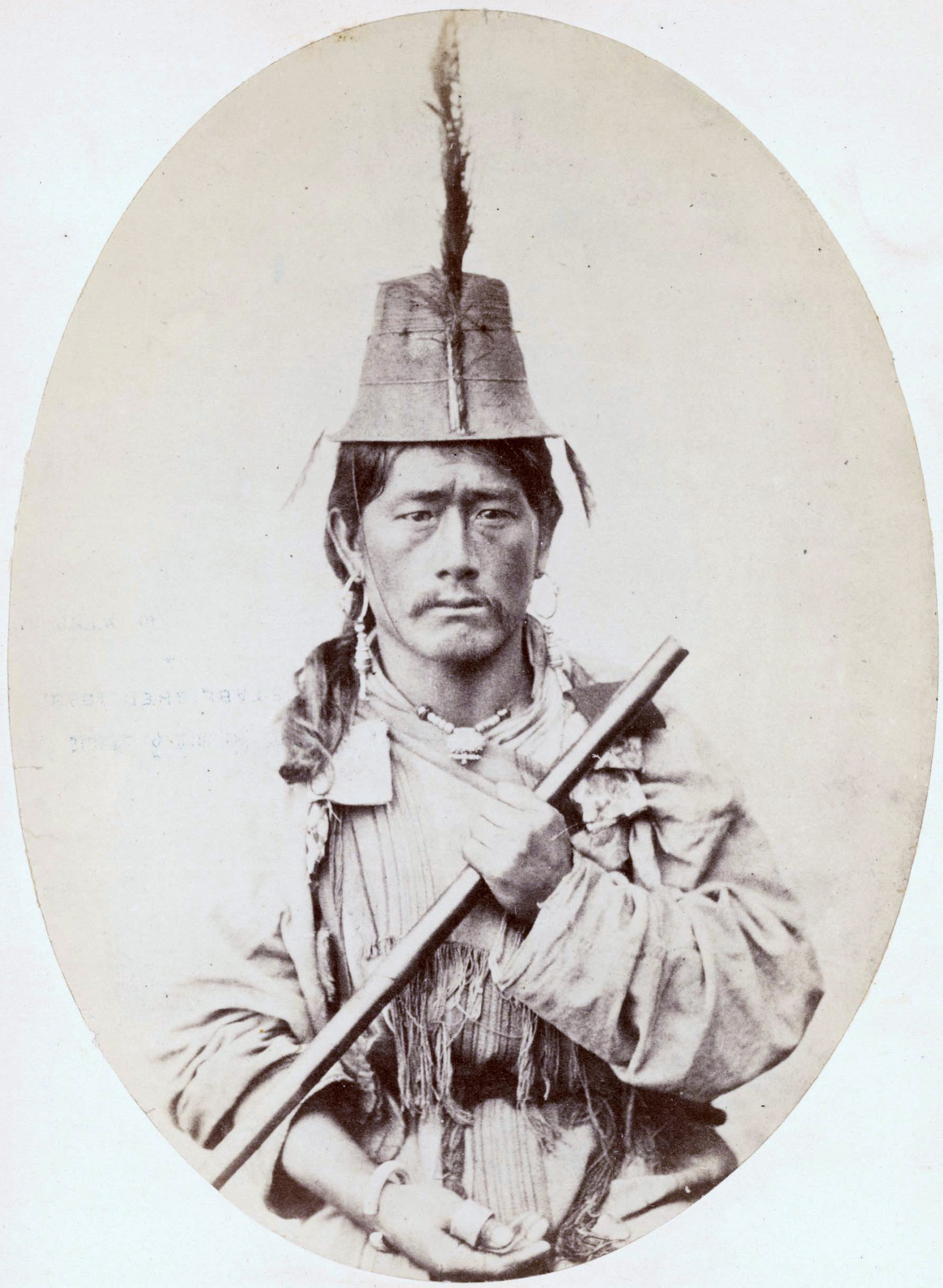
- A Lepcha man in 1868

Total population
- 80,316 (2011)

Regions with significant populations
- India (Sikkim, Darjeeling and Kalimpong districts, West Bengal: 76,871 (2011 census)
- Nepal (Ilam District, Panchthar District and Taplejung District): 3578 (2021census)
- Bhutan (Samtse and Chukha districts): N/A
- China (Tibet region): N/A

Languages
- Lepcha, Sikkimese (Dranjongke), Dzongkha, Nepali

Religion
- Majority: Buddhism; Minority: Mun; Christianity; Islam

Related ethnic groups
- Bhutia, Limbu, Lhop, Other Sino-Tibetan people

The Lepcha (/ˈlɛptʃə/; also called Rongkup (Lepcha: ᰕᰫ་ᰊᰪᰰ་ᰆᰧᰶ ᰛᰩᰵ་ᰀᰪᰱ ᰛᰪᰮ་ᰀᰪᰱ, Mútuncí Róngkup Rumkup, "beloved children of the Róng and of God") and Rongpa (Sikkimese: རོང་པ)) are among the indigenous people of the Indian state of Sikkim as well as the bordering Darjeeling and Kalimpong in the state of West Bengal, and in the neighbouring country of Nepal. They number around 80,000. Many Lepcha are also found in western and southwestern Bhutan, Darjeeling, the Koshi Province of eastern Nepal, and in the hills of West Bengal. The Lepcha people are composed of four main distinct communities: the Renjóngmú of Sikkim; the Dámsángmú of Kalimpong, Kurseong, and Mirik; the ʔilámmú of Ilam District, Nepal; and the Promú of Samtse and Chukha in southwestern Bhutan.

== Origins ==
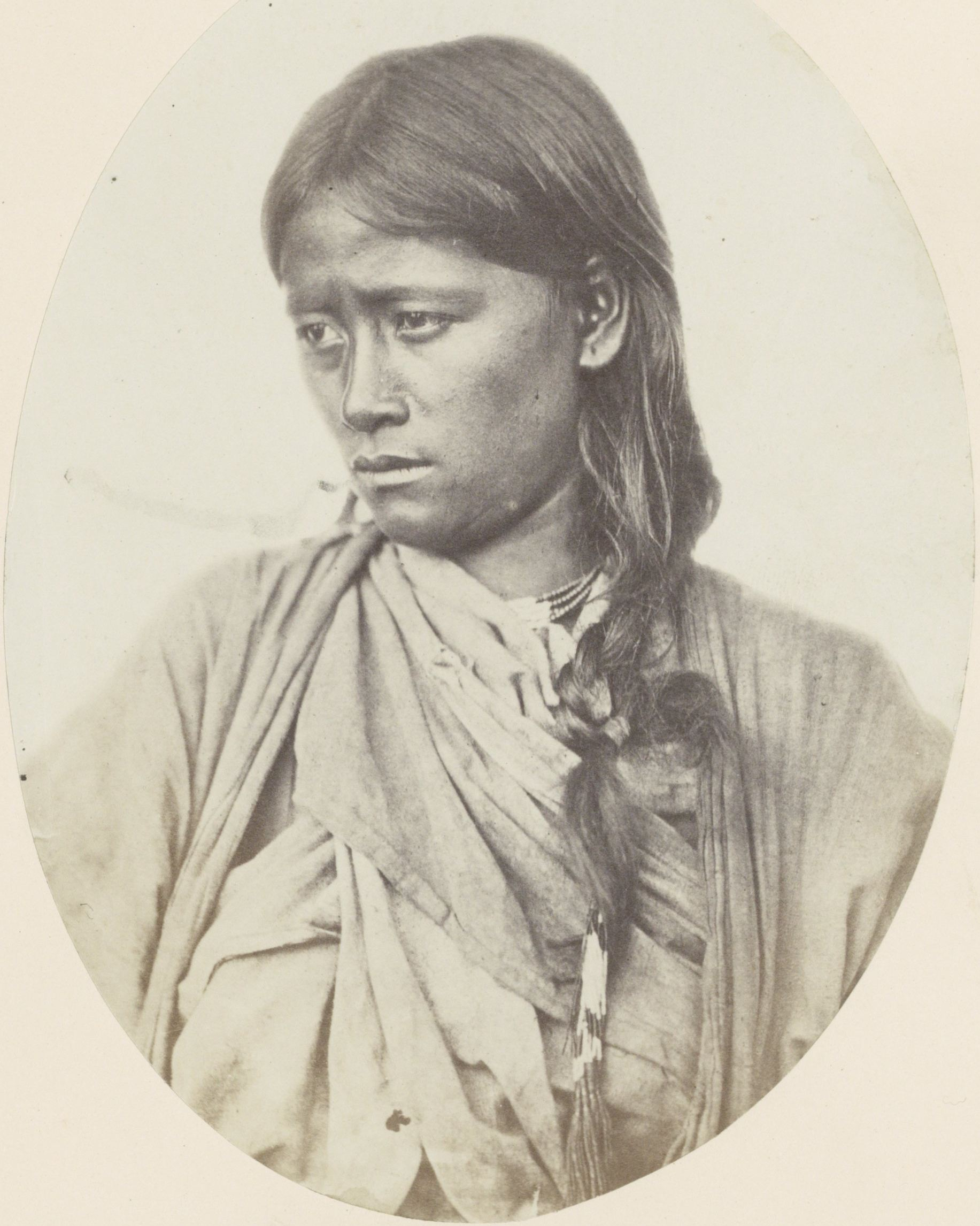
A Lepcha woman in the 1860s

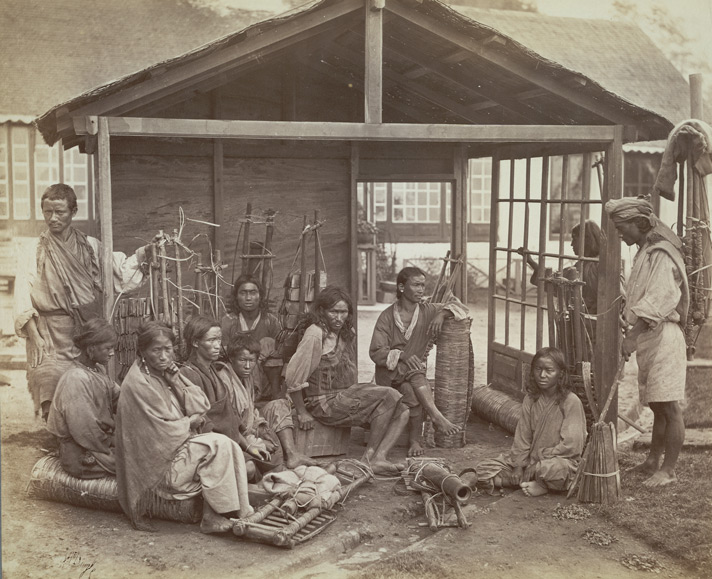
A group of Lepcha shingle cutters at Darjeeling in the 1870s

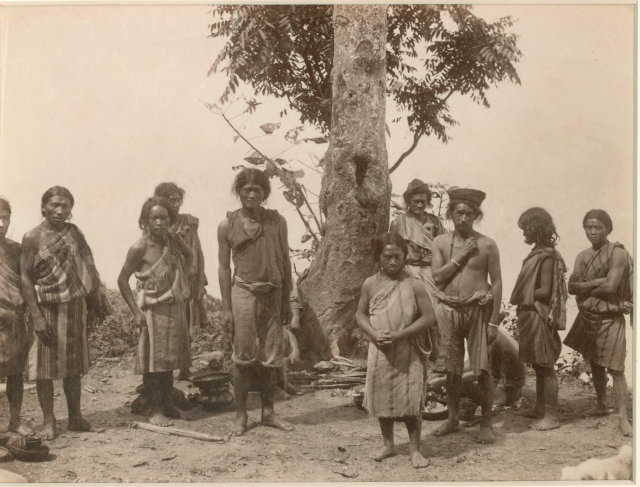
A group of Lepchas in Darjeeling (circa 1880)

Lepchas are said to have migrated from Cambodia and Tibet having a similar culture, attire, traits and history. They speak a Tibeto-Burman language which some classify as Himalayish. Others suggest a more complex migration, a migration to Cambodia, then a navigation of the Ayeyarwady River and Chindwin rivers, a crossing of the Patkoi range coming back west, and finally entering ancient India; this idea is supported by Austroasiatic language substrata in their vocabularies. While migrating westward through India, they are surmised to have passed through southern Bhutan before reaching their final destination near Kanchenjunga. The Lepcha people themselves do not have any tradition of migration, and hence they conclude that they are autochthonous to the region, currently falling under the state of Sikkim, Darjeeling District of West Bengal, eastern Nepal and the southwestern parts of Bhutan. In the Koshi Province of Nepal, they form 7% of the population of Ilam District, 2% in Panchthar District, and 10% of the population in Taplejung District. In India's Sikkim as a whole they are considered to be around 15% of the population of the state.

The Lepcha people were earlier ruled by Pano (King) Gaeboo Achyok. Gaeboo Achyok was instrumental in uniting the Lepcha people and to honour him, the Lepcha people celebrate 20 December of every year as Gaeboo Achyok celebrations day. Gaeboo Achyok extended the Lepcha kingdom from Bhutan in the east to Ilam (Nepal) in the west and from Sikkim to the northern tips of present-day Bangladesh.

== Language ==
The Lepcha have their own language, also called Lepcha. It belongs to the Bodish–Himalayish group of Tibeto-Burman languages. The Lepcha write their language in their own script, called Róng or Lepcha script, which is derived from the Tibetan script. It was developed between the 17th and 18th centuries, possibly by a Lepcha scholar named Thikúng Munsulóng, during the reign of the third Chogyal (Tibetan king) of Sikkim.

== Clans ==
Lepchas are divided into many clans (Lepcha: putsho), each of which reveres its own sacred lake and mountain peak (Lepcha: dâ and cú) from which the clan derives its name. While most Lepcha can identify their own clan, Lepcha clan names can be quite formidable, and are often shortened for this reason. For example, Nāmchumú, Simíkmú, and Fonyung Rumsóngmú may be shortened to Namchu, Simik, and Foning, respectively. Some of the name of the clans are "Barphungputso", "Rongong", "Karthakmu", " Zurabu", "Sungutmu", "Phipon", "Brimu", "Lickchingmu ", “Sadamoo”, “Kabomoo”, “Molomoo”, “Lingdamoo” etc.

== Religion ==
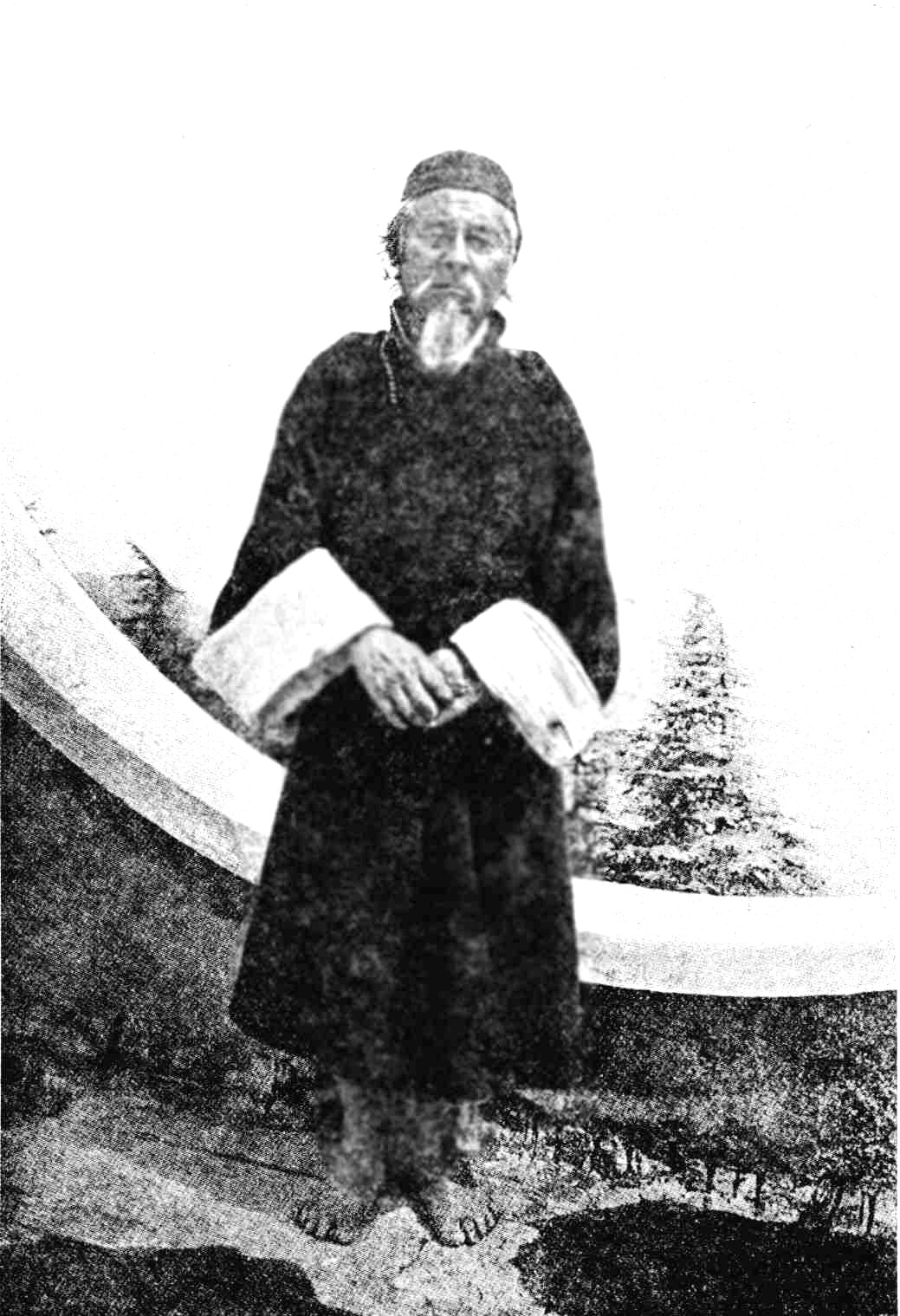
Kinthup, a noted Lepcha Pundit, was a Buddhist pilgrim when he surveyed Nepal in the 1870s (photograph 1914).

Most Lepchas are Buddhists, although a large number of Lepchas have today adopted Christianity. Some Lepchas have not given up their shamanistic religion, which is known as Mun. In practice, rituals from Mun and Buddhism are frequently observed alongside one another among some Lepchas. For example, ancestral mountain peaks are regularly honoured in ceremonies called tandong lho rumfát. Many rituals involve local species. In Sikkim, Lepchas are known to use over 370 species of animals, fungi, and plants. According to the Nepal Census of 2001, out of the 3,660 Lepcha in Nepal, 88.80% were Buddhists and 7.62% were Hindus. Many Lepchas in the Hills of Sikkim, Darjeeling and Kalimpong are Christians.

== Clothing ==
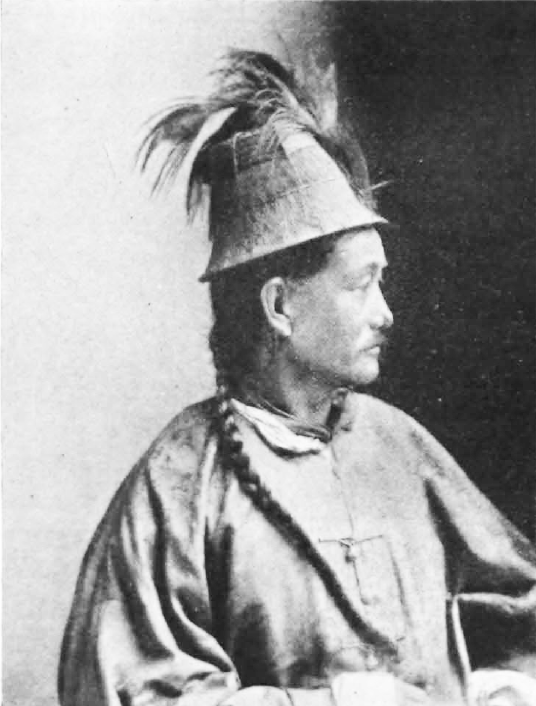
Photograph of a Lepcha c. 1900, wearing the traditional cone-shaped hat

The traditional clothing for Lepcha women is the ankle-length dumvun, also called dumdyám or gādā ("female dress"). It is one large piece of smooth cotton or silk, usually of a solid color. When it is worn, it is folded over one shoulder, pinned at the other shoulder, and held in place by a waistband, or tago, over which excess material drapes. A contrasting long-sleeved blouse may be worn underneath.

The traditional Lepcha clothing for men is the thakraw ("male dress"). It is a multicolored, hand-woven cloth pinned at one shoulder and held in place by a waistband, usually worn over white shirt and trousers. Men wear a flat round cap called a thyáktuk, with stiff black velvet sides and a multicolored top topped by a knot similar as the Mongol's. Rarely, the traditional cone-shaped bamboo and rattan hats are worn.

== Dwellings (place to stay) ==
Traditionally, the Lepcha live in a local house called a li. A traditional home is made out of logs of wood and bamboo and rests around 4 to 5 feet (1.2m to 1.5m) above the ground on stilts. The wooden house with thatched roof is natural air conditioner and eco-friendly. The traditional Lepcha house has no nails used in the construction and it is seismic movement friendly since the weight of the house is rested over a large tablets of stones and not planted on the soil.

== Subsistence ==
The Lepchas are mostly agriculturists. They grow oranges, rice, cardamoms, and other foods.

=== Cuisine ===
Lepcha cuisine is mild and not as spicy as Indian or Nepalese cuisine. Rice is the staple, whole wheat, maize, and buckwheat are also used. Fresh fruit and vegetables are used. Khuzom is a traditional Lepcha bread made from buckwheat, millet, and corn or wheat flour. Popular Lepcha dishes include ponguzom (rice, fish, vegetable grill), su zom (baked meat dish), ihukpa (noodle, meat, and vegetable stew), and sorongbeetuluk (rice and nettle porridge).

An alcoholic beverage called chi or chhaang is fermented from millet. Chi also has religious significance, as it is given as offering to the gods during religious ceremonies.

== Arts, crafts, and music ==
The Lepchas are known for their unique weaving and basketry skills. They have a rich tradition of dances, songs, and folktales. The popular Lepcha folk dances are Zo-Mal-Lok, Chu-Faat, Tendong Lo Rum Faat, and Kinchum-Chu-Bomsa. Musical instruments used are sanga (drum), yangjey (string instrument), fungal, yarka, flute, and tungbuk. One popular instrument used by the Lepchas is a four-string lute that is played with a bow.

== Marriage customs ==
The Lepcha are largely an endogamous community.

The Lepcha trace their descent patrilineally. The marriage is negotiated between the families of the bride and the groom. If the marriage deal is settled, the lama checks the horoscopes of the boy and girl to schedule a favourable date for the wedding. Then the boy's maternal uncle, along with other relatives, approaches the girl's maternal uncle with a khada, a ceremonial scarf, and one rupee, to gain the maternal uncle's formal consent.

The wedding takes place at noon on the auspicious day. The groom and his entire family leave for the girl's house with some money and other gifts that are handed over to the bride's maternal uncle. Upon reaching the destination, the traditional Nyomchok ceremony takes place, and the bride's father arranges a feast for relatives and friends. This seals the marriage between the couple.

== Lepcha people in Nepal ==
The Central Bureau of Statistics of Nepal classifies the Lepcha as a subgroup within the broader social group of Mountain/Hill Janajati. At the time of the 2011 Nepal census, 3,445 people identified as Lepcha, one in every 7,690 of the total Nepalese population (26,494,504).

== See also ==
- Ethnic groups in Bhutan
- Ethnic groups in Nepal
- Indigenous peoples of Sikkim
- Lepcha language
- Lepcha script
