= Lepcha language =

Tibeto-Burman language of Sikkim, Nepal and Bhutan

Lepcha
- ᰛᰩᰵᰛᰧᰵᰶ Róng ríng
- The word 'Róng ríng' written in Lepcha (Róng) Script
- Region: Sikkim, India; parts of Nepal and Bhutan
- Native speakers: 66,500 (2011-2013)
- Language family: Sino-Tibetan: Tibeto-Burman; Lepcha
- Writing system: Lepcha script Tibetan script

Official status
- Official language in: India: Sikkim

Language codes
- ISO 639-3: lep
- Glottolog: lepc1244
- ELP: Lepcha

Lepcha, also called Róng (Lepcha: ᰛᰩᰵᰛᰧᰵᰶ; Róng ríng), is a Tibeto-Burman language spoken by the Lepcha people in Sikkim, India and parts of West Bengal, Nepal, and Bhutan.

== Population ==
Lepcha is spoken by minorities in the Indian states of Sikkim and West Bengal, as well as parts of Nepal and Bhutan. Where it is spoken, it is considered an aboriginal language, predating the arrival of the Tibetan languages (Sikkimese, Dzongkha, and others) and more recent Nepali language. Lepcha speakers comprise four distinct communities: the Renjóngmú of Sikkim; the Támsángmú of Kalimpong, Kurseong, and Mirik; the ʔilámmú of Ilam District, Nepal; and the Promú of southwestern Bhutan. Lepcha-speaking groups in India are larger than those in Nepal and Bhutan.

The Indian census reported 50,000 Lepcha speakers, but the number of native Lepcha speakers in India may be closer to 30,000.

=== Endangerment ===
Since the 1650s, Lepcha has been an endangered language due to the encroachment on Lepcha spheres of life by Tibetan and later Nepali. By 1951, 72% of Lepchas were bilingual in Lepcha and Nepali, the latter of which had become the community's lingua franca. No monolingual Lepcha speakers were recorded, and 20% of Lepchas could speak only Nepali. Transmission of Lepcha to younger generations has been hindered by primary schools teaching exclusively in Nepali, leading to Lepcha only being learned later in life.

Marriages into Nepali-speaking families, central government promotion of Hindi, and increasing interest in English among younger generations have also been cited as significant pressures against Lepcha.

== Classification ==
Lepcha is difficult to classify, but George van Driem (2001) suggests that it may be closest to the Mahakiranti languages, a subfamily of the Himalayish languages.

Lepcha is internally diverse, showing lexical influences from different majority language groups across the four main Lepcha communities. According to Plaisier (2007), these Nepali and Sikkimese Tibetan influences do not amount to a dialectal difference.

Roger Blench (2013) suggests that Lepcha has an Austroasiatic substratum, which originated from a now-extinct branch of Austroasiatic that he calls "Rongic".

== Features ==
Lepcha is a non-tonal Sino-Tibetan language, although it does have phonemic stress or pitch that may be marked in the Lepcha script. Much of its lexicon is composed of monosyllabic elements.

Notably, words that are commonly considered obscene or taboo in other languages are not treated as such by native speakers.

== Script and romanization ==
The Lepcha script is a syllabic script featuring a variety of special marks and ligatures. Its genealogy is unclear. Early Lepcha manuscripts were written vertically, a sign of Chinese influence. Prior to the development of the Lepcha script, Lepcha literary works were composed in the Tibetan script.

Lepcha language is romanized according to varying schemes, the prevailing system being that of Mainwaring (1876). Most linguists, including Plaisier (2007), whose system is used in this article, have followed modified versions of Mainwaring's system. Other linguists and historians have used systems based on European languages such as English, French, and German.

== Phonology ==
=== Consonants ===
Lepcha consonants appear in the chart below, following Plaisier (2007):

		Labial	Dental	Alveolar	Retroflex	Palato- alveolar	Palatal	Velar	Glottal
Nasal		m ⟨m⟩	n ⟨n⟩				ɲ ⟨ny⟩	ŋ ⟨ng⟩	
Plosive	voiceless	p ⟨p⟩	t ⟨t⟩		ʈ ⟨tr⟩		c ⟨c⟩	k ⟨k⟩	ʔ ⟨ʔ⟩
Plosive	aspirated	pʰ ⟨ph⟩	tʰ ⟨th⟩		ʈʰ ⟨thr⟩		cʰ ⟨ch⟩	kʰ ⟨kh⟩	
Plosive	voiced	b ⟨b⟩	d ⟨d⟩		ɖ ⟨dr⟩			ɡ ⟨g⟩	
Affricate	voiceless			ts ⟨ts⟩					
Affricate	aspirated			tsʰ ⟨tsh⟩					
Affricate	voiced			z~dz ⟨z⟩					
Fricative	voiced	v ⟨v⟩		z~dz ⟨z⟩		ʒ ⟨j⟩			
Fricative	voiceless	f ⟨f⟩		s ⟨s⟩		ʃ ⟨sh⟩			
Approximant		w ⟨w⟩	l ⟨l⟩				j ⟨y⟩		h ⟨h⟩
Trill				r ⟨r⟩					

Retroflex phonemes /ʈ/, /ʈʰ/, and /ɖ/ are written in Lepcha script as ᰀᰥ kr, ᰝᰥ hr, and ᰃᰥ gr, respectively. Most, though not all, instances of retroflex consonants indicate a word is of Tibetan origin. To distinguish this retroflex sound in Lepcha script, a dot may be written underneath: ᰀᰥ᰷, ᰝᰥ᰷, and ᰃᰥ᰷. Native instances of non-retroflex ᰀᰥ kr, ᰝᰥ hr, and ᰃᰥ gr may either be pronounced as written or as ⟨tr⟩, ⟨thr⟩, and ⟨dr⟩. For example, tagrikup, 'boy', may be said either [ta ɡri kɯʔp̚] or [ta ɖi kɯʔp̚].

Lepcha has three glide consonants that may occur after certain initial consonants: /r/, /j/, and /l/. When the phoneme /r/ operates as a glide, it can combine with /j/ as a double-glide: ᰕᰥᰤᰩᰮ mryóm, 'to spread over the ground, creep'. Notably, syllables with the glide /l/ are given their own independent forms in the Lepcha script.

Velar consonants /k/ and /ɡ/ preceding front vowels /i/ or /e/ are palatalized as [kʲ] and [ɡʲ], respectively. Fricatives /s/ and /ʃ/ are merged before /i/.

Lepcha speakers tend not to distinguish between /z/ and /ʒ/, pronouncing both as [z]~[dz]~[ʒ]. Additionally, initial /ŋ/ is occasionally realized as [ɦ]. Under the influence of Nepali, some Lepcha speakers have lost the distinction between /pʰ/ and /f/, and between /v/ and /w/.

Of the above phonemes, only /m/, /n/, /ŋ/, /k/, /t/, /p/, /r/, and /l/ may be syllable-final. Native speakers tend to neutralize the difference between final /n/ and /ŋ/. In syllable-final position, stops are realized as an unreleased stop, usually pronounced with a simultaneous /ʔ/: for example, /k/ becomes [ʔk̚].

=== Vowels ===
According to Plaisier (2007), Lepcha has eight vowels:

	Front	Central	Back	
	Unrounded			Rounded
Close	i ⟨i⟩, ⟨í⟩		ɯ ⟨u⟩	u ⟨ú⟩
Close-mid	e~ɛ ⟨e⟩			o ⟨o⟩
Mid	e~ɛ ⟨e⟩	ə ⟨a⟩, ⟨â⟩		
Open-mid	e~ɛ ⟨e⟩			ɔ ⟨ó⟩
Open		a ⟨á⟩		

The phoneme denoted by ⟨í⟩ is shortened and appears in closed syllables; ⟨i⟩ is longer and appears in open syllables. The phoneme /e/ is realized as [e] in open syllables and in closed syllables before /ŋ/ or /k/. Closed syllables ending in /p/, /m/, /l/, /n/, /r/, and /t/ show free variation between [e], [ɛ], and even [ɪ]. Distinctions between /o/ and /ɔ/ are often lost among non-literate speakers, particularly those highly fluent in Nepali language, which does not contrast the sounds.

== Grammar ==
Lepcha grammar features nouns, pronouns, adjectives, adverbs, and verbs. Word order is typically subject–object–verb (SOV). Lepcha morphology is somewhat agglutinative, though most bare Lepcha lexicon is made up of one- or two-syllable words. Nouns are arranged into either head-first or head-last noun phrases. Relative clauses and genitive phrases precede nouns, whereas markers for demonstratives, definiteness, number, case, and other particles follow the noun. Lepcha is an ergative language, where the ergative case indicates transitivity and completedness of the event. There is no grammatical agreement between different parts of speech (i.e. verb conjugation). Adjectives follow nouns they modify, function as predicates, or stand independently as nominal heads. Adverbs generally directly precede verbs, and reduplication is generally productive for adverbs of time (e.g. nám 'year' → nám-nám 'yearly').

=== Syntax ===
Some basics of Lepcha syntax are outlined in Mainwaring (1876).

The basic word order in Lepcha is subject–object–verb. Adjectives follow the noun they modify.

Possessors precede the nouns they possess.

=== Nouns ===
According to Plaisier (2007), Lepcha has only two true "cases" that modify the noun morphologically: the definite article -re and the dative case marker -m. All other noun markers, including for example the genitive marker, are actually invariable postpositions. A series noun markers may follow a single noun. Together, these cases and postpositions are:

Postposition	Meaning
-ᰠᰴ -sang	human plural
-ᰎᰴ -pong	non-human plural
-ᰛᰬ -re	definite, topic
-ᰍᰪ/-ᰍᰪᰰ -nu/nun	ergative, ablative
ᰮ -m	dative
-ᰠᰦ -sá	genitive
-ᰀᰦ -ká	locative
-ᰕᰪ -mu	only
-ᰉᰬᰳ -nyet	both

Plurals are marked differently according to whether they are human (-sang) or non-human (-pong) nouns. Notably, the plural is not used when the noun is followed by a number.

According to Plaisier (2007), Lepcha personal pronouns are as follows:

	Singular (Oblique)	Dual	Plural
First person	ᰃᰨ go (ᰀᰠᰪ kasu)	ᰀᰦᰉᰧᰶ kányí	ᰀᰦᰚᰫ káyú
Second person	ᰝᰩ hó (ᰣᰦᰌᰨ ʔádo)	ᰣᰦᰉᰧᰶ ʔányí	ᰣᰦᰚᰫ ʔáyú
Third person	ᰝᰪ hu (ᰝᰪᰌᰨ hudo)	ᰝᰪᰉᰧᰶ hunyí	ᰝᰪᰚᰫ huyú

Oblique forms appear in parentheses above. Lepcha personal pronouns can refer only to humans; otherwise demonstratives are used. Personal pronouns may take the definite article -re.

==== Thematic classes ====
Many Lepcha nouns can be grouped into one of several classes based on associated characteristics. For example, many animal names begin with the Lepcha script syllabic ⟨sâ⟩, e.g., ᰠᰲᰶ sâr 'goat', ᰠᰶᰛᰤᰨᰮ sâryom 'otter', ᰠᰶᰜᰩᰭ sâlók 'rhinoceros', and ᰠᰝᰪ sâhu 'monkey'. Other noun classes include ⟨sâ⟩ and ⟨ka⟩ for plants, and ⟨pe⟩ or ⟨pâ⟩ for snakes and bamboo products.

=== Verbs ===
Lepcha verbs generally function as predicates or, in relative clauses, as modifiers before a head-noun. Verbs may also be nominalized by a combination of suffixes. For example, zo 'eat' may be suffixed to produce zo-shang-re 'eating'.

Many intransitive verbs incorporate a causative -y- infix, sometimes followed by a -t suffix, to take a transitive sense:

- ᰕᰦᰭ mák 'die' → ᰕᰤᰦᰭ myák 'kill';
- ᰏᰶ plâ 'come forth' → ᰏᰤᰶ plyâ 'bring forth';
- ᰄᰫ glú 'fall down' → ᰄᰤᰳ/ᰄᰤᰬᰳ glyat/glyet 'drop'.

Verbs are followed by grammatical suffixes and particles. Verbal particles indicating sureness, polite requests, authoritativeness, dubiousness, and other nonlexical information follow clauses. Below is a chart of such verb- and clause-final suffixes and particles largely following Plaisier (2007):

Suffix or Particle	Meaning
-wám/-ʔám/-bám	progressive
-tho	exhaustive
-hát	perfective
-shang	infinitive
-bú	factual
-re	definite
nón	resultant
ká	adhortative
gó	question
le	polite request
ma	assertive
ce	authoritative
te	dubiousness
pá	certainty
lyók	inference

Verbs are negated by a circumfix, ma-⟩...⟨-n(e), e.g., khut 'to be able' becomes ma-khut-ne 'to be unable'.

== Vocabulary ==
These are some sample words published in Renato Figuerido's Lepcha dictionary.

English	Lepcha (Latin)	Lepcha (Róng/Lepcha script)
Lady	Ku-mo	ᰀᰪᰕᰨ
Let	kón	ᰀᰩᰰ
Proceed	Dí	ᰌᰧᰶ
Reach a height	Thók	ᰋᰩᰭ
Riverbank	Klóp	ᰁᰩᰱ
A cut	Mó	ᰕᰩ
To pull	Krút	ᰀᰥᰫᰳ
Go	Nóng	ᰍᰩᰵ
Flabby	Thyor	ᰋᰤᰨᰲ
Reflective Light	Lóng	ᰜᰩᰵ
Palm	Lyók	ᰜᰤᰩᰭ
To be short	Tan	ᰊᰰ
Meat	Ke-rung	ᰀᰬᰛᰪᰵ
Overclouded	Muk	ᰕᰪᰭ
What comes first	Ták	ᰊᰦᰭ
Mother	A-mo	ᰣᰕᰨ
To knot	Tyep	ᰊᰤᰬᰱ
A spec of Sterculia	Ke-hlyám kun	ᰀᰬᰞᰤᰮ ᰀᰪᰰ
Be on strong legs	Krang	ᰀᰥᰴ
Dirt	Me-ri	ᰕᰬᰛᰧ
To slice	Líp	ᰜᰧᰶ
Entire	Shem	ᰡᰬᰮ
Cold	Hyáng	ᰝᰤᰦᰵ
To be drawn together	Chom	ᰇᰨᰮ
One's Self	Te-do	ᰊᰬᰌᰨ
Wide	Veng	ᰟᰬᰵ
To arrest	Tho	ᰋᰨ
To crush	Shíp	ᰡᰧᰶ
Mouth	A-bong	ᰣᰓᰨᰵ
To twist	Kar	ᰀᰲ
Arrow	Sa-li	ᰠᰜᰧ
Egg	Tí	ᰊᰧᰶ
To sit	Ngan	ᰅᰰ
Flow round	Kyúl	ᰀᰤᰫᰯ
Overclouded	Pe-mang	ᰎᰬᰕᰴ
House	A-dóng	ᰣᰌᰩᰵ
Carry	Bú	ᰓᰫ
Dream	Mong	ᰕᰨᰵ
A corner	Tung-kyang	ᰊᰪᰵᰀᰤᰴ
Basket	Dyóng	ᰌᰤᰩᰵ
Large	Túng	ᰊᰫᰵ
Husband	Evo	ᰣᰬᰟᰨ
Grain	Gró	ᰃᰥᰩ
Rice basket	Ku-mu	ᰀᰪᰕᰪ
Placenta	A-yeng-tyol	ᰣᰚᰬᰵᰊᰤᰨᰯ
Quick	Rem	ᰛᰬᰮ
Sew	Hrap	ᰝᰥᰱ
A spec of Solanum	Ke-lim-bi	ᰀᰬᰜᰧᰮᰓᰧ

== Sample text ==
The following text is Article 1 of the Universal Declaration of Human Rights in Lepcha:

=== Lepcha in Róng Script ===
ᰠᰕᰆᰪ ᰍᰬᰊ: ᰠᰕᰆᰪ-ᰍᰬᰊ ᰀᰪᰃᰧᰊ ᰎᰦᰆᰎᰛᰌᰨᰅ, ᰣᰦᰓᰪᰣᰦᰕᰨᰊ, ᰣᰦᰈᰤᰀ, ᰠᰅᰃᰤᰨ ᰃᰬᰍᰎᰍ ᰣᰰ ᰠᰕᰠᰕᰆᰨ ᰜᰤᰦᰅᰌᰬ ᰣᰰ ᰕᰎᰬᰜᰟᰪ ᰏᰤᰨᰍᰰ ᰍᰪᰛ, ᰣᰧᰊ ᰣᰍ ᰠᰈᰨᰅᰌᰨᱏᰨᰈᰨᰅ ᰠᰤᰪᰋᰨ ᰠᰪᰈᰨᰅᰌᰨ ᰋᰨ ᰕᰪᰌᰪᰀᰕᰪᰌᰪᰀ ᰣᰦᰓᰥᰬᰊ ᰕᰃᰦᰊ ᰀᰦᰊ ᰍᰰ ᰀᰦᰊ ᰠᰕᰤᰪᰛᰬᰕ ᰣᰦᰛᰬ ᰇᰤᰨᰛᰧᰶᰀᰦ ᰎᰧᰋᰨ ᰋᰨᰅᰎᰨᰅᰠᰦ ᰋᰨᰅ ᰍᰧᰠᰧᰶᰕᰣᰨ ᰻ ᰣᰦᰛᰬᰓᰬᰀ ᰃᰬᰍᰎᰍ, ᰜᰤᰦᰅ ᰋᰨᰀᰦ ᰣᰦᰎᰧᰶᰍ ᰣᰦᰟᰨᰍ ᰜᰤᰦᰅ ᰌᰬᰎ ᰝᰦᰌᰨ ᰠᰮᰕᰪ ᰠᰛᰬᰌᰨ ᰋᰨ, ᰆᰰᱏᰧᰀ ᰈᰤᰫᰅᰕᰃᰦᰊ ᰣᰰ ᰜᰤᰦᰅ ᰈᰤᰫᰅᰠᰦ ᰈᰤᰫᰅ ᰜᰤᰦᰅ ᰜᰧᰈᰨᰅ ᰠᰳᰌᰨᰜᰦ ᰋᰨᰀᰦ ᰣᰦᰓᰥᰬᰊ ᰕᰈᰪᰀᰕᰣᰨ ᰻

=== Lepcha in Devanagari Script ===
समचु-नेत: कुगित पाचपरदोङ, आबुआमोत, आज्यक, सङग्यो गेनपन अन् समसमचो ल्याङदे अन् मपेलवु प्ल्योनन् नुर, इत अन सजोङदोडोजोङ स्युथो सुजोङदो थो मुदुकमुदुक आब्रेत मगात कात नन् कात सम्युरेम आरे छ्योरीका पिथो थोङपोङसा थोङ निसीमओ । आरेबेक गेनपन, ल्याङ थोका आपीन आवोन ल्याङ देप हादो सम्मु सरेदो थो, चण्डिक ज्यूङमगात अन् ल्याङ ज्यूङसा ज्यूङ ल्याङ लिजोङ सत्दोला थोका आब्रेत मजुकमओ ।

=== Romanisation ===
samcu net: samcu-net kugit pācaparadong, ābuāmota, ājyaka, sanggyo genpan an samsamco lyāngde an mapelwu plyonn nur, it an sajongdoḍḍojong syutho sujongdo tho mudukmuduk ābret magāt kāt nan kāt samyurem āre chyoriíkā pitho thongpongsā thong nisímao

=== IPA Transcription ===
/sam.cu net । sam.cu net ku.git paː.ca.pa.ra.doŋ, aː.bu.aː.mo.ta, aː.d͡ʒja.ka, saŋ.gjo gen.pan an sam.sam.co ljaːŋ.de an ma.pel.wu pljonn nur, it an sa.d͡ʒoŋ.doɖ.ɖo.d͡ʒoŋ sju.tʰo su.d͡ʒoŋ.do tʰo mu.duk.mu.duk aː.bret ma.gaːt kaːt nan kaːt sam.ju.rem aː.re cʰjo.riː.ka pi.tʰo tʰoŋ.poŋ.sa tʰoŋ ni.siː.ma.o । aː.re.bek gen.pan, ljaːŋ tʰo.ka aː.piːn aː.won ljaːŋ dep haː.do sam.mu sa.re.do tʰo, can.ɖɖik d͡ʒjuːŋ.ma.gaːt an ljaːŋ d͡ʒjuːŋ.sa d͡ʒjuːŋ ljaːŋ li.d͡ʒoŋ sat.do.la tʰo.ka aː.bret ma.d͡ʒuk.ma.o/

=== Translation ===
Article 1: All human beings are born free and equal in dignity and rights. They are endowed with reason and conscience and should act towards one another in a spirit of brotherhood.

== See also ==
- Lepcha script
- Sikkimese Tibetan language
- Languages of Nepal
- Languages of India
- Languages of Bhutan
