= Limbu =

Limbu may refer to:

- Limbu people, an indigenous tribe living in Nepal, Sikkim (India) and Bhutan
  - Limbu language, their Sino-Tibetan language
    - Limbu script
      - Limbu (Unicode block)
- Rambahadur Limbu (1939–2023), Nepalese Gurkha recipient of the Victoria Cross
