= History of Limbuwan =

Aspect of Nepal history

History of Limbuwan (Nepali: लिम्बुवानको ईतिहास Limbu: Yakthung lajee) is characterized by the close interaction of Limbuwan with its neighbours independent and semi-independent rule characterized by autonomy for most of its time.

Limbuwan was incorporated to the Kingdom of Nepal by the means of collective Gorkha-Limbuwan 1774 AD.Treaty with the kings of ten kingdoms of Limbuwan and their ministers.

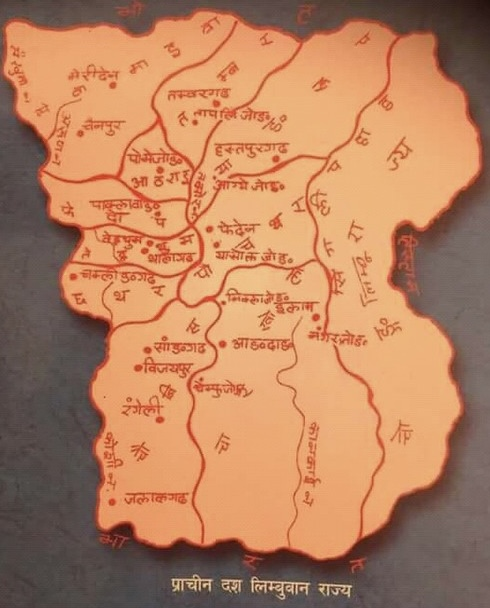

== Pre-history ==
The first settlement of Eastern Nepal were the Yakthung in the hills and Dhimal,Meches and Koches in the Terai. The people to live permanently and call Limbuwan their home were the Yakthung people which were later known as Limbu people by the rest. They spoke Limbu language and practiced Yuma Sammang their ancestor's culture / traditions.

== Bhauiputahang dynasty ==
=== King Bhauiputahang of Limbuwan ===
King Bhauiputahang of Limbuwan was the first independent king of Limbuwan (c. 580 BC). King Jitedasti became the seventh Kirant king in central Nepal around 580 BC. Kirant chiefs under King Jitedasti in the present-day Limbuwan area revolted against him and ceased to see him as their overlord. During that period all the Kirant chiefs used to pay monetary tribute and rendered military service to the Kirant kings of the Kathmandu Valley. The system was similar to the feudal system in medieval Europe. After the revolts, the Yakthung chiefs of eastern Limbuwan elected Bhauiputahang as their new king (Hang). King Bhauiputahang built his capital in Phedap and ruled eastern Limbuwan which comprised present-day Nepal.

While central Nepal was ruled by kings of the Kirant dynasty, Limbuwan in east Nepal was also ruled by kings of Yakthung dynasty. King Bhauiputahang was renowned in the Limbuwan and eastern parts of Nepal, while King Jitedasti sat on the throne in the Kathmandu Valley.

=== King Parbatakhang / Limbuwan (c. 317 BC) ===
A descendant of King Bhauiputahang, King Parbatakhang was a son of King Jeitehang and ruled Limbuwan around 317 BC. During that period, King Parbatakhang was the most powerful king of the Himalayan Limbuwan region and present-day Nepal. King Parbatak was allied with Chandra Gupta Maurya of Magadha, and also assisted him in his military campaigns in the Nanda kingdom. During his father King Jietehang's rule, Alexander the Great had invaded India and established his satraps in Punjab and Sindh. King Parbatakhang assisted King Chandra Gupta Maurya in driving the Greek Satraps Seleucus (military governor) away from Punjab and Sindh. For King Parbatak's assistance to Chandra Gupta, he gave lands in northern Bihar to King Parbatakhang and many Kirant people migrated to northern Bihar during that period. They became known as Madhesia Kirant people, King Parbatakhang is also mentioned by Magadha historians as an ally of Maurya Empire.

=== King Samyukhang of Limbuwan / Eastern Nepal (c. 125 BC) ===
After seven generations of King Parbatakhang, King Samyukhang sat on the throne of Limbuwan / Eastern Nepal. He was unpopular among the descendants of Madhesia Kirant people (descendants of those who lived in Bihar in King Parbatakhang's time). Under the leadership of Bazdeohang, people revolted against King Samyukhang and overthrew him. The Yakthung chiefs elected Bazdeohang as the new king (Hang) of Limbuwan.

== Bazdeohang dynasty ==
=== King Bazdeohang of Limbuwan (c. 125 BC on) ===
After the revolution of the Yakthung people of Limbuwan area, the Yakthung chiefs of the region elected the rebel leader Bazdeohang as their king (Hang). He made his capital at Libang and started his own dynasty. He was followed by twelve other kings (Hangs) of his dynasty:

- King Sangkhadeo Hang I
- King Sangkhadeo Hang II
- King Dewapour Hang
- King Bhichuuk Hang
- King Ghangtuk Hang
- King Sotumhang Hang
- King Limdung Hang
- King Lijehang Hang
- King Mapunhang Hang
- King Dendehang Hang
- King Kundungjapa Hang
- King Kundungjapa Hang of Limbuwan

The last king of the Bazdeohang dynasty had four sons: Mundhungge Hang, Sandhungge Hang, Kane Hang and Kochu Hang. It is said that Kochu Hang migrated to North Bengal and established his own kingdom, Kochpiguru, from where the term Koch is derived. After the death of King Kundungjapa, Limbuwan fell into chaos and anarchy, each chief ruling their own areas independently.

== Limbu kings (550–1609 AD) ==
Thus, with unity and strength of Yakthung leaders fixed the northern boundary to be in Tibet, the southern boundary in JalalGarh in Bihar, the eastern boundary at the river Teesta and the western boundary at the Dudhkoshi River. Later the boundaries of Limbuwan came to rest at the Arun river in the west and Kanchenjunga mountain and the Mechi river in the east.

The meeting of rebel leaders decided to name the recently acquired country Limbuwan as it was won by the strength of a bow and arrow (Li = "bow", ambu = "acquire" in the Limbu language). They also decided to divide Limbuwan into ten districts or kingdoms and place ten kings to rule each kingdom.

The ten limbu rulers, their kingdoms and their forts.

- Samlupi Samba Hang -- king of Tambar (his capital Tambar Yiok)
- Sisigen Sireng Hang -- king of Mewa and Maiwa kingdoms (his capital Meringden Yiok)
- Thoktokso Angbo Hang -- king of Athraya (his capital Pomajong)
- Thindolung Khoya Hang -- king of Yangwarok (his capital Hastapojong Yiok)
- Ye nga so Papo Hang -- king of Panthar (his capital at Yashok and Phedim)
- Shengsengum Phedap Hang -- king of Phedap (his capital at Poklabung)
- Mung Tai Chi Emay Hang -- king of Ilam (his capital at Phakphok)
- Soiyak Laho Hang -- king of Choubise, his capital at "Shaggori Yiokma" (Eden Vansittart, Hand for the Indian Army, "GURKHAS", 1906, 1991, 2012)
- Tappeso Perung Hang -- king of Thala (his capital at Thala Yiok)
- Taklung Khewa Hang -- king of Chethar (his capital at Yiok)

== Ten kings of Limbuwan ==
=== King Mung Mawrong Hang ===
At the beginning of the 7th century, King Mung Mawrong Hang came to prominence in the terai lands of Limbuwan (present-day Sunsari, Morang and Jhapa area). He cleared much of the forest area in present-day Rangeli, east of Biratnagar, and built a town there. Since the ten kings of Limbuwan had sovereignty over the terai lands through the Kingdom of Ilam and the Kingdom of Bodhey (Choubise), they assembled a collective Limbuwan force and chased King Mawrong from Rongli area.

Mawrong went to Tibet and took refuge in Khampa Jong, but he still had an ambition to rule all of Limbuwan. When Limbuwan was ruled by ten kings and when King Mawrong came to prominence, Tibet was ruled by King Tsrong Tsen Gempo. Mawrong went on to ally with Tibetan King Tsrong Tsen Gempo, managed to get Bhutia tribes of Khampa jong to assist him and planned on attacking Limbuwan from the north. King Mawrong attacked Limbuwan, the ten kings of Limbuwan brought their forces and fought decisive battle through Hatia, Walungchung and Tapkey passes in the Himalayas. Ten kings of Limbuwan lost and King Mawrong rose as the overlord of Limbuwan. The ten kings of Limbuwan still continued to rule their original places as subordinate to King Mung Mawrong.

King Mawrong also started a festival among the Yakthung people called “Namban”, where people celebrate the gathering of harvest every year, in the last week of December.

King Mawrong had no male heir, so when he died one of his ministers took over, becoming King Mokwanhang . After a brief period King Uba Hang came to prominence in Limbuwan area.

== Lasahang dynasty ==
=== King Uba Hang (ruled 849–865 AD) ===
Following the death of King Mawrong hang, Uba Hang became powerful and renowned in Limbuwan area. He subdued the Limbuwan area which was under King Mokwansan hang and became King (hang). He is known for introducing new faith among Yakthung people and bringing changes to the mundhum religion. He taught his subjects to worship the great spirit of Tagera Ningwafumang with flowers and fruit, but not with blood sacrifice.

He built Chempojong fort and palace in Ilam. He introduced the festival of Tong Sum Tong Nam, held every three years in honour of Limbu Ancestor goddess Yuma Sammang and supreme god Tagera Ningwafumang. This Tong Sum Tong Nam festival is still held in Panchthar district of Nepal and is called Trisala Puja in Nepali language.

=== King Mabo Hang (ruled 865–880 AD) ===
King Mabo Hang succeeded his father King Uba Hang in Limbuwan. He ruled Limbuwan for 15 years with the title of Thakthakkum Mabo Hang. He was well respected and known in Limbuwan and many also believed him to be the reincarnation of god. He moved his capital from Chempo Jong in Ilam to Yasok Jong in Panchthar.

=== King Muda Hang ===
After the death of Mabo hang his son Muda hang succeeded to the throne, but he was a weak king and unlike his father and grandfather he was not able to subdue all the rulers of ten Limbuwan. The ten rulers of Limbuwan declared independence in their own districts and began ruling independently. There was anarchy and chaos in Limbuwan as the rulers and clan chiefs tried to establish their own hegemony over Limbuwan. Thus Limbuwan disintegrated, and Lasa dynasty kings were reduced to being only kings of Panchthar area and the southern Limbuwan.

=== King Wedo Hang ===
In the chaos and integration of Limbuwan, King Muda hang was succeeded by his son Wedo Hang. He ruled from Hellang palace in Panthar. In Panchthar district King Muda Hang was fighting Nembang hang Chief, the same chief fought with king wedo hang as well. When chief Nembang hang failed to defeat he plotted King Wedo Hang's assassination, he married his sister Dalima to King Wedo Hang to be close to Hellang Palace. King Wedo Hang was murdered by his enemies while he was sleeping. Queen Dalima, sister of Nembang chief was pregnant with King Wedo's child at the time of the murder. Chief Pathong Hang sat on the throne of Hellang palace ruling present-day Panchthar area. Queen Dalima left Hellang palace and went on to live in Chempojong palace in Ilam. Chempojong palace was the ancestral home of the Lasahang dynasty kings built by King Uba Hang.

=== King Chemjong Hang ===
The fifth king of Lasa dynasty was King Chemjong Hang. He was born in Chempojong palace in Ilam, where his mother was living. When he was born his mother disguised him by dressing him as a girl, fearing that Chief Pathong Hang's people would come and murder him. She told him that his father's enemy would destroy him if they were to find out his true identity. He grew up to be a wise and strong individual under the disguise as a girl. His mother having told him of his late father's followers in the northern part of Limbuwan, he made his way there and forged alliances with the chiefs. He made a surprise attack while everyone at Hellang palace was celebrating the marriage of one of the district chiefs. After capturing Hellang palace, he revealed his identity to all those present and they accepted him as the true ruler and heir of the late King Wedo Hang. Since he had no real name and that he was born in the old palace of Chempojong, the assembled chiefs decided to name him Chemjong Hang, which became his name. He once again tried to unite all of Limbuwan and succeeded in extending from present-day Panchthar, Illam, Dhankuta, Sunsari, Morang and Jhapa. Back in those days Morang composed of the lower terai lands of Sunsari, Morang and Jhapa, while northern Limbuwan was still in fragments.

== King Sirijunga Hang (880–915) ==
King Galijunga hang who ruled the Yangwarok kingdom of Limbuwan during the time of King Uba Hang; Ubahang was Galijunga's overlord at the period. As King Muda hang became weak and started losing control of Limbuwan, the grandson of King Galijung, Sirijunga rose to power in the northern Limbuwan area.

=== Unification of northern Limbuwan ===
During the anarchic period of King Muda Hang, King Sirijunga became powerful enough to subdue all the Yakthungchiefs under his control.

=== Famous Sirijunga forts ===
King Sirijung constructed two big forts at present-day Sirjung in Terhathum district and Chainpur in Sankhuwasabha district. The forts were named Sirjunga fort, and the remains of the structures still stand today.

=== King Sirijunga script ===
King Sirijunga hang is also known for invention and introducing Limbu script to the Yakthungs, which is still in use today. The mundhum, Limbu religious text of Mundhum states that King Sirijunga was asked by Nisammang (Limbu god of learning) to accompany her to the base of mount Phoktanglungma. The goddess took him to the deepest cave in the mountain and gave him the stone slab consisting of writings. There he was also blessed with the power of knowledge; the goddess taught him how to read and write that language and told him to spread the scriptures to his people. The king returned to his palace and began teaching the script and knowledge to Limbu people.

=== Kipat land system of King Sirijunga ===
King Sirijunga is also known for his famous land reform law. He introduced a Kipat land system, whereby he divided lands to the chiefs of each clan or village and vested them with the full power over his land. The chief's powers did not extend beyond his borders and chiefs were expected to extend full military support from his village during the time of war to all the Kings of Limbuwan for the protection of Limbuwan. One of the important characteristics of the Kipat system was that neither the chief nor his people were allowed to sell their land to any outsiders or any non-clan members. Non-clan members were only allowed to rent the land for the period of time and were not supposed to take permanent land ownership. The land was to be divided equally among all sons and unmarried daughters. He also decreed that all the chiefs of villages must have a council, called Chumlung, of four members to assist him in ruling the villages. The chief presided over all the clan/village meetings and festivals. He also had enough powers so that his decisions were considered final. Ever since the time of King Sirijunga, Limbu people of Limbuwan have been enjoying special Kipat rights over their lands. No one could take away the Kipat lands and the lands belonged communally to specific clan. The Kipat land system devised by King Sirijunga of Limbuwan gained popularity in other Kirant areas in Nepal as well. The Kipat land system was used by people of Kirant Rai, Kirant Sunuwar and even Tamang people. Following King Sirijunga all the rulers of Limbuwan area up to King Mahendra had promised to uphold the special laws and custom of the Kipat system of Limbuwan during or right after their coronation.

== After King Sirijunga ==
After the death of King Sirijunga, Limbuwan was once again ruled by the ten kings of the kingdoms of Limbuwan; this period lasted from 915 to 1584. The ten kingdoms formed after the great revolution of Limbuwan in the 6th century all remained the same. The current state of Limbu nation, culture, language and ethnicity is believed to have taken shape during this period.

During this period, the lowlands of Limbuwan (present-day terai lands of Sunsari, Morang and Jhapa) collectively known as Morang since the time of King Mung Mawrong Hang, developed as a kingdom in its own right. At the beginning of 1400, Morang Kingdom patriates from the Kingdom of Ilam and the Kingdom of Mikluk Bodhey (Choubise) and began ruling on its own. Morang Kingdom's borders were set at Kankai river in the east, Koshi river in the west, Shanguri fort in the north and Jalal garh in India in the south. King Sangla Ing became the first king of the lowland Limbuwan kingdom of Morang after 900 years since it last had its own king. He built alliances with the other kings of Limbuwan and remained on good terms. He built his kingdom at Varatappa and ruled from there. King Sangla Ing was succeeded by his son Pungla Ing, who later converted to Hinduism and changed his name to Amar Raya Ing.

== Sanglaing dynasty kings ==
The Sanglaing dynasty kings were:

- King Sangla Ing (first king of Ing dynasty)
- King Pungla Ing (became Amar Raya Ing)
- King Kirti Narayan Raya Ing
- King Ap Narayan Raya Ing
- King Jarai Narayan Raya Ing
- King Indhing Narayan Raya Ing
- King Bijay Narayan Raya Ing

The last king of the Ing dynasty of Morang Kingdom Bijay Narayan built a good friendship with the king of Phedap, Murray Hang Khebang. He then advised King Bijay Narayan to build a new town after his name, and thus Bijaypur town was settled. Bijaypur town, near present-day Dharan City remained the capital of Morang Kingdom and of all of Limbuwan until 1774. King Bijay Narayan then persuaded King Murray Hang Khebang of Phedap to stay in Bijaypur and assist him in ruling Morang Kingdom as his prime minister. King Murray Hang Khebang agreed to the proposal and his title of prime minister became a hereditary position for his descendants. In this way King Bijay Narayan Raya Sanglaing effectively made King Murray Hang his prime minister and Murray Hang's son Bajahang Raya Khebang ruled the kingdom of Phedap under his father. King Bijay Narayan also gave the title of Raya, “King”, to Murray Hang. Since then, King Murray Hang Khebang became the first prime minister of Limbuwan and second king of Limbuwan to hold the Hindu title of “Raya”.

Over time, the relationship between King Bijay Narayan Raya Sanlgaing and his prime minister Murray Hang Khebang soured. The king accused Murray Hang of raping his daughter and sentenced him to death. Hearing the news of Murray Hang's betrayal by the king of Morang, his son King Bajahang Khebang decided to punish the King of Morang. He went to Makwanpur and asked for the help of King Lo Hang Sen of Makwanpur. King Lohang Sen of Makwanpur with the help of the Kirant force conquered Bijaypur in 1608. King of Phedap Bajahang Khebang, who had come to take revenge of his father's death, died on the battlefield; at the same time, King Bijay Narayan also died of natural causes. King Lohang Sen of Makwanpur then appointed King Bajahang Khebang's son and Murray Hang's grandson, Bidya Chandra Raya Khebang, as prime minister of the Morang Kingdom and gave him autonomy to rule Morang. Lohang Sen returned to Makwanpur and King Bidya Chandra Raya Khebang went to Lhasa to get recognition as the real King of Limbuwan. King Bidya Chandra successfully gets the Royal document with the seal of Dalai Lama recognition of him as the ruler of all of Phedap and Morang. In the meantime, the rest of the kingdoms of Limbuwan were ruled by their own kings.

== Divided Limbuwan (1609–1641) ==
The death of King Bijay Narayan Sanglaing of Morang and the subsequent war of revenge by the King of Phedap led to the conquest of the Morang Kingdom of Limbuwan by LoHang Sen of Mokwanpur. This event led to the era of divided Limbuwan because the association of Limbuwan states no longer existed. Only a few of the ten kingdoms of Limbuwan actually formed alliances with the Sen king and saw him as their overlord. In the meantime, in 1641, when King Phuntsog Namgyal became the king of Sikkim, independent Limbu kings of Tambar Kingdom, Yangwarok Kingdom, Panthar Kingdom and Ilam Kingdom allied with the Sikkimese king, effectively dividing Limbuwan in half. From the enthronement of King Phuntsog Namgyal of Sikkim in 1641 to 1741, the eastern and northern Limbuwan kings allied with the kings of Sikkim.

== Namgyal dynasty in eastern and northern Limbuwan (1641–1741) ==
From about 1641 to about 1741, the Limbu kings of Tambar, Yangwarok, Panthar and Ilam kingdoms allied with the King of Sikkim and saw him as their overlord. During this time the other kingdoms of Limbuwan were allied with the Sen king of Makwanpur. King Phuntsog Namgyal of Sikkim died in 1670 and was succeeded by his son King Tensung Namgyal, who married three queens. The youngest queen was from Limbuwan, her name was Queen Thungwa Mukma, daughter of the King of Yangwarok, Yong Ya Hang.

During this time, Bhutan attacked Sikkim and occupied it for eight years. With the help of Tibetans Tensung Namgyal regained his throne. He died in 1716 and was succeeded by his son, King Gyurmed Namgyal. In 1733 King Gyurmi Namgyal of Sikkim died childless, then his minister declared himself the King of Sikkim under the title of “Tamding Gyalpo” and started ruling from the throne of Rabdentse palace. He ruled from 1738 to 1741. This threw the Limbu alliance with Sikkim into disarray as other ministers had placed the infant king on the throne. Meanwhile, in 1741, a Limbu scholar named Srijunga Sing Thebe of Yangwarok Kingdom of Limbuwan came to western Sikkim to teach Limbu script and literature to the Kirant people there. The Tibetan Tachhang Lamas of Pemayangtse monastery feared the Limbu Sirijunga Sing Thebe's actions. They killed him by tying him to a tree and shooting him with arrows. This caused anger in Limbuwan and the kings of all the kingdoms of Limbuwan that had allied with the King of Sikkim in 1641 broke off their ties with Sikkim and stopped regarding the kings of Sikkim as their overlords and allies. Thus the Namgyal dynasty ended in Limbuwan in 1741, and after breaking off ties with Sikkim, the four Limbu kings and their kingdoms remained neutral and independent.

== Sen dynasty in western and southern Limbuwan (1609–1769) ==
From about 1609 to about 1769 the Sen kings of Makwanpur were nominal kings of Morang and allied to the other five kings of Limbuwan. The era of the Sen dynasty in Limbuwan began with the conquest of the Morang kingdom by King Lo Hang Sen to avenge the death of the prime minister of Morang. They were basically Magars with Hindu titles as that was the royals trend back then.

=== King Lo Hang Sen (1609–61) ===
Following the enthronement of King Lo Hang Sen to the throne of Morang Kingdom at Bijaypur, Limbuwan also entered the phase of Hindu influence. King Lo Hang Sen ruled from 1609 to 1641 and managed to get all the kings of Limbuwan who were not allied with Sikkim on his side. He promised the Limbu people and their chiefs that the Kipat land system, the Limbu language, culture and way of life that had been practised for thousands of years would be protected. He also promised to Kings of Limbu kingdoms that they would get full autonomy and power to rule their own kingdoms. This way King Lo Hang Sen managed to become the King of Kings in Limbuwan and take the title of Maharajadhiraj. He appointed three Limbu ministers to his court in Makwanpur. In the meantime, the kingdom of Morang with its capital Bijaypur was ruled by the descendants of King Murray Hang Khebang, the Prime Ministers during the Sanglaing dynasty.

=== King Harihar Sen (1661–1684) ===
King Harihar Sen, the grandson of Lo Hang Sen, succeeded his grandfather to the throne of Morang. He extended Morang up to Gondwara in Bihar, gave himself the title of “Hindupati Maharaj”, and built a new palace in Chanjitpur in lower Morang. He placed his grandson Bidhata Indra Sen on the throne of Morang. This was not liked by Hahrihar Sen's sons so civil war broke out. In this chaotic struggle, Subha Sen, younger son of King Harihar Sen, was victorious and started ruling Morang.

King Subha Sen ruled Morang for 22 years, while King Bidhata Indra Sen was also ruling Morang. Both King Subha Sen and Bidhata Indra Sen were tricked into coming to the palace of the Nawab of Purnea, who then betrayed them and sent them to the Mughal Emperor in Delhi. Both the uncle and nephew kings died at the hands of the Mughal Emperor. After finding out about this betrayal, Queen Padmidhata Induraj Rajeswari, the wife of King Bidhata Indra Sen, called upon the allies of Morang Kingdom, all the nine kings of Limbuwan, to assist her in punishing the Nawab of Purnea.

=== Queen Padmidhata Induraj Rajeswari Sabitra Sen (1706–25) ===
The kings ruling nine Kingdoms of Limbuwan at that time were, Chemjong King, Pasenama King, Lingdom King, Khewa King, Sukmi King, Makkhim King, Vaji King, Gabha King, and Shah Hang King. They were titled Raya by the Sen Kings of Morang, Raya was equivalent of King.

Another war of revenge broke out with the united forces of Limbuwan under the command of Chemjong King and the Nawab of Purnea at Jalal Garh. The Limbuwan forces were victorious; their leaders established the boundary at Jalal Gurh in the south.

The kings of Limbuwan decided to bring the capital city of Morang back to Bijaypur from Chanjitpur. They placed Queen Padmidhata Indurajrajeswari on the throne of Bijaypur. The same Khebang dynasty kings of Phedap served as prime minister of Morang and other Limbus served as ministers and chautariayas.

In 1721, about fifteen years after the War of Revenge with the Nawabs of Purnea, Limbuwan established friendly and trading relations with the kingdom of Purnea in the south. King Pasenama, who was also a minister of Morang, went to Purnea and established the bilateral relationship.

=== King Mahipati Sen (1725–61) ===
After almost twenty years of reign, Queen Padmidhata died. The kings of Limbuwan and their ministers assembled and elected Mahipati Sen of Makwanpur, son of the late King Subha Sen, as the king of Morang and placed him on the throne in Bijaypur. He effectively became King of Kings of Limbuwan or Maharajadhiraja of Limbuwan. Mahipati Sen was a weak king; he had no legitimate issue, but had eighteen illegitimate sons. Kamadatta Sen, the eldest of the illegitimate sons, would succeed King Mahipati Sen of Morang and Maharajadhiraj of Limbuwan.

=== King Kamadatta Sen (1761–69) ===
During the reign of King Mahipati Sen, the prime minister of Morang was King Bichitra Chandra Raya Khebang of Phedap Kingdom. When Mahipati Sen died, he did not allow Kamadatta Sen to be the full ruler of Morang Kingdom because he thought Kamadatta was illegitimate. During this time, the Sen kings had given much of the terai lands of Morang to the Limbu kings and chiefs for their personal jagir, believing that they would not revolt against them.

The feud between King Kamdatta Sen and his prime minister grew as the tensions of the power struggle increased; Prime Minister Bichitra Chandra Raya Khebang was succeeded by his son, Buddhi Karna Raya Khebang Limbu. Buddhi Karna pursued his father's policy of disengaging Kamadatta Sen from state affairs. Then finally Kamadatta Sen had had enough; he came to Bijaypur and occupied the throne and expelled Buddhi Karna from Morang. Buddhi Karna went to Rabdentse palace in Sikkim to get help.

Kamadatta Sen turned out to be a worthy ruler and established good relations with everyone. He declared that all the Limbu kings of Limbuwan, their ministers and chiefs were to be of his own lineage and that they were to be treated as his own family. He also married Princess Thangsama Angbohang, sister of King of Hastapur yak who were defeated by the king of Yangwrook in Limbuwan. He appointed King Shamo Raya Chemjong of Miklung Bodhey Kingdom (Choubise) as his Prime Minister and requested him to come to his palace in Bijaypur and manage his country. He again guaranteed autonomy and Kipat to all the people and chiefs of Limbuwan. He established friendly relations with the king of Bhutan, king of Sikkim and Tibet. King Dev Zudur of Bhutan even sent his representatives to King Kama Datta Sen's coronation. Morang and Limbuwan already had good relations with the Kingdom of Purnea in the south and he also developed good relations with King Ranjit Malla of Bhaktapur.

Thus with his appeasement policies to the people of Limbuwan and good relations with the neighbouring states of Limbuwan, he gained much confidence and popularity in Limbuwan.

Meanwhile, in 1769, the exiled and unhappy prime minister of Morang, Buddhi Karna, planned a conspiracy to assassinate King Kama Datta Sen, who was ambushed and killed in Morang on his way to a meeting.

== Divided Limbuwan ==
=== King Budhhi Karna Raya Khebang Limbu of Morang (1769–73) ===
After the assassination of Kama Datta Sen, Buddhi Karna came to Bijaypur and became the last king of Morang,Limbuwan. But on hearing of the death of King Kama Datta Sen, all the states that made up Limbuwan and their allies split up. The kings of Limbuwan no longer had allegiance to Buddhi Karna. He seriously needed able ministers and chiefs to assist him in ruling Morang and all of Limbuwan. He sent people to look for King Shamo Raya Chemjong of Miklung Bodhey Kingdom to help him.

During this time,

- King Shridev Roy Phago -- king of Maiwa Kingdom
- King Raina Sing Raya Sireng -- king of Mewa Kingdom
- King Ata Hang -- king of Phedap Kingdom
- King Subhawanta Libang -- king of Tambar Kingdom
- King Yehang -- king of Yangwarok Kingdom
- King Thegim Hang -- king of Panthar Kingdom
- King Lingdom Hang -- king of Ilam Kingdom
- King Shamo Roya Chemjong Hang -- king of Miklung Bodhey (Choubise, including southern Panther)
- King Khewa Hang -- king of Chethar (including Dasmajhiya, Jalhara and Belhara areas)
- King Budhhi Karna Raya Khewang -- king of Morang (including present-day Sunsari, Morang and Jhapa areas)

King Shamo Raya Chemjong was responsible for leading the Kings of Limbuwan and chiefs of Limbuwan in signing a treaty with the King of Gorkha. King Shamo Chemjong was also the prime minister of Morang Kingdom and effectively ruled Morang when King Buddhi Karna was away from Bijaypur to seek help from the British. The king of Ilam, King Lingdom's son, was the last king of Limbuwan to sign a treaty with the King of Gorkha.

The Limbuwan Gorkha War ended in 1774, following a treaty between the King of Gorkha and the Kings of Limbuwan and their ministers in Bijaypur, Morang.

== Shah dynasty in Limbuwan ==
=== King Prithivi Narayan Shah (1768–75) ===
The Gorkha Kingdom under King Prithvi Narayan Shah launched a military campaign to annex Limbuwan, a region in eastern Nepal ruled by several Limbu kings. The war began around 1771 and lasted until approximately 1777, culminating in the full incorporation of Limbuwan into the expanding Gorkha Kingdom.

Key Battles and Military Campaigns

- Battle of Chainpur: Gorkha forces crossed the Arun River and engaged Limbu forces near Chainpur (modern Sankhuwasabha). The Limbu generals Kangso Rey and Sanbotrey initially resisted fiercely, inflicting casualties, but after prolonged skirmishes and guerrilla tactics, the Gorkha army gradually gained control.
- Fall of Bijaypur: In August 1774, the Gorkha envoys negotiated with the Limbu chief ministers of Bijaypur (capital of Morang). The Limbu leadership agreed to submit to Gorkha sovereignty under terms that preserved their traditional land rights and local autonomy.
- Capture and Execution of Buddhi Karna Raya Khebang: The last Limbu king to resist, Buddhi Karna Khebang, was captured in 1777 and executed, ending major armed opposition.

=== Treaty of 1774 (“Noon Pani Sandhi”) ===
Following military success, the Gorkha and Limbu leaders signed a treaty guaranteeing:

- Recognition of Kipat land rights: The Limbu people’s communal ownership of land, forests, rivers, and mineral resources would be respected.
- Autonomy: Limbu chiefs (Subbas) were allowed to govern their territories with self-rule under Gorkha sovereignty.
- Mutual oath: Both parties swore on salt and water that these terms would be honored, with a divine curse invoked if broken.

This treaty symbolized the formal integration of Limbuwan into the Gorkha Kingdom while preserving certain traditional Limbu privileges.

== Post-War Developments (1777–20th Century) ==
=== Early integration and uutonomy ===
The former Limbu kingdoms were reorganized into districts under the Gorkha administration. Former kings became local governors (Subbas), retaining some degree of autonomy. The Kipat land tenure system, distinct from the “Raikar” land system in other parts of Nepal, was maintained in Limbuwan, protecting communal land ownership.

=== Later erosion of autonomy ===
Over the 19th and early 20th centuries, successive Nepali governments, particularly the Rana regime, introduced policies that gradually eroded Limbu autonomy and Kipat rights:

- Suppression of the Limbu language and culture in schools.
- Legislation transforming new or uncultivated Kipat lands into state-owned Raikar lands.
- Replacement of traditional Limbu governance bodies (Subhas and Chumlungs) with state-appointed officials.
- Encouragement of immigration of non-Limbu settlers into Limbuwan, further diluting Limbu control.

=== Limbu resistance and political movements ===
Limbu uprisings occurred in response to cultural suppression and land reforms, notably in 1867 and 1870, though they were quickly suppressed. During King Mahendra’s reign (1955–72), attempts to affirm Limbu rights were undermined by land reform acts that contradicted the 1774 treaty, causing tensions and local resistance. Political organizations like the Limbuwan Liberation Front emerged in the 20th century to advocate for Limbu autonomy based on the historical treaty.

== Republican era in Limbuwan ==
Following the relinquishment of power by then King Gyanendra, the people of Limbuwan and Limbuwan concerned parties became the first group to voice their pain. They organised a first peaceful strike to let the people of Nepal know how unfairly they had been treated and how far they were willing to go for justice. August 7–9, 2007, was the first of many peaceful strikes and protest programs of the Federal Limbuwan State Council and other parties. The demand remains as before, the true autonomy based on 1774 and recognition of indigenous rights.

Understanding the sentiments of the people of Limbuwan, various political parties such as Maoists and others included Federalism in their manifestoes.

The United Nations Draft Declaration on the rights of Indigenous People has also brought new hopes of legally achieving the rights that people of Limbuwan lost unfairly. Kirant Yakthung Chumlung, an organisation of Limbu people, has come up with a policy and views on going forward with the Kipat and land issues of Limbuwan.

== Future of Limbuwan ==
As the shah dynasty has ended up, the treaty or the red seal of assent(Lalmohor) that has formed between the Gorkha King and Limbuwan King as Pallo Kirat also ousted. That is why, the Yakthung Laje Limbuwan as specific and historic nation in the eastern part of Nepal demanding for the free of nation states. For the purpose, the organisation, Yakthung Laje Limbuwan National Council (YLLNC) has formed in the presidency of Nir Kumar Sambahangphe Limbu in 2018 A.D. The council has demanded the Yakthung Laje Limbuwan as an independent country on the basis of historic, territorial, cultural, language, scripture and other religious values. It has also stated that the Yakthung Laje Limbuwan, not only fall in the Nepal but also in the recent territory of India. The president, Nir Kumar Sambahangphe Limbu of Yakthung Laje Limbuwan National Council (YLLNC) has announced to all the Yakthung Limbus to be united for the divided Yakthung limbu nationals as an Indian and Nepali to make a distinct and unique nationality in the world. It was a land of Yakthung Limbus but divided through the treaty of Sugoulee on December 6, 1815. The territory of Yakthung Limbuwan fall on the eastern part of Arun river and western part of the Teesta river, which is proclaimed as independent nation by the council. The territory has been proclaimed as an independent country of Yakthung Ladze Limbuwan on 6 March 2022 by Tutugyen Suhaang Nir Kumar Sambahangphe Limbu in response of Yakthung Ladze Limbuwan National Council (YLLNC). Now the demand of federal limbuwan have been almost collapsed. However some of the voices urging to form constitutionally the federal limbuwan state. Not with standing, the people of Yakthung Limbuwan are coming out of the dark shadows of the repressive past, Limbus and people of Limbuwan aspire to bring new hope, new development and new future to a Land that has existed so long with such an old history.

== See also ==
- Chasok Tangnam
- Kiranti languages
- Limbu clans and tribes
- Limbu language
- Limbu script
- List of festivals in Nepal
- Mundhum
- Rambahadur Limbu
- Sikkim
