= Buddhi Karna Raya Khebang Limbu =

Buddhi Karna raya khebang

Raya of Morang
- Preceded by: Kama Datta Sen
- Succeeded by: abolished

Subba of Limbuwan
- Succeeded by: abolished

Buddhi Karna Raya khebang was the last overlord king of Bijaypur Limbuwan. His kingdom extended from the Saptakoshi River to the Kankai River, encompassing present-day Sunsari and Morang districts, as well as parts of Jhapa.

== Rise of Budhhi Karna ==
Following the assassination of King Kama Datta Sen, Buddhi Karna arrived in Bijaypur and assumed authority as the last king of Morang. News of King Kama Datta Sen’s death led to the fragmentation of the Limbuwan confederation, as its constituent states and allied kingdoms withdrew their support. Consequently, the rulers of Limbuwan no longer recognized Buddhi Karna’s authority. Faced with the challenge of governing Morang and the wider region of Pallo Kirat during a period of political instability, Buddhi Karna sought the assistance of capable ministers and military chiefs. To strengthen his administration, he dispatched envoys to invite King (Shamo Hang Chemjong) of the Miklung Bodhey Kingdom to assist in the governance and restoration of stability in the region. Shamo Chemjong emerged as a prominent leader among the chiefs of Limbuwan and played a pivotal role in negotiating and concluding a treaty with the Gorkha Kingdom. Through his leadership and diplomatic efforts, he secured the recognition and protection of the Kipat system, thereby preserving the traditional land rights and autonomy of the Limbu people.

== Death of Budhhi Karna ==
He was tricked into coming to Bijaypur- (Limbuwan) present day Dharan for a negotiation, then killed by the agents of Gorkha Kingdom King Prithvi Narayan Shah in 1773 AD, Budhhi Karna Raya's soul is believed to have wandered around the area of his tomb (Budha Subba Temple) around Bijaypur and was said to be a friendly and helpful spirit. Then local people started worshiping the soul as an old king (Hang) believing it to bring good luck. In Limbu language Hang means King.

== See also ==
- History of Limbuwan

== Bibliography ==
- Mullard, Saul (2009), "Repaying a 'debt' with land, grain and taxes: Yug Phyogs Thub and his service to Bhutan during the Sino-Nepalese War" (PDF), Bulletin of Tibetology, 45 (2): 11–30
