= Limbu (Unicode block) =

- Range: U+1900..U+194F (80 code points)
- Plane: BMP
- Scripts: Limbu
- Major alphabets: Limbu
- Assigned: 68 code points
- Unused: 12 reserved code points

Unicode version history
- 4.0 (2003): 66 (+66)
- 7.0 (2014): 68 (+2)

Unicode documentation
- Code chart ∣ Web page

Limbu is a Unicode block containing characters for writing the Limbu language.

Limbu^{[1]}^{[2]} Official Unicode Consortium code chart (PDF)
	0	1	2	3	4	5	6	7	8	9	A	B	C	D	E	F
U+190x	ᤀ	ᤁ	ᤂ	ᤃ	ᤄ	ᤅ	ᤆ	ᤇ	ᤈ	ᤉ	ᤊ	ᤋ	ᤌ	ᤍ	ᤎ	ᤏ
U+191x	ᤐ	ᤑ	ᤒ	ᤓ	ᤔ	ᤕ	ᤖ	ᤗ	ᤘ	ᤙ	ᤚ	ᤛ	ᤜ	ᤝ	ᤞ	
U+192x	ᤠ	ᤡ	ᤢ	ᤣ	ᤤ	ᤥ	ᤦ	ᤧ	ᤨ	ᤩ	ᤪ	ᤫ				
U+193x	ᤰ	ᤱ	ᤲ	ᤳ	ᤴ	ᤵ	ᤶ	ᤷ	ᤸ	᤹	᤺	᤻				
U+194x	᥀				᥄	᥅	᥆	᥇	᥈	᥉	᥊	᥋	᥌	᥍	᥎	᥏
Notes: 1. As of Unicode version 16.0; 2. Grey areas indicate non-assigned code points

== History ==
The following Unicode-related documents record the purpose and process of defining specific characters in the Limbu block:

Version	Final code points (Note: Proposed code points and characters names may differ from final code points and names)	Count	L2 ID	WG2 ID	Document
4.0	U+1900..191C, 1920..192B, 1930..193B, 1940, 1944..194F	66	L2/99-245	N2042	Everson, Michael; McGowan, Rick (1999-07-20), Unicode Technical Report #3: Early Aramaic, Balti, Kirat (Limbu), Manipuri (Meitei) and Tai Lü scripts
4.0	U+1900..191C, 1920..192B, 1930..193B, 1940, 1944..194F	66	L2/01-137		Michailovsky, Boyd (2001-03-29), Draft proposal: Unicode Coding of the Limbu Script
4.0	U+1900..191C, 1920..192B, 1930..193B, 1940, 1944..194F	66	L2/01-138		Michailovsky, Boyd (2001-03-29), Proposal summary form for Limbu
4.0	U+1900..191C, 1920..192B, 1930..193B, 1940, 1944..194F	66	L2/01-231	N2339	Michailovsky, Boyd (2001-03-29), Proposal to encode Limbu in the BMP
4.0	U+1900..191C, 1920..192B, 1930..193B, 1940, 1944..194F	66	L2/01-139		Michailovsky, Boyd (2001-03-30), Printed samples of Limbu Script
4.0	U+1900..191C, 1920..192B, 1930..193B, 1940, 1944..194F	66	L2/01-184R		Moore, Lisa (2001-06-18), "Motion 87-M5", Minutes from the UTC/L2 meeting
4.0	U+1900..191C, 1920..192B, 1930..193B, 1940, 1944..194F	66	L2/02-055	N2410	Michailovsky, Boyd; Everson, Michael (2002-02-05), Revised proposal to encode the Limbu script in the UCS
4.0	U+1900..191C, 1920..192B, 1930..193B, 1940, 1944..194F	66	L2/02-135	N2428-1	Sato, Takayuki K. (2002-03-25), Comments from Limbu experts on n2339
4.0	U+1900..191C, 1920..192B, 1930..193B, 1940, 1944..194F	66	L2/02-136	N2428-2	Nembang, Til Bikram; Pokharel, Madhav Prasad; Kurumbang, Dilendra; Limbu, Kumar (2002-04-09), Comments on the "Proposal to encode Limbu in the UCS"
4.0	U+1900..191C, 1920..192B, 1930..193B, 1940, 1944..194F	66	L2/02-137	N2428-3	Limbu, Kumar (2002-04-09), Limbu Examples
4.0	U+1900..191C, 1920..192B, 1930..193B, 1940, 1944..194F	66	L2/02-154	N2403	Umamaheswaran, V. S. (2002-04-22), "7.5", Draft minutes of WG 2 meeting 41, Hotel Phoenix, Singapore, 2001-10-15/19
4.0	U+1900..191C, 1920..192B, 1930..193B, 1940, 1944..194F	66	L2/02-070		Moore, Lisa (2002-08-26), "Consensus 90-C10", Minutes for UTC #90
4.0	U+1900..191C, 1920..192B, 1930..193B, 1940, 1944..194F	66	L2/03-253		Kai, Daniel (2003-08-13), Lepcha, Limbu, Syloti, Saurashtra, Tai Le and Bugis Proposals
4.0	U+1900..191C, 1920..192B, 1930..193B, 1940, 1944..194F	66	L2/03-255		Kai, Daniel (2003-08-13), Introduction to the Limbu Script
7.0	U+191D..191E	2	L2/11-008	N3975	Pandey, Anshuman (2011-01-14), Proposal to Encode the Letters GYAN and TRA for Limbu in the UCS
7.0	U+191D..191E	2	L2/11-042		Anderson, Deborah; McGowan, Rick; Whistler, Ken (2011-02-02), "2. Limbu", Review of Indic related L2 documents and Recommendations to the UTC
7.0	U+191D..191E	2	L2/11-016		Moore, Lisa (2011-02-15), "D.7", UTC #126 / L2 #223 Minutes
7.0	U+191D..191E	2		N4103	"11.2.12 Limbu Letters GYAN and TRA", Unconfirmed minutes of WG 2 meeting 58, 2012-01-03
