= Te-ongsi Sirijunga Xin Thebe =

Limbu scholar

Tye-Angsi Sirijanga Xin Thebe Limbu ᤋᤧᤀᤱᤛᤡ ᤛᤡᤖᤡᤈᤱᤃᤠ ᤛᤡᤱᤌᤧᤒᤣ ᤕᤠᤰᤌᤢᤶᤒᤠ
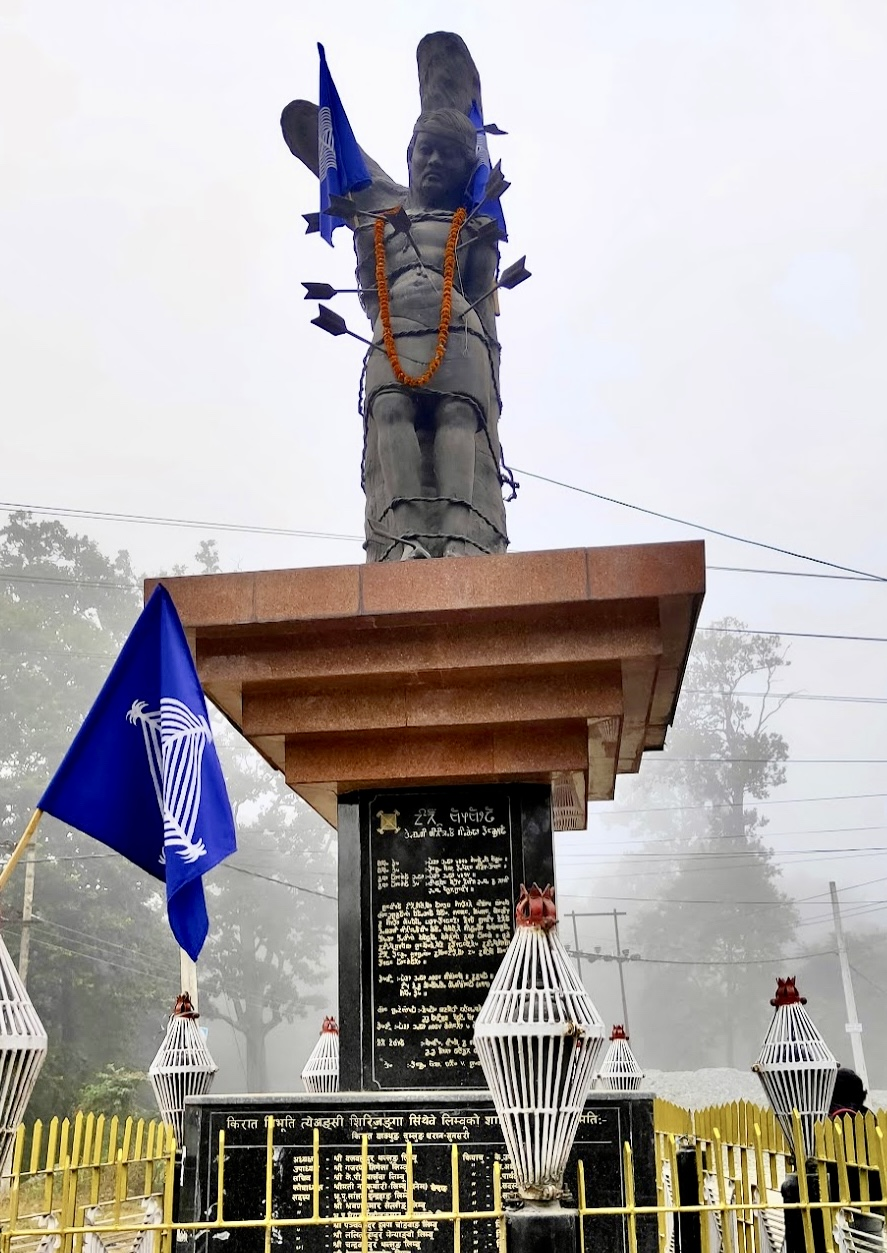
- Statue of Sirijunga at Dharan Nepal.
- Born: 12 December 1704; Tellok, Kuchintar, Yangwarok district, Limbuwan (Now Sirijangha Gaunpalika, Taplejung district, Nepal)
- Died: 1741-1742 AD; Kalej Khola in Hee-Martam, West Sikkim (Now state of Sikkim in India)
- Cause of death: Tied to a tree, shot by numerous poisoned arrows, clubbed to death by Bhutias soldiers

Tye-Angsi Sirijanga Thebe Limbu (ᤋᤧᤀᤱᤛᤡ ᤛᤡᤖᤡᤈᤱᤃᤠ ᤛᤡᤱᤌᤧᤒᤣ ᤕᤠᤰᤌᤢᤶᤒᤠ) was an 18th-century Limbu scholar, educator, historian, linguist, leader, and philosopher of Limbuwan (Nepal) and Sikkim. He was formally known as Sirichongba and even more popularly known as "Sirijanga".

== Life ==
Sirijanga was born in Tellok kuchintar (Yangwarok area) in Sen kingdom in 1704. His real name was Rupihang Thebe. The (Hang or Subba) part of the name is a common Limbu term indicating a family of high or royal origin. Sirijanga had accepted his Limbu nickname by claiming to be the reincarnation of a 9th Century legendary Limbu king Sirijonga hang who ruled the Limbuwan ( present day eastern Nepal) from 882 A.D. to 925 A.D. It has been widely believed that it was this legendary Limbu king who invented the ancient Limbu script, though no historical evidence exists.

== Work ==
Sirijanga Sing Thebe researched and taught the Limbu script language and religion of the Limbu's in various part of Limbuwan, Nepal and Sikkim, India. Sirijanga revived the old Limbu script. With the use of his newly revived script, he collected, composed and copied huge amounts of Limbu literature pertaining to history and cultural traditions. He travelled extensively through remote regions, attempting to amass sources of Limbu knowledge and culture. Eventually, he began going from village to village, publicising his findings and establishing centres of Limbu learning. In doing all of this, Sirijanga laid the foundation for a Limbu ethnic revival, and contributed significantly to the resistance against Tibetan Buddhist cultural domination. Sirijanga preached that acquiring broad cultural knowledge and experience was the key to the revival and enrichment of a community. In an attempt to trace the sources of his culture, he at first studied with local Tibetan Buddhist lamas, who at the time were the only means of connecting to a learned tradition in the region.

Sirijanga was also witness to the influx of the Hindu-based Khas culture from the western hill districts of today's Nepal. As such, along with his preliminary studies under the local lamas, he also practiced reading and writing in contemporary Khas, now known as Nepali. In order to better understand the dynamics at play in the region and to gather support for his movement, Sirijanga traveled far and wide to establish contact with rulers and powerful personalities. In one of these travels, it seems that he had either contacted or met King Jayaprakash Malla of Kathmandu. This multi-lingual and multi-cultural exposure to Buddhist and Hindu standards enabled Sirijanga to grasp the fundamentals of both the region's dominant cultures. During Sirijanga's life, the Bhutanese and Sikkimese quest for greater control over the eastern Himalaya led to many wars between Limbu and Sikkimese Bhutia (Bhutia indicating Tibetan origin) authorities. In due time, the lamas of Sikkim were able to extend their monastic centres in the northern areas of the part of Limbuwan that now lies in Nepal. After some time, this cultural encroachment enabled the Bhutia rulers to repeatedly subdue and take control of the entire Limbuwan territory.

The root of this state of conflict can be seen to lie in the politics of culture and knowledge at play in the region. Sikkimese Tibetan rulers and Buddhist spiritual leaders were able to subjugate the entire far-eastern Yakthung region by means of their hold over the established learned traditions and the systematic spiritual culture of Buddhism. It was the realisation of this that led Sirijanga to emphasise the necessity of a peaceful, knowledge-based movement.

Sirijanga's contribution to spreading Limbu script, Limbu language, Mundhum, and literature are immense. The Postal Services Department, Nepal Philatelic Bureau, Kathmandu has issued a postal ticket in his name in the Personalities Series.

== Death ==
Sirijunga entered Sikkim in 1734. The reason for his entry was the forceful teaching of Buddhism, the Bhutia language and the Tibetan script to Limbus and Lepchas by Bhutia rulers. This caused the Lepchas to lose their original religion of Munism. Sirijunga started teaching yuma mundhum and the Limbu script to Limbus. The Limbus stopped visiting Buddhist monasteries. The Buddhist monks, thassang lamas, saw this as not only a hindrance to the spread of Buddhism among Limbus but also a danger to the future of Buddhism. The Buddhist lamas with Bhutia rulers conspired to kill Sirijunga. Sirijunga knew about the danger to his life, so he took refuge in 'sirijunga caves'. But the lamas found him, tied him to a tree and killed him in Martam, Sikkim. His disciples were either killed or fled to Nepal. The Limbu language and script were banned in Sikkim, which caused the Limbu language to fall into obscurity in Sikkim.
