= Limbuwan =

Area inhabited by the Limbu people

Limbuwan (Limbu: ᤗᤡᤶᤒᤢᤘᤠᤴ, Limbuwan in Nepali) is an area of the Himalayan region historically made up of 10 Limbu kingdoms, now part of eastern Nepal. Limbuwan means Yakthung Laaje (Limbu: ᤕᤠᤰᤌᤢᤱ ᤗᤠᤈᤧ) 'Land of the Limbu speaking people'. Limbuwan was incorporated into the Kingdom of Nepal by means of a collective Gorkha-Limbuwan Treaty with the kings of the ten Limbuwan kingdoms and their ministers.

Limbuwan was fully independent until the Limbuwan-Gorkha War concluded with an agreement and integration into the Gorkha Kingdom in 1774 AD.

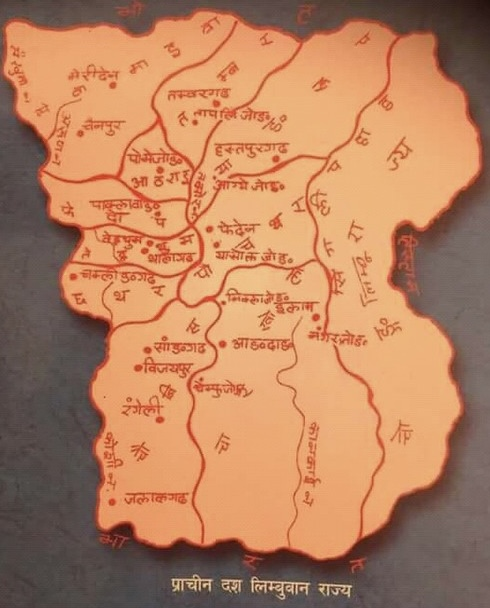

== History ==
Flag of Federal Limbuwan State Council.

The Ten Kings of Limbus came together to formally declare all the ten kingdoms between the Arun River and Teesta River to be called Yakthung Laaje.

The ten rulers, their kingdoms and their forts:

1. Samlupi Samba Hang, King of Tambar and his capital Tambar Yiok.
2. Sisiyen Shering Hang, King of Mewa and Maiwa kingdoms and his capital Meringden Yiok.
3. Thoktokso Angbo Hang, King of Athraya and his capital Pomajong.
4. Thindolung Khokya Hang, King of Yangwarok and his capital Hastapojong Yiok
5. Yengaso Papo Hang, King of Panthar and his capital at Yashok and Pheden (Phe meaning 'plain', den meaning 'place').
6. Shengsengum Phedap Hang, King of Phedap and his capital at Poklabung.
7. Mung Tai Chi Emay Hang, King of Ilam and his capital at Phakphok.
8. Soiyak LahoHang, King of Choubise and his capital at Shanguri Yiok.
9. Tappeso Perung Hang, King of Thala and his capital at Thala Yiok.
10. Taklung Khewa Hang, King of Chethar and his capital at Chamling Chimling Yiok.

=== Rise of King Mawrong Hang ===
After a brief period, Limbu King Mawrong Hang came to prominence and took over Terai lands of Chethar, Bodhey, Panthar, and Ilam (present day Jhapa, Morang Sunsari and Dhankuta). He named his Kingdom Morang after his name and rose to power. He subdued all the Ten Yakthung Kings of Limbuwan and became their overlord. He died without any male heir and King Uba Hang took over as supreme ruler of Limbuwan in 849 AD- 865 AD. He made many religious and social reforms in Limbuwan. Uba Hang's worthy son Mabo Hang succeeded him in 865 AD and ruled till 880 AD. Uba Hang kept on with the reforms his father had started. Uba Hang was succeeded by his son Muda Hang. Muda Hang was a weak ruler so the local chiefs started ruling their areas independently. Muda Hang was succeeded by his son Wedo Hang, by this time Limbuwan was in chaos and every principality was ruling independently and fighting with each other. Wedo hang was murdered and his son Chemjonghang succeeded.

=== Rise of King Sirijonga Hang ===
During this chaos and the waning phase of King Chemjong hang, King Sirijonga of Yangwarok kingdom rose to power. He subdued all the independent rulers and took over as the new supreme ruler of Limbuwan. He built two big forts in Phedap (present-day Terhathum district) and Chainpur (present-day Sankhuwasabha district). The remains of the structure still stand today. One of legacy was that he brought all the Limbus under the same writing system in Limbu script. He also brought feudal reform in Limbuwan and divided Limbuwan into new boundaries and districts.

Eventually after the establishment of Namgyal dynasty in Sikkim and under the Lho-Mehn-Tsong Tsum, a treaty between the Bhutia, Lepcha and Limbu people of the Sikkim area, Limbuwan lost the area between Kangchenjunga range (present-day eastern border of Nepal) and Teesta River to the Bhutia Kings of Sikkim. Since then Limbuwan comprises all the area between Arun River and Koshi River in the west to Kunchenjunga Mountains and Mechi River in the east.

At the beginning of the 15th century, the descendants of King Sirijonga hang became weak and Limbuwan again fell into chaos and anarchy. At the time, the two Yakthung Ing brothers from Kamrup Assam, had come and proclaimed the independent country of Phedap, Pokblabang and Bijayapur, Morang. The elder brother Sidi Ing became king of Poklabang, Phedap and the Lowland Limbuwan Kingdom of Morang was King Sangla Ing. After the 17th generations of the King Sidi Ing, got a glorius king Tena Hang. He had seven sons and called them as "Satre Nu hang" or "Sat Raya." Among of them Yen Hang Mukpa Raya was the king of Phedap and the descendants of him goes on "Sambahangphe" Limbus. The 21st descendant of King Sidi Ing, named Aatahang Raya made a treaty with Gorkha king Prithvi Narayan Shah in 1774 A.D. Some of the descendants of Yen Hang Mukpa Raya were not in favor of the treaty with Gorkha kings because they wanted to make their own territorial ruling system in great Yakthung Laje .

The other brother King Sangla Ing declared independence and became the first independent ruler of Morang in a century. His son Pungla Ing adopted Hinduism and changed his Hindu name into Aamar Raya Ing. He was succeeded by his descendants, who also bore Hindu names. Kirti Narayan Raya Ing, Aap Narayan Raya Ing, Jarai Narayan Raya Ing, Ding Narayan Raya Ing, and Bijay Narayan Raya Ing.

King Bijay Narayan Raya Sanlga Ing built a new town in the middle of Varatappa and Shangori fort and named it Bijaypur after him. He had no issue and died without an heir.

Bijaypur town was founded in 1584 AD and is currently located next to Dharan, Sunsari District. Bijaypur town remained the capital of Morang Kingdom and Limbuwan region until the Limbuwan-Gorkha War in 1774 AD.

Morang Kingdom was the most powerful and influential of all the Kingdoms in Limbuwan region and was able to establish its hegemony among all the other Limbu rulers. But in 1609 AD Sen King Lohang Sen of Sen dynasty captured Morang and ruled it for seven generations.

King of Phedap Murray Hang Khebang was made the chief minister of Morong. He stayed in Bijaypur and the King of Morong made his post hereditary. Murray Hang Khebang was given a Hindu name and he became Bidya Chandra Raya. His descendants remained Chief Ministers of Morong until Buddhi Karna Raya Khebang Limbu. Buddhi Karna succeeded the last Sen King of Morang Kama Datta sen and sat in the throne of Bijaypur Palace in 1769 AD.

=== Annexation into Nepal ===
Meanwhile, the Gorkha King Prithivi Narayan Shah was on a campaign to conquer all the hill kingdoms into his Empire. He attacked Limbuwan on two fronts. After the Limbuwan Gorkha War 1771-1774 AD, the Limbu ministers of Morong, and Limbu rulers of the ten principalities came to an agreement with the King of Gorkha. With the Limbuwan Gorkha treaty of 1774, Limbuwan was annexed to Nepal.

Limbuwan was attacked several times by Sikkim after 1774 AD. Battle of Morong during the British Gurkha war took place in Morong. Limbuwan was divided into present-day administrative districts in Panchayat era by King Mahendra.

== Migration of the Limbus ==
Archival research for the period 1830 to 1917 reveals that the British administrators were conscious that the Limbus were indigenous to Sikkim. Only small portion of Limbus migrated into Sikkim in 18th century. Following the end of Sikkim-Gorkha war at Limbuwan, all the Limbus who had fought against the Gorkhas by siding with the Sikkimese King, they assembled and decided to leave Limbuwan forever. About 32,000 in number and migrated in three groups. The first group went to Sikkim and settles in Rung, Rhino and Magnesia villages, the second group migrated to Bhutan and settled in Kuching, Tendu, and Jumsa villages and third group migrated to Assam and settles in Beni, Kalchini and other Meche and Koch villages.

== Other sources ==
- Chemjong, Iman Singh (2003). History and Culture of Kirat People (4th ed.). Kathmandu: Kirat Yakthung Chumlung. ISBN 99933-809-1-1.
- Saatrenuhang Tumbahangpe Genealogy and Phedap Limbuwan, 2063 V.S., Aashad. Myanglung: Jethansingh Bhagimansingh Tumbahangphe Family. ISBN 99946-969-7-1.
