= Limbu script =

Abugida used to write the Limbu language

Limbu ᤕᤠᤰᤌᤢᤱ ᤐᤠᤴ
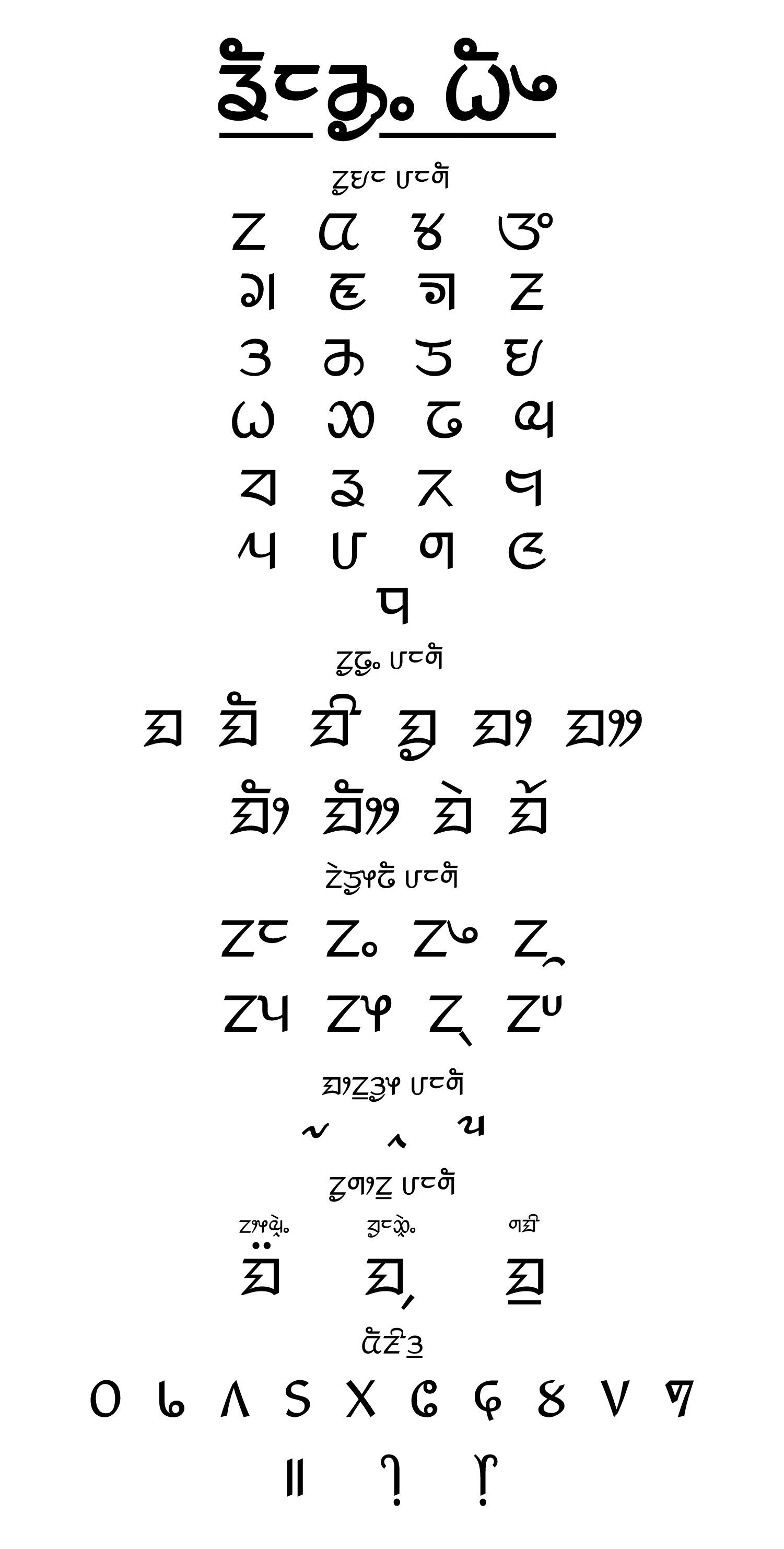
- Limbu Alphabet Chart
- Script type: Abugida
- Period: c. 1740–present
- Direction: Left-to-right
- Region: Nepal and Northeastern India
- Languages: Limbu

Related scripts
- Parent systems: Proto-Sinaitic alphabet: Phoenician alphabet; Aramaic alphabet; Brāhmī; Gupta; Tibetan; Lepcha; Limbu

ISO 15924
- ISO 15924: Limb (336), Limbu

Unicode
- Unicode alias: Limbu
- Unicode range: U+1900–U+194F

The Limbu script (also Sirijanga script) is used to write the Limbu language. It is a Brahmic type abugida.

== History ==
The Limbu script was invented in the 18th century by Limbu monk and scholar Te-ongsi Sirijunga Xin Thebe, in order to give the Limbu a distinct medium to commit their oral tradition to writing. He claimed that the script was used in late first millennium and that he had only rediscovered it, but no text from before the 18th century has been discovered. It was likely invented as an act of defiance.

=== Accounts with Sirijunga ===
The Limbu language is one of the few Sino-Tibetan languages of the Central Himalayas to possess their own scripts. The Limbu or Sirijunga script was devised during the period of Buddhist expansion in Sikkim in the early 18th century when Limbuwan still constituted part of Sikkimese territory. The Limbu script was probably composed at roughly the same time as the Lepcha script which was created by the third King of Sikkim, Chakdor Namgyal (ca. 1700–1717). The Limbu script is ascribed to the Limbu hero, Te-ongsi Sirijunga Xin Thebe.

== Structure ==
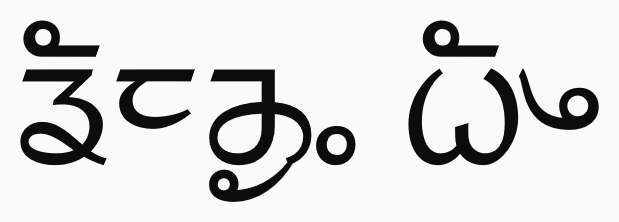
The word "Yakthung pān" written in limbu script

The Limbu script is an abugida, which means that a basic letter represents both a consonant and an inherent, or default, vowel. In Limbu, the inherent vowel is /ɔ/, as in Bengali–Assamese and Odia scripts. To start a syllable with a vowel, the appropriate vowel diacritic is added to the vowel-carrier ᤀ. A vowel-carrier with no diacritic represents the sound /ɔ/.

Consonants
ᤁ ko IPA: /kɔ/	ᤂ kho IPA: /kʰɔ/	ᤃ go IPA: /ɡɔ/	ᤄ gho IPA: /ɡʱɔ/	ᤅ ngo IPA: /ŋɔ/	ᤆ co IPA: /t͡ɕɔ/	ᤇ cho IPA: /t͡ɕʰɔ/	ᤈ jo IPA: /d͡ʑɔ/	ᤉ jho IPA: /d͡ʑʱɔ/ (Note: The letters ᤊ, ᤚ and ᤉ are not used in modern Limbu.)	ᤊ nyo IPA: /ɲɔ/
ᤋ to IPA: /tɔ/	ᤌ tho IPA: /tʰɔ/	ᤍ do IPA: /dɔ/	ᤎ dho IPA: /dʱɔ/	ᤏ no IPA: /nɔ/	ᤐ po IPA: /pɔ/	ᤑ pho IPA: /pʰɔ/	ᤒ bo IPA: /bɔ/	ᤓ bho IPA: /bʱɔ/	ᤔ mo IPA: /mɔ/
ᤕ yo IPA: /jɔ/	ᤖ ro IPA: /rɔ/	ᤗ lo IPA: /lɔ/	ᤘ wo IPA: /wɔ/	ᤙ sho IPA: /ʃɔ/	ᤚ sso IPA: /ʂɔ/	ᤛ so IPA: /sɔ/	ᤜ ho IPA: /ɦɔ/		

Dependent vowel signs
ᤠ a IPA: /a/	ᤡ i IPA: /i/	ᤢ u IPA: /u/	ᤣ ee IPA: /e/	ᤤ ai IPA: /ai/	ᤥ oo IPA: /o/	ᤦ au IPA: /au/	ᤧ e IPA: /ɛ/	ᤨ o IPA: /ɔ/ (Note: The diacritic ᤨ represents the vowel /ɔ/, which is the same as a consonant's inherent /ɔ/ vowel. So, ᤁᤨ and ᤁ represent the same syllable, /kɔ/. Some writers avoid this diacritic entirely, considering it redundant.)
z + ᤠ ᤁᤠ IPA: /ka/	z + ᤡ ᤁᤡ IPA: /ki/	z + ᤢ ᤁᤢ IPA: /ku/	z + ᤣ ᤁᤣ IPA: /ke/	z + ᤤ ᤁᤤ IPA: /kai/	z + ᤥ ᤁᤥ IPA: /ko/	z + ᤦ ᤁᤦ IPA: /kau/	z + ᤧ ᤁᤧ IPA: /kɛ/	z + ᤨ ᤁᤨ IPA: /kɔ/

Initial consonant clusters are written with small marks following the main consonant:

Subjoined consonants and examples with ⟨ᤁ⟩.
ᤩ y IPA: /j/	ᤪ r IPA: /r/	ᤫ w IPA: /w/
ᤁ + ᤩ ᤁᤩ IPA: /kjɔ/	ᤁ + ᤪ ᤁᤪ IPA: /krɔ/	ᤁ + ᤫ ᤁᤫ IPA: /kwɔ/

Final consonants after short vowels are written with another set of marks, except for some final consonants occurring only in loanwords. They follow the marks for consonant clusters, if any.

Final consonants and examples with ⟨ᤁ⟩.
ᤰ -k IPA: /k/	ᤱ -ng IPA: /ŋ/	ᤳ -t IPA: /t/	ᤴ -n IPA: /n/	ᤵ -p IPA: /p/	ᤶ -m IPA: /m/	ᤷ -r IPA: /r/	ᤸ -l IPA: /l/
ᤁᤰ IPA: /kɔk/	ᤁᤱ IPA: /kɔŋ/	ᤁᤳ IPA: /kɔt/	ᤁᤴ IPA: /kɔn/	ᤁᤵ IPA: /kɔp/	ᤁᤶ IPA: /kɔm/	ᤁᤷ IPA: /kɔr/	ᤁᤸ IPA: /kɔl/

Long vowels without a following final consonant are written with a diacritic called kemphreng ⟨᤺⟩, for example, ⟨ᤁ᤺⟩, /kɔː/.

There are two methods for writing long vowels with syllable-final consonants:

1. With a kemphreng diacritic and the final consonant, such as ⟨ᤁ᤺ᤰ⟩, /kɔːk/.
2. By replacing the final consonant with the corresponding full consonant and adding an underscore-like diacritic mark ⟨᤻⟩. This indicates that the consonant has no following vowel and that the preceding vowel is lengthened, example, ⟨ᤁᤁ᤻⟩, /kɔːk/. The same diacritic may be used to mark final consonants in loanwords that do not have final forms in Limbu, regardless of the length of the vowel.

The first method is widely used in Sikkim; the second method is advocated by certain writers in Nepal.

Glottalization is marked by a sign called mukphreng ⟨᤹ ⟩, for example, ⟨ᤁ᤹ ⟩, /kɔʔ/.

== Sample text ==
ᤛᤧᤘᤠᤖᤥ᥄ ᤀᤠᤍᤠᤱᤒᤠ ᤜᤠᤍᤠᤱᤔᤠᤛᤣ ᤗᤠᤶᤎᤡᤱᤃᤥ ᤗᤠᤶᤎᤰ ᤕᤠᤰᤌᤢᤱᤐᤠᤴ ᤖᤧ ᤘᤡᤁᤡᤐᤡᤍᤡᤕᤠ ᤀᤥ ॥ ᤛᤧᤘᤠᤖᤥ᥄ ᤀᤠᤍᤠᤏᤠᤒᤠ ᤀᤠᤍᤠᤏᤠᤔ ᤀᤠᤛᤧ ᤗᤠᤶᤎ ᤀᤡᤏᤠᤃ ᤗᤠᤶᤎᤠᤁᤠ ᤕᤠᤰᤌᤢᤱ ᤐᤠᤏᤠ ᤖᤧ ᤘᤡᤁᤡᤐᤧᤍᤤ ᤀ। ᤗᤡᤶᤒᤢ ᤓᤠᤙᤠᤁᤥ ᤘᤡᤁᤡᤐᤡ᤺ᤍᤡᤕᤠᤔᤠ ᤛᤫᤠᤃᤋ ᤇ। ᤗᤡᤶᤒᤢ ᤓᤠᤛᤠᤁᤨ ᤘᤡᤁᤡᤐᤡᤍᤡᤕᤠ ᤀᤜᤡᤗᤧ ᤀᤡᤴᤁᤢᤒᤧᤛᤠᤏᤠ (ᤐᤠᤖᤣᤰᤙᤠᤏ ᤘᤡᤁᤡ) ᤀᤷᤌᤠᤳ ᤁᤨᤁᤨᤔᤠ ᤇᤠ। ᤕᤛᤗᤠᤀᤡ᤺ ᤀᤃᤠᤍᤡ ᤒᤎᤠᤀᤢᤏᤠᤁᤠ ᤗᤠᤃᤡ ᤁᤠᤶᤋᤡᤔᤠ ᥈ ᤛᤠᤕᤠ ᤗᤧᤰ ᤗᤡᤶᤒᤢ ᤓᤠᤙᤠᤔᤠ ᤜᤢᤏᤠ ᤈᤠᤖᤥᤖᤣ ᤇᤠ। ᤋᤩᤛᤁᤠᤖᤏ ᤗᤡᤶᤒᤢ ᤓᤠᤙᤠᤔᤠ ᤗᤧᤂᤠᤜᤠᤖᤢ ᤗᤧᤰᤏᤠ ᤛᤢᤖᤢᤃᤠᤷᤏᤠ ᤛᤠᤒᤤ ᤗᤡᤶᤒᤢᤓᤠᤙᤡ ᤔᤡᤳᤖᤜᤠᤖᤢᤔᤠ ᤜᤠᤷᤍᤡᤰ ᤀᤠᤏᤢᤖᤨᤎ ᤇᤠ।

== Obsolete characters ==
Three additional letters were used in early versions of the modern script:

- ᤉ /d͡ʑʱɔ/
- ᤊ /ɲɔ/
- ᤚ /ʂɔ/

Two ligatures were used for Nepali consonant conjuncts:

- ᤝ jña (for Devanagari ज्ञ)
- ᤞ tra (for Devanagari त्र)

Nineteenth-century texts used a small anusvara (ᤲ) to mark nasalization. This was used interchangeably with ᤱ /ŋ/.

The sign ᥀ was used for the exclamatory particle ᤗᤥ (/lo/).

== Punctuation ==
The main punctuation mark used in Limbu is the Devanagari double danda (॥). It has its own exclamation mark (᥄) and question mark (᥅).

== Numerals ==
Limbu has its own set of numerals
0 ᥆	1 ᥇	2 ᥈	3 ᥉	4 ᥊	5 ᥋	6 ᥌	7 ᥍	8 ᥎	9 ᥏

== Unicode ==
Limbu script was added to the Unicode Standard in April, 2003 with the release of version 4.0.

The Unicode block for Limbu is U+1900–U+194F:

Limbu^{[1]}^{[2]} Official Unicode Consortium code chart (PDF)
	0	1	2	3	4	5	6	7	8	9	A	B	C	D	E	F
U+190x	ᤀ	ᤁ	ᤂ	ᤃ	ᤄ	ᤅ	ᤆ	ᤇ	ᤈ	ᤉ	ᤊ	ᤋ	ᤌ	ᤍ	ᤎ	ᤏ
U+191x	ᤐ	ᤑ	ᤒ	ᤓ	ᤔ	ᤕ	ᤖ	ᤗ	ᤘ	ᤙ	ᤚ	ᤛ	ᤜ	ᤝ	ᤞ	
U+192x	ᤠ	ᤡ	ᤢ	ᤣ	ᤤ	ᤥ	ᤦ	ᤧ	ᤨ	ᤩ	ᤪ	ᤫ				
U+193x	ᤰ	ᤱ	ᤲ	ᤳ	ᤴ	ᤵ	ᤶ	ᤷ	ᤸ	᤹	᤺	᤻				
U+194x	᥀				᥄	᥅	᥆	᥇	᥈	᥉	᥊	᥋	᥌	᥍	᥎	᥏
Notes 1.As of Unicode version 17.0 2.Grey areas indicate non-assigned code points
