= Limbu language =

Yakthung language of eastern Nepal and India

Limbu
- ᤕᤠᤰᤌᤢᤱ ᤐᤠᤴ Yakthuṅ pan
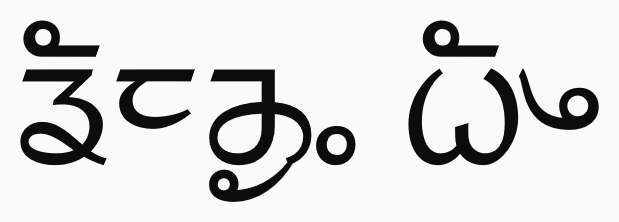
- yakthuṅ pan written in Limbu Script
- Native to: Sikkim and Eastern Nepal
- Region: Nepal; significant communities in Bhutan; Sikkim and Darjeeling district of India
- Ethnicity: Limbu
- Native speakers: 410,000 (2011–2021 censuses)
- Language family: Sino-Tibetan: Tibeto-Burman; Mahakiranti (?); Kiranti; Limbu
- Dialects: Phedape; Chhathare; Panthare; Tambarkhole
- Writing system: Limbu script Roman script

Official status
- Official language in: Nepal; Koshi Province; India; Sikkim

Language codes
- ISO 639-3: lif
- Glottolog: limb1266
- ELP: Limbu
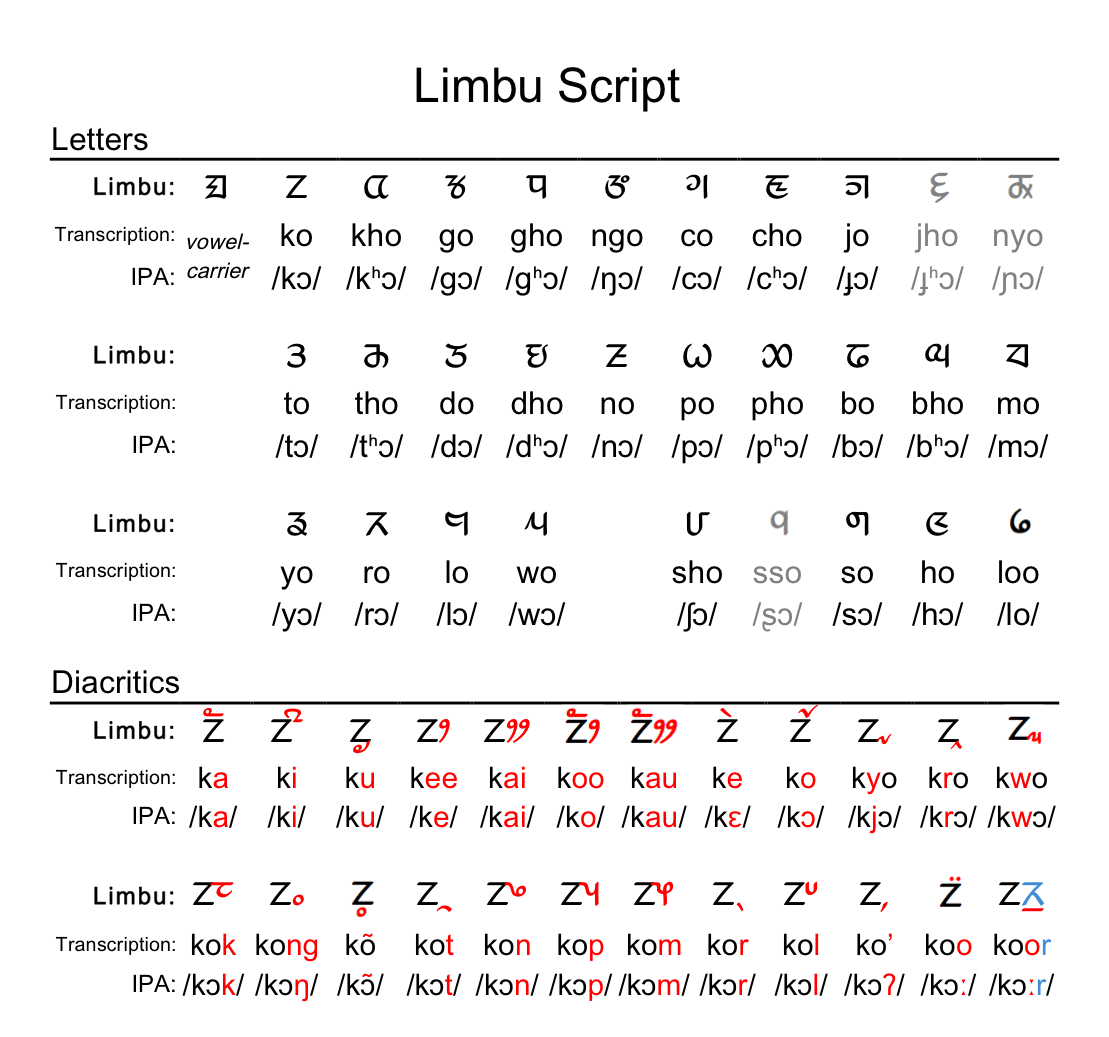
- Limbu script. Grey letters are obsolete.

Limbu (Limbu: ᤕᤠᤰᤌᤢᤱ ᤐᤠᤴ, yakthuṅ pan) is a Sino-Tibetan language spoken by the Limbu people of Nepal and Northeastern India (particularly West Bengal, Sikkim, Assam and Nagaland) as well as expatriate communities in Bhutan. The Limbu refer to themselves as Yakthung and their language as Yakthungpan. Yakthungpan has four main dialects: Phedape, Chhathare, Tambarkhole and Panthare dialects.

Among four dialects, the Phedape dialect is widely spoken and well understood by most Yakthungpan speakers. However, as there are some dominant Panthare scholars who have role to create knowledge and control knowledge in the Limbu communities, Panthare dialect is being popularised as a "standard" Limbu language. As Panthare Yakthungs are much more engaged in central political position and administrative positions, they are trying to introduce Panthare dialect as a Standard Yakthungpan.

Yakthungpan (Limbu language) is one of the major languages spoken and written in Nepal, Darjeeling, Kalimpong, Sikkim, and Bhutan.

== Geographical distribution ==
Limbu is spoken east of the Arun River in the following districts of Nepal (Ethnologue).

- Koshi Province
  - Dhankuta District
  - Ilam District
  - Jhapa District
  - Morang District
  - Panchthar District
  - Sankhuwasabha District
  - Sunsari District
  - Taplejung District
  - Terhathum District

== Official status ==
=== Nepal ===
The Language Commission of Nepal has recommended the Limbu language as official language in Koshi Province. Chulachuli Rural Municipality, Mangsebung Rural Municipality and Phalgunanda Rural Municipality have recognized the Limbu language as an official working language.

=== India ===
In India, the state of Sikkim has recognized the Limbu language as an additional official language for the purpose of preservation of culture and tradition in the state. The official weekly publication Sikkim Herald has a Limbu Edition.

== Dialects ==
The Limbu languages are divided into four dialects :

- Phedappe
- Panthare
- Chathare
- Taplejunge or Tamarkhole

Ethnologue lists the following dialects of Limbu.

- Dialect cluster 1
  - Panthare
  - Chaubise
  - Charkhole
  - Yanggrokke (Yanggruppe)
- Dialect cluster 2
  - Phedappe
  - Tamorkhole (Taplejunge)
- Dialect cluster 3
  - Chhatthare (Chatthare, Chhathar)

Yanggrokke, Chaubise, and Charkhole are minor variants of the Panthare dialect. Phedappe and Tamorkhole are similar. Chattare is less well understood by other dialect speakers. The Limbu dialect spoken in Sikkim, India is the same as Panthare.

== Phonology ==
=== Vowels and consonants ===
Vowel phonemes
	Front		Central		Back	
	short	long	short	long	short	long
Close	i	iː			u	uː
Close-mid	eˑ				oˑ	
Mid			ə			
Open-mid	ɛ	ɛː			ʌ	ʌː
Open			a	aː		

/ʌ, ʌː/ can be heard as rounded [ɔ, ɔː] after labial consonants.

Consonant phonemes
		Labial	Dental	Alveolar	Retroflex	Post-alv./ Palatal	Velar	Glottal
Nasal		m	n		(ɳ)		ŋ	
Plosive/ Affricate	voiceless	p	t		(ʈ)	t͡ɕ	k	ʔ
Plosive/ Affricate	voiceless aspirated	pʰ	tʰ		(ʈʰ)		kʰ	
Plosive/ Affricate	voiced	b	(d̪)		(ɖ)	(d͡ʑ)	(ɡ)	
Plosive/ Affricate	voiced aspirated	(bʱ)			(ɖʱ)	(d͡ʑʱ)	(ɡʱ)	
Rhotic				r				
Fricative				s				ɦ
Approximant		w		l		j		

Phonemes in parentheses occur in loan words from Nepali.

== Grammar ==
Limbu is a postpositional language. Noun arguments take case markers as well as postpositions. Double case markings happen frequently. The following word endings mark for cases in Limbu.

- absolutive -ʔin
- ergative -le/-re/-lle/-ʔille
- instrumental -le/-ʔille
- genitive -re/-le/-ille
- absolutivized genitive -re-n/-le-n
- vocative -e
  - non-singular vocative -se
  - rare vocative -re
- locative -ʔo
- comitative -nu
- mediative -lam
- elative -ʔo-lam/-ʔo-nu
- allative -thak
- intrative -lum-ʔo
- comparative -nulle (combined form of comitative -nu and genitive -lle)

Limbu is an ergative-absolutive language, with the agentive argument of a transitive verb will take ergative -le/-re/-lle/-ʔille, and the subject of a intransitive verb and the patient of a transitive verb will be marked by -ʔin.

Limbu verbs, which are polysynthetic in nature, exhibit double negators and agreements with objects, but lack third person subject agreements and noun incorporation. A typical Limbu verbal morphology can be described in following table:

Limbu verb template
+3	+2	+1	core	-1	-2	-3	-4	-5	-6	-7	-8	-9	-10
(kɛ-) 2/(mɛ-) 3/(a-) INCL	A/SBJ	(n- & mɛ-) NEG/Ø AFF	verb stem	RR/1>2	TNS	A/P (DU, PL, 3PL, Ø SG) ##	A ##	NEG	SBJ ##	P ##	A ##	1EXCL/1INCL	(-n/-nɛn) NEG

== Writing system ==
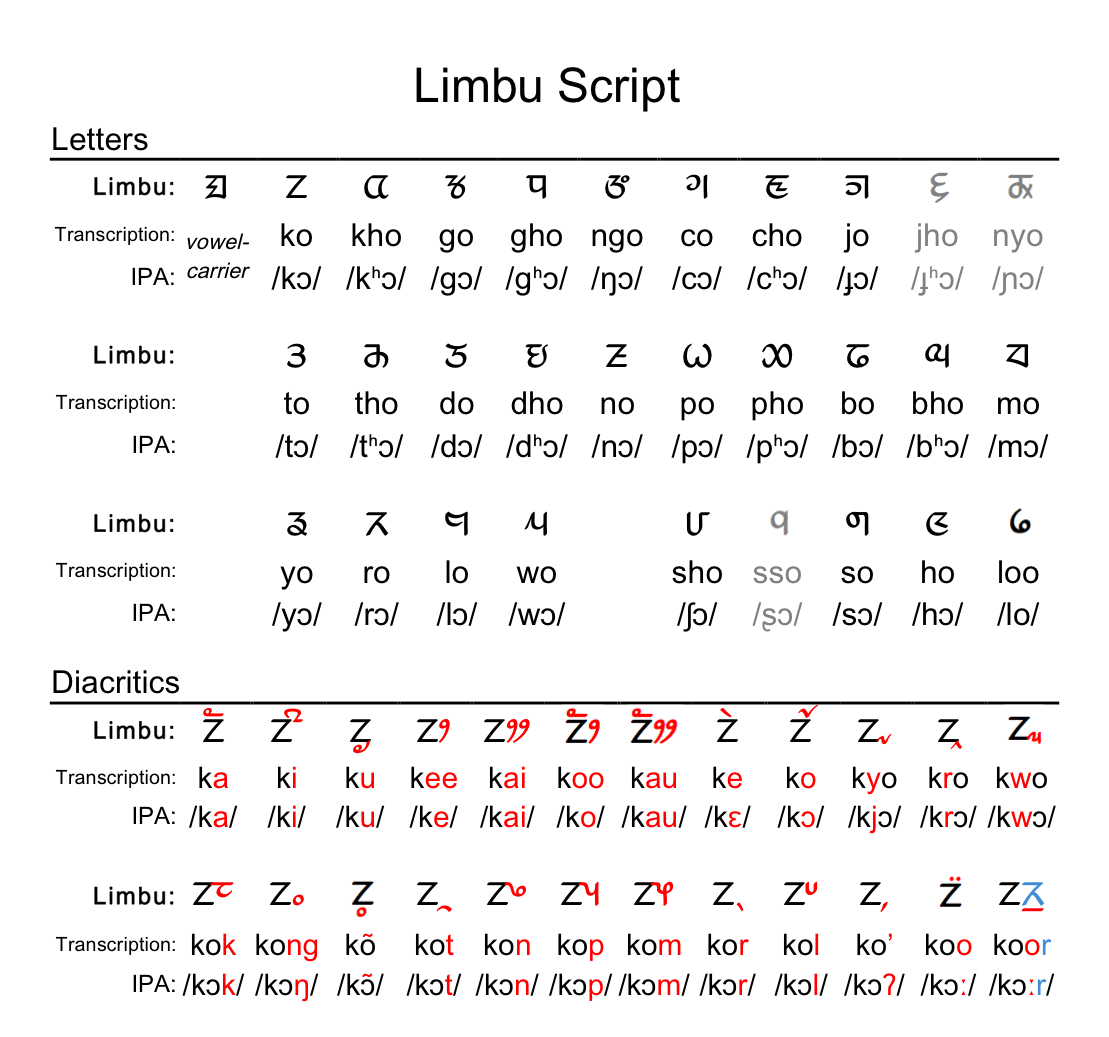
The Limbu script. Grey letters are obsolete.

Limbu language is one of the few Sino-Tibetan languages of the central Himalayas with their own scripts. The Limbu script or Sirijanga script was devised during the period of Buddhist expansion in Sikkim in the early 18th century when Limbuwan still constituted part of Sikkimese territory. The Limbu script was probably designed roughly at the same time as the Lepcha script (during the reign of the third King of Sikkim, Phyag-dor Nam-gyal (c. 1700–1717)). However, it is widely believed that the Limbu script (Sirijanga) had been designed by the Limbu King Sirijanga Hang in the 9th century. The Sirijanga script was later redesigned and re-introduced by Te-ongsi Sirijunga Xin Thebe . As Te-ongsi Sirijunga Xin Thebe spent most of his time in the development of Yakthungpan, Yatkhung culture, and Limbu script; he is considered as the reincarnation of the 9th century King Sirijanga.

As Te-ongsi Sirijunga Xin Thebe was astoundingly influential in spreading the Limbu script, culture, and language, Tasang monks came to fear that he might transform the social, cultural, and linguistic structure of Sikkim. Therefore, Tasang monks captured Sirijunga, bound him to a tree, and shot him to death with poisonous arrows.

Both Limbu and Lepcha scripts were ostensibly devised with the intent of furthering the spread of Buddhism. However, Sirijanga was a Limbu Buddhist who had studied under Sikkimese high Lamas. Sirijanga was given the title 'the Dorje Lama of Yangrup'.

The script has been influenced by Tibetan and Devanagari. Unlike most other Brahmic scripts, it does not have separate independent vowel characters, instead using a vowel carrier letter with the appropriate dependent vowel attached.

The Limbu language and literature have been less practiced in Nepal since the last eighteenth century. The cultural identity of any community was taken as a threat to the national unification by ruling elites until the recent years. The use of the Limbu alphabet was banned and the possession of Limbu writings outlawed. There were no specific laws about it, but the Security Act was enforced for such cases under the strong directives of Kathmandu.

Limbu has its own unique writing system, which is similar to Tibetan and Sikkimese scripts. The Limbu script or Sirijunga script was created and popularized by Te-ongsi Sirijunga Xin Thebe and his followers in the 18th century. Since teaching of Limbu/Yakthung language and writing was banned by the Khasas in Nepal after the "Noon Pani Sandhi" between the Limbuwan and Gorkha Kingdom (Prithvi Narayan Shah), far more Limbus are literate in Nepali than in Limbu in Nepal. Although many Limbu books were written in Devanagari and Roman (English), now Limbus/Yakthungs have well-developed computerized writing system and many books are published in Limbu script or Sirijunga script.

The historical development of Kirat-Yakthung writing can be organized into the following periods:

1. The 18th-century Kirat-Yakthunghang period: Te-ongsi Sirijunga Xin Thebe and his cronies movement
2. The 19th-century Kirat-Yakthung writers and rhetors: Period of Jobhansing Limbu, Chyangresing Phedangba, Ranadwaj, and Jit Mohan (Brian Hudgson procured books and requested them to write histories, stories, narratives, culture, and so on)
3. The 20th-century Kirat-Yakthung writers and rhetors:
  1. After the establishment of "Yakthunghang Chumlung" (1925); thereafter, several books were published.
  2. Limbu script was much more influenced by Devnagari script at this period.
  3. At the same time, both national and international linguists, researchers, and writers addressed the issued in this period. This period is period of inquiry, communication, discovery, and re/construction.
4. Late 20th- and 21st-century Kirat-Yakthung writers and rhetors: This period denotes after the restoration of democracy in Nepal in 1990. Introduction of "Anipan" at school; many research and writing such as MA/MPhil theses and research reports; establishment of Limbu organization at the local and global level; period of delinking, relinking, and linking epistemologies.

== Publications ==
The Limbu language has many papers and publications in circulation. For instance, Tanchoppa (Morning Star) is a monthly newspaper/magazine which has been published since 1995. There are many other literary publications. The oldest known Limbu writings were collected from the Darjeeling district in the 1850s. They are the ancestors of the modern Limbu script. The writings are now a part of a collection in the India Library in London.

== Teaching ==
In Nepal, the Limbu language is taught on private initiative. The Government of Nepal has published "Ani Paan" text books in Limbu for primary education from grades 1 to 12. Kirant Yakthung Chumlung teaches Limbu language and script on its own initiative.

In Sikkim, since the late 1970s, Limbu in the Limbu script has been offered in English-medium schools as a vernacular language subject in areas populated by Limbus. Over 4000 students study Limbu for one hour daily taught by some 300 teachers. Course books are available in Limbu from grades 1 to 12. Additionally, the significance of Limbu in Sikkim is that the name of the Indian state itself is a combination of two Limbu words: su, which means "new", and khyim, which means "palace" or "house".

== Sample text ==
The following text is Article 1 of the Universal Declaration of Human Rights.

=== English ===
Article 1: All human beings are born free and equal in dignity and rights. They are endowed with reason and conscience and should act towards one another in a spirit of brotherhood.

=== Limbu (Limbu Script) ===
ᤁᤢᤎᤠ ᥇: ᤁᤧᤖᤧᤰ ᤕᤠᤵᤔᤡᤜᤠ᤹ ᤀᤡᤱᤎᤠᤱ ᤏᤢ ᤕᤢᤰᤖᤧ ᤏᤠ᤺ᤶᤓᤣᤀᤠᤣ ᤛᤠᤘᤠ᤺ᤴᤏᤠᤣᤏᤢᤀᤣ ᤆᤠᤣ᤺ᤰᤕᤢᤶᤓᤠᤣᤒᤠ ᤏᤢ ᤐᤧᤶᤒᤧᤶᤒᤠ ᤔᤧᤘᤠ᤹ ॥ ᤂᤢᤏᤡ᤹ ᤏᤡᤛᤡ᤺ᤰᤐᤠ ᤏᤢ ᤂᤧᤛᤡᤱ ᤔᤧᤍᤠᤖᤢᤀᤠᤱ ᤔᤧᤍᤩᤧᤀᤠᤱ ᤔᤧᤘᤠ᤹ ᤜᤧᤰᤁᤩᤠᤱ ᤌᤡᤰᤘᤣ᤹ᤀᤠᤣ ᤑᤢ᤹ᤏᤢᤛᤠ᤹ ᤀᤡᤛᤡᤰ ᤀᤠᤣᤃᤠᤵ ᤆᤠᤣ᤺ᤰᤔᤠᤛᤡ ᤐᤠᤣ᤺ᤱ ॥

== See also ==
- History of Limbuwan
- Languages of Nepal
