= Yangthang =

Village in West Sikkim district, Sikkim, India

- Village
- Location in Sikkim, India Yangthang (India)
- Coordinates: 27.2836°N 88.2388°E
- Country: India
- State: Sikkim
- District: Gyalshing
- Subdivision: Gyalshing

Government
  - MLA of Yangthang: Bhim Hang Limboo (Sikkim Krantikari Morcha)

Area
  - Total: 525.68 ha (1,299.0 acres)
- Elevation: 3,680 m (12,070 ft)

Population (2011)
  - Total: 2,931
  - Density: 557.6/km^{2} (1,444/sq mi)

Languages
  - Official: Hindi, Nepali, Bhutia, Lepcha, Limbu, Newari, Rai, Gurung, Sherpa, Tamang and Sunwar
- Time zone: UTC+5:30 (IST)
- PIN: 737111
- Telephone code: 03595
- Vehicle registration: SK-02

Yangthang is a census village in West Sikkim district, Sikkim, India. As per the 2011 Census of India, Yangthang has a total population of 2,931 people including 1,506 males and 1,425 females.

Yangthang is an attraction of tourism. Buddhist Lamas are primary community of Yangthang.
