= Pemayangtse Monastery =

Tibetan Buddhist monastery near Pelling, Sikkim, India

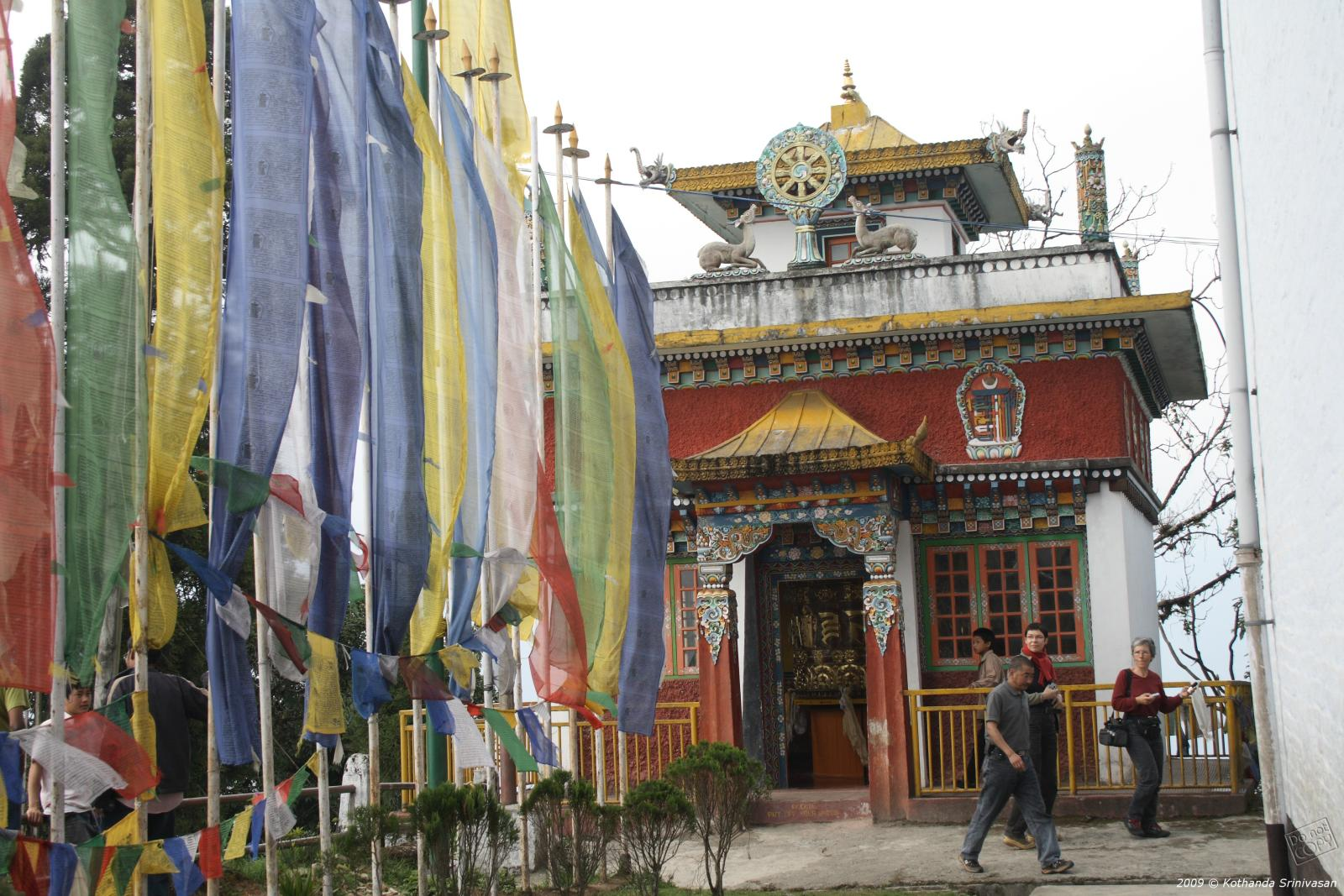
- Main Shrine of Pemangytse Monastery in Gyalshing district (Sikkim)

- Location within Sikkim

Religion
- Affiliation: Tibetan Buddhism
- Sect: Nyingma
- Festivals: Chaam, 28 -29th of the 12th Tibetan month.

Location
- Location: Pemayangtse, Gyalshing district, Sikkim, India
- Country: India
- Interactive map of Pemayangtse Monastery
- Coordinates: 27°18′16″N 88°15′10″E

Architecture
- Founder: Lama Lhatsun Chempo
- Established: 1705; 321 years ago
- Nearest town/city is Gyalshing & Pelling

The Pemayangtse Monastery is a Buddhist monastery in Pemayangtse, near Gyalshing city in Gyalshing district in the northeastern Indian state of Sikkim, located 6 km from Gyalshing city, the district headquarters, 110 km west of Gangtok. Planned, designed and founded by Lama Lhatsun Chempo in 1647, it is one of the oldest and premier monasteries of Sikkim, also the most famous in Sikkim. Originally started as a small Lhakhang, it was subsequently enlarged during the reign of the third Chogyal Chakdor Namgyal and Khenchen Rolpai Dorjee in the year 1705 and consecrated by the third Lhatsun Chenpo Dzogchen Jigme Pawo in the year 1710 C.E. The monastery follows the Nyingma Order of Tibetan Buddhism and controls all other monasteries of that Order in Sikkim. The monks of this monastery are normally chosen from the Bhutias of Sikkim.

The monastery was built for "pure monks" (ta-tshang) meaning "monks of pure lineage", celibate and without any physical abnormality. This practice is still retained. Only the monks of Pemayangtse Monastery are entitled to the title "ta-tshang". The head lama of this monastery had the unique privilege of anointing the Chogyals of the erstwhile monarchy of Sikkim with holy water. Pemayangtse means "Perfect Sublime Lotus", and is said to represent one of the four plexus of the human body.

The Pemayangtse Monastery is part of Buddhist religious pilgrimage circuit starting with the first monastery at Yuksom known as the Dubdi Monastery, followed by Norbugang Chorten, Tashiding Monastery, the Rabdentse ruins, the Sanga Choeling Monastery, and the Khecheopalri Lake.

== History ==
The history of the monastery is very closely linked to the reign of Chador Namgyal at Rabdentse. Chador, a very religious person, had taken several initiatives to the spread of Buddhist religion in Sikkim. He had decreed that the second of every three sons of Bhutia family shall be ordained a monk of the Pemayangtse Monastery. During his reign, the Guru Lhakhang Tashiding (1715) was built. He not only patronized Buddhist religious places but also introduced the religious dances (mystery plays) to highlight the martial and native traditions of Sikkim.

== Geography ==
The monastery located on a hill top in the west district of Sikkim is at the beginning of the popular Dzongri trek route - Yuksom-Dzongri-Goecha La is a trek of 46 km, which was started prior to 1960 and which is the most popular trek in Sikkim) to the Kanchendzonga range of hills and Khangchendzonga National Park (KNP). It is 7 kilometres (4.3 mi) away from Gyalshing on the main Pelling road and 44 km away from Pelling. From Upper Pelling on the Geyzing-Pelling road near a stupa, a bypass track of 1.3 km leads to the monastery; Pelling (2,040 metres (6,690 ft)) is the nearest town to the monastery. The view of Mount Khanchendzonga is said to be a commanding and impressive view from this monastery.

== Architecture ==
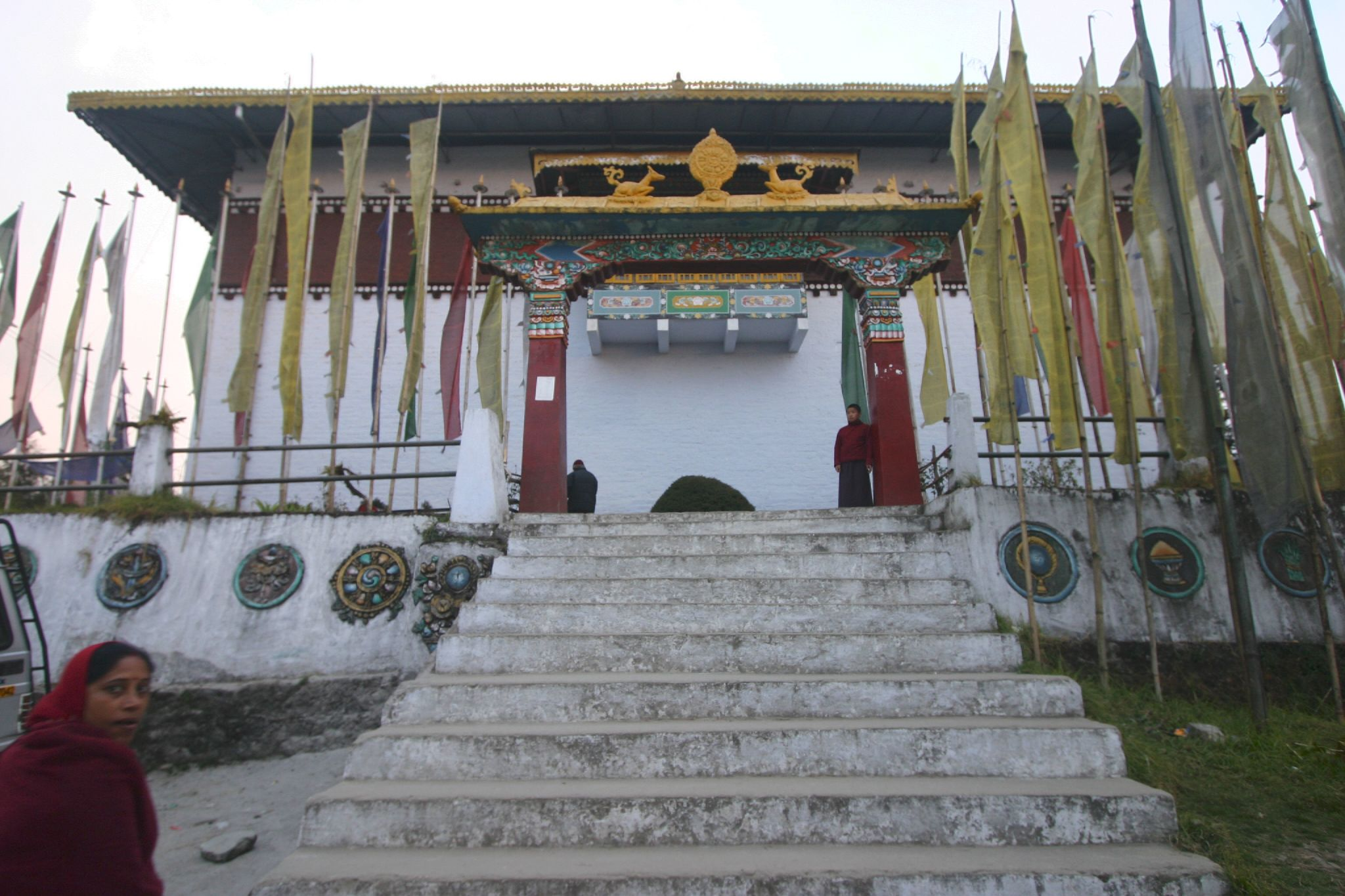
Front view of Pemayangtse Monastery

The monastery, located at an elevation of 2085 m, is built with scenic backdrop of snow-capped mountains on two sides. Built as a three storied structure, the monastery depicts paintings on its walls and statues of saints and Rinpoches, deified in various floors. The monastery was damaged by earthquakes in 1913 and 1960 but has been refurbished several times. The monastery belongs to the Nyingma order (established in the 8th century by Padmasambhava) and characteristic feature seen in this monastery is of statues of Padmasambhava and his two consorts.

In the main prayer hall (1,500 square feet (140 m^{2}) area), the Dukhang or Lakhang, the main temple, which has colourfully painted doors and windows, depict Tibetan designs. The main statue of Padmasambhava (also known as Guru Rinpoche who revived Buddhism in Tibet and was also the propagator of Vajrayana or tantric form of Buddhism ) seen here is in his wrathful form as Dorje Bhurpa Vjarakila with multiple heads and arms.

The monastery, which overlooks the Rabdantse ruins, has well manicured gardens within its compound where the residential accommodation for the monks is also located.

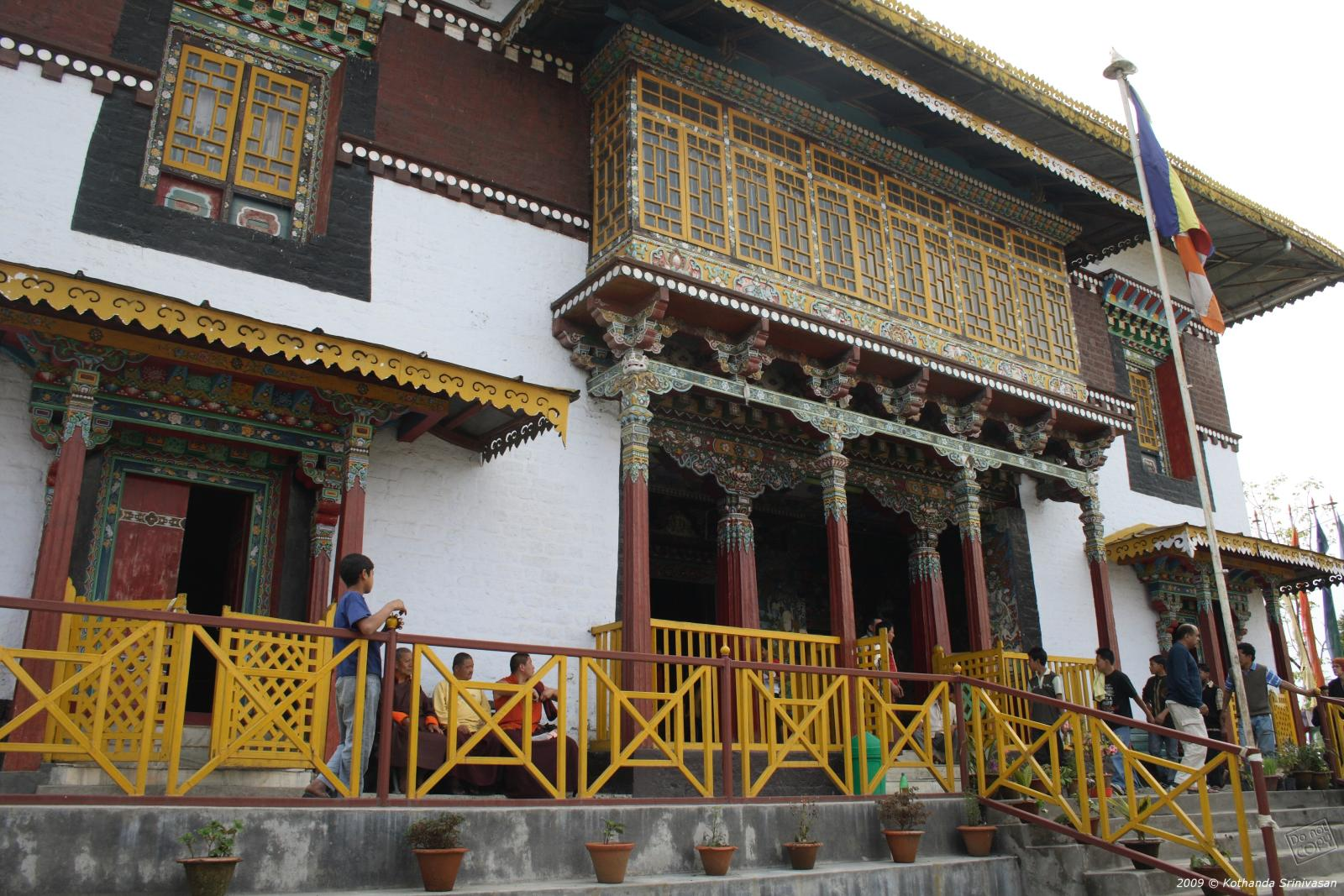
Entrance to Pemangytse Monastery

Padmasambhava's eight incarnations in fierce form are also seen here. The painting has scenes of rainbows, angels with "whole panoply of Buddhas and Bodhistvas". This structure was constructed by Dungzin Rimpoche over a period of 5 years.

== Festival ==
The Cham dance festival is held every year on the 28th and 29th day of the 12th lunar month of the Tibetan calendar, corresponding to February of the Gregorian calendar. It is performed by the lamas of this monastery. The lamas dress up as Mahākāla and Guru Drag-dmar (Sanskrit Vajrakila) in colourful costumes for the dance performance. Pilgrims from all parts of Sikkim visit the monastery to witness this festival.

On this festive occasion, which marks the conclusion of Losar, on the last day of the festival, a very large and impressive embroidered scroll is displayed. Fireworks display is also a part of the concluding function, symbolizing driving away of evil spirits. There are 108 monks in this monastery and they are identified by the red hats that they wear.

== Refurbishments and conservation ==
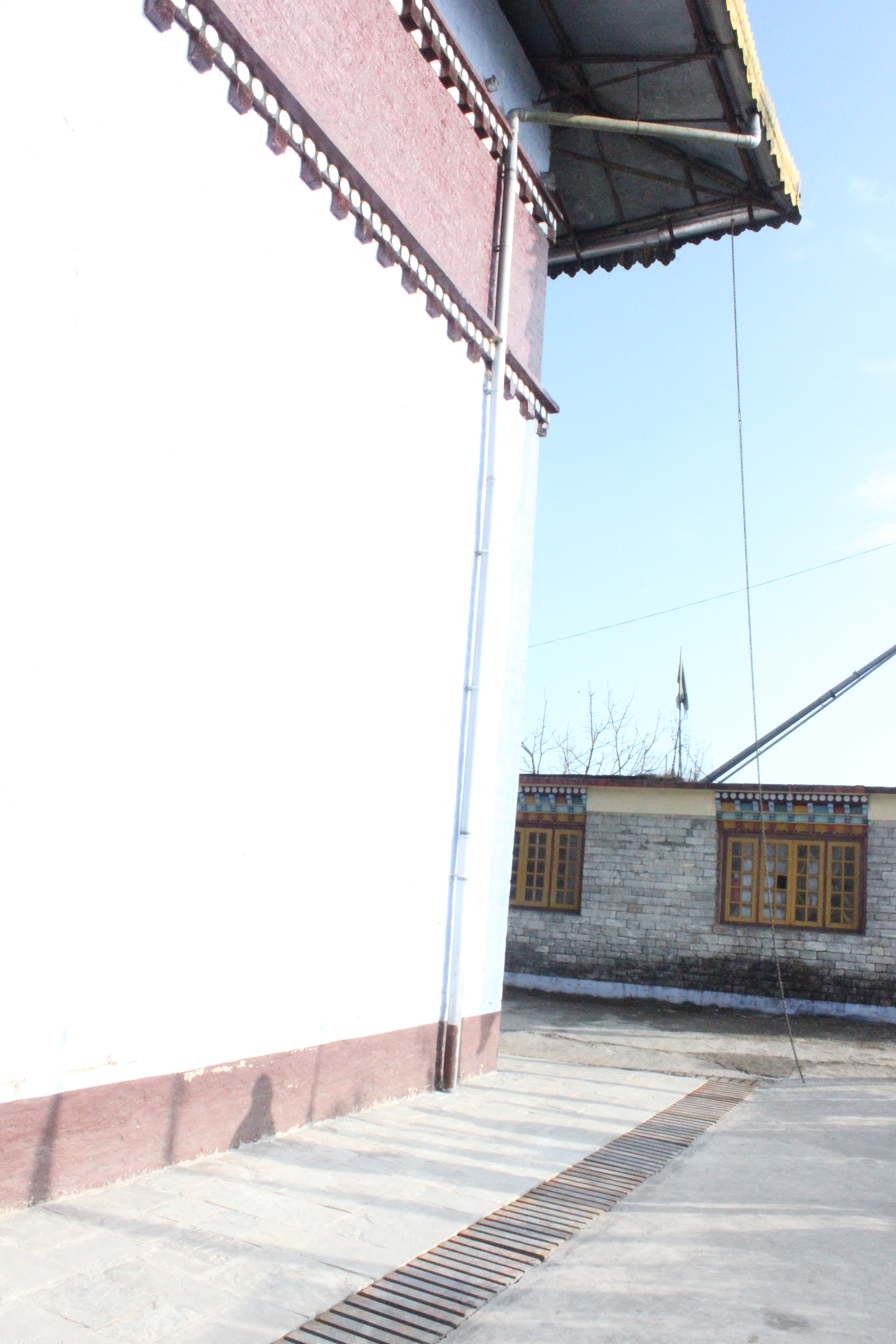
Preservation efforts at Pemayangtse Monastery

Over the centuries, the monastery has withstood earthquakes and other calamities common in high altitude areas. As a result, the monastery has been damaged time and again which can be spotted in the interiors, especially on the first floor. The Monastery has gone through series of refurbishments and preservation efforts to strengthen the structure. Most notably, on the rear left corner of the monastery, the roof was tied to chains which were then planted to solid concrete floor to enable it to withstand the monsoon winds.

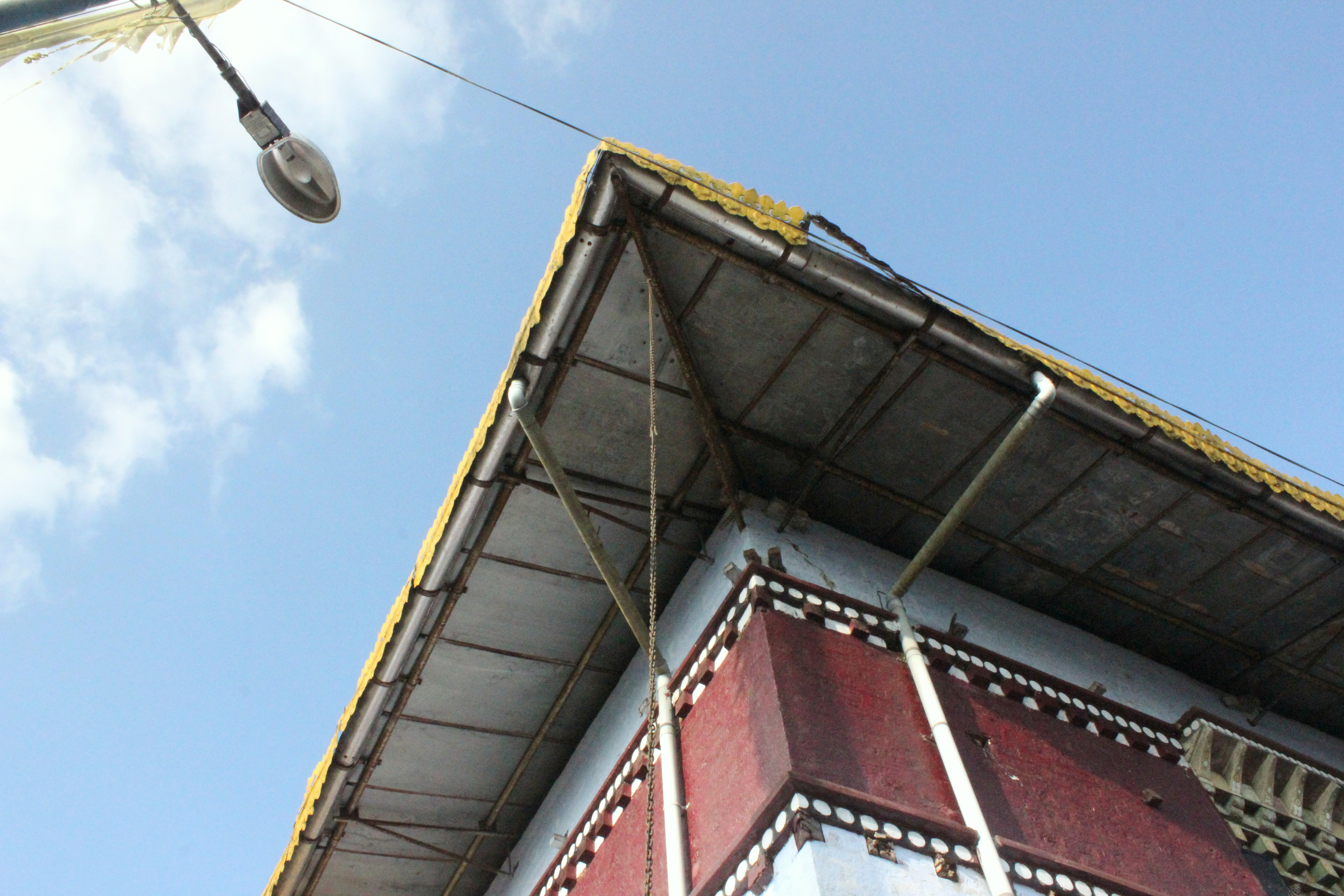
Roof chained for protection

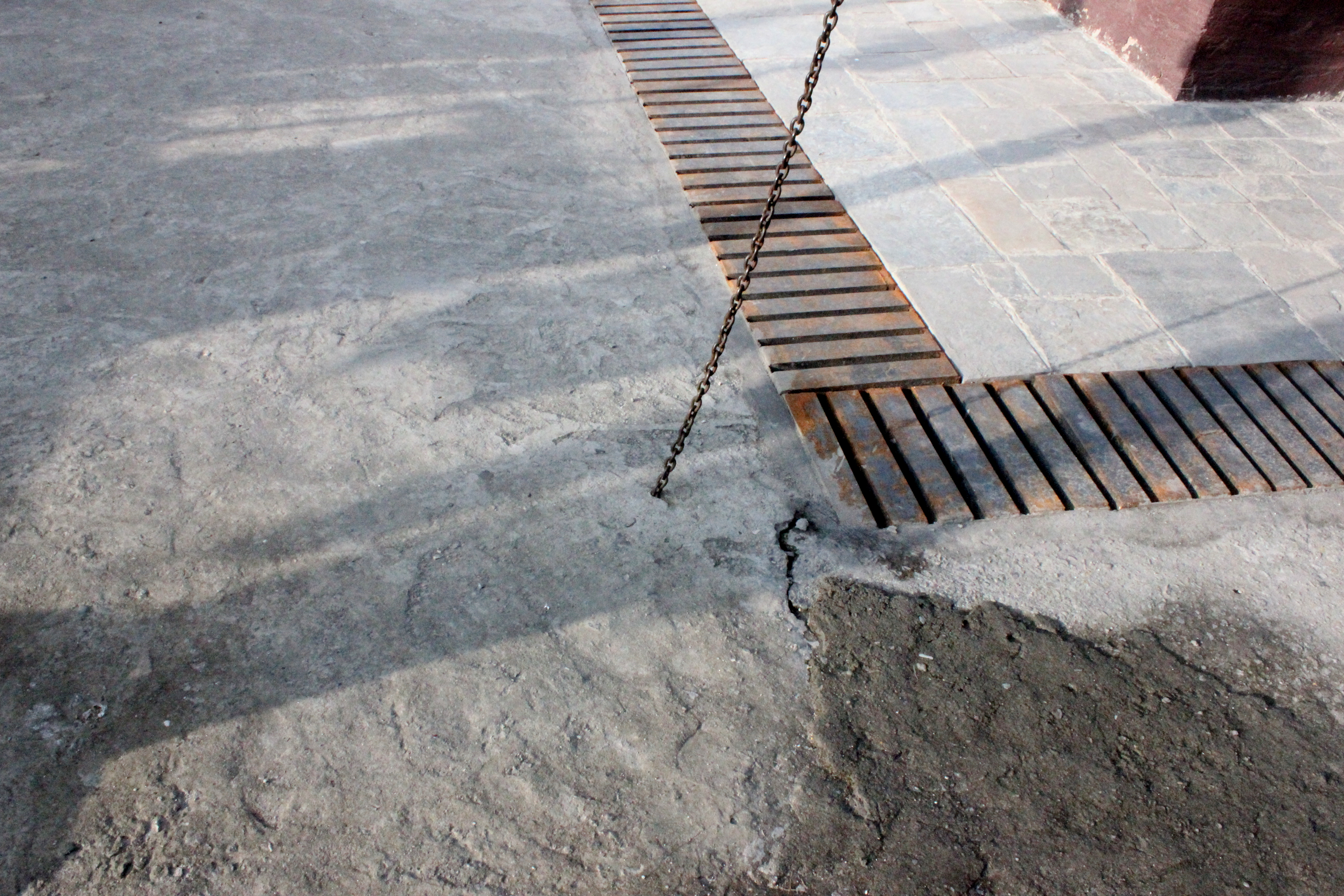
Chains planted to concrete floor

== See also ==
- Tourism in North East India
- Khandu Wangchuk Bhutia
