= Umchung =

Village in Sikkim, India

- Village
- Location in Sikkim, India Umchung (India)
- Coordinates: 27.2784°N 88.2718°E
- Country: India
- State: Sikkim
- District: Gyalshing

Area
  - Total: 223.85 ha (553.1 acres)
- Elevation: 1,225 m (4,019 ft)

Population (2011)
  - Total: 2,035
  - Density: 909.1/km^{2} (2,355/sq mi)

Languages
  - Official: Hindi, Nepali, Bhutia, Lepcha, Limbu, Newari, Rai, Gurung, Sherpa, Tamang and Sunwar
- Time zone: UTC+5:30 (IST)
- PIN: 737111
- Telephone code: 03595
- Vehicle registration: SK-02

Umchung is a census village in West Sikkim district, Sikkim, India. According to the 2011 Census of India, Umchung village has a total population of 2,035 people including 1,050 males and 985 females.
