= Hee Burmiok =

Hee Bermiok
- town
- Location in Sikkim, India Hee Bermiok (India)
- Coordinates: 27°15′21″N 88°11′0″E
- Country: India
- State: Sikkim
- District: Gyalshing

Languages
  - Official: English; Nepali; Sikkimese; Lepcha
  - Additional official: Gurung; Limbu; Magar; Mukhia; Newari; Rai; Sherpa; Tamang
- Time zone: UTC+5:30 (IST)
- Vehicle registration: SK

Hee Bermiok is a small town in West Sikkim near Pelling in India. It is known for its mountain biking, nature walks, hiking, excursions, and the traditions and customs of the Limboo, Sherpa, Bhutia, Lepcha, and Nepalis.

Martam is a small village located in west Sikkim near to Bermiok Bazar. The village is rich in Limboo traditions and customs and is famous for the Limboo community temple. The first Limboo community temple was built at Martam West Sikkim and unveil in 1996 by honorable Chief Minister Pawan Kumar Chamling.

Mahatma Teyongsi Srijunga was born in Martam and was later killed by there by the Bhutia. Every year during the full moon of December, the Limboo people celebrate the birth anniversary of Mahatma Srijunga in the temple courtyard. This is followed by Limboo dance, prayer, Puja, priest dance, and Nepali Maruni dance. Boys and girls usually wear traditional attire for the day.

The view of the Khangchendzonga mountain range can also be seen from Hee Bermiok. The village contains homestays, hotels, and a resort. Hee Bermiok is also rich in cardamom and orange plantations.
