= Chenrezig statue and skywalk =

Tourist attraction in Pelling, Sikkim

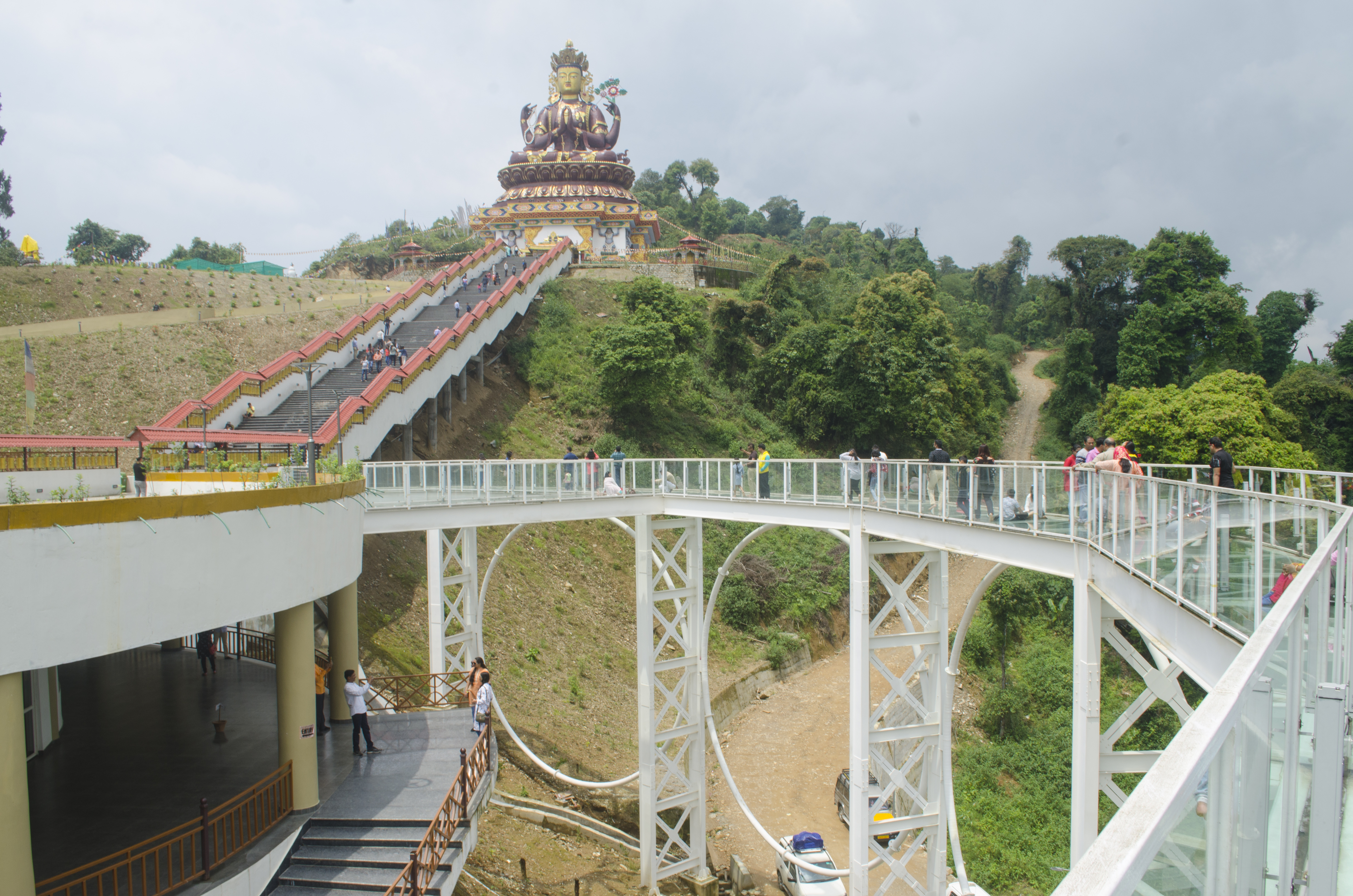
- Interactive map of Chenrezig statue and skywalk
- Location: Pelling, Sikkim, India
- Coordinates: 27.2976975°N 88.2199379°E
- Height: 137 ft (42 m)
- Opening date: November 1, 2018
- Dedicated to: Chenrezig

The Chenrezig statue and skywalk are a tourist attraction in Pelling, Gyalshing district, Sikkim. The complex houses a 137 ft (42 m) tall statue of the bodhisattva Chenrezig, the tallest Chenrezig statue in the world. The place is also the location of India's first glass skywalk. The site was inaugurated in 2018 and has since attracted significant footfall.

The glass-bottomed skywalk is situated at a height of 7,200 ft (2,200 m) above sea level, nestled in the Himalayas. It overlooks the Chenrezig statue and the flight of stairs leading up to it. There are golden prayer wheels on both sides of the stairs. The foundation stone of the Chenrezig statue was laid in 2009 and consecrated by the Dalai Lama.

The Teesta and Rangeet rivers flow near the glass walkway.

== See also ==
- List of Glass Bridge Skywalks in India
