= Khandu Wangchuk Bhutia =

Indian thangka painter

Khandu Wangchuk Bhutia is an India thangka painter from the Sikkim, known for his exquisite creative works in the Thangka style of painting. Thangka is a Tibetan Buddhist painting on cotton, silk appliqué, usually depicting a Buddhist deity, scene, or mandala. Thangkas are traditionally kept unframed and rolled up when not on display, mounted on a textile backing somewhat in the style of Chinese scroll paintings, with a further silk cover on the front. Khandu Wangchuk Bhutia hails from Sakyong in West Sikkim and had his formal education from Government Senior Secondary School in Pelling and at Senior Secondary School at Namchi. After his formal education, he was ordained into monastic life at the Pemayangtse Monastery. In the monastery, he took up Thangka painting as a profession. He trained in Thangka painting under several renowned thangka painters like Dungzin Rimpoche, late Jigme Wangchuk Lama, late Phuntsok Sangpo and late Zapa Acho.

Khandu Wangchuk Bhutia was born as the son of late Jigme Wangchuk Lama who built the Sangdopalri structure at Pemayangtse Monastery in Sikkim.

Khandu Wangchuk Bhutia has participated in several national and international seminars and exhibitions including India International Trade Fair, Delhi India (2004), Surajkand Mela in Haryana (2006), Made In NorthEast India Fair, Bangkok Thailand (2010), and Jeddah International Trade Fair, Jeddah in Saudi Arabia (EPCH) in 2014.

== Notable works ==
Khandu's notable works include Buddhist wall murals at

- Pemayangtse Monastery (Pelling)
- Boomtar Tamang Gumpa (Namchi)
- Gnadak Monastery Old (Namchi)
- Gnadak Monastery New (Namchi)
- Allay Gumpa (Ravangla)
- Tashi Choeling Monastery (Khechupalri).

== Recognition: Padma Shri ==
In the year 2022, Govt of India conferred the Padma Shri award, the third highest award in the Padma series of awards, on Khandu Wangchuk Bhutia for his distinguished service in the field of art. The award is in recognition of his service as an "Eminent Thangka painter from Sikkim specialising in traditional Buddhist paintings on cotton and silk".

== Other recognitions ==
Some of awards conferred on Khandu Wangchuk Bhutia include:

- National Award (Handicrafts) in Thangka painting (1981)
- Bharat Excellence Award as part of the Friendship Forum of India (2001)
- Kala Nidhi Award at the Surajkund Fair in Haryana (2006)
