= Rani Dhunga =

Coordinates: 27.291°N 88.171°E

Rani Dhunga, originally known as Sita Paila ("footprints of Sita"), is a huge rocky outcrop considered to be holy, in the Himalayas 6 km to the north-east of Pelling town, Sikkim, India, at an altitude of 2680m (8792 feet).

== Surroundings ==
Rani Dhunga is accessed by walking the steep hilly track through the surrounding forest covering the area. Animals such as musk deer, Himalayan tahr, wild boar, Himalayan black bear and Himalayan blue sheep all make their home in this forest. On the way to Rani Dhunga lies the Sanga Choeling Monastery, established in the 17th century by Lama Lhatsün Chempo. One of the oldest monasteries in the north-east Indian state of Sikkim, it is known for "Guhyamantra teachings", or "secret Mantra teachings", a synonym for Vajrayana Buddhism.

== Etymology ==
According to folklore, the name "Rani Dhunga" means "queen's rock" ("rani" means "queen" and "dhunga" means "rock" or "stone".)

== Legends ==
The legend or mythology relating to this huge rock is that Devi Sita (an expansion of Lord Rama) once stepped on the rock and her footprints can be seen embedded on it.

Another folk legend is that a long time ago this place used to be a hiding cave for the Queen of Sikkim when the kingdom was attacked by Nepal or Bhutan.

== Climate ==
The climate prevailing in the area is that of the monsoon. The maximum and minimum temperatures recorded are 24 °C (75 °F) and 0 °C (39 °F). Cold winds blow in the winter straight from the Himalayan ranges sometimes bringing snow with them and hail.

== Gallery ==
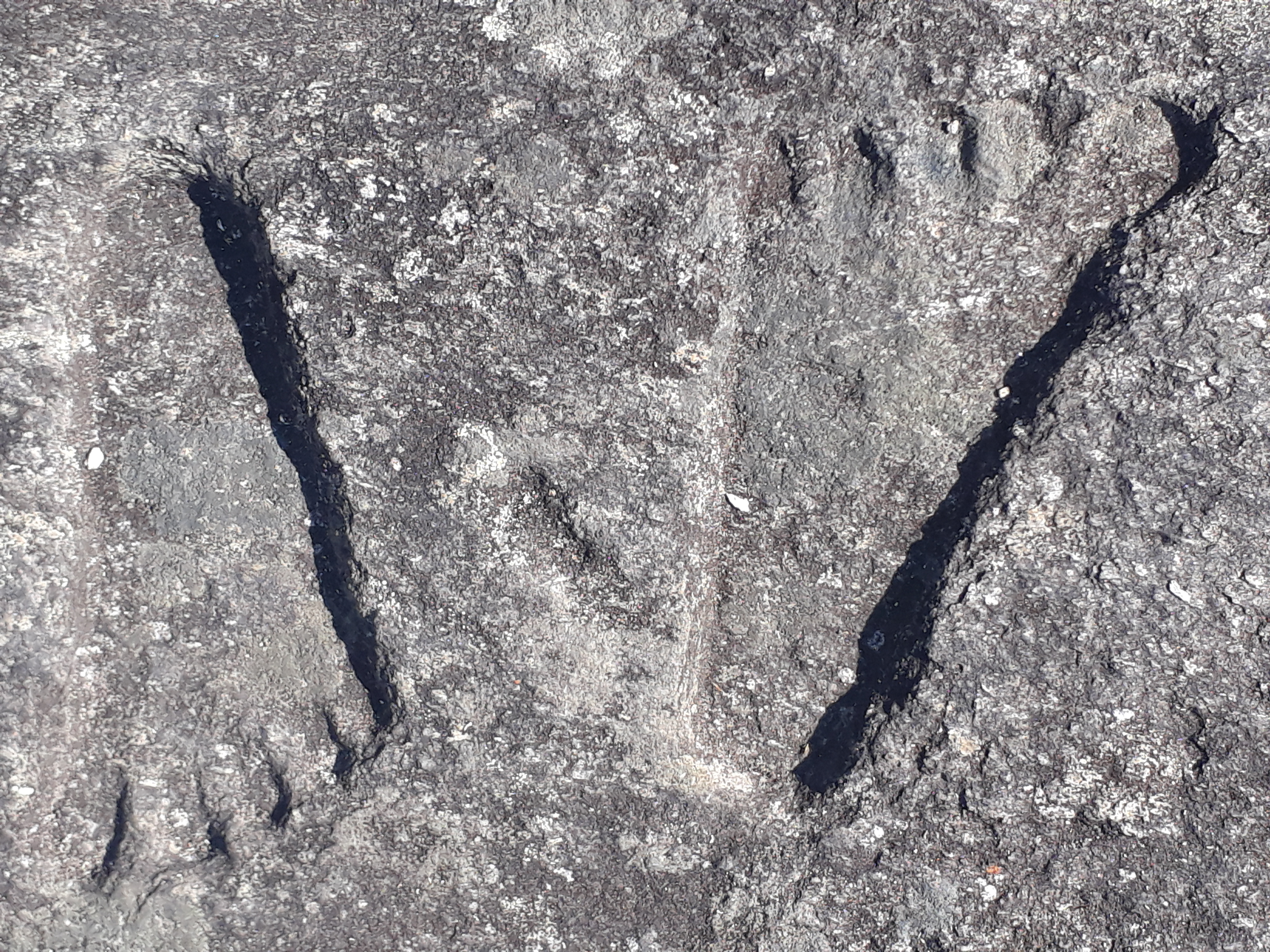
Sita Paila (embedded footprints of Devi Sita)

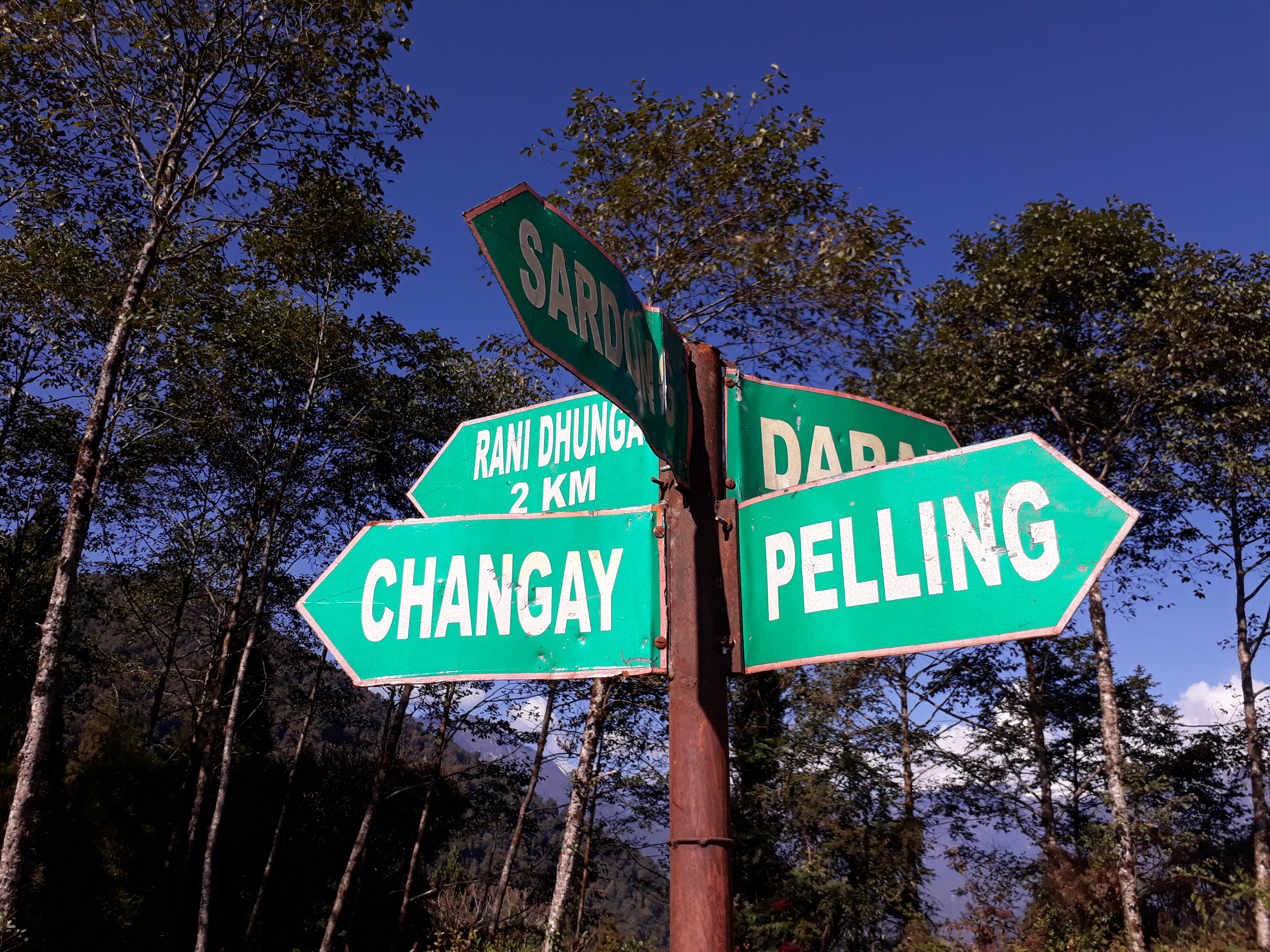
Milepost

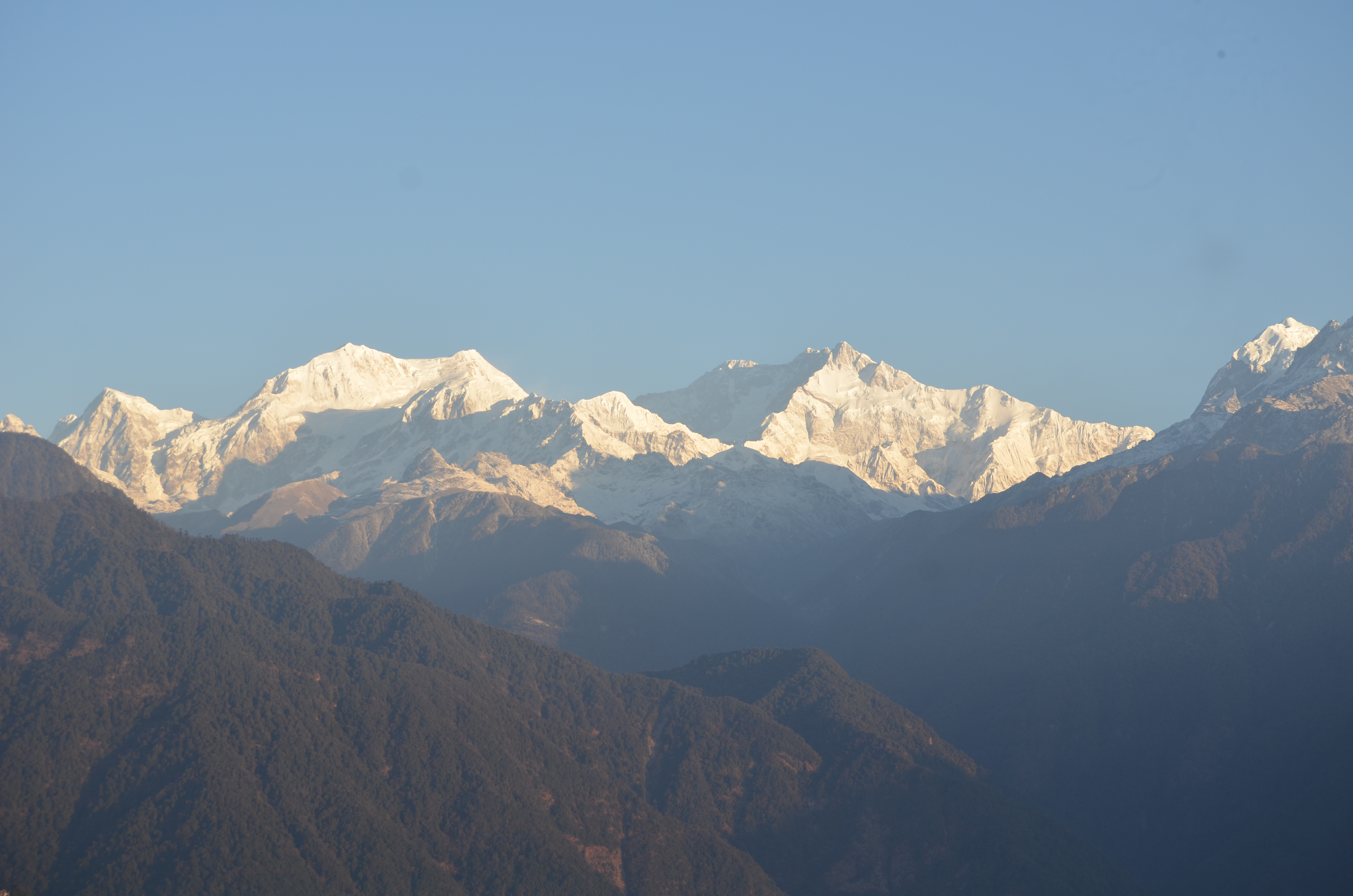
View of Mt Kanchenjunga on the way to Sita Paila

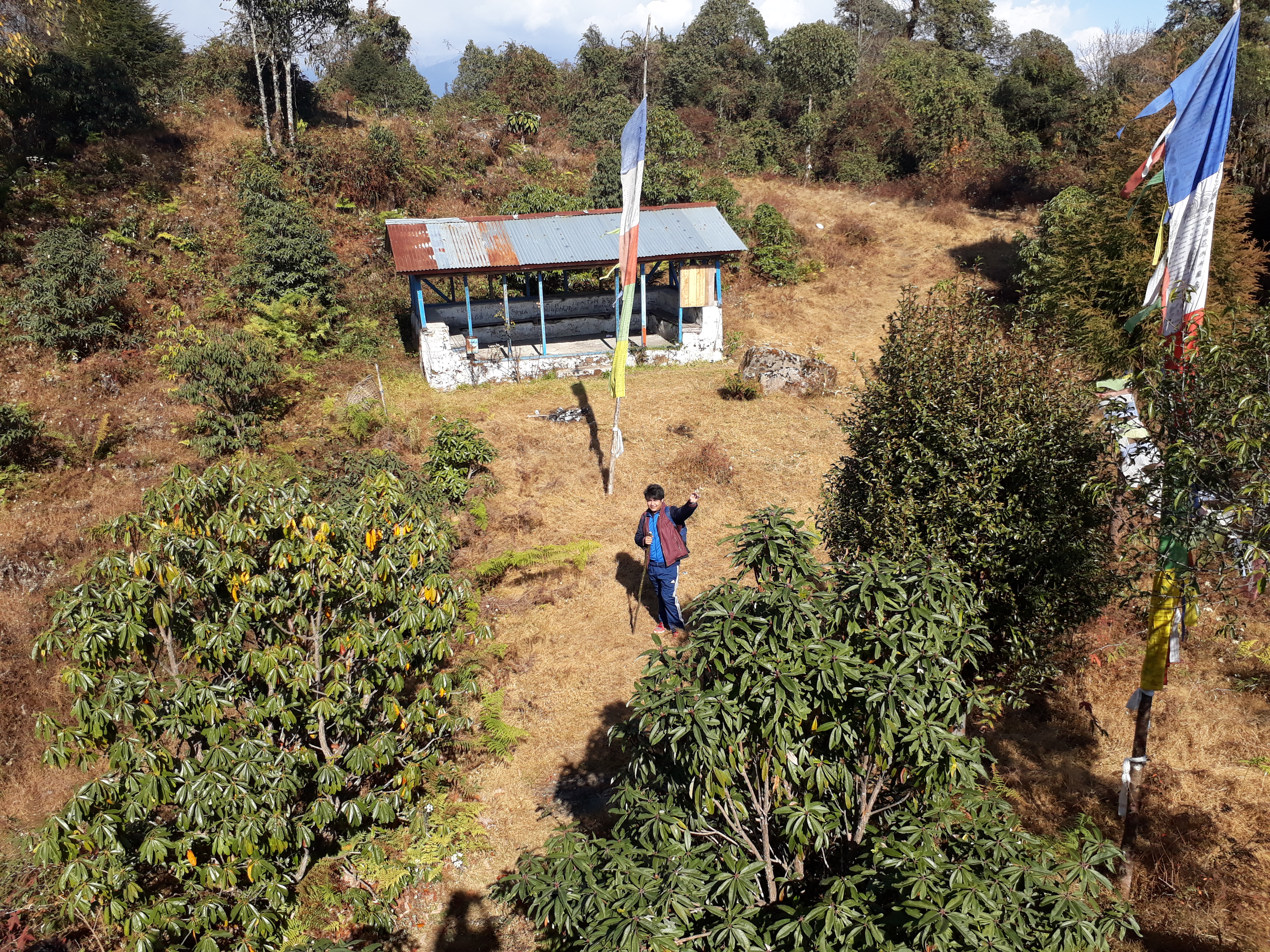
The top of Rani Dhunga
