= Pelling =

- Hill Station
- Location in Sikkim, India Pelling (India)
- Coordinates: 27.18°N 88.14°E
- Country: India
- State: Sikkim
- District: Gyalshing
- Elevation: 1,800 m (5,900 ft)

Languages
  - Official: English; Nepali; Sikkimese; Lepcha
  - Additional official: Gurung; Limbu; Magar; Mukhia; Newari; Rai; Sherpa; Tamang
- Time zone: UTC+5:30 (IST)
- PIN: 737 113
- Telephone code: 03595
- Vehicle registration: SK

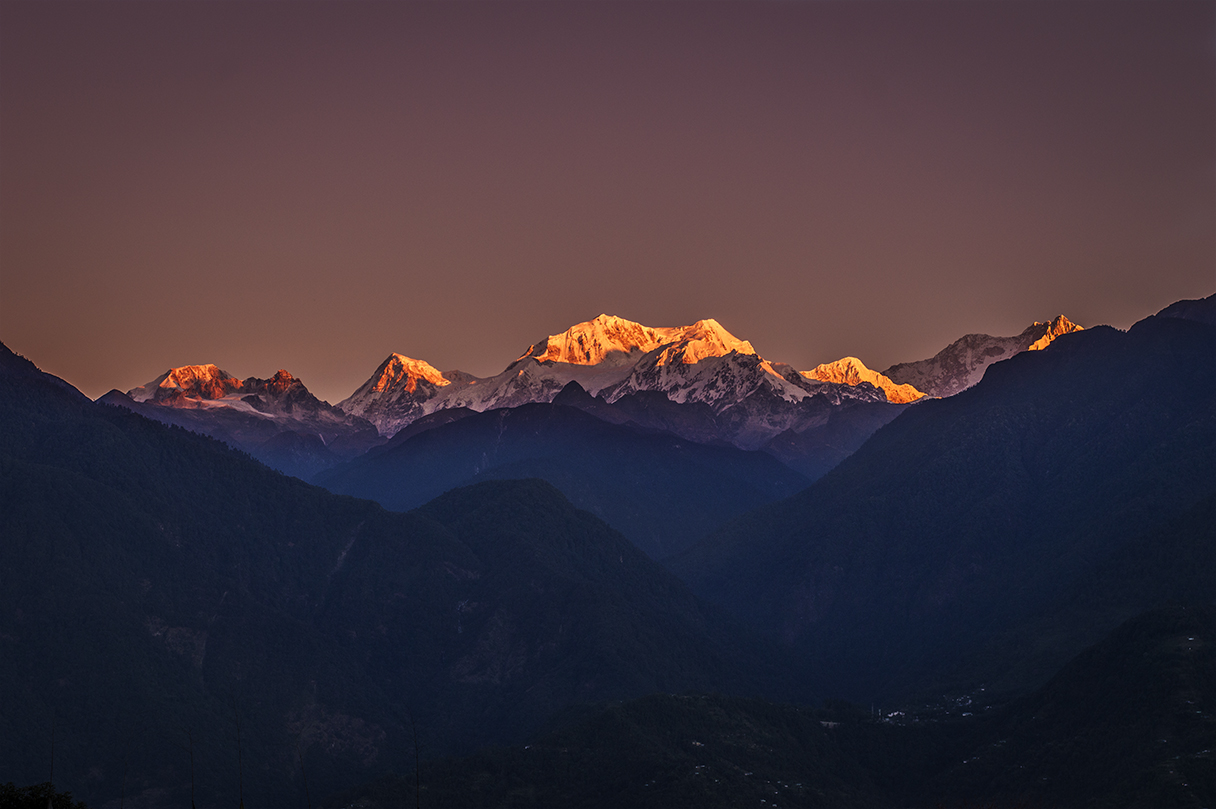
Sunrise over the Mount Kangchenjunga at Pelling, Sikkim, India.

Pelling (པད་གླིང་། ) is a hill station in ( རྒྱལ་ཤིང་རྫོང་།) Gyalshing district of Sikkim, India. Pelling is nestled at an altitude of 2,150 m (7,050 ft). The town is located at a distance of 10 km from Gyalshing city, the district headquarters and 131 km from Gangtok. A regular bus service connects the two towns. However, with the influx of tourists, the region is undergoing a metamorphosis, with the roads being repaired and hotels being set up.

== Location and surroundings ==
The Himalayas and the Kanchenjanga may be viewed at close quarters from Pelling. Pelling also forms the base from where trekkers and other peripatetic adventurers undertake the strenuous and arduous treks in West Sikkim. The land around Pelling is still a virgin territory and is bathed with alpine vegetation, with numerous waterfalls lining the hillside. In the months of winter, Pelling is sometimes covered with a blanket of snow.

Pelling is 115 km from the state capital Gangtok and about 135 km from Siliguri, the nearest railhead and airport. Regular jeeps connect Pelling to the towns of Jorethang, Kalimpong and Namchi. The nearest airport is Bagdogra airport.

Most of the people of Pelling are Buddhists and speak the Sikkimese language. Other languages spoken are Nepali, Hindi, and English.

== Tourist attractions ==
Places to visit in and around Pelling include the local monasteries, rock garden, waterfall, the holy rock of Rani Dhunga, the imposing double-pronged Kanchenjungha Falls, the archaic quaint Singshore Bridge, the Changey Waterfalls, and the Khecheopalri Lake holy to Buddhists.

Rabdentse Palace Ruins - Rabdentse was the second capital of the former Kingdom of Sikkim from 1670 to 1814. The capital city was destroyed by the invading Gurkha army and only the ruins of the palace and the chortens are seen here now. However, the ruins of this city are seen close to Pelling and in West Sikkim district in the Northeastern Indian state of present-day Sikkim; Pemayangtse Monastery is one of the oldest monasteries in Sikkim which is close to the ruins.

Pemayangtse Monastery - It was built in 1705 located in Pemayangtse (2 km from Pelling). The Buddhist monastery was founded by Lama Lhatsun Chempo. Built as a three storied structure, the monastery depicts paintings on its walls and statues of saints and Rinpoches, deified in various floors.

Darap Village - A small village about 7 km on the way to Yuksom. It is mostly occupied by the Limbu tribe including small populations of other communities as well.

Rimbi Waterfall - Situated 5 km from Darap en route to Khecheopalri. It is the oldest in West Sikkim being constructed in early 70s during the reign of the last Sikkimese King. The state government has developed the Sewaro Rock Garden here which is complete with rocks, pathways, pools, manicured gardens etc.

Kanchenjunga Falls - Further 18 km from Rimbi River and about 28 km from Pelling. It is one of the most beautiful waterfalls in Sikkim and is normally active throughout the year.

Changey Waterfall - 10 km from Pelling.

Sanga Choeling Monastery - Situated on a ridge above Pelling and overlooking the famous Pemayangtse Monastery. Built in 1697 AD, it is considered to be one of the oldest monasteries in the State.

Pelling Sky Walk and Chenrezig Statue - A new attraction near Sanga Choeling is the gigantic 137 ft (42 m) statue of Chenrezig (Avalokitesvara) and a transparent Sky Walk made of glass that leads to the statue. It was opened in November 2018 and since then it has attracted significant footfall.

Other locations close to Pelling are Yuksom, Rinchenpong, Dzongri and Hee Burmiok.

Singshore Bridge - Singshore Bridge is located around 26 km away from Pelling. The bridge has a height of over 100 m and 240 m in length, is the highest bridge in Sikkim and the second highest bridge in Asia.

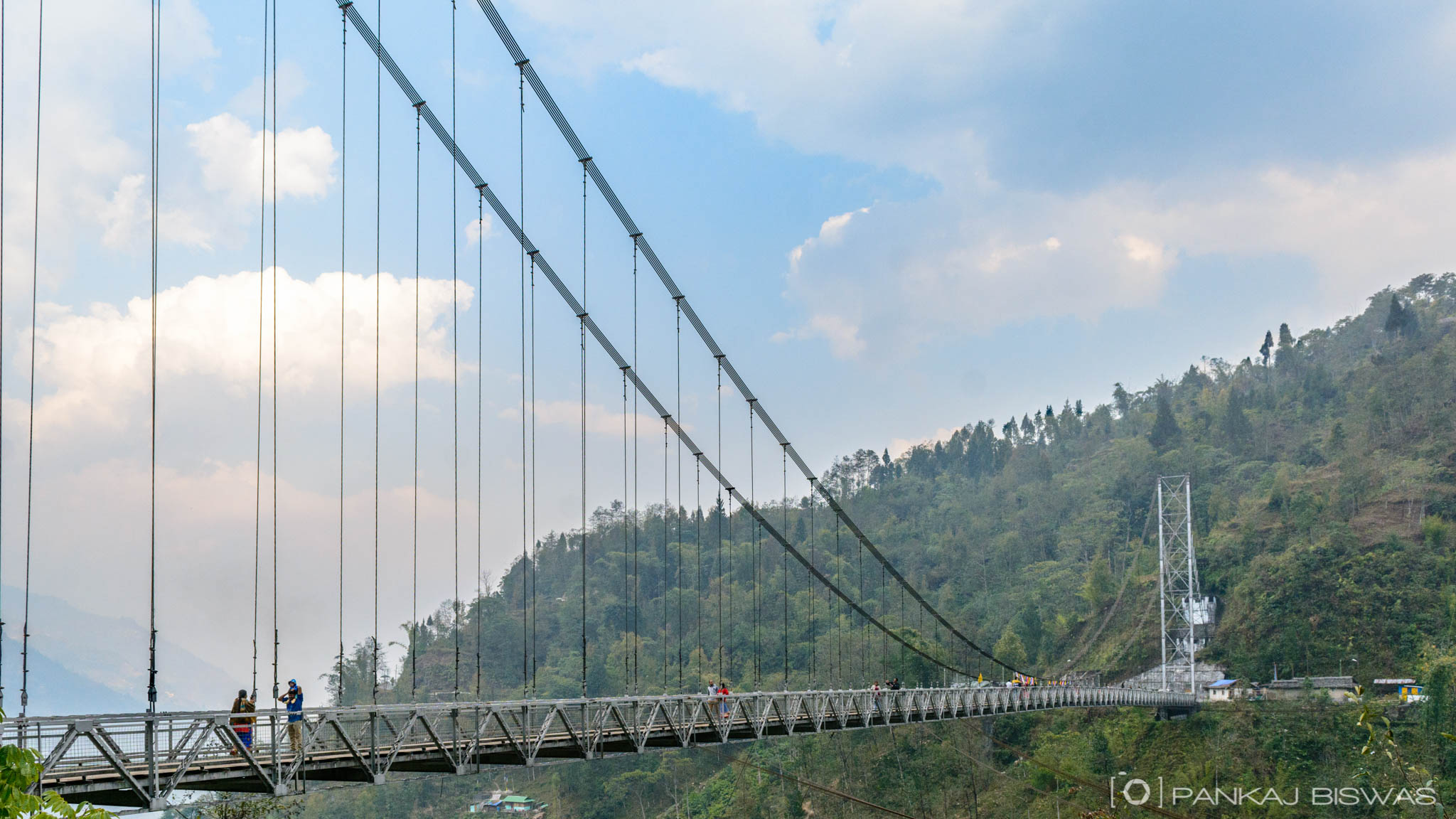
Singshore Bridge, Pelling

== Pelling Helipad ==
Pelling Helipad
- Pelling Helipad
- IATA: none; ICAO: none

Summary
- Airport type: Public
- Location: Pelling, Sikkim
- Elevation AMSL: 7,200 ft (2,200 m)
- Coordinates: 27°18′00″N 88°14′00″E
- Interactive map of Pelling Helipad

Helipads
Number	Length		Surface
Number	ft	m	Surface
H			Asphalt concrete

Pelling has a helipad ground though there is no regular air service. Helicopters can connect Pelling with Gangtok on request and in emergency.

== Education Institutes ==
Government Senior Secondary School.
