= Gyalshing =

Gyalshing Geyzing
- City
- Location of Gyalshing in Sikkim Gyalshing (India)
- Coordinates: 27.28°N 88.27°E
- Country: India
- State: Sikkim
- District: Gyalshing or Geyzing

Government
  - Type: Nagar Panchayat
- Elevation: 823 m (2,700 ft)

Population (2011)
  - Total: 4,013

Languages
  - Official: English; Nepali; Sikkimese; Lepcha
  - Additional official: Gurung; Limbu; Magar; Mukhia; Newari; Rai; Sherpa; Tamang
- Time zone: UTC+5:30 (IST)
- PIN: 737 111
- Telephone code: 03595
- Vehicle registration: SK-02

Gyalshing (also Geyzing, Nepali pronunciation: [ɡed͡ziŋ]) is a city, located in Gyalshing district, in the Indian state of Sikkim. It is administrative headquarter of district. The town is connected to the capital Gangtok by a metalled road. Geyzing is also connected to the West Bengal towns of Darjeeling and Kalimpong via Jorethang. A few kilometres north is the town of Pelling. The town has a large Nepali population, and the Nepali language is the predominant language of the region. The town is situated at an altitude of about 6,500 feet (1,900 m). The town enjoys a temperate climate for most of the year and snow sometimes falls in the vicinity.

Near Geyzing is the ancient town of Yuksom, the ancient capital of Sikkim built in 1642. Other attractions include Pemyangtse Monastery built in 1640, reputed to be Sikkim's oldest and Khecheopalri Lake which as legend has it not a leaf is allowed to float on the surface. The town is the base for trekking in the Himalayas and professional expeditions to Mount Kanchenjunga.

Geyzing has a couple of English medium schools including a convent school and a major hospital. It also has the district's only three star hotel The TashiGang hotel owned by the Bollywood actor Danny Denzongpa.

== Geography ==
Gyalshing is located at 27.28°N 88.27°E. It has an average elevation of 823 metres (2700 feet).

== Demographics ==
As per the 2011 census of India, Gyalshing had a population of 828. Males constitute 59% of the population and females 41%. Gyalshing has an average literacy rate of 72%, higher than the national average of 59.5%: male literacy is 75%, and female literacy is 68%. In Gyalshing, 9% of the population is under 6 years of age.

=== Religion ===
Religious Demographic in Gyalshing Nagar Panchayat (2011)
1. Hinduism (59.4%)
2. Buddhism (27.5%)
3. Islam (6.98%)
4. Christianity (5.68%)
5. Others (0.47%)

=== Languages ===
Languages spoken in Gyalshing Nagar Panchayat (2011)
1. Nepali (47.3%)
2. Bhutia (16.3%)
3. Hindi (11.8%)
4. Bhojpuri (6.37%)
5. Urdu (4.68%)
6. Limbu (4.33%)
7. Bengali (2.26%)
8. Tamang (1.86%)
9. Lepcha (1.47%)
10. Sherpa (1.44%)
11. Others (2.14%)

== Educational institutions ==
The town is developing educational institutes. One recently established college i.e. Gyalshing Government College is in the vicinity of the town.
