= Khangchendzonga National Park =

Protected area and UNESCO World Heritage Site in Sikkim, India

- IUCN category II (national park)
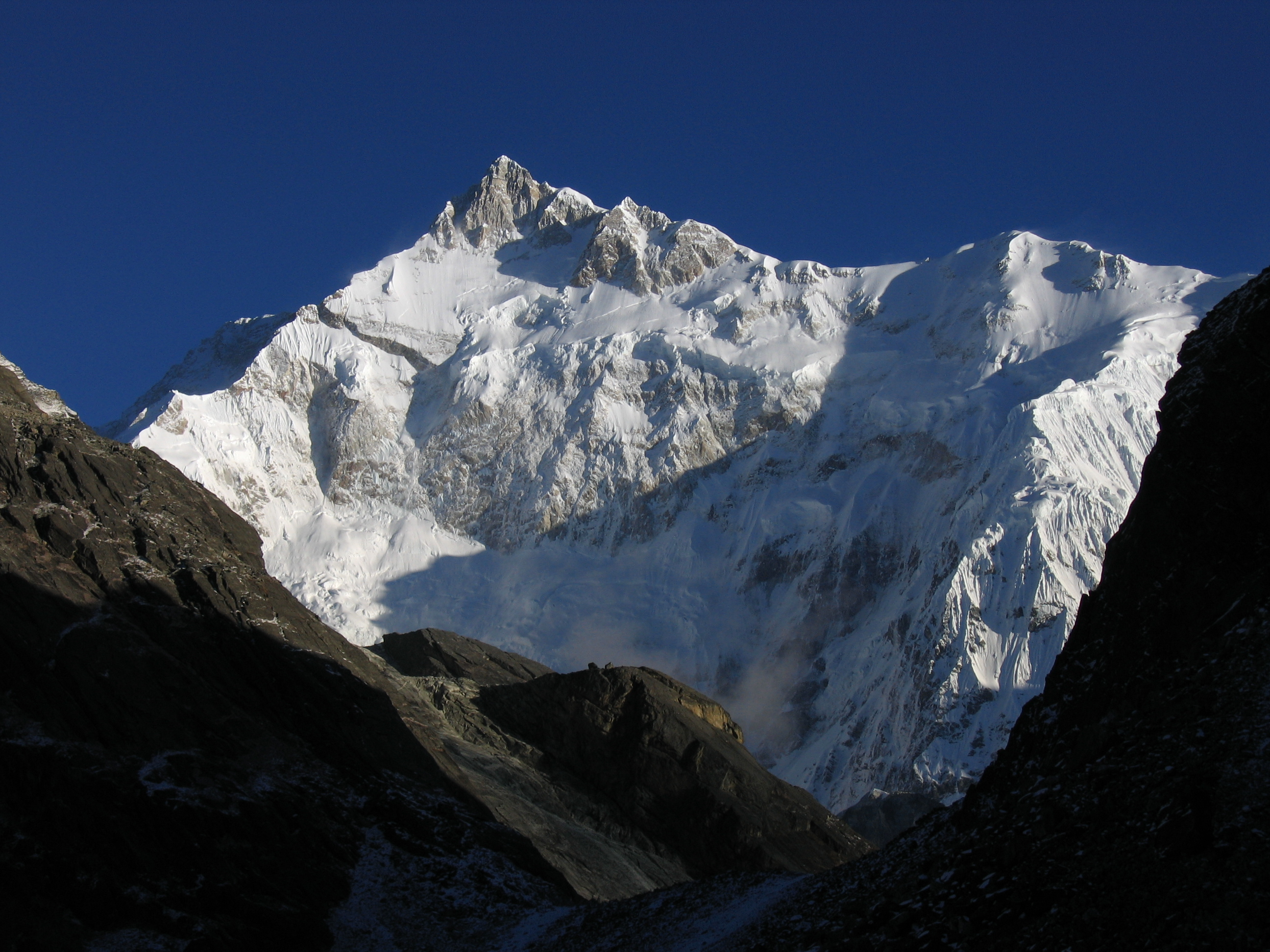
- Mount Kanchenjunga from Goecha La pass, Khangchendzonga National Park, Sikkim

- Location within Sikkim Location within India
- Interactive map of Khangchendzonga National Park
- Location: Mangan district and Gyalshing district, Sikkim, India
- Nearest town: Chungthang
- Coordinates: 27°39′22.7″N 88°18′44.3″E
- Area: 1,784 km^{2} (689 sq mi)
- Established: 1977; 49 years ago
- Governing body: Ministry of Environment and Forests, Government of India

UNESCO World Heritage Site
- Type: Mixed
- Criteria: iii, vi, vii, x
- Designated: 2016 (40th session)
- Reference no.: 1513

Khangchendzonga National Park is a national park and part of the Khangchendzonga Biosphere Reserve in Sikkim, India. It was inscribed to the UNESCO World Heritage Sites list in July 2016, becoming the first "Mixed Heritage" site of India. It was included in the UNESCO Man and the Biosphere Programme. The park is named after the mountain Kangchenjunga, which is the third-highest peak in the world at 8,586 m (28,169 ft) tall. The total area of the park is 1,784 km^{2} (689 sq mi).

== Geography ==
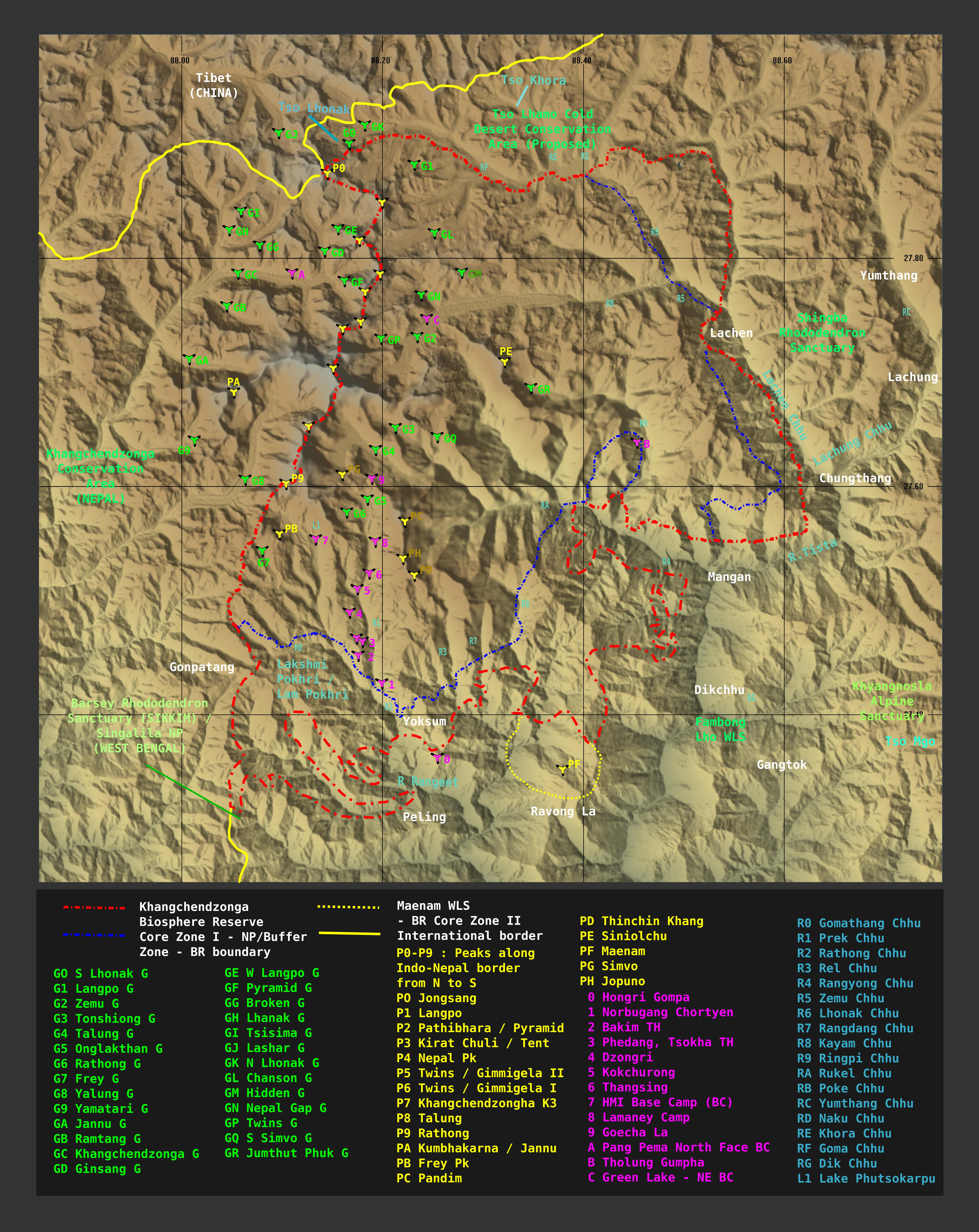
Map of the Indian protected areas of the Kangchenjunga Biosphere Reserve and National Park

Khangchendzonga National Park covers an area of 1,784 km^{2} (689 sq mi) in Mangan district and Gyalshing district at an elevation of 1,829 m (6,001 ft) to over 8,550 m (28,050 ft). It is one of the few high-altitude national parks of India and was designated as a mixed-criteria UNESCO World Heritage Site in July 2016.

In the north, it adjoins Qomolangma National Nature Preserve in Tibet, and in the west Kanchenjunga Conservation Area in Nepal.

== Flora ==
The vegetation of the park include temperate broadleaf and mixed forests consisting of oaks, fir, birch, maple and willow. Alpine grasses and shrubs occur at higher elevations along with many medicinal plants and herbs.

== Fauna ==
About 550 species of birds occur in the park including blood pheasant, satyr tragopan, osprey, Himalayan griffon, lammergeier, several species of green pigeon, Tibetan snowcock, snow pigeon, impeyan pheasant, Asian emerald cuckoo, sunbirds and eagles. The dhole has been recorded by camera traps at elevations of 2,501–4,100 m (8,205–13,451 ft). Six cat species live in the park: Indian leopard, clouded leopard, snow leopard, jungle cat, Asian golden cat, and leopard cat. Other mammals include Indian jackal, Himalayan wolf, large Indian civet, red panda, Himalayan goral, bharal, Himalayan tahr, mainland serow, alpine musk deer, black musk deer, and northern red muntjac.
