= Gyalshing district =

- District
- Geyzing district
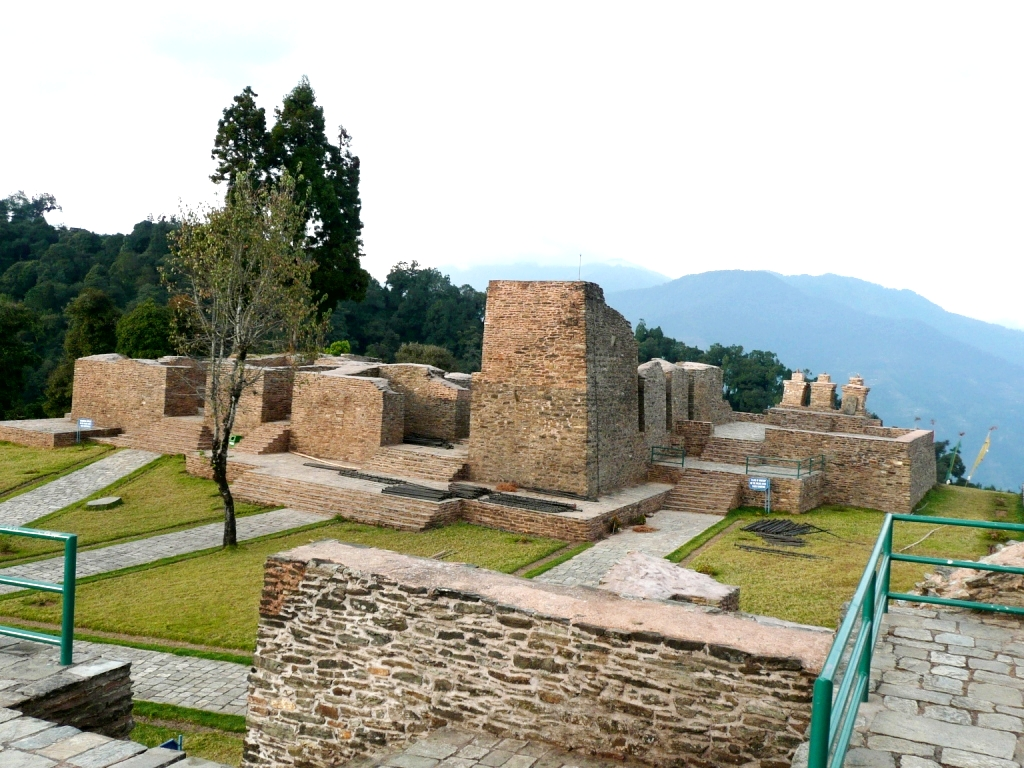
- Rabdentse Palace in Rabdentse in Gyalshing district, Sikkim

- Location in Sikkim
- Coordinates: 27°17′N 88°15′E
- Country: India
- State: Sikkim
- Headquarters: Gyalshing or Geyzing

Government
  - District Collector (DC): Smt Yishey D. Yongda

Population (2011)
  - Total: 71,675
- Time zone: UTC+05:30 (IST)
- ISO 3166 code: IN-SK
- Vehicle registration: SK-02, SK-06
- Website: gyalshing.nic.in

Gyalshing district or Geyzing district is a district of the Indian state of Sikkim. Its headquarter is Geyzing, also known as Gyalshing. The district is a favourite among trekkers due to the high elevations. Other important towns include Pelling and Yuksom. Local people also call it as Pallo-Sikkim and Sano-Sikkim commonly.

== History ==
Gyalshing district is the site of the ancient state capital Yuksom. It served as Sikkim's capital beginning in 1642 for almost 50 years until it was shifted to Rabdentse. The district was under the occupation of the Nepalese for 30 years in the eighteenth and nineteenth centuries. After Anglo-Nepalese War (1814–16), the district was returned to Sikkim.

== Geography ==
Gyalshing district covers an area of 1,166 square kilometres (450 sq mi). Attractions include the Khecheopalri Lake, where, according to legend, not a leaf is allowed to fall on the surface of the lake and the Dubdi Monastery, the first monastery of the state.

== Assembly constituencies ==
The district was previously divided into 5 assembly constituencies.

- Yoksam-Tashiding (BL)
- Yangthang
- Maneybung-Dentam
- Gyalshing-Barnyak
- Rinchenpong (BL)

=== National protected area ===
- Khangchendzonga National Park (Part)

== Economy ==
The economy is mainly agrarian, despite most of the land being unfit for cultivation owing to the precipitous and rocky slopes.

== Transport ==
Roads are in poor condition owing to the frequent landslides.

== Demographics ==
According to the 2011 census Gyalshing district has a population of 136,435, roughly equal to the nation of Grenada. This gives it a ranking of 608th in India (out of a total of 640). The district has a population density of 117 inhabitants per square kilometre (300/sq mi) . Its population growth rate over the decade 2001-2011 was 10.58%. It has a sex ratio of 941 females for every 1000 males, and a literacy rate of 78.69%.

After bifurcation the district had a population of 71,675. 5.60% of the population lives in urban areas. Scheduled Castes and Scheduled Tribes made up 3,391 (4.73%) and 31,847 (44.43%) of the population respectively.

The people are mainly of Limbu descent. Other ethnic groups include the Lepcha and Bhutia communities. Nepali is the most widely spoken language in the district.

=== Religion ===
Religion in Gyalshing district (2011)
| Hinduism | 60.07% |
| Buddhism | 25.99% |
| Other (mainly Kirat Mundhum) | 6.73% |
| Christianity | 6.06% |
| Islam | 0.94% |
| Other or not stated | 0.21% |

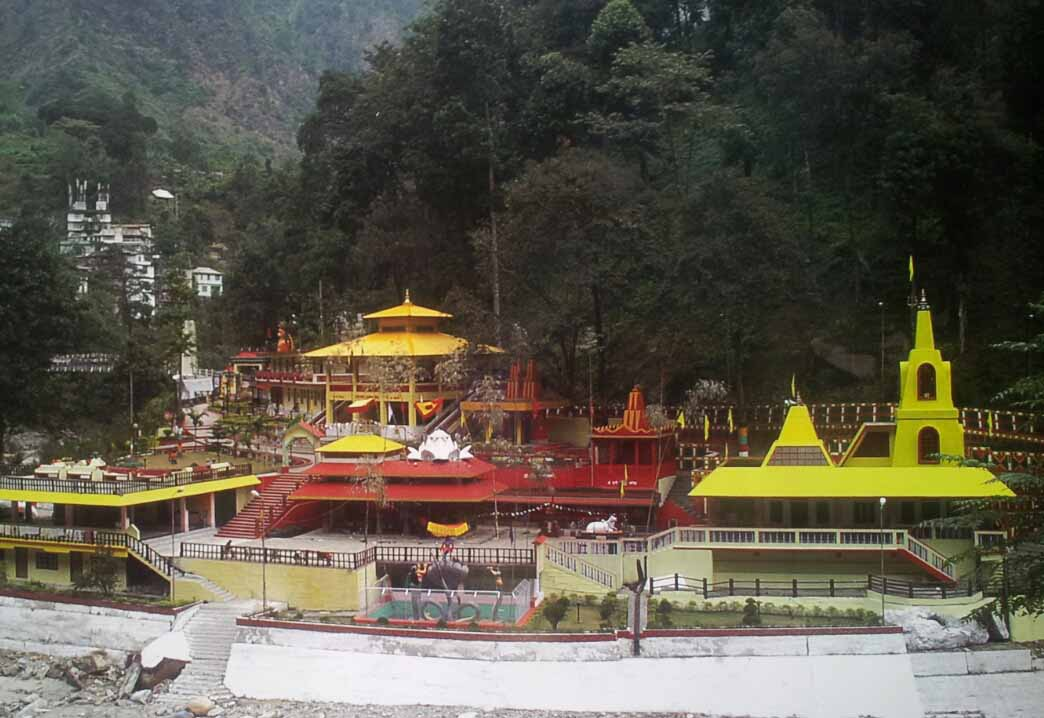
Kirateshwar Mahadev Temple

Hinduism is followed by majority of the people in the district. Buddhism followed by a considerable population.

The Kirateshwar Mahadev Temple, a major Hindu pilgrimage centre in Sikkim, is situated in Legship in the district.

=== Languages ===
Languages of Gyalshing district (2011)
1. Nepali (51.9%)
2. Limbu (22.6%)
3. Lepcha (8.68%)
4. Bhotia (7.05%)
5. Sherpa (2.69%)
6. Rai (1.55%)
7. Hindi (1.48%)
8. Others (4.09%)

At the time of the 2011 Census of India, 51.85% of the population in the district spoke Nepali, 22.61% Limbu, 8.68% Lepcha, 7.05% Bhotia, 2.69% Sherpa, 1.55% Rai and 1.48% Hindi as their first language.

== Flora and fauna ==
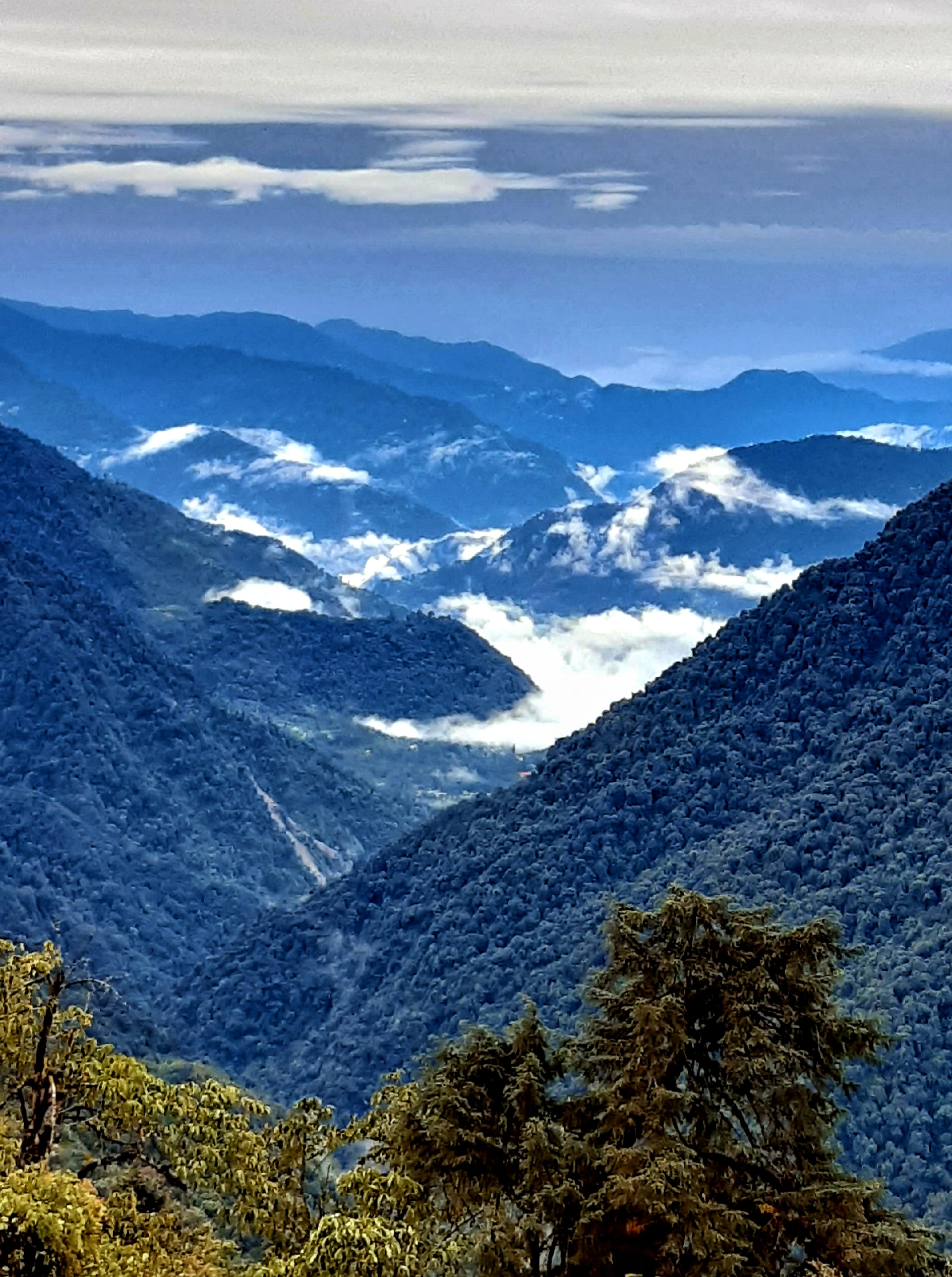
Natural view of mountain ranges in Gyalshing district

Gyalshing district houses a great diversity of flora and fauna, many of which are used by Indigenous and local communities. Since most of the district is hilly it enjoys a temperate climate. Above 3,800 m (12,000 ft) the slopes are full of rhododendron forests.

In 1977, the district became home to Khangchendzonga National Park, which has an area of 1,784 km^{2} (688.8 mi^{2}). It shares the park with North Sikkim district.

== Divisions ==
=== Administrative divisions ===
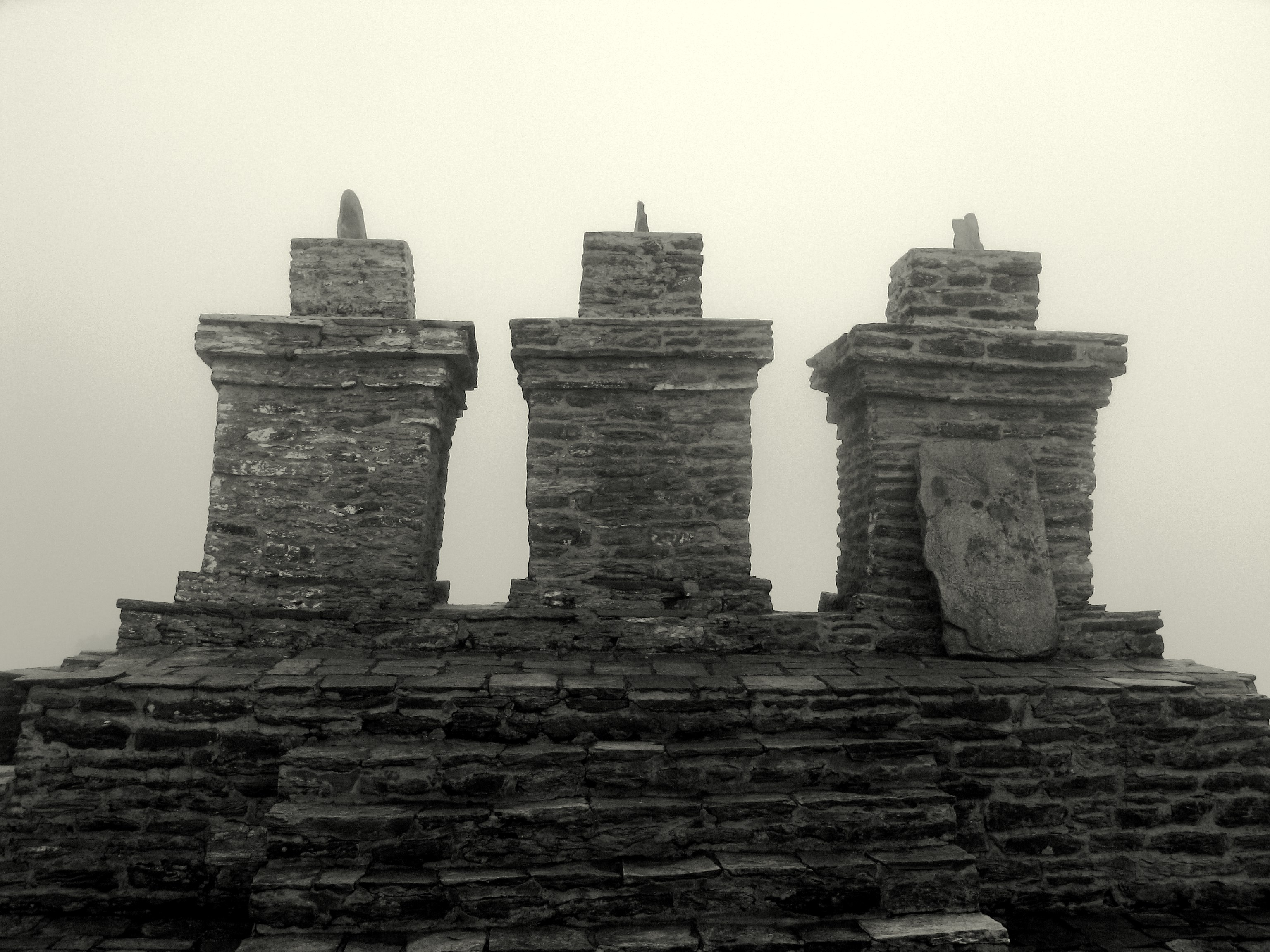
Three chortens in Rabendtse

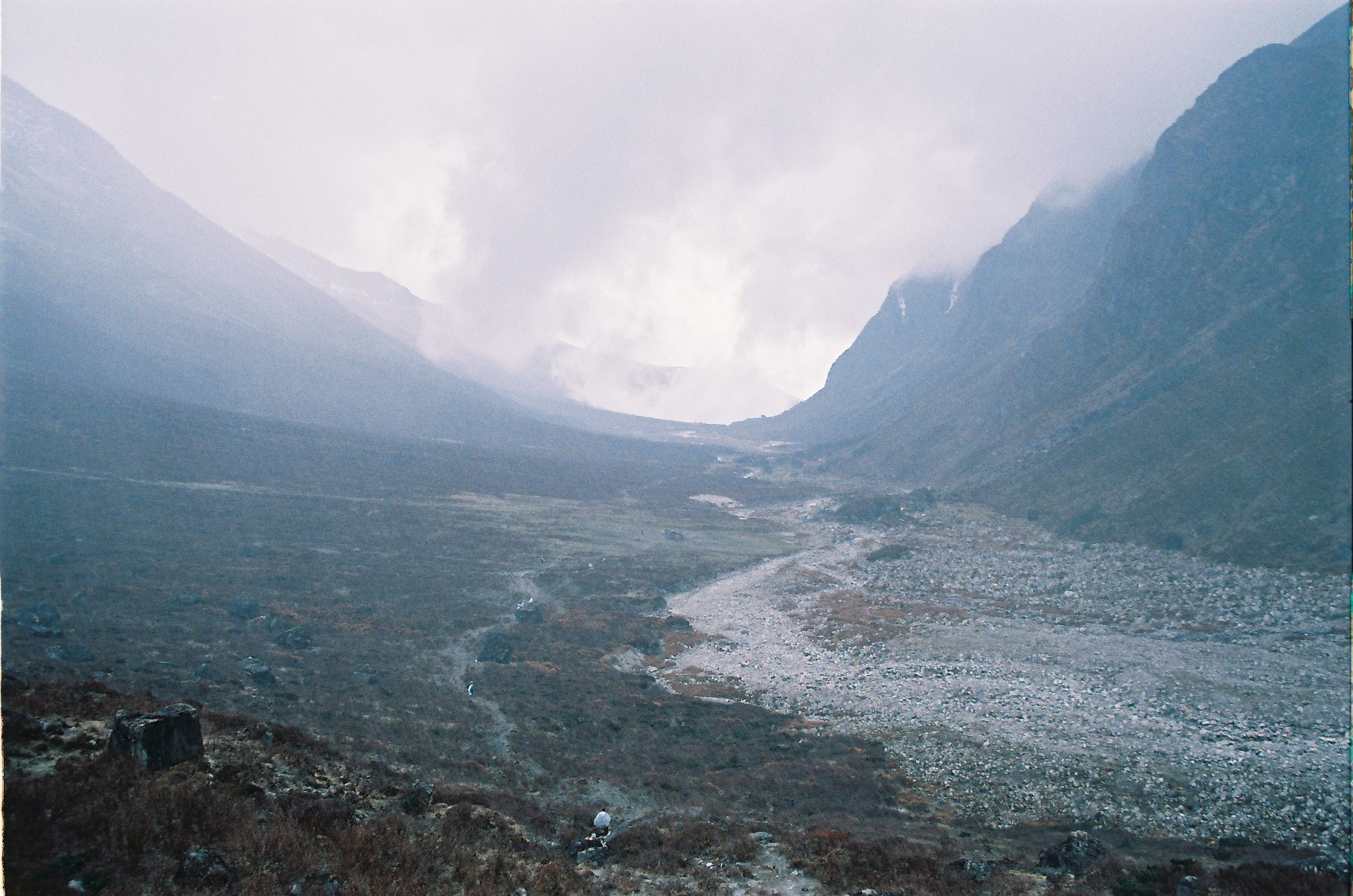
Glacier valley near Thangshing

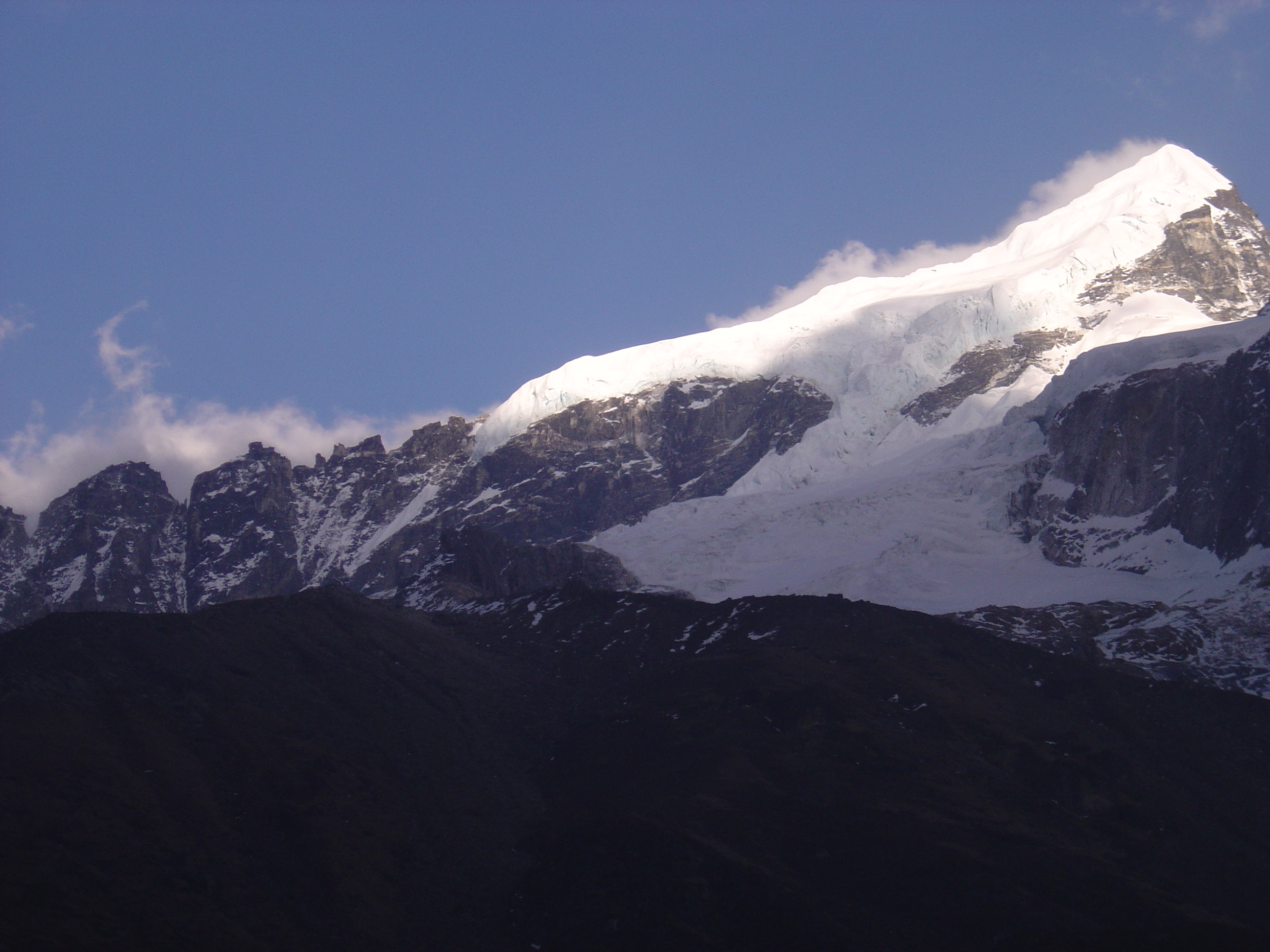
Mount Tingchen Khang

Scenes from the district

Gyalshing district is divided into two sub-divisions:

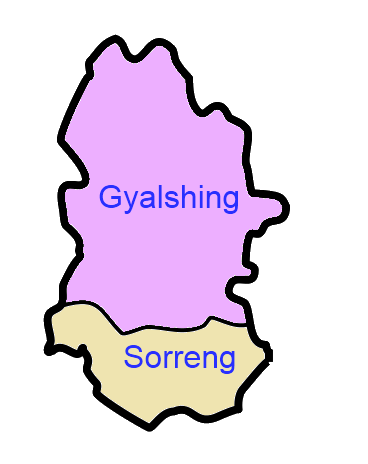
A clickable map of West Sikkim exhibiting its two subdivisions.

| Name | Headquarters | Number of villages | Location |
| Gyalshing | Gyalshing | | |
| Soreng | Soreng | | |
