= List of Monuments of National Importance in Sikkim =

This is a list of Monuments of National Importance (ASI) as officially recognized by and available through the website of the Archaeological Survey of India in the Indian state Sikkim. The monument identifier is a combination of the abbreviation of the subdivision of the list (state, ASI circle) and the numbering as published on the website of the ASI. 3 Monuments of National Importance have been recognized by the ASI in Sikkim.

== List of monuments of national importance ==
SL. No.	Description	Location	Address	District	Coordinates	Image
N-SK-1	Dubdi Monastery	Kheochod Phalvi	Yuksam	Gyalshing district	27°22′00″N 88°13′48″E	Dubdi Monastery More images
N-SK-2	Coronation Throne of Norbugang near Yuksam	Kheochod Phalvi	Yuksam	Gyalshing district	27°22′10″N 88°13′03″E	Coronation Throne of Norbugang near Yuksam More images
N-SK-3	Rabdentse site of ancient capital of Sikkim	Pemayongtse Monastery Estate		Gyalshing district	27°18′07″N 88°15′24″E	Rabdentse site of ancient capital of Sikkim More images

== See also ==
- List of Monuments of National Importance in India for other Monuments of National Importance in India
- List of State Protected Monuments in Sikkim
