= Sanga Choeling Monastery =

Buddhist monastery in Sikkim, India

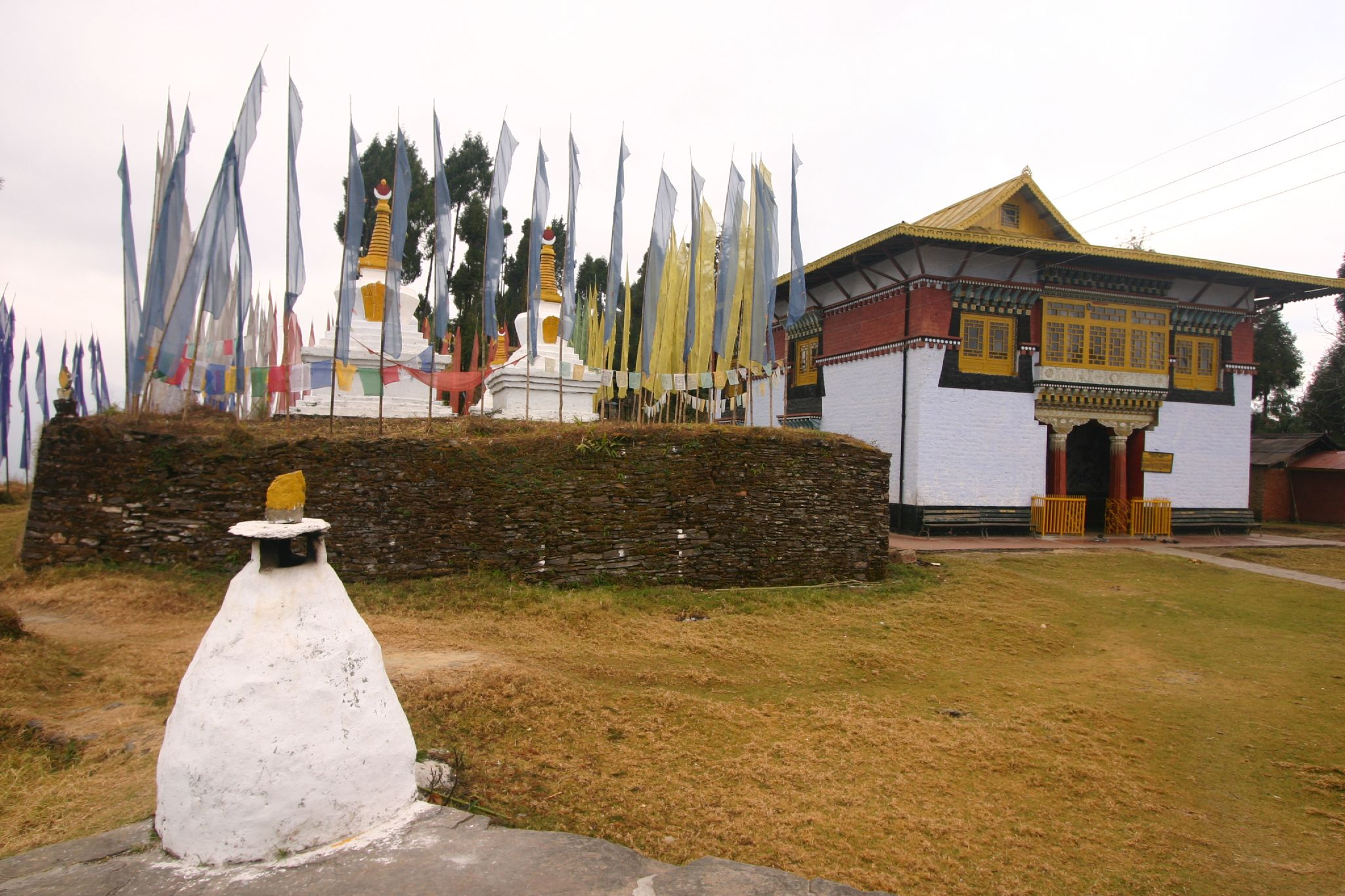
- Full view of Sanga-Choeling Monastery

- Location within Sikkim

Religion
- Affiliation: Tibetan Buddhism
- Sect: Nyingma

Location
- Location: Sanga Choeling, Pelling, Gyalshing district, Sikkim, India
- Country: India
- Interactive map of Sanga Choeling Monastery
- Coordinates: 27°15′50″N 88°13′17″E

Architecture
- Style: Tibetan
- Founder: Lhatsün Namkha Jikmé
- Established: 1701; 325 years ago

The Sanga Choeling Monastery, also spelt Sange Choeling Monastery (Sikkimese: གསང་སྔགས་ཆོས་གླིང, Wylie: gsang sngags chos gling, THL Sangngak Chö Ling), established in the 17th century by Lama Lhatsün Chempo, is one of the oldest monasteries in Pelling, about 10 km from Gyalshing city in the Gyalshing district in Northeast Indian state of Sikkim. The literal meaning of Sanga Choeling is "Island of the Guhyamantra teachings", where gling means a vihara and "secret Mantra teachings" is a synonym for "Vajrayana Buddhism".

The monastery is located on a ridge top above Pelling at a distance of 7 kilometres (4.3 mi) from Pemayangtse Monastery and is accessed by walking the steep hilly track of 4 kilometres (2.5 mi), which traverses through rich forest cover.

Pilgrimage to Sanga Choeling Monastery is undertaken by many Buddhist devotees as part of a religious and heritage circuit encompassing Pemayangtse Monastery, Rabdentse ruins, Khecheopalri Lake, Norbugang Chorten, Dubdi Monastery, Yuksom and Tashiding Monastery.

== Architecture ==
Sanga Choeling Monastery, built in 1697, is also known as the place of secret spells. It has clay statues dating back to the 17th century. The monastery was affected by fire several times and was rebuilt. The Monastery's location provides very scenic and panoramic view all round.

== Religiosity ==
On the tenth day of every month according to the Tibetan calendar, lamas recite hymns at this monastery. Every morning and evening prayers are special here. The monastery is reserved for men only and belongs to the Nyingma sect.

== Gallery ==
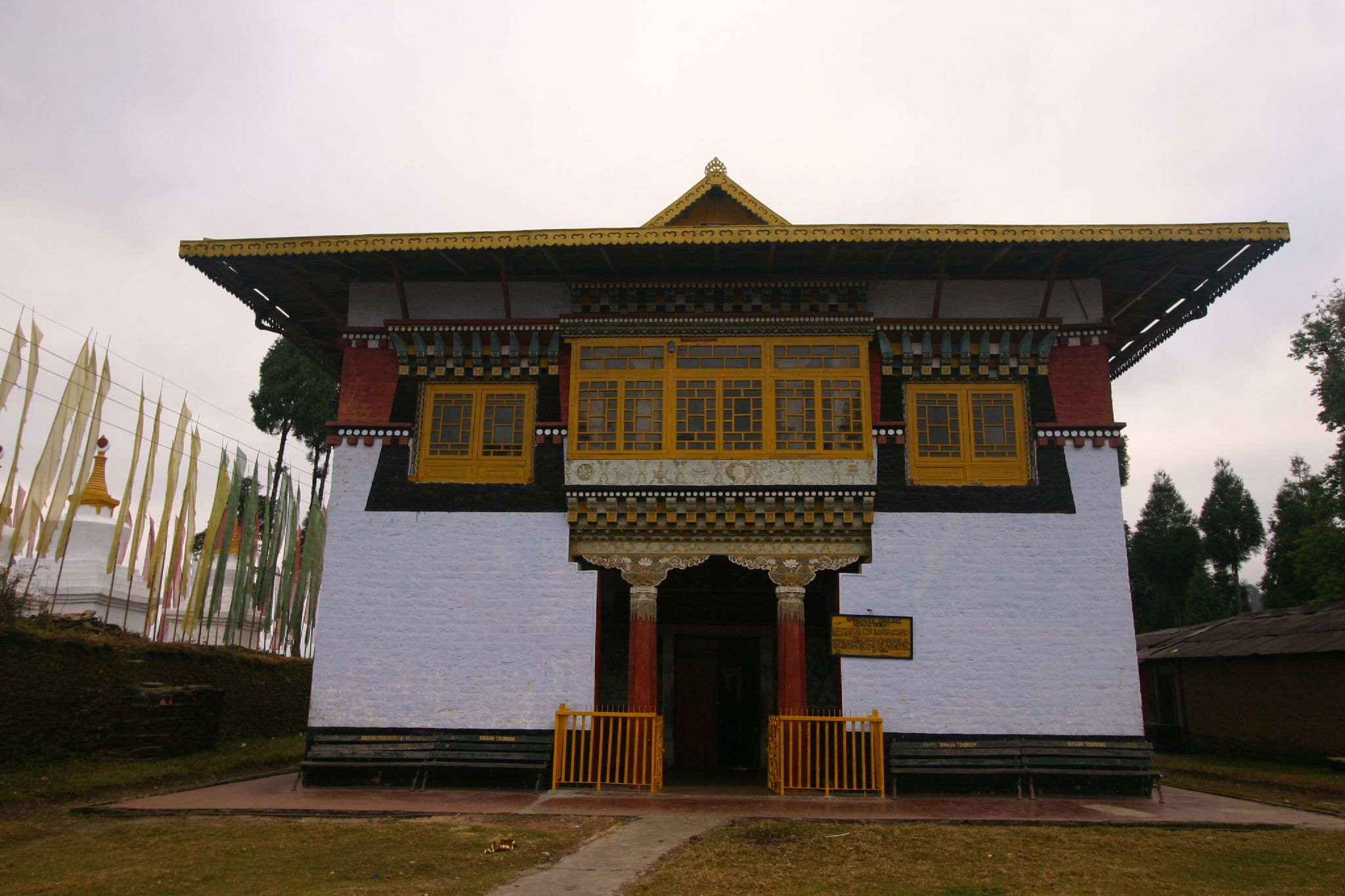
Entrance to Sanga-Choeling Monastery

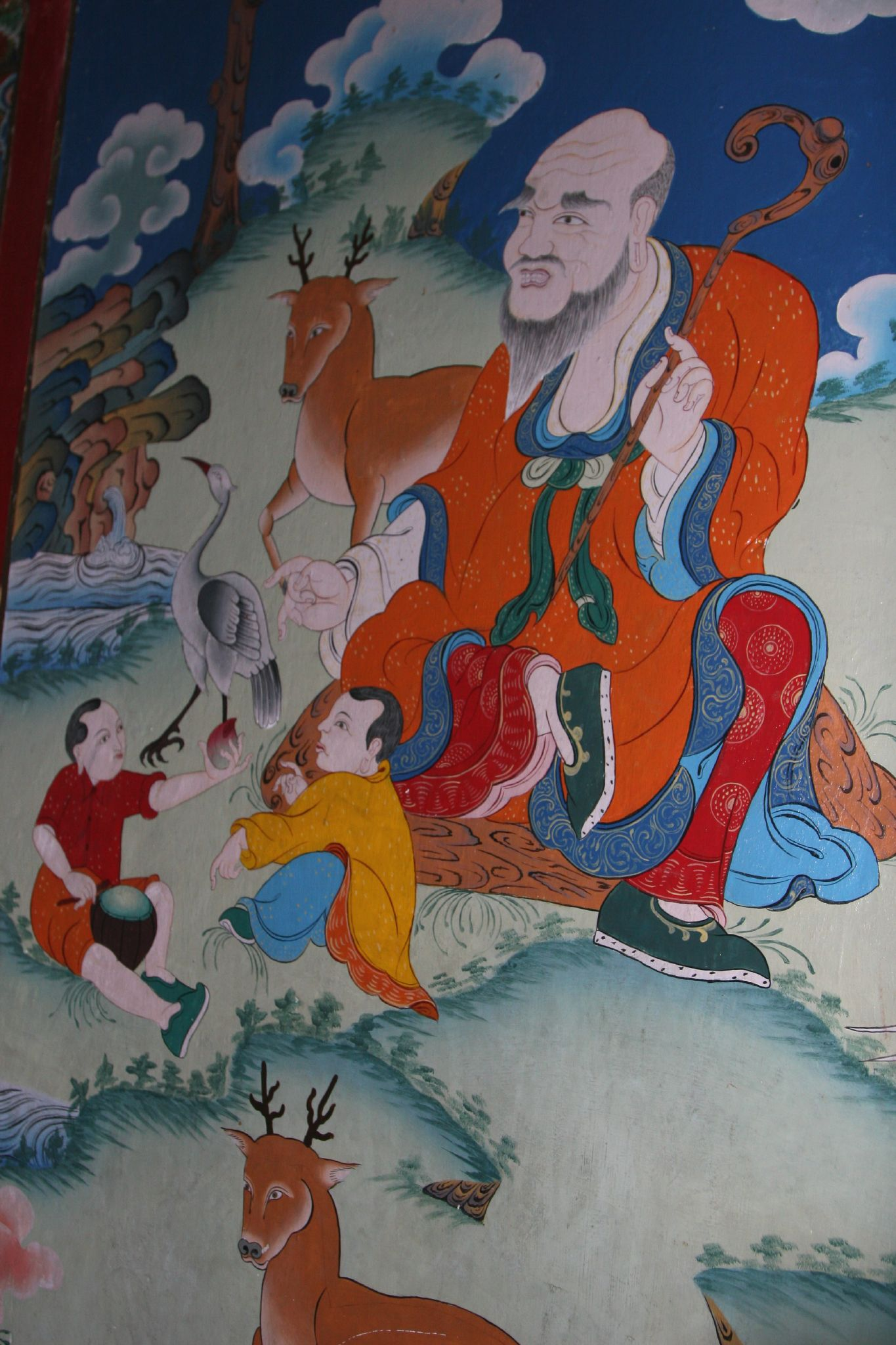
Painting of a saint in Sanga Choeling Monastery

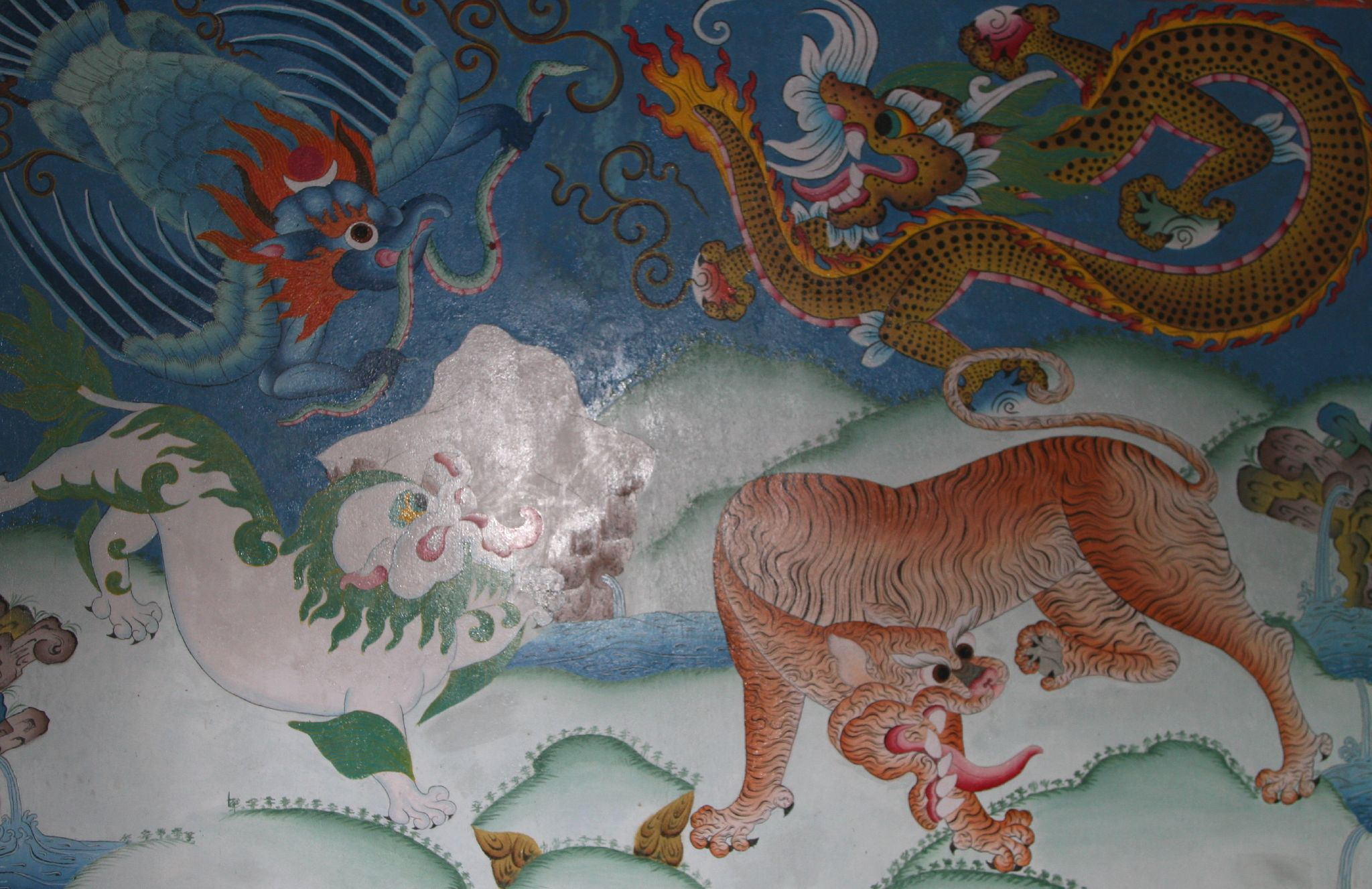
A mythical painting in Sanga Choeling Monastery

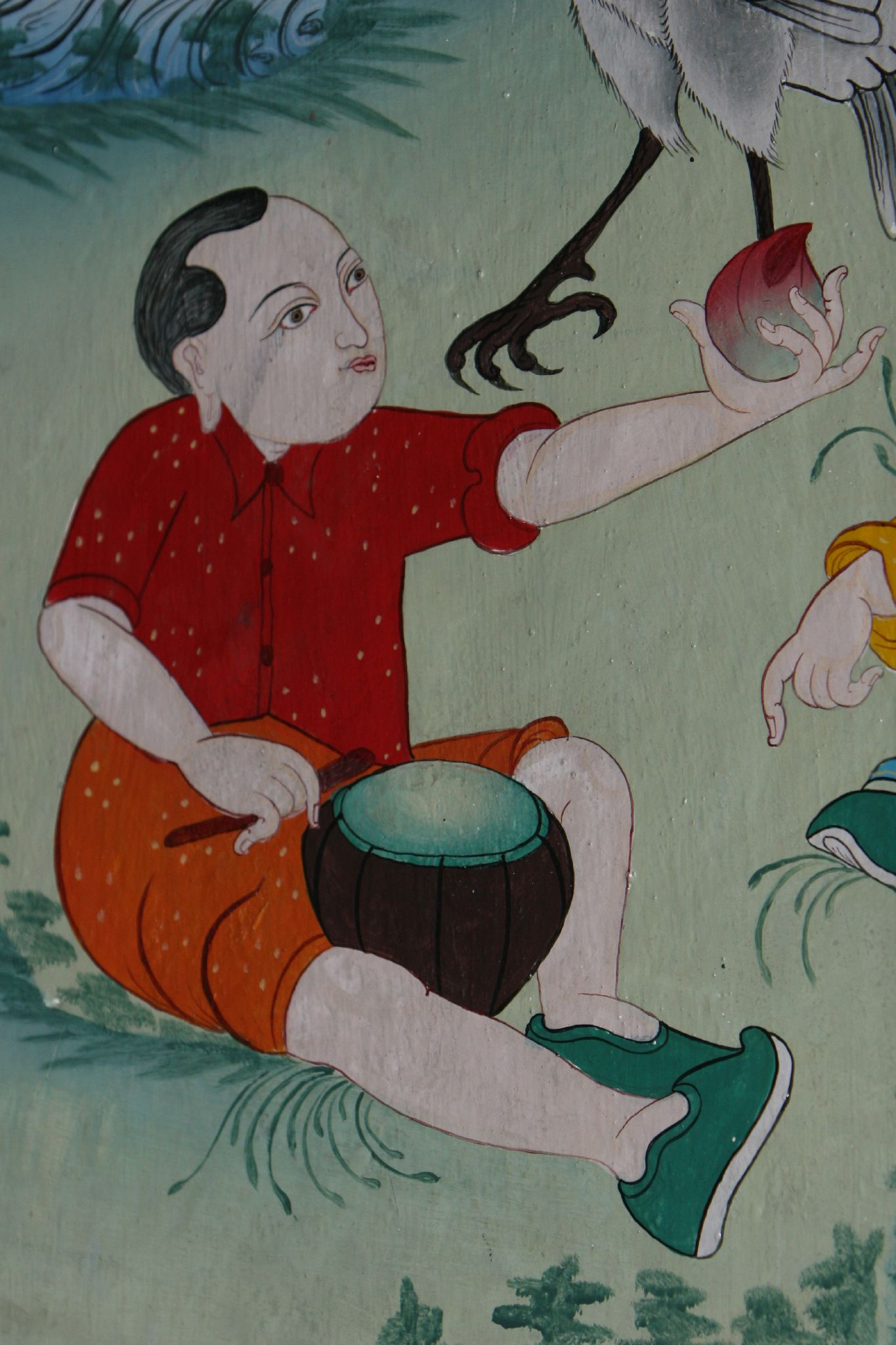
Painting of a drummer in Sanga Choeling Monastery

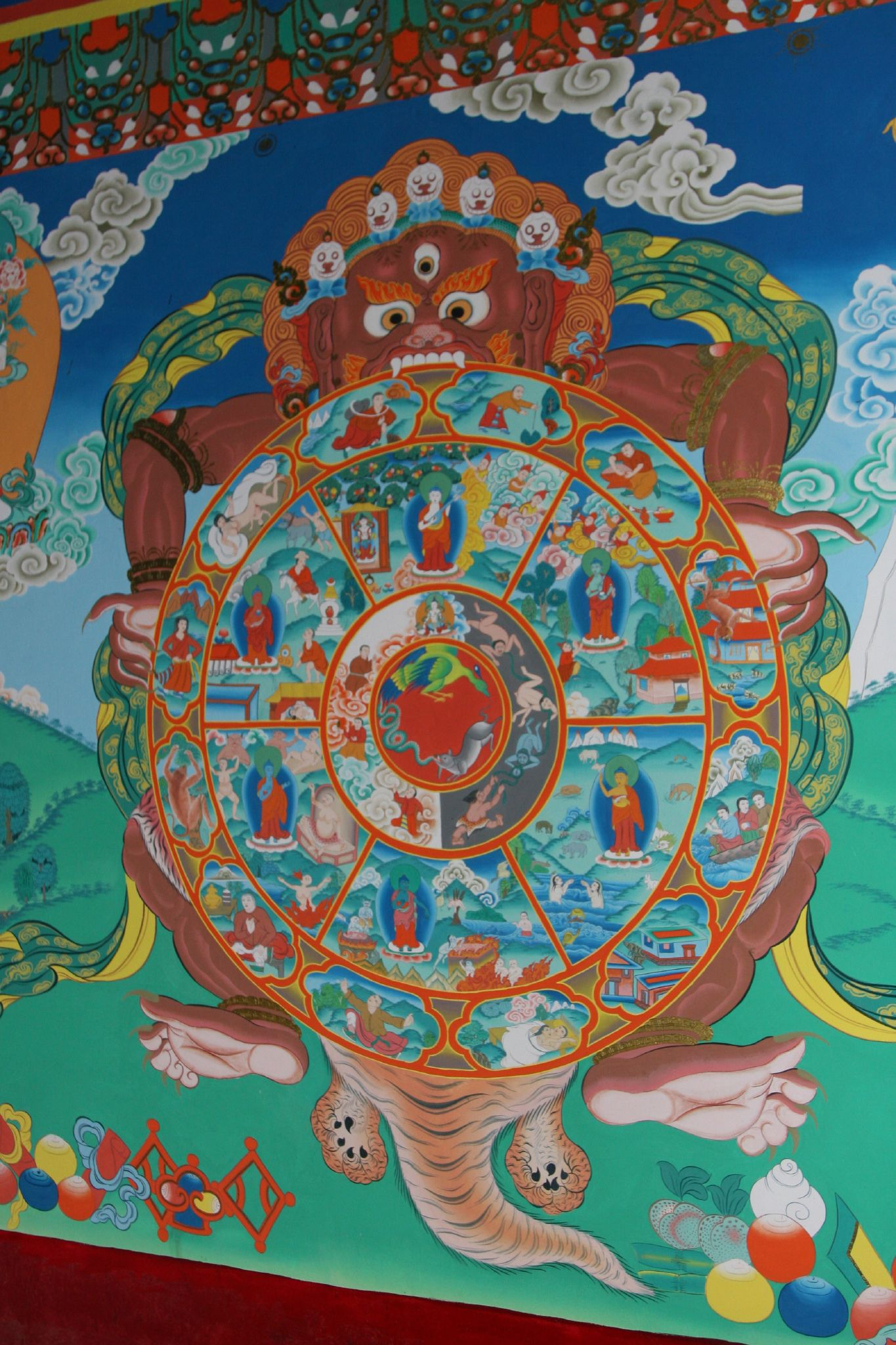
A Wheel of Life painting in Sanga Choeling Monastery
