= Norbugang Chorten =

Stupa in West Sikkim, India

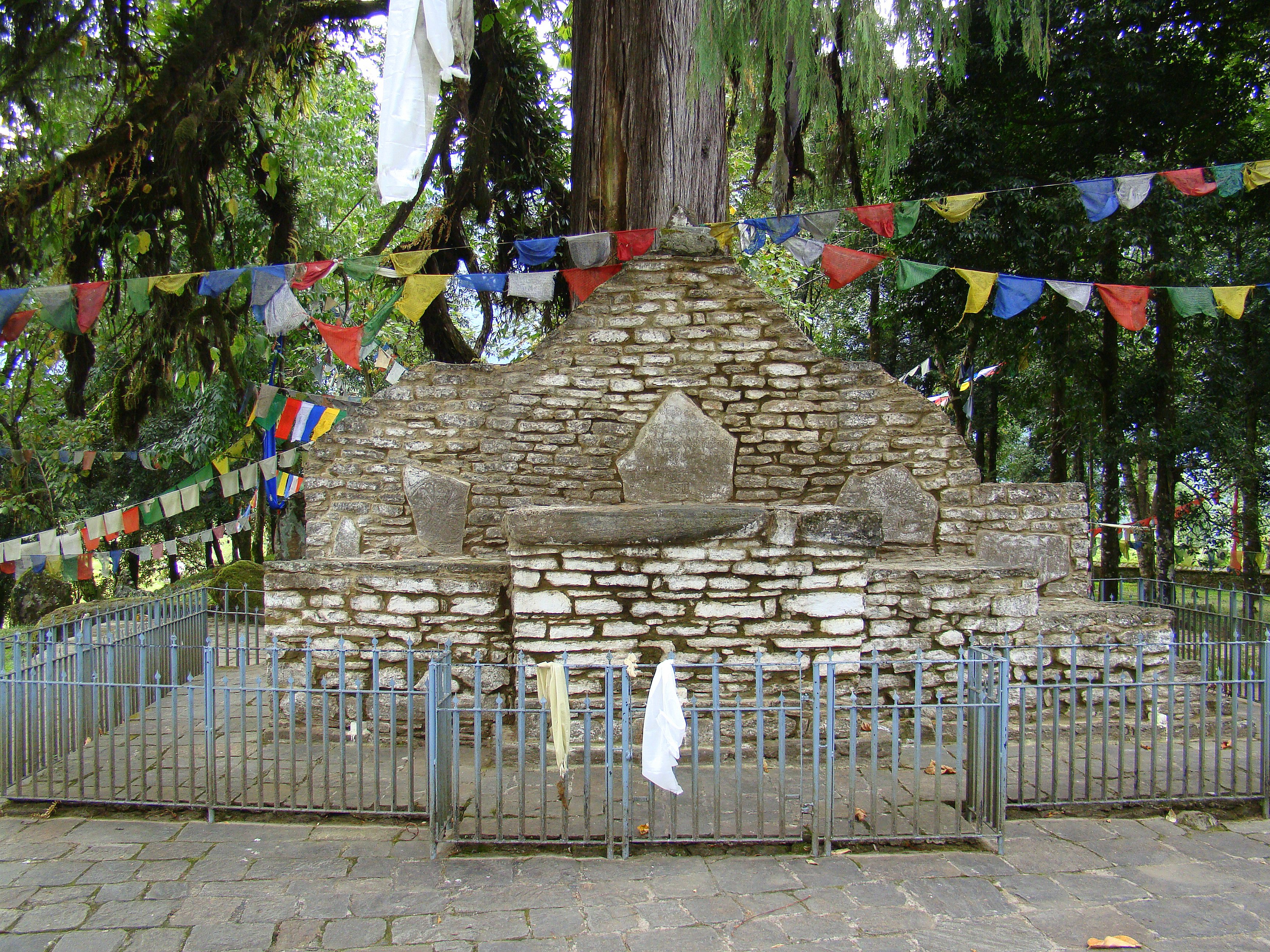
- Coronation Throne at Norbugang Park in Yuksom, Gyalshing district, Sikkim

- Location within Sikkim

Religion
- Affiliation: Tibetan Buddhism
- Sect: Nyingma

Location
- Location: Yuksom, Gyalshing district, Sikkim, India
- Country: India
- Interactive map of Norbugang Chorten
- Coordinates: 27°22′24″N 88°13′15″E

Architecture
- Style: Tibetan
- Founder: Lhatsun Namkha Jigme
- Established: 1642; 384 years ago
- Narbugong throne, Yuksom, Kuthok Lake and Dubdi Monastery are within its precincts

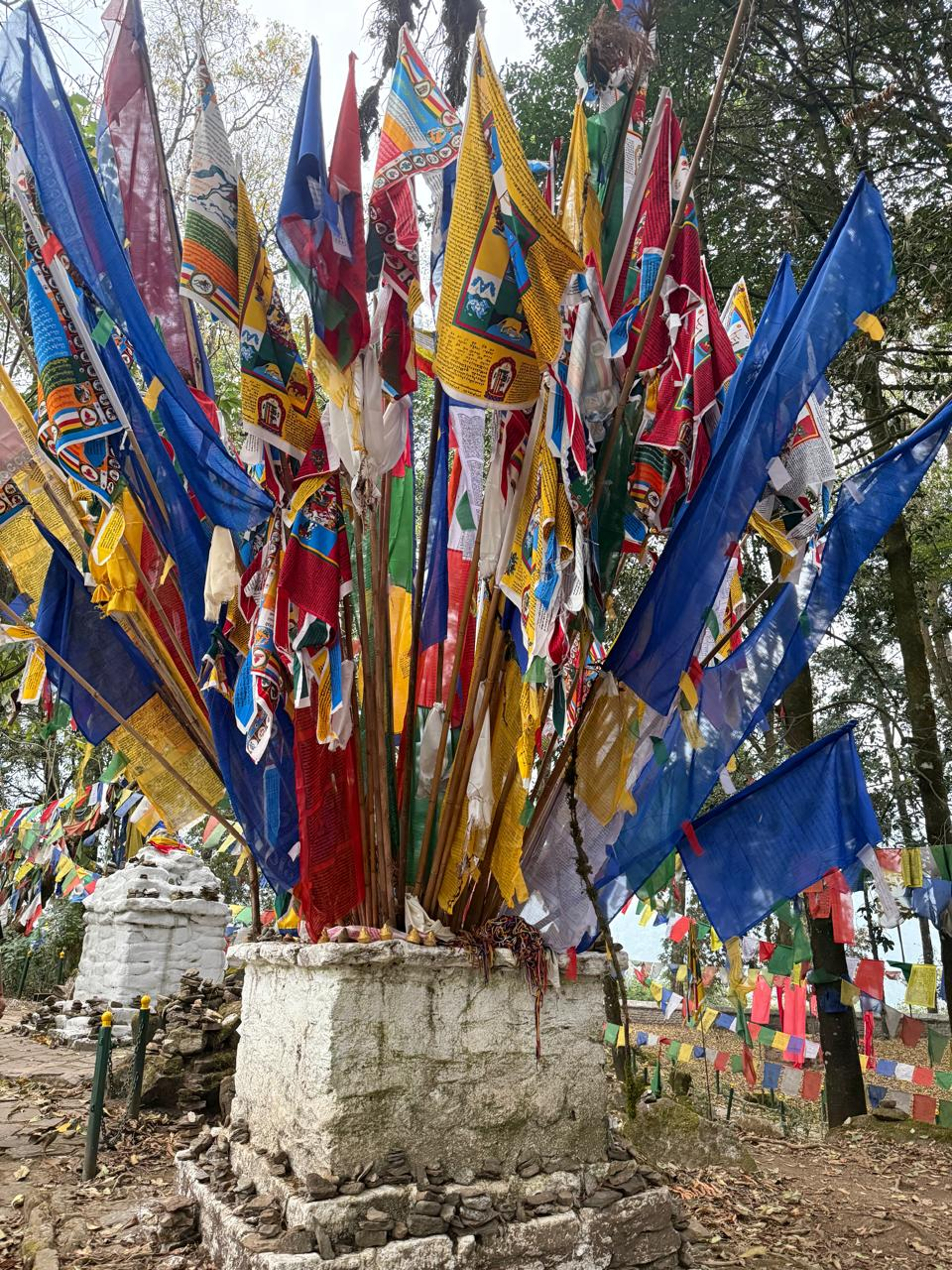
Prayer flags at Norbugang chorten

The Norbugang Chorten (Sikkimese: ནོར་པུ་སྒང་མཆོད་རྟེན་, Wylie: nor bu sgang mchod rten) is a stupa situated in Yuksom, near the Gyalshing city of the Gyalshing district in the Indian State of Sikkim. It was erected following the crowning of the first Chogyal of Sikkim in 1642 at Narbugong Coronation Throne near Yuksom (Gyalshing). A holy lake known as Kuthok Lake, a serene lake, is also linked to the historicity of the place. The Chorten was the place where Lama Lhutsun Chempo created the time capsule by burying all the gifts to mark the occasion.

The Norbugang Chorten and the Norbugang throne are visited as part of Buddhist religious pilgrimage circuit involving the Dubdi Monastery, Pemayangtse Monastery, the Rabdentse ruins, the Sanga Choeling Monastery, the Khecheopalri Lake, and the Tashiding Monastery.

== History ==
Norbugang Chorten was established during a consecration ceremony that was held by three learned Lamas headed by Lhatsun Chempo, crowning the first Chogyal of Sikkim. Lhatsun Chempo had suffixed his own surname of 'Namgye' to Phunshog who was crowned the Chogyal and subsequently the king came to be known as Phunshog Namgyal. On this occasion, the Lepchas and Magarsof the area, who had accompanied Phunshog to Yuksom Norbugang for the coronation ceremony, had presented a large number of treasures to the lamas, particularly to Lhatsun Chempo. After the crowning ceremony was performed by the lamas according to procedures prescribed in the scriptures, the lamas decided to build the Trashi-wod-hBar-Chorten at Norbugang. For this purpose, they collected earth and stones from all parts of Sikkim. They then built the chorten with the materials collected and also buried within it all the gifts that Lhatsun Chempo had received from the people. The benediction and consecration ceremonies performed by the lamas at the Norbugang Chorten lasted for 21 days.

== Setting ==
A park called the Norbugang Park has been created at Yuksom, 42 km (26 mi) from Pelling town, which encloses a prayer hall, large prayer wheel, the Norbugang Chorten (stupa), and the purported Coronation Throne (Norbugang) set below a large cryptomeria pine. The wooden head board at the location of the throne, made of stone, appears like an altar. The Norbugang Coronation throne, which has the "appearance of an old Olympic Medal Podium" is made of stones, which has been white washed now. The stone throne has four seats, with the top one intended for Lama Lhatsun Chhempo. The coronation took place under the pine tree, which is still present today. Just opposite to the throne is the Norbung Chorten (stupa), which is said to contain water and soil from all parts of Sikkim. . The small Kathok Lake's waters were used for the consecration ceremony held to crown the Chogyal. A foot print seen here is attributed to be of one of the lamas involved in the crowning ceremony. By removing the head board, imprints are clearly seen of toes and soles of feet.

== See also ==
- Yuksom
- Khecheopalri Lake
- Dubdi Monastery

== Gallery ==
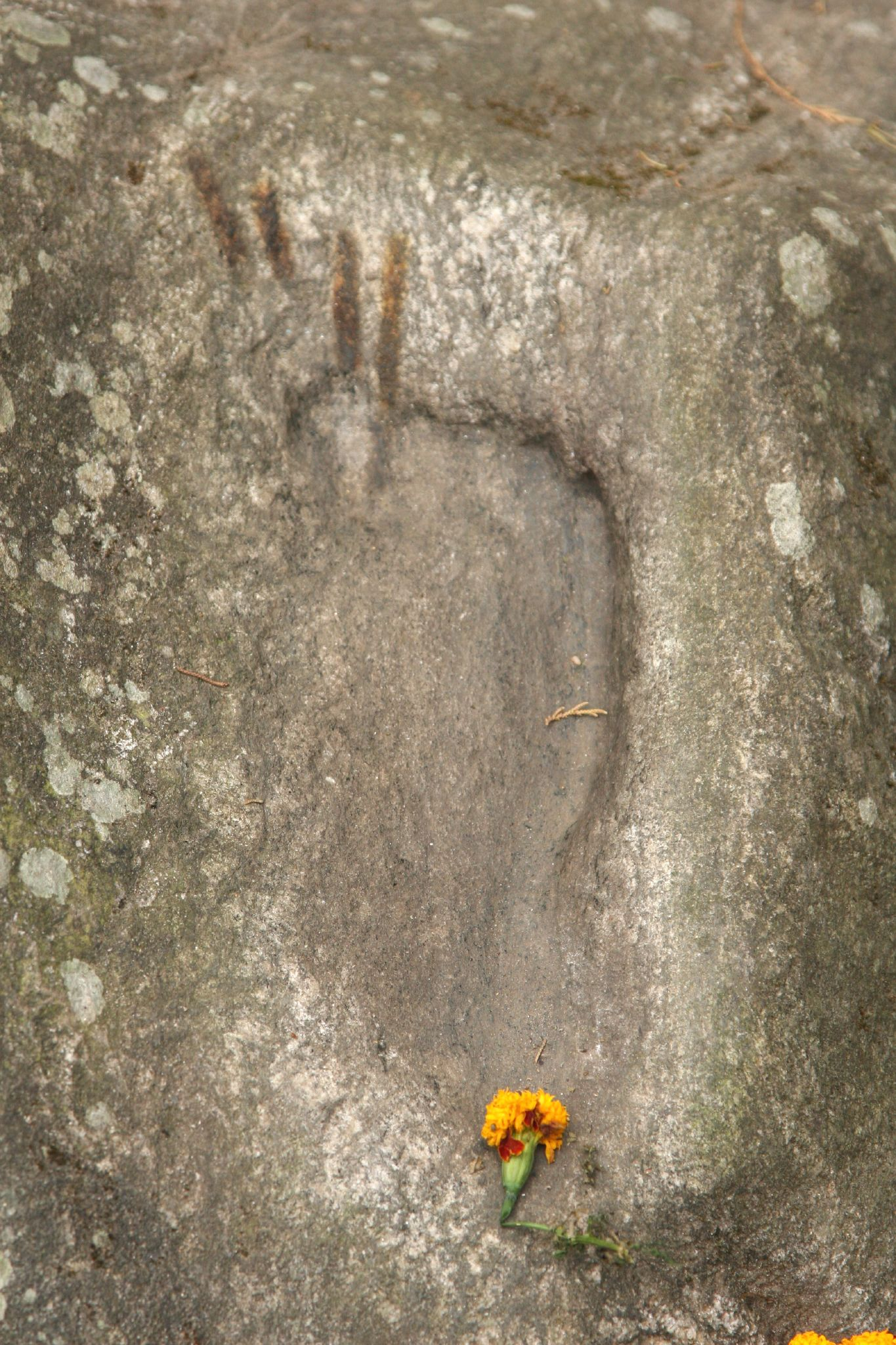
Footprint of Lhatsun Namkha Jigme

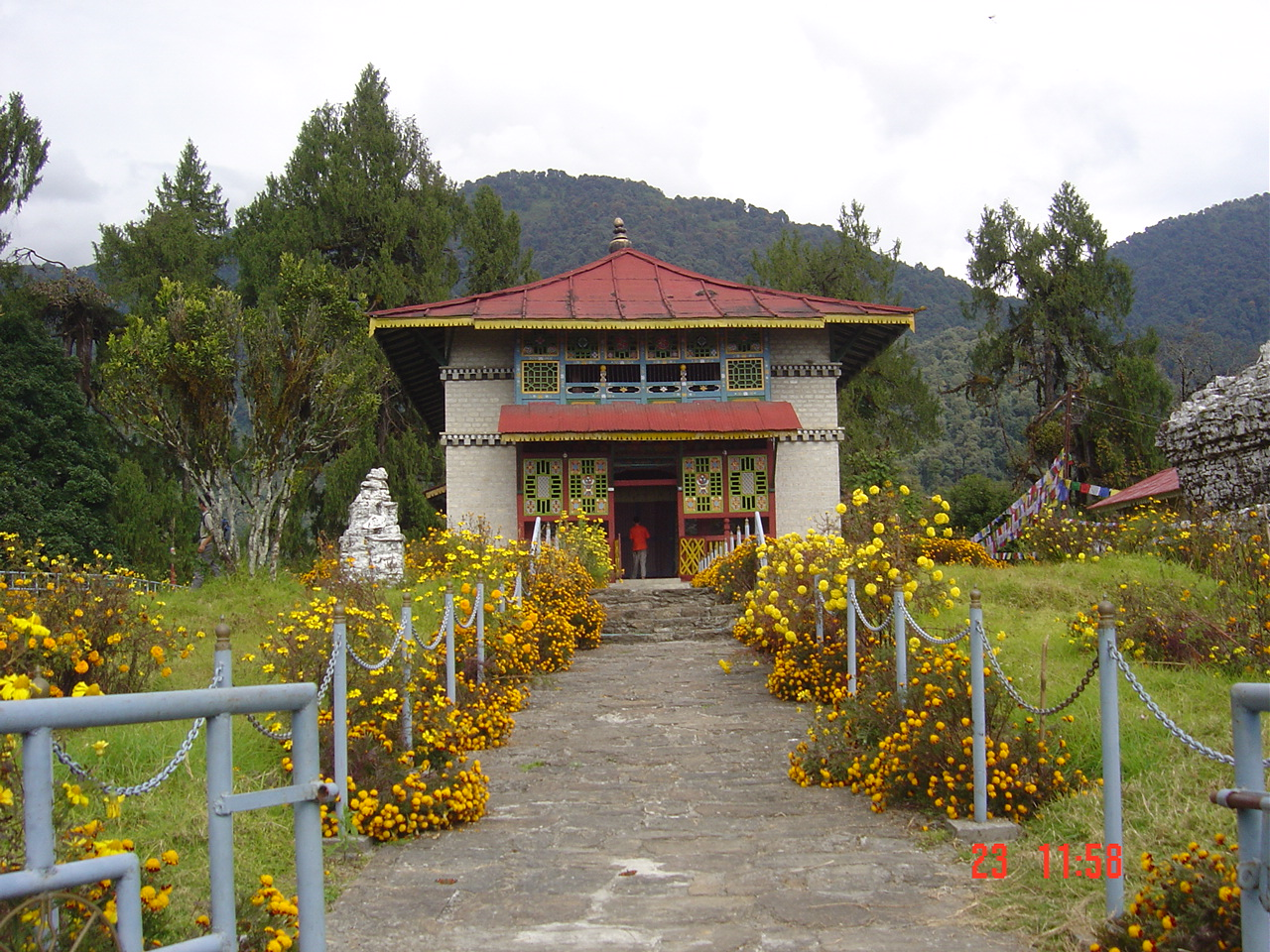
Norbugang Chorten to the right of the Yuksom Dubdi Gompa

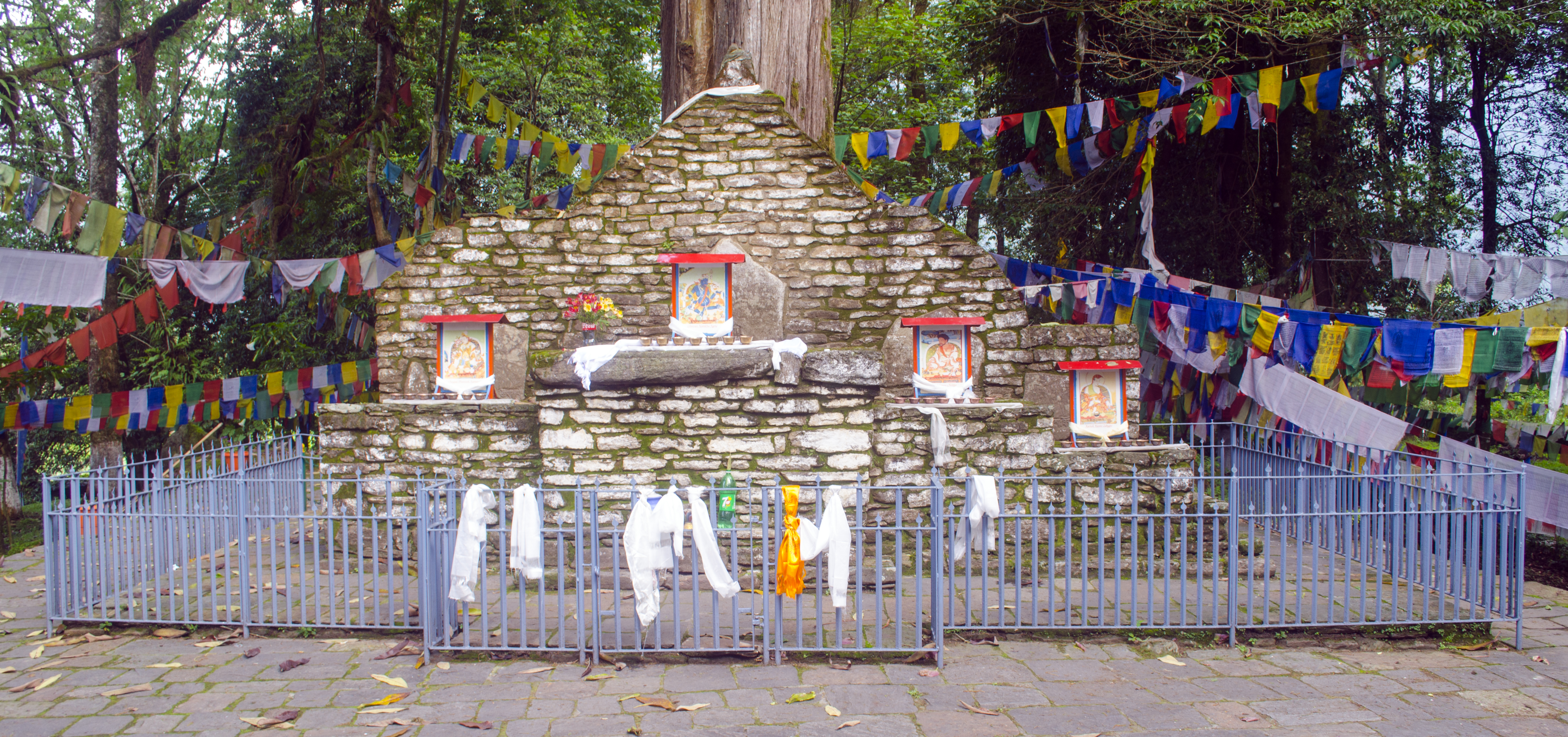
