= Yuksom =

Town in West Sikkim, India

Yuksom Yuksum
- Town
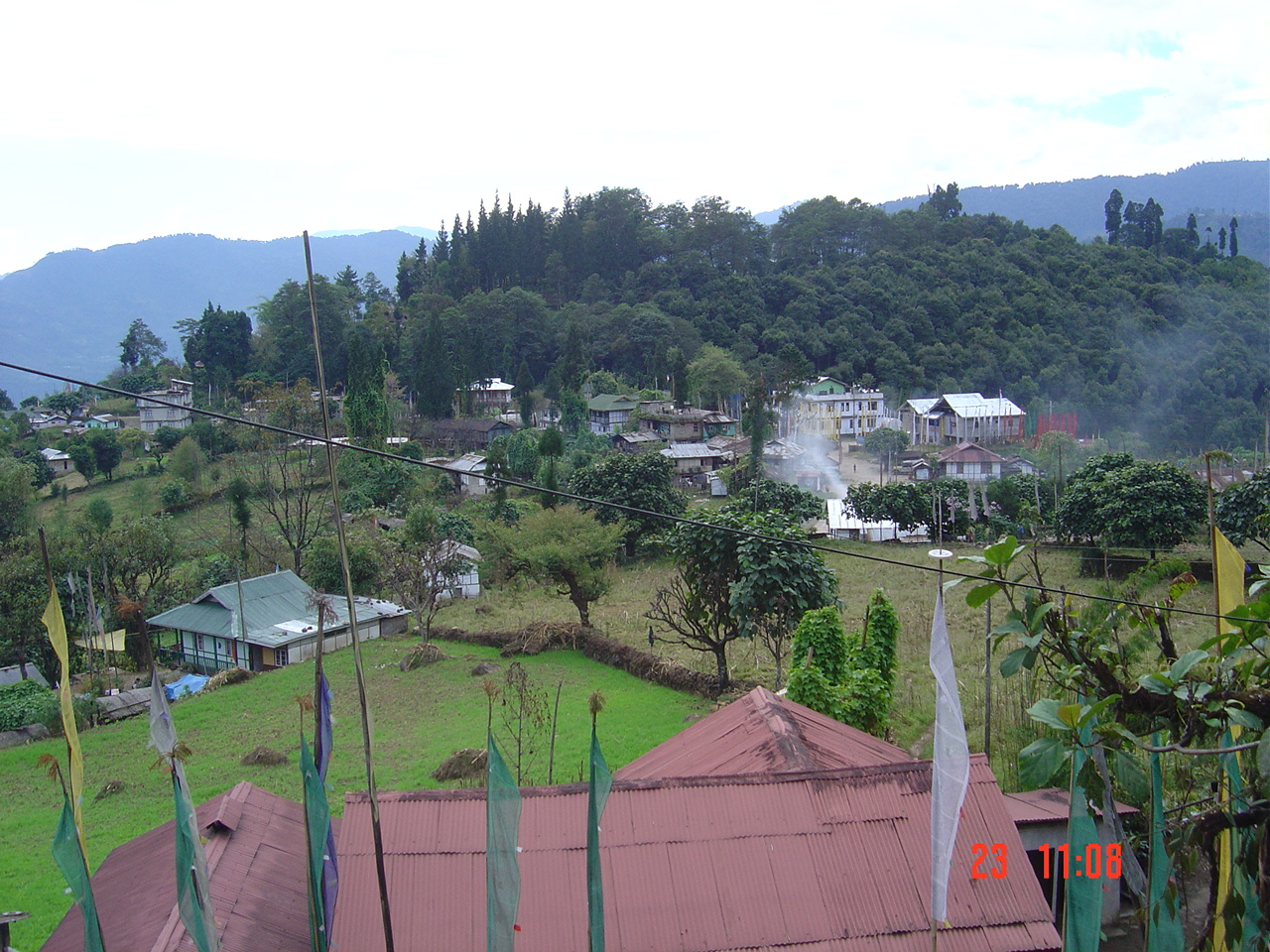
- Yuksom town

- Location in Sikkim, India Yuksom (India)
- Coordinates: 27°22′24″N 88°13′15″E
- Country: India
- State: Sikkim
- District: Gyalshing
- Elevation: 1,780 m (5,840 ft)

Population (2011)
  - Total: 1,951

Languages
  - Official: English; Nepali; Sikkimese; Lepcha
  - Additional official: Gurung; Limbu; Magar; Mukhia; Newari; Rai; Sherpa; Tamang
- Time zone: UTC+5:30 (IST)
- Vehicle registration: SK

Yuksom (Nepali pronunciation: [jaksom]), also spelt Yuksum, is a historical town about 40 km north of Gyalshing in the Gyalshing district, in the northeast Indian state of Sikkim. It was the first capital of the Kingdom of Sikkim, established in 1642 by Phuntsog Namgyal, the first Chogyal of Sikkim.

Yuksom is home to the Norbugang Chorten, the stupa where Namgyal was crowned. The dynastic rule of the Chogyals lasted from 1642 until 1975.

The Chogyal established Sikkim's first monastery at Yuksom, known as the Dubdi Monastery, in 1701. It is part of a Buddhist pilgrimage circuit that includes the Norbugang Chorten, Pemayangtse Monastery, the Rabdentse ruins, the Sanga Choeling Monastery, Khecheopalri Lake, and Tashiding Monastery.

For the Bhutia community of Sikkim, Yuksom has religious and cultural significance. It has several Buddhist monasteries and historical monuments and ancient Gurkha villages. As a gateway to Khangchendzonga National Park and a base for trekking to Mount Khangchendzonga, it attracts mountaineers and trekkers from around the world.

== Etymology ==
Yuksom literally means the "meeting place of the three learned monks". It is believed that three monks came from Tibet and selected Phuntsog Namgyal as the first King of Sikkim, giving him the title Chogyal. 'Chogyal' means "religious king" or "the king who rules with righteousness".

Yuksom is also one of the sacred landscapes of "Demazong" ("the valley of rice"), one of the four religious sites blessed by Guru Padmasambhava. These sites are considered to represent the four plexuses of the human body, with Yuksom symbolically representing the "third eye".

== History ==
Sikkim was introduced to Buddhism from Tibet as early as the 9th century. In Tibet, the struggle for power between the "Yellow hats" and the "Red hats" led the latter to migrate to Sikkim and convert the local Lepchas to Buddhism. In the 13th century, relations between Sikkim and Tibet were strengthened by a "Brotherhood treaty" signed between the Lepcha chief Thekong Thek and the Tibetan prince Khe-Bhumsa at Kavi, in north Sikkim.

In 1641, Lama Lutsum Chembo (Lhatsun Chenpo) traveled from Tibet to Drejong, meaning the "hidden country", now known as Sikkim, to propagate Buddhism. He was later joined by two other lamas, Sempa Chembo and Rinzing Chembo. The three Lamas came from the Kham (Thangut Kingdom), in Tibet. Their primary aim was to strengthen Tibetan influence on Sikkim and to propagate Buddhism there. They assembled from different directions at Norbugang, which later came to be known as Yuksom. The area in the Rathong Chu Valley at Narbugong was considered to be blessed by the 9th-century Guru Padmasambhava.

In 1642, the lamas set out to find the fourth person, as they represented the three directions of north, south, and west, while Padmasambhava's vision had predicted the need for a fourth person from the east.

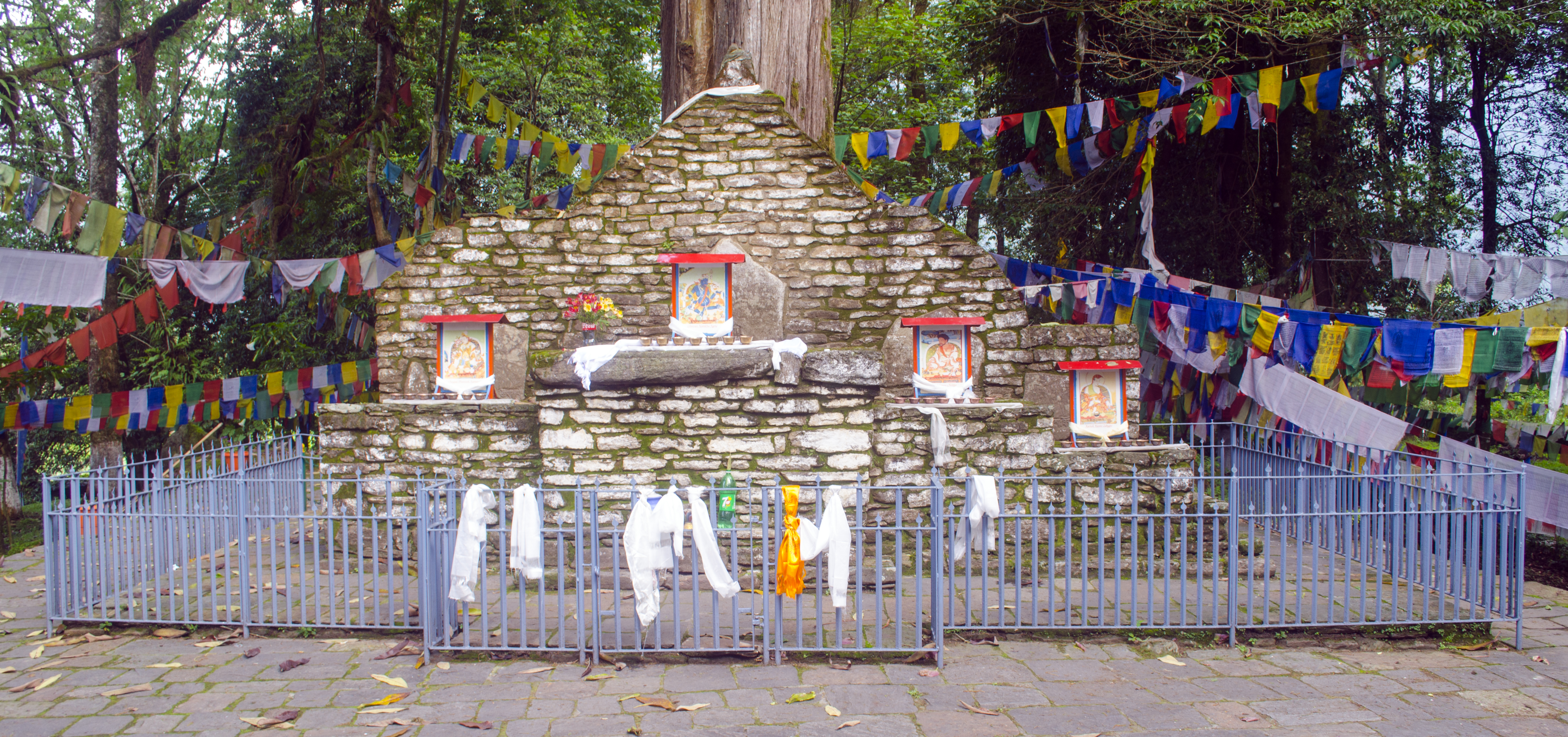
Throne of Norbugang

They found a man churning milk near present-day Gangtok. He offered them refreshments and gave them shelter. Impressed by his deeds, they concluded that he was the chosen one. They also identified Phunstsog Namgyal's ancestral royal links with Tibet and decided that he was the right person to become the temporal and religious head of the region, bringing him to Yuksom. They crowned him at Norbugang, near Yuksom, as the temporal and religious king of Sikkim, with the title Chogyal. The coronation took place at Norbugang on a pedestal set in stones on a pine-covered hill, and he was anointed with water from a sacred urn. At the time, he was 38 years of age. He was a fifth-generation descendant of Guru Tashi, a 13th-century prince from the Mi-nyak House in Kham in Eastern Tibet. The stone throne on which the coronation took place still stands and is known as the Throne of Norbugang.

Thereafter, the dynastic rule of Chogyals, the propagation of Buddhism, and the building of monasteries and chortens took firm roots in Sikkim. The Namgyal monarchy, consisting of 12 kings, lasted from 1642 until 1975. Tibetan Mahayana Buddhism, known as Vajrayana, was introduced and was ultimately recognized as the state religion of Sikkim.

== Geography and environment ==
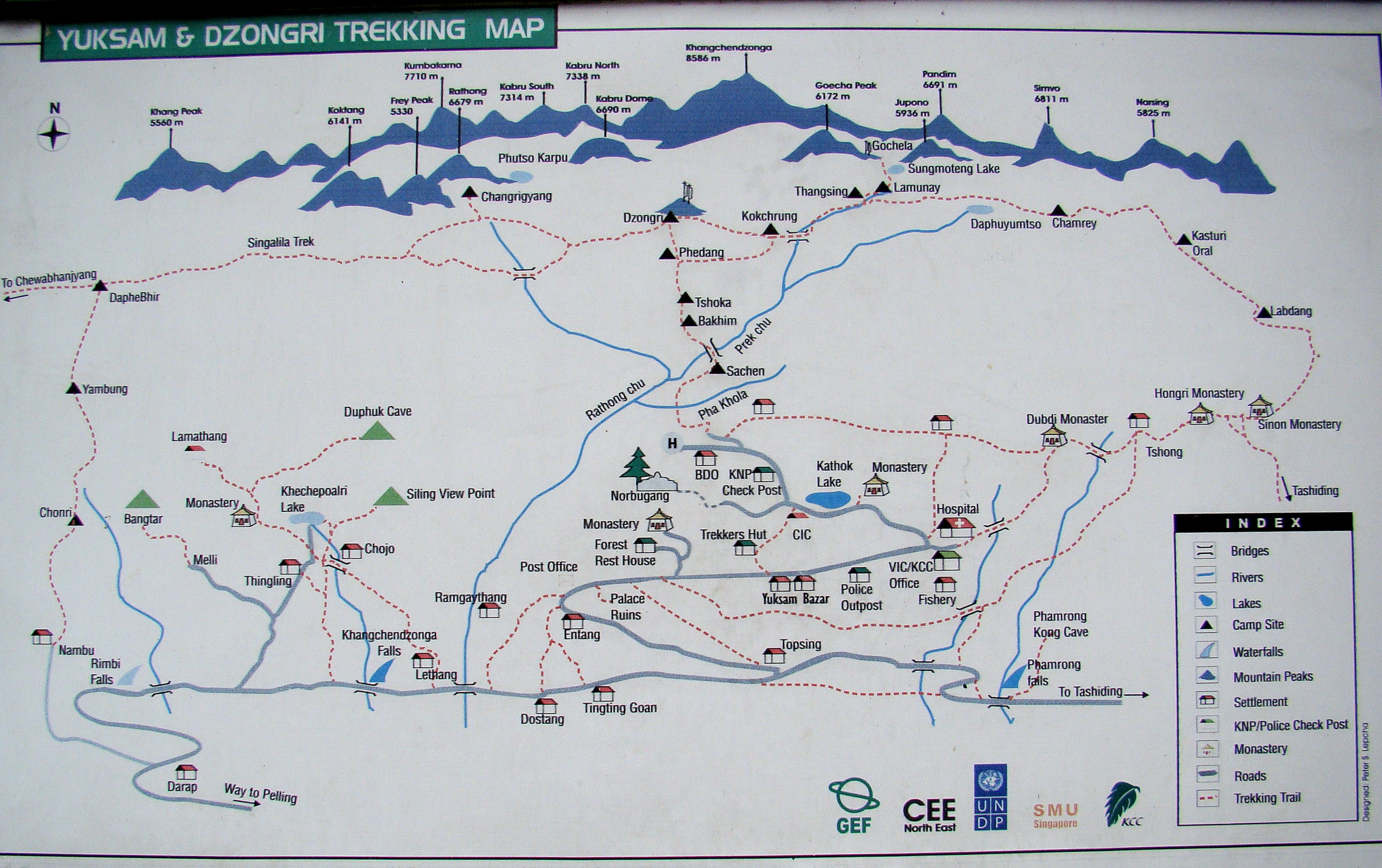
Location map of Yuksom and other religious sites nearby on the Yuksom–Goecha trek route

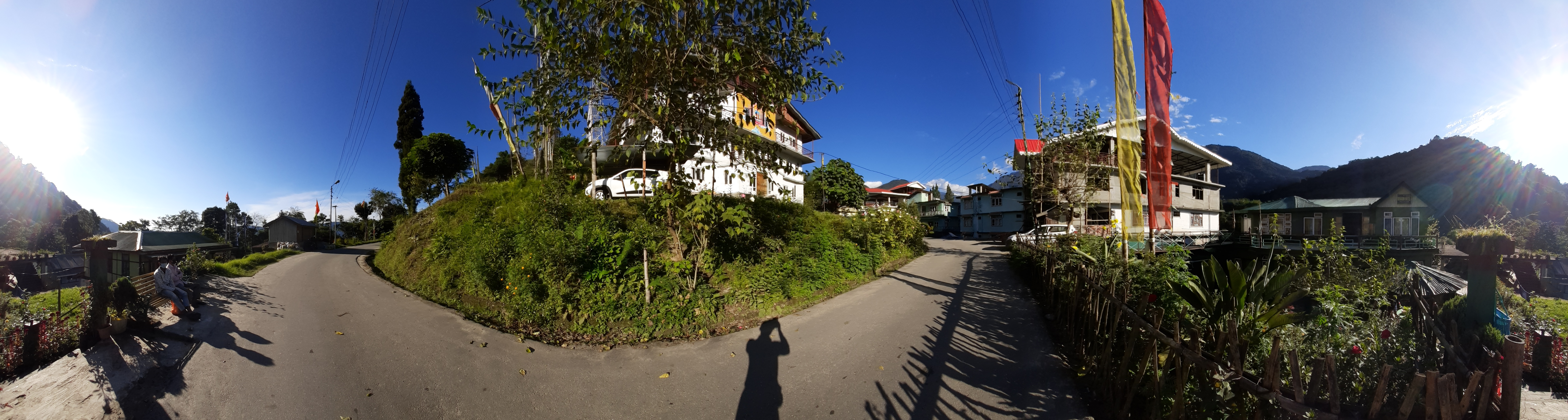
Panoramic view of a village in Yuksom

Yuksom is a large village with a total area of 812.16 hectares (2,006.9 acres), situated at an average altitude of 1,780 metres (5,840 ft). It lies in a basin-like valley surrounded by mountain ranges. Located at the head of the Khangchendzonga National Park, it is the gateway to Mount Kangchenjunga. A popular mountaineering trek starts from Yuksom, which is well connected by a road network with Geyzing and Gangtok.

The climate in Yuksom, which is located at a moderate altitude, is pleasant from March to June and from September to November. The coldest months are December and February.

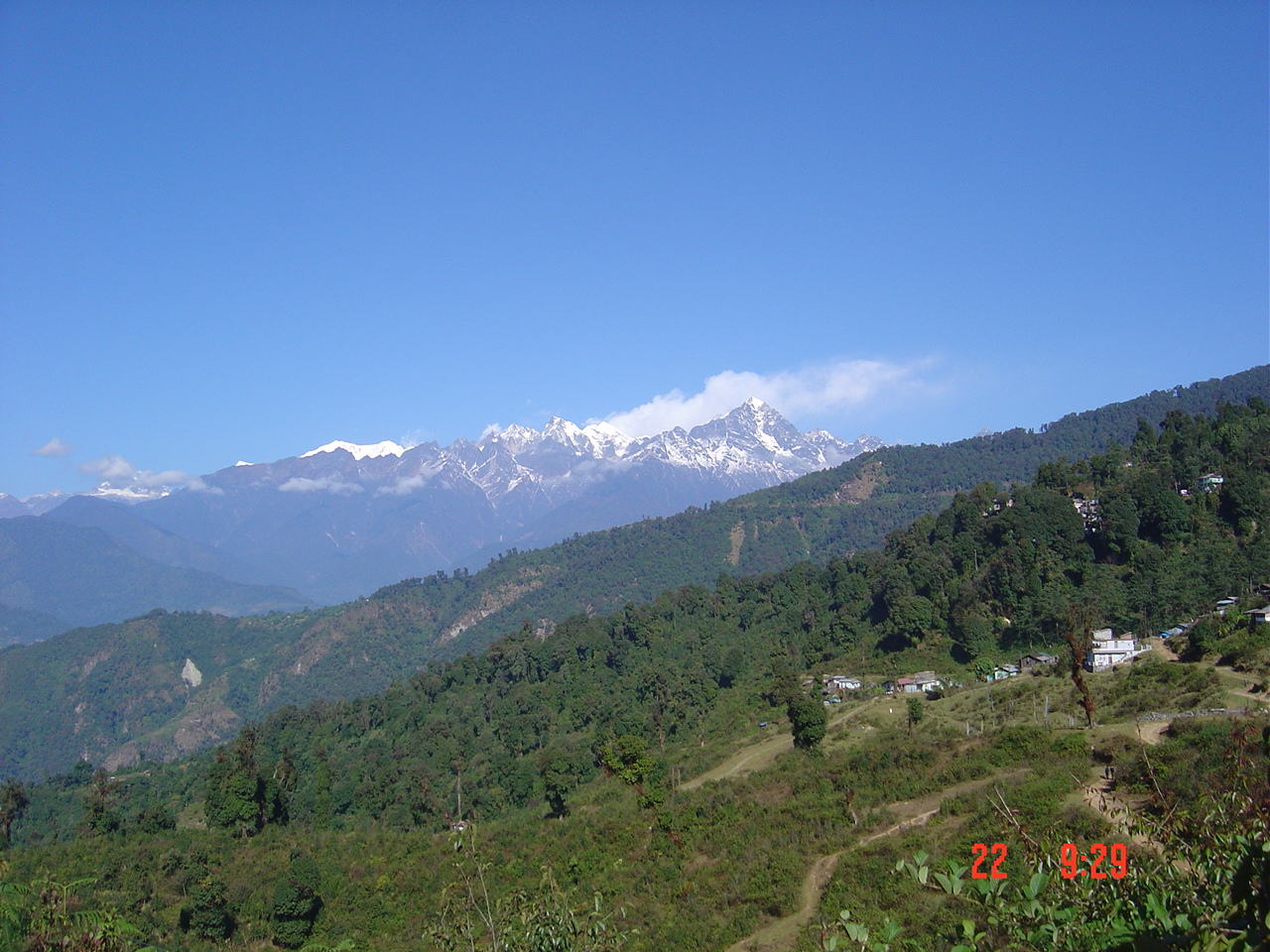
Countryside en route to Yuksom from Gangtok

The natural setting of the town, surrounded by forests, is further accentuated by its history, architecture, and Buddhist legacy, which developed from the 17th century when Yuksom was established as the first capital of Sikkim. Situated at the head of Khangchenjunga National Park, the largest protected area in Sikkim, and at starting point for the trekking trail to Mount Khangchendzonga, Yuksom and its hills were named in the past as Ney-Pemathang for their beautiful landscape. The forest cover in the hills consists of broad-leaved oak, birch, maple, chestnut, magnolia, rhododendron, silver fir, ash, and alder, which contribute to Sikkim's description as a biodiversity hotspot.

== Administration ==
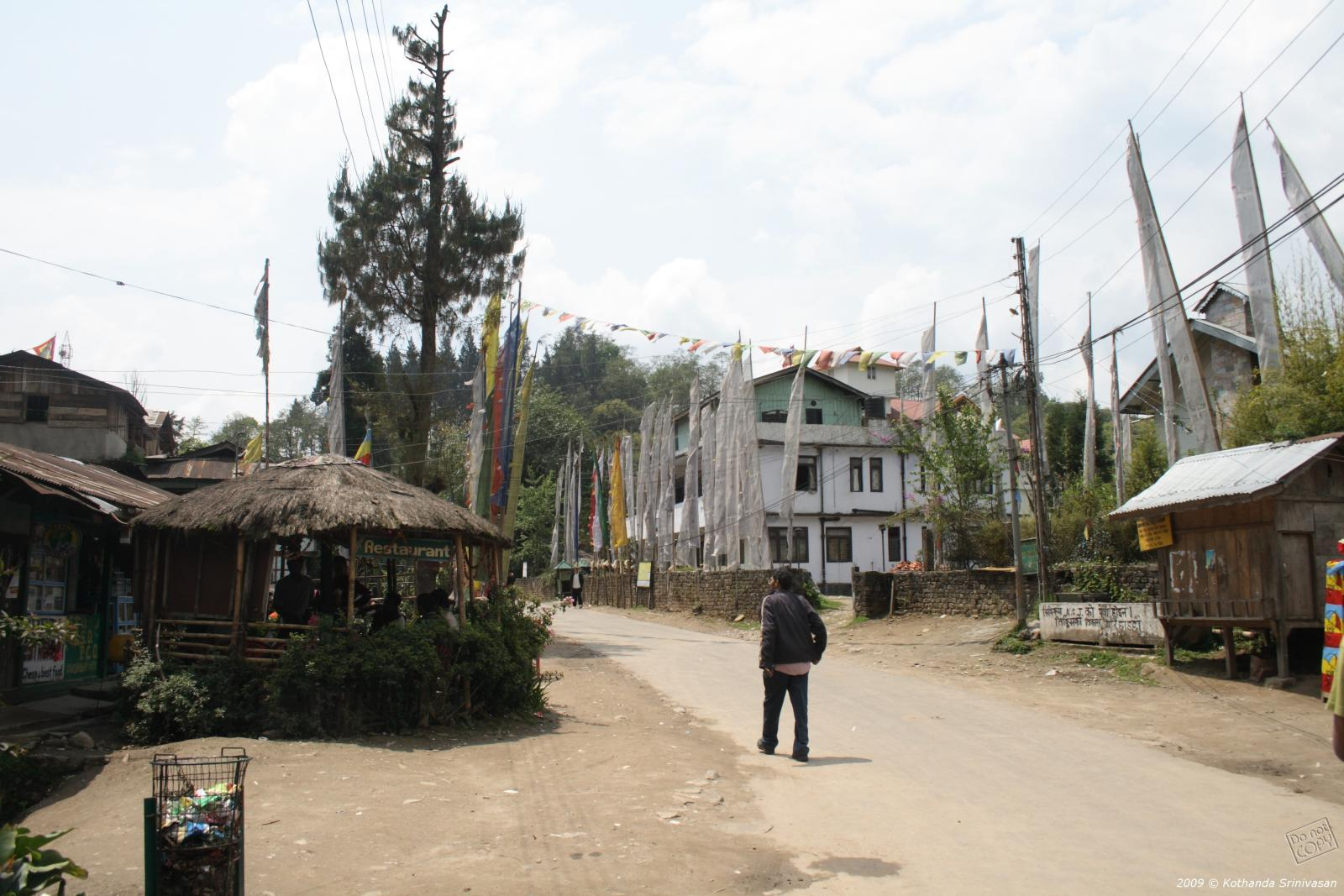
The main street in Yuksom

The first act that Phuntsog initiated after becoming the king was the conversion of the local Lepcha tribes to Buddhism. He also set about expanding his kingdom to include the Chumbi Valley in Tibet, parts of modern-day Darjeeling in the south, and parts of eastern Nepal. In this effort, the three lamas also lent full support to him.

Phuntsog moved his capital to Yuksom and instituted the first centralised administration. The kingdom was divided into twelve dzongs or districts under a Lepcha dzongpon (governor), who headed a council of twelve ministers. During his reign, Buddhism was consolidated as the established religion in Sikkim. He was succeeded by his son, Tensung Namgyal, in 1670. However, Yuksom's importance as capital ended in 1670, when Tensung Namgyal shifted the capital to Rabdentse.

At present, Yuksom is a heritage village in the Geyzing subdivision of West District, Sikkim. It is now a tourist destination. It serves as a starting point for the trek to Goechala via Dzongri and as a base camp of the Himalayan Mountaineering Institute for treks to Mount Khangchendzonga.

== Demographics ==
According to the 2011 census, Yuksom had 364 households and a population of 1,951. The number of visitors often exceeds the permanent population, as the village lies on a trekking route and is also a religious centre for Buddhists. The main communities in the village are the Bhutias and the Nepalese, with the Bhutias forming the dominant ethnic group. The service and the trading sectors, however, are dominated by people from the plains.

== Economy and facilities ==
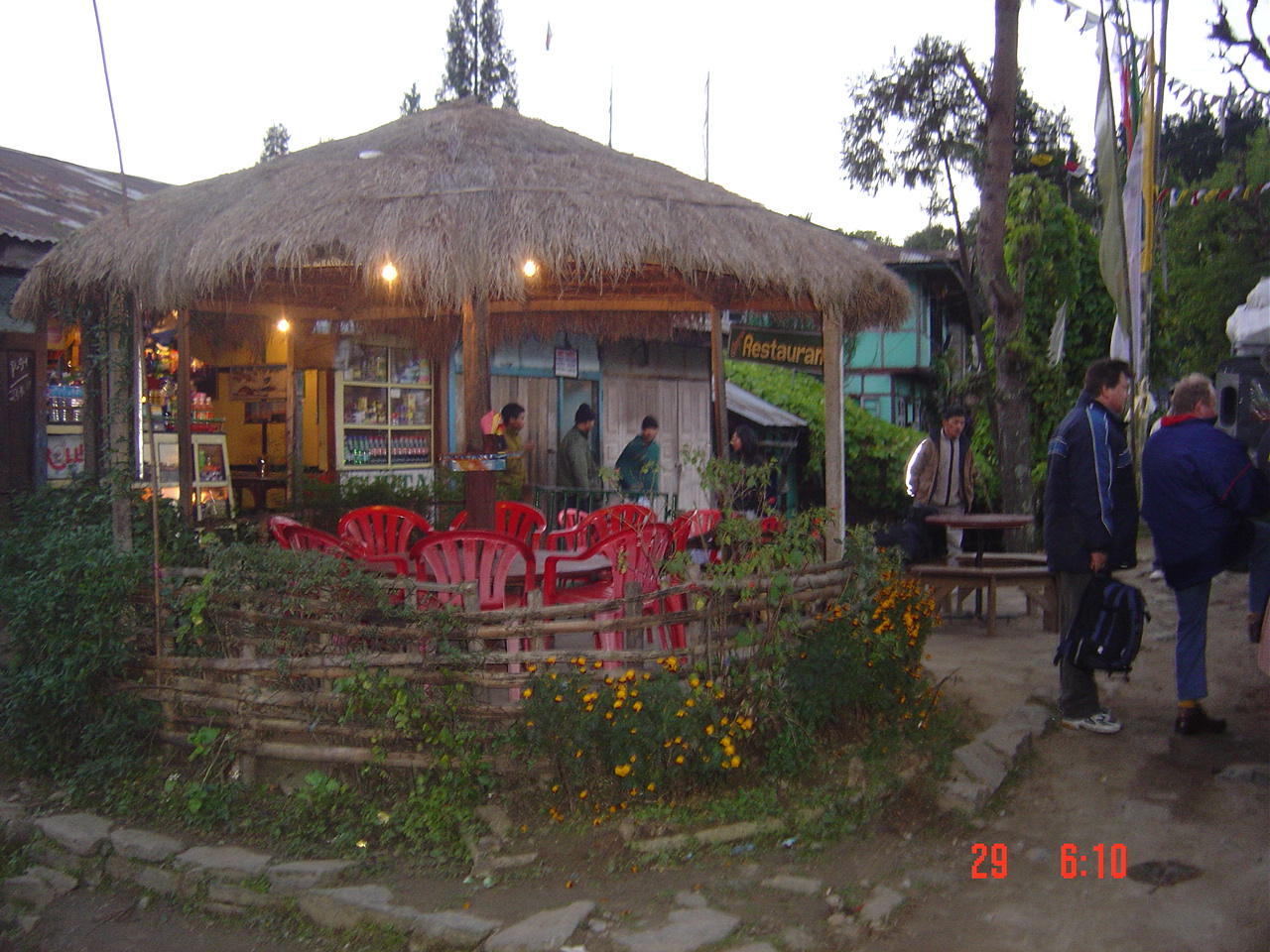
Gupta's Restaurant, Yuksom

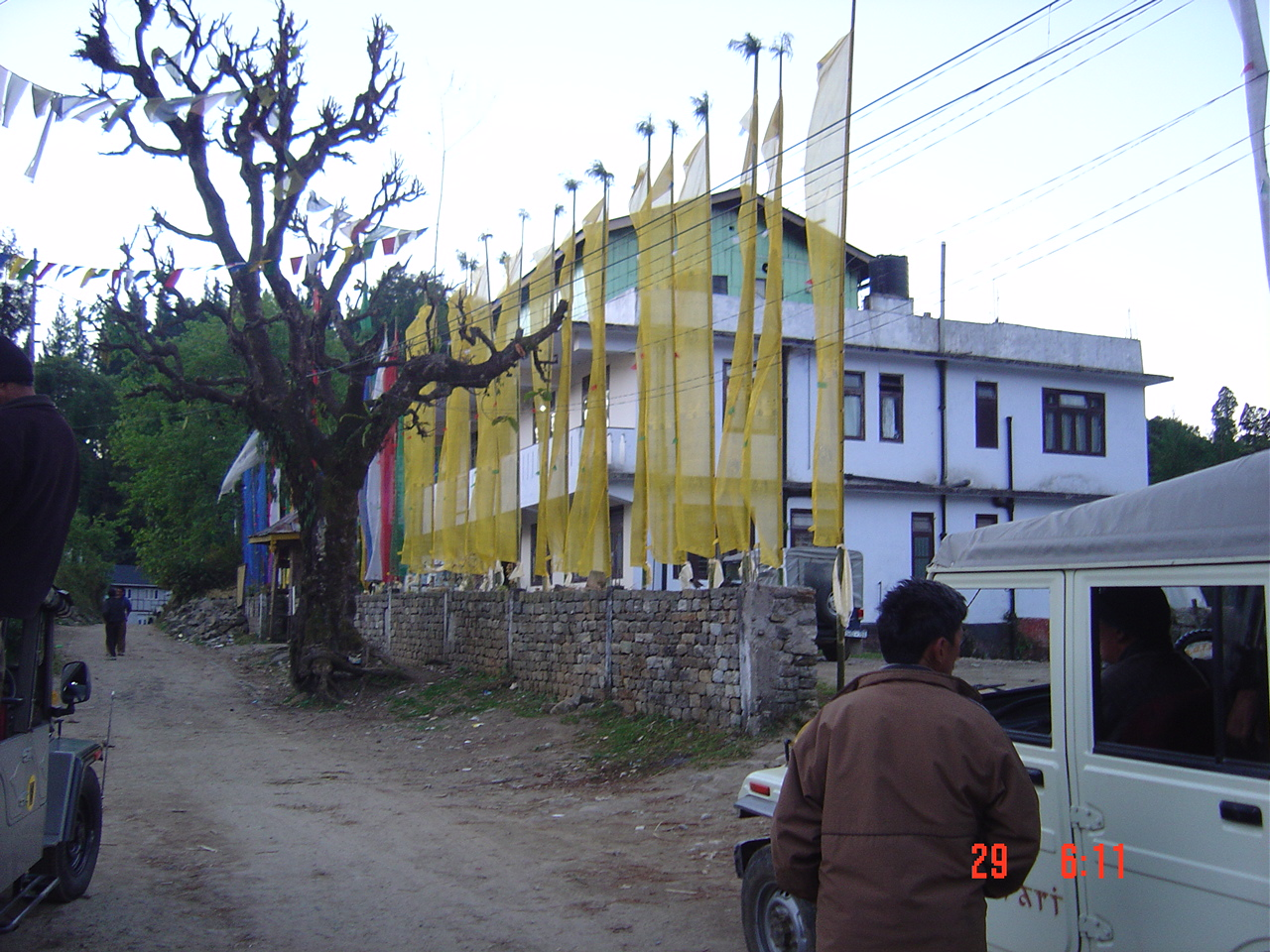
Hotel Demazong, Yuksom

The village has well-established primary and secondary schools, including three primary schools, one junior school, and one senior secondary school. Basic amenities, including primary health care, potable drinking water, gas and electricity supply, and postal and telegraph services, are also available.

The Yuksom–Dzongri trek is a high-altitude trek along the Rathong Chu River in West Sikkim. The route passes through dense forests, alpine lakes, and terminates at the Khangchendzonga. An ecotourism impact study of this route was carried out jointly by the Forest Department, the Mountain Institute, and the Khangchendzonga Conservation Committee (KCC), which is based in Yuksom. The route recorded a large number of visitors between 1990 and 2005, mostly from England, the United States, Germany, France, Australia, the Netherlands, and Switzerland. The main trekking seasons are March to May and September to November, with October being the peak month; visitor numbers are lower in January and February. Based on this study, additional trekking routes were planned to encourage year-round ecotourism. The suggested packages included the "Monsoon Magic" alpine treks and subtropical winter treks, intended to support the ecotourism economy while taking into account the carrying capacity of the region.

== Culture ==
=== Biodiversity festival ===
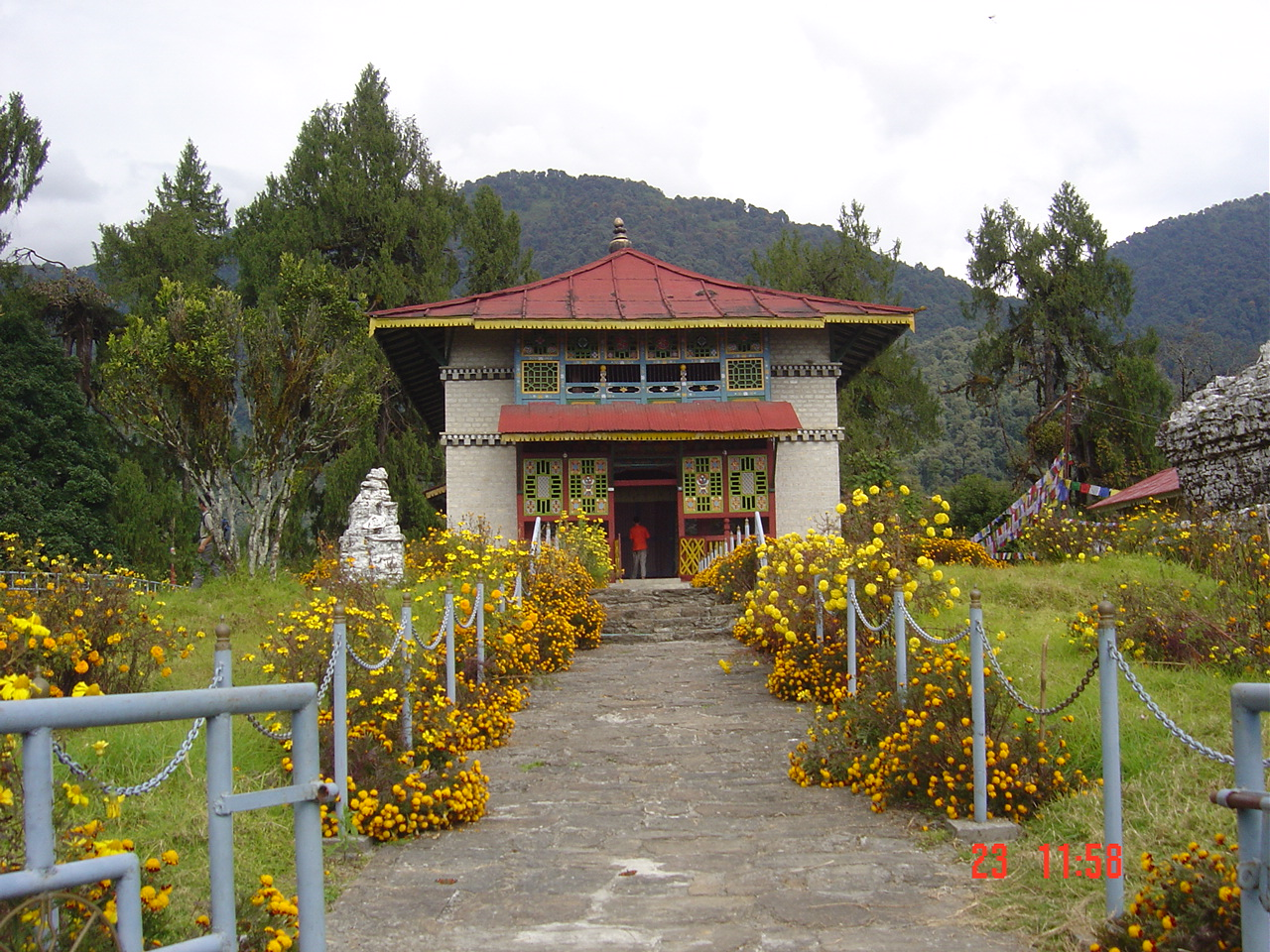
Dubdi Monastery

Following local conservation efforts, a one-day biodiversity festival was held at Yuksom by the KCC and the Forest Department of Government of Sikkim. The festival, described as the first of its kind in Sikkim, aimed to raise awareness among villagers about conserving cultural and natural heritage. It was attended by 200 villagers and some foreign tourists. The festival focused on pictorial exhibitions of the natural biodiversity and cultural heritage of the Rathong Chuu valley, conservation measures, and ecotourism along the Yuksom–Dzongri trekking route through the Khangchendzonga National Park. It also covered medicinal plants, pollution at Khecheopalri Lake and preservation measures, and the effects of deforestation and the need to preserve forest resources.

Dubdi Monastery, a Tibetan Buddhist monastery, is located near Yuksom, along with the smaller Mallu Monastery. Established in 1701, the Dubdi Monastery is the oldest monastery in Sikkim and is located on a hill about an hour's walk from Yuksom. It was also known as the Hermit's Cell, after its reclusive founder, Lhatsun Namkha Jigme.

== Gallery ==
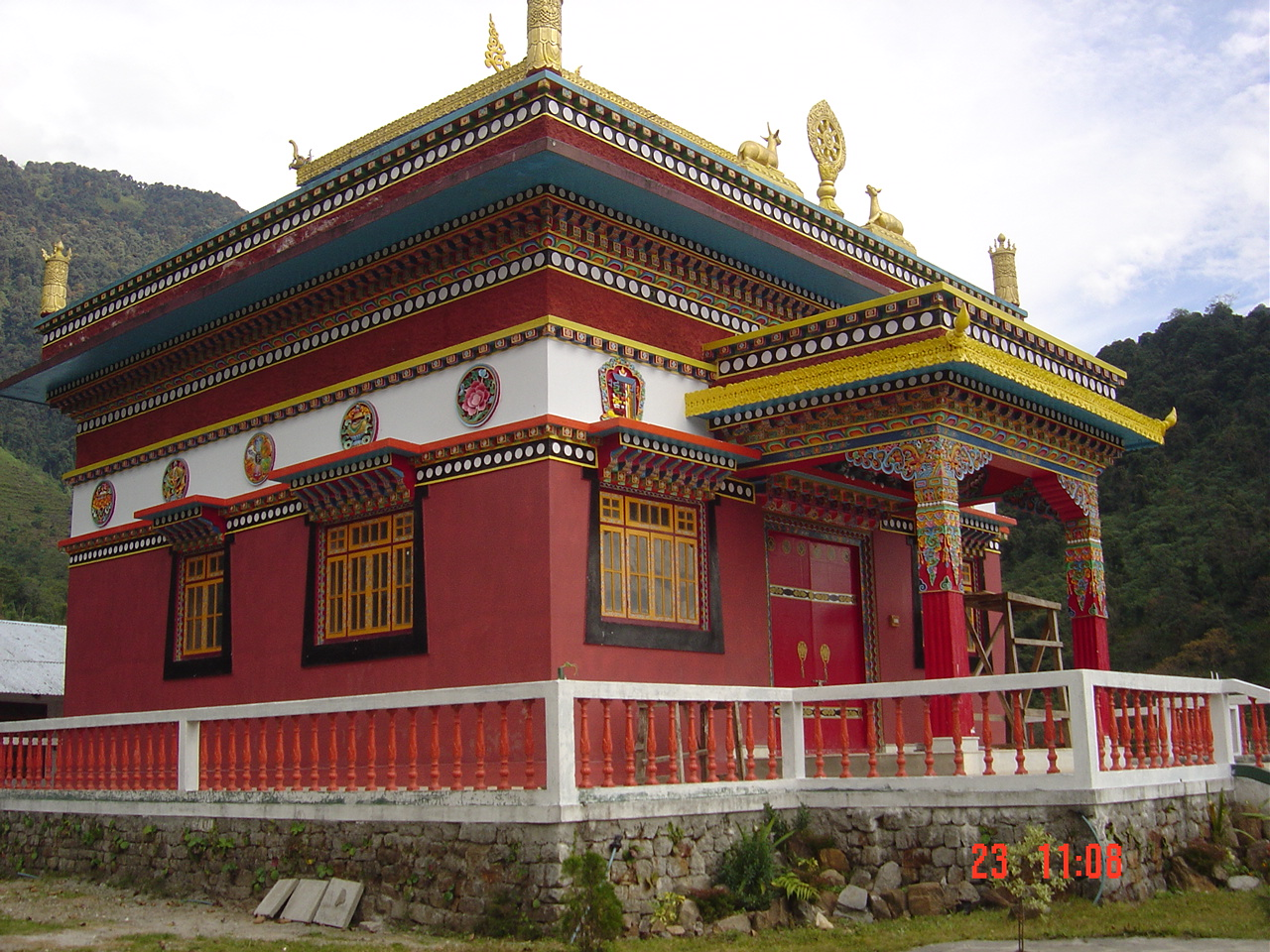
Kartok Monastery

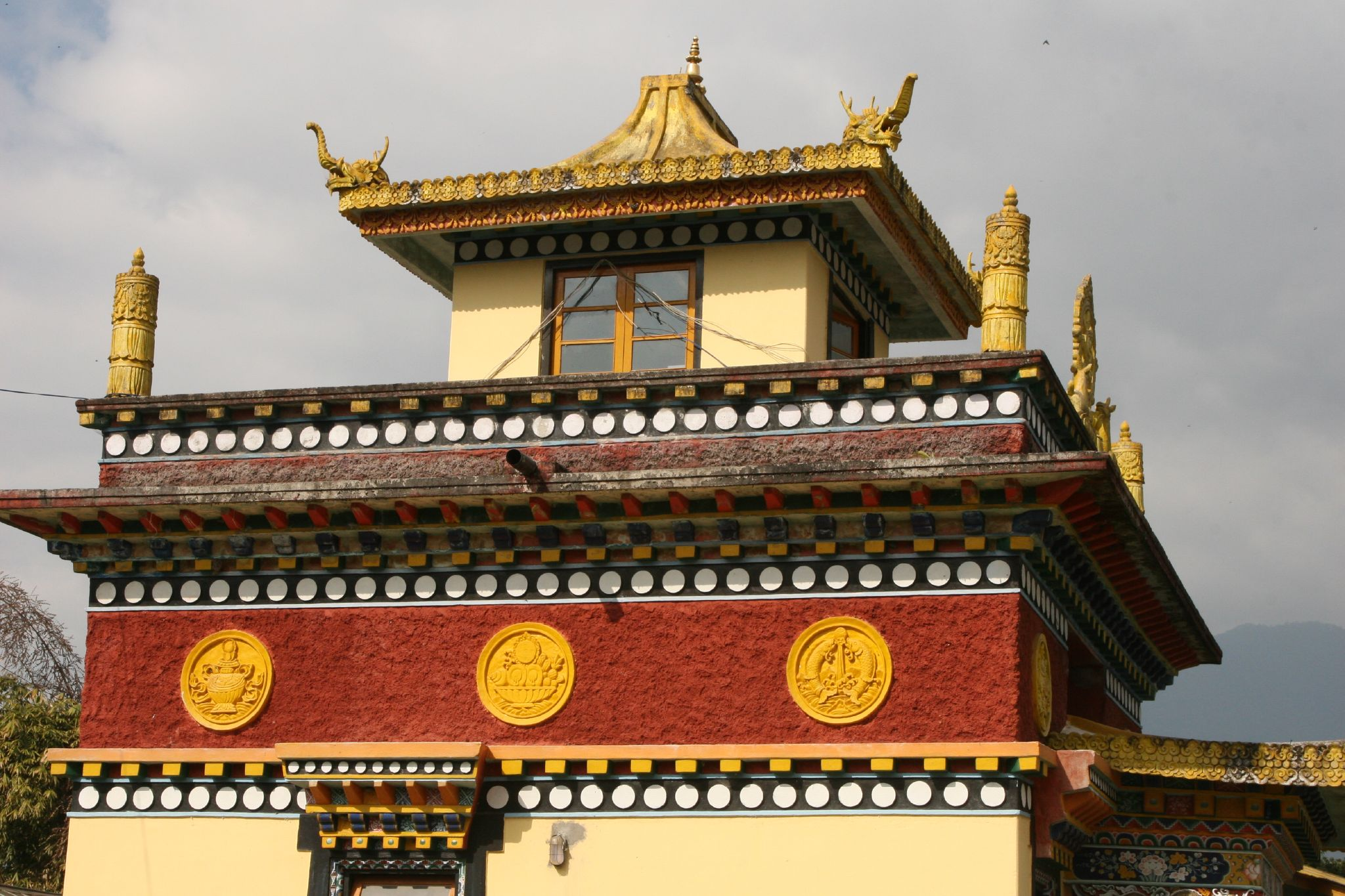
Ngadak Chenpo Chorling Gompa

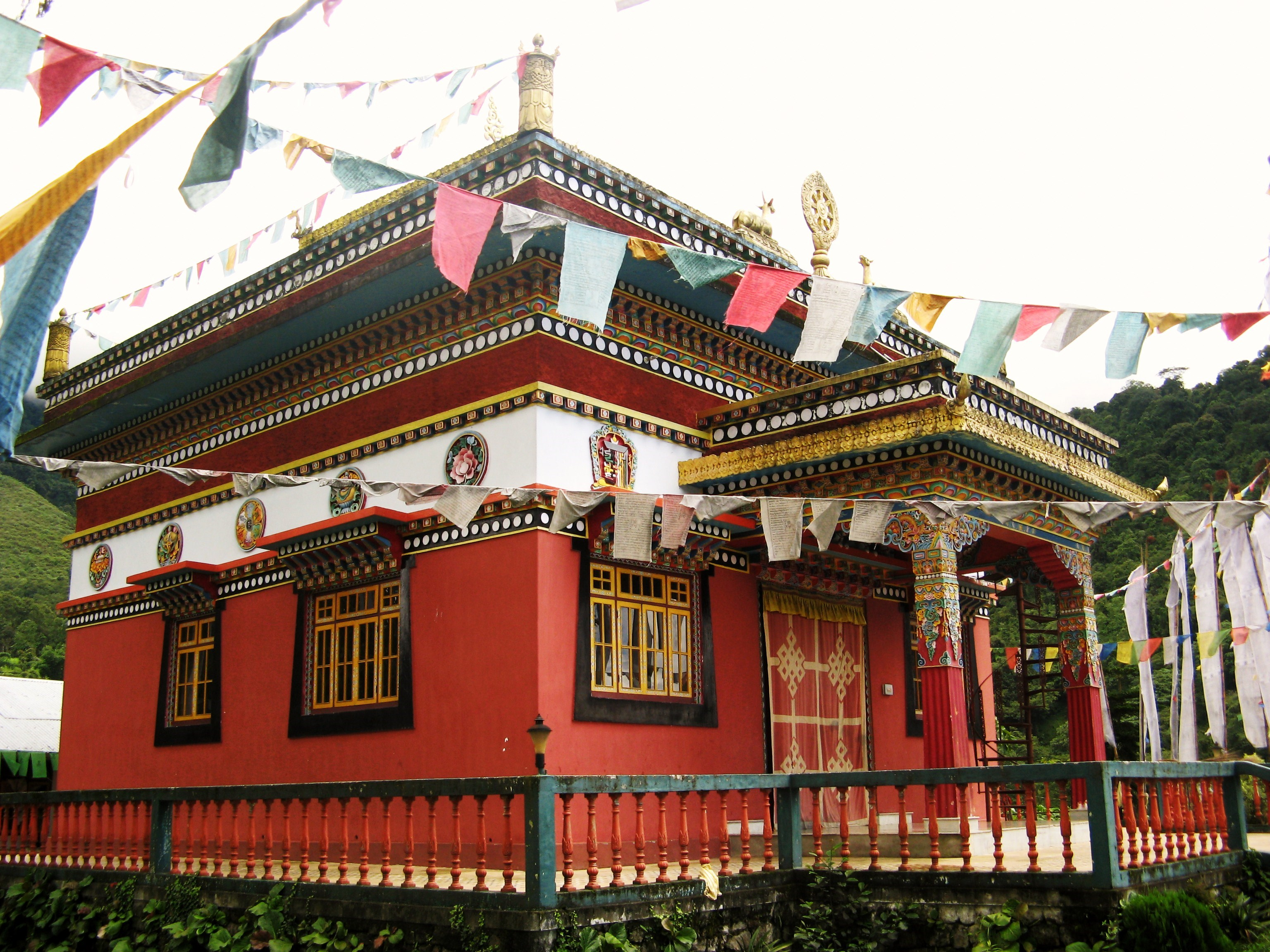
Kartok Gompa

== Films ==
- Singalila in the Himalaya
- Goecha La: In Search of Kangchenjunga by George Thengummoottil
