= Dubdi Monastery =

Buddhist monastery near Yuksom, Sikkim, India

Dubdi Monastery.
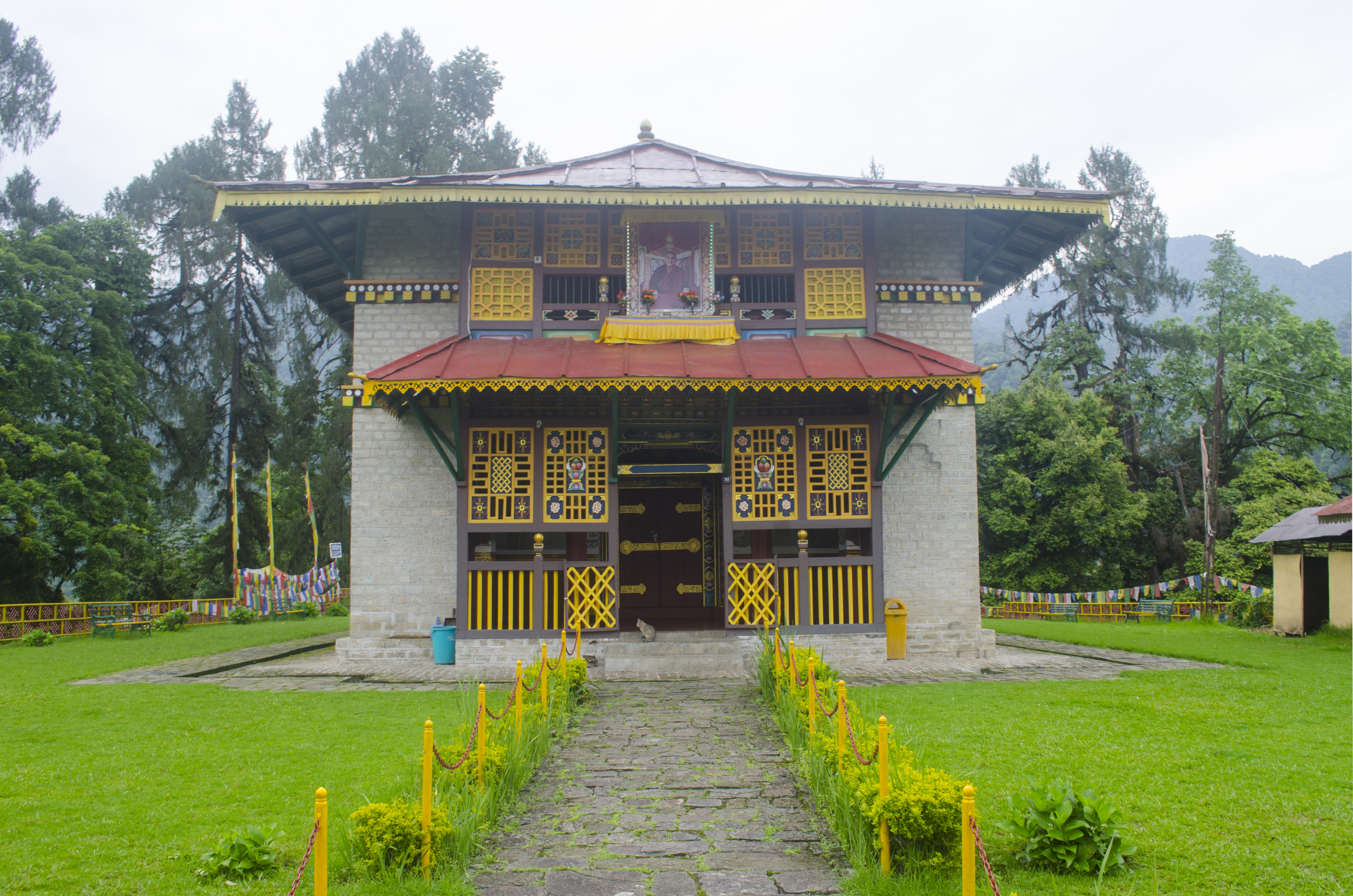
- Dubdi Monastery

- Location within India

Religion
- Affiliation: Tibetan Buddhism
- Sect: Nyingma

Location
- Location: Yuksom, Sikkim, India
- Country: India
- Interactive map of Dubdi Monastery.
- Coordinates: 27°04′N 88°28′E

Architecture
- Style: Tibetan
- Founder: Lhatsun Namkha Jigme
- Established: 1701; 325 years ago
- Yuksom, Norbugang Chorten, Norbugang Coronation Throne and the Kathok Lake are within its precincts

Dubdi Monastery, occasionally called Yuksom Monastery, is a Buddhist monastery of the Nyingma sect of Tibetan Buddhism near Yuksom, in the Geyzing subdivision of West Sikkim district, in Northeastern India.

The Chogyar Namgyal established the first monastery known as the Dubdi Monastery in 1701, at Yuksom in Sikkim, which is part of Buddhist religious pilgrimage circuit involving the Norbugang Chorten, Pemayangtse Monastery, the Rabdentse ruins, the Sanga Choeling Monastery, the Khecheopalri Lake and the Tashiding Monastery.

Established in 1701, it is professed to be the oldest monastery in Sikkim and is located on the top of a hill which is about an hour's walk (3 kilometres (1.9 mi)) from Yuksom. It was also known as the Hermit's Cell after its ascetic founder Lhatsun Namkha Jigme, who along with two other lamas from Tibet met at Norbugang near Yuksom and crowned Phuntsog Namgyal as the first King or Chogyal of Sikkim at Norbugang Yuksom in 1642. The literal meaning of 'Dubdi' in local language is "the retreat".

== History ==
Dubdi monastery is central to the history of Sikkim as it is closely linked to the founding of the State of Sikkim at Yuksom in the middle of the 17th century by Lhetsum Chenpo and his two associate lamas. Chenpo’s green image is enshrined in the Dubdi monastery as it was established by him to commemorate the founding of the Kingdom of Sikkim. It is the only monastery (purported now as the first monastery built in Sikkim) surviving out of the four built at that time, the other three locations are now identified by: a cluster of four juniper trees was the location where a monastery of Khardokpa sect existed; another location of a monastery established by Lama of Nadakpa sect now seen in the form of a rocky mound and two juniper trees, and the third site has now a chorten, which was originally the location of the residence of the King of Sikkim who was crowned at Yuksom by the three lamas. Monastery had thirty monks some time back. Now to gain access to the monastery, the only monk who stays in the monastery has to be informed in advance.

== Architecture ==
Dubdi stands at an altitude of 2,100 metres (7,000 ft) on a spur. Established during the reign of Chogyar Namgyal, the Monastery has an elaborately painted interior area. Images of divinities, saints, other symbols and collection of manuscripts and texts are housed in the monastery. The statues of three lamas who were responsible for establishing Yuksom are also installed in the monastery. It is a two storied structure built in stone. It is square in plan and faces south. It has a tapering tower with a flat roof made of iron sheets with projecting eaves. The top of the roof has a bell shaped gilded dome known as "Gyaltshen". The monastery has two side aisles where a rare collection of manuscripts and other ritual texts are preserved.

== Gallery ==
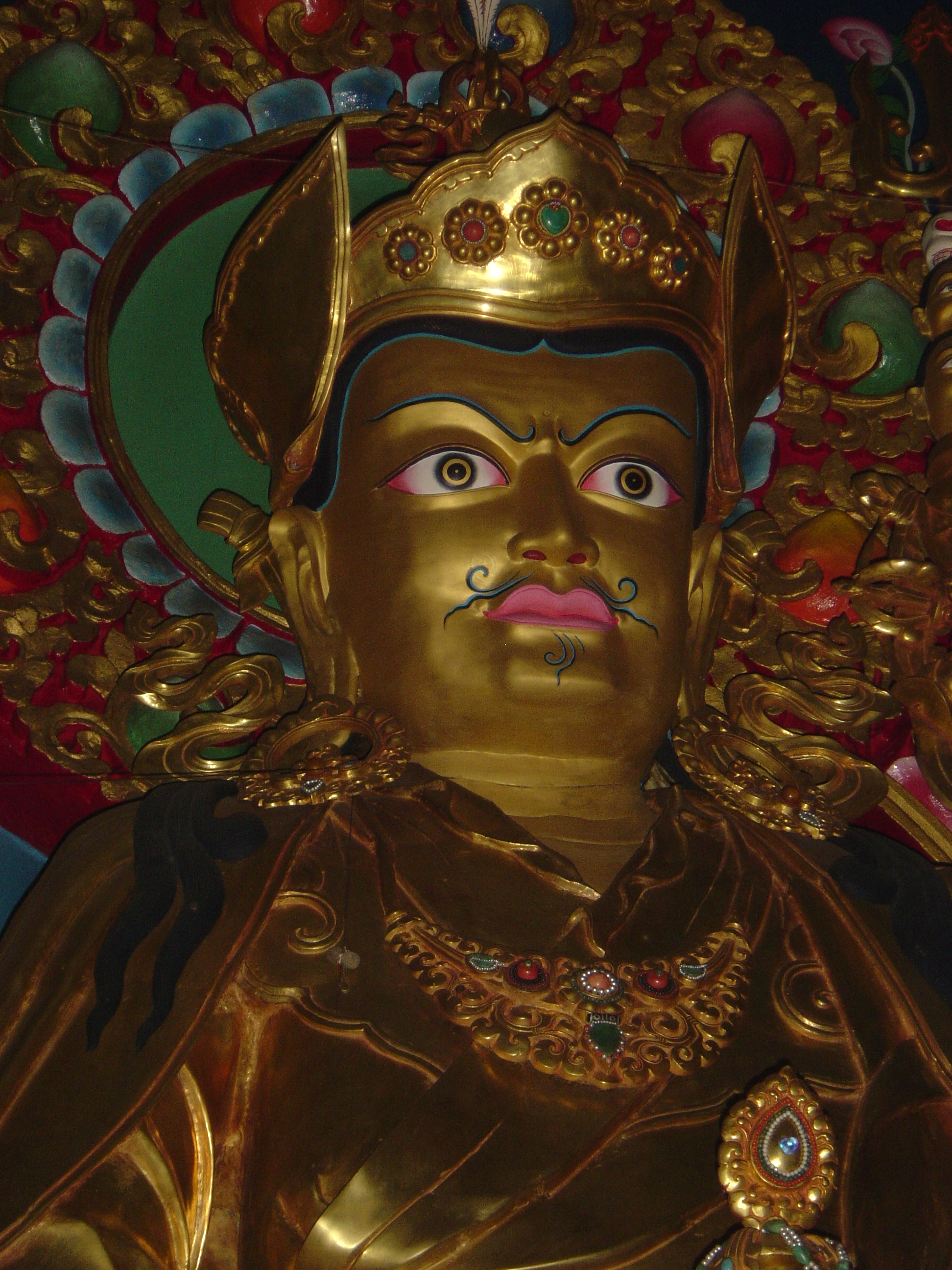

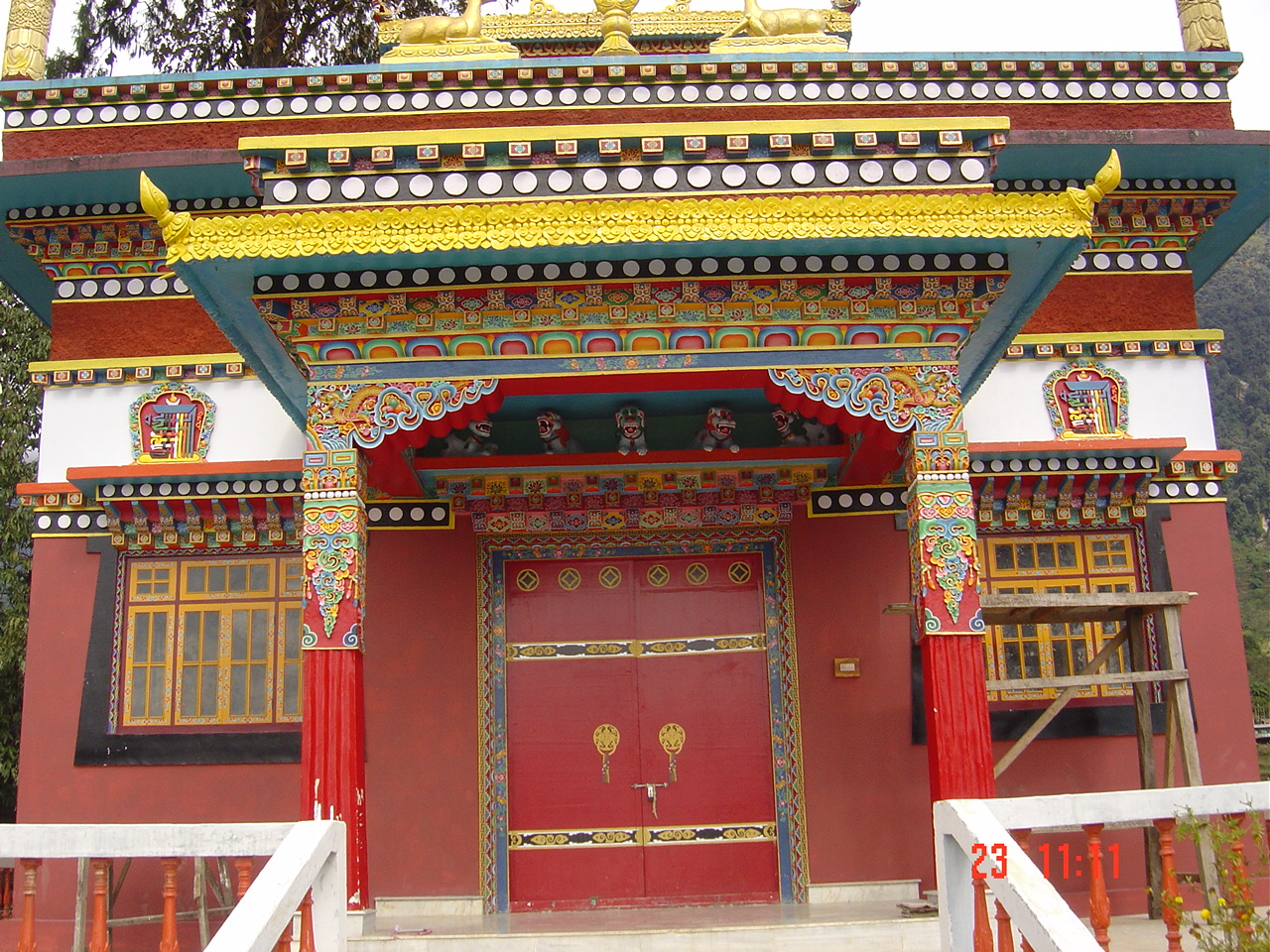

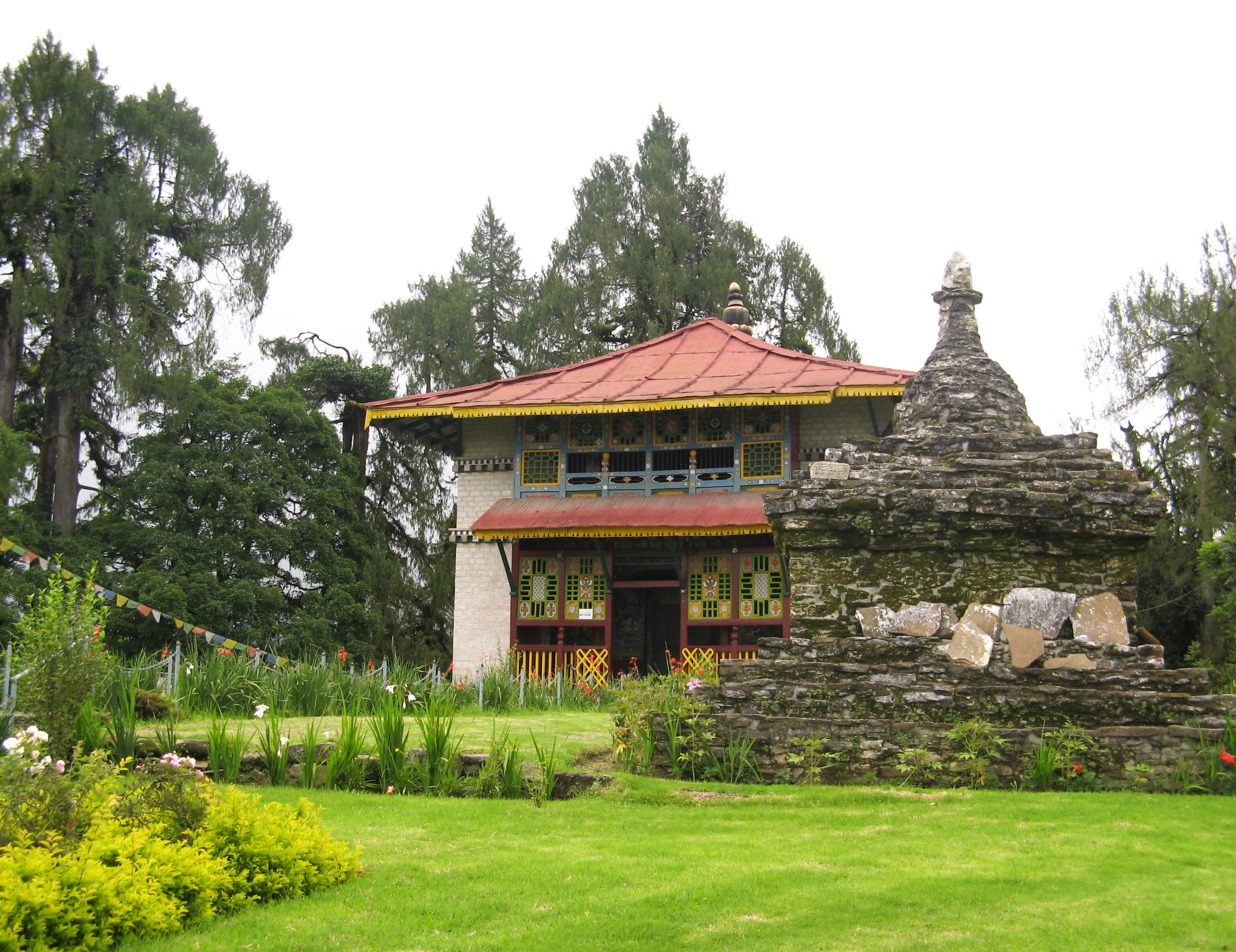
One of the three oldest monasteries built in 1701

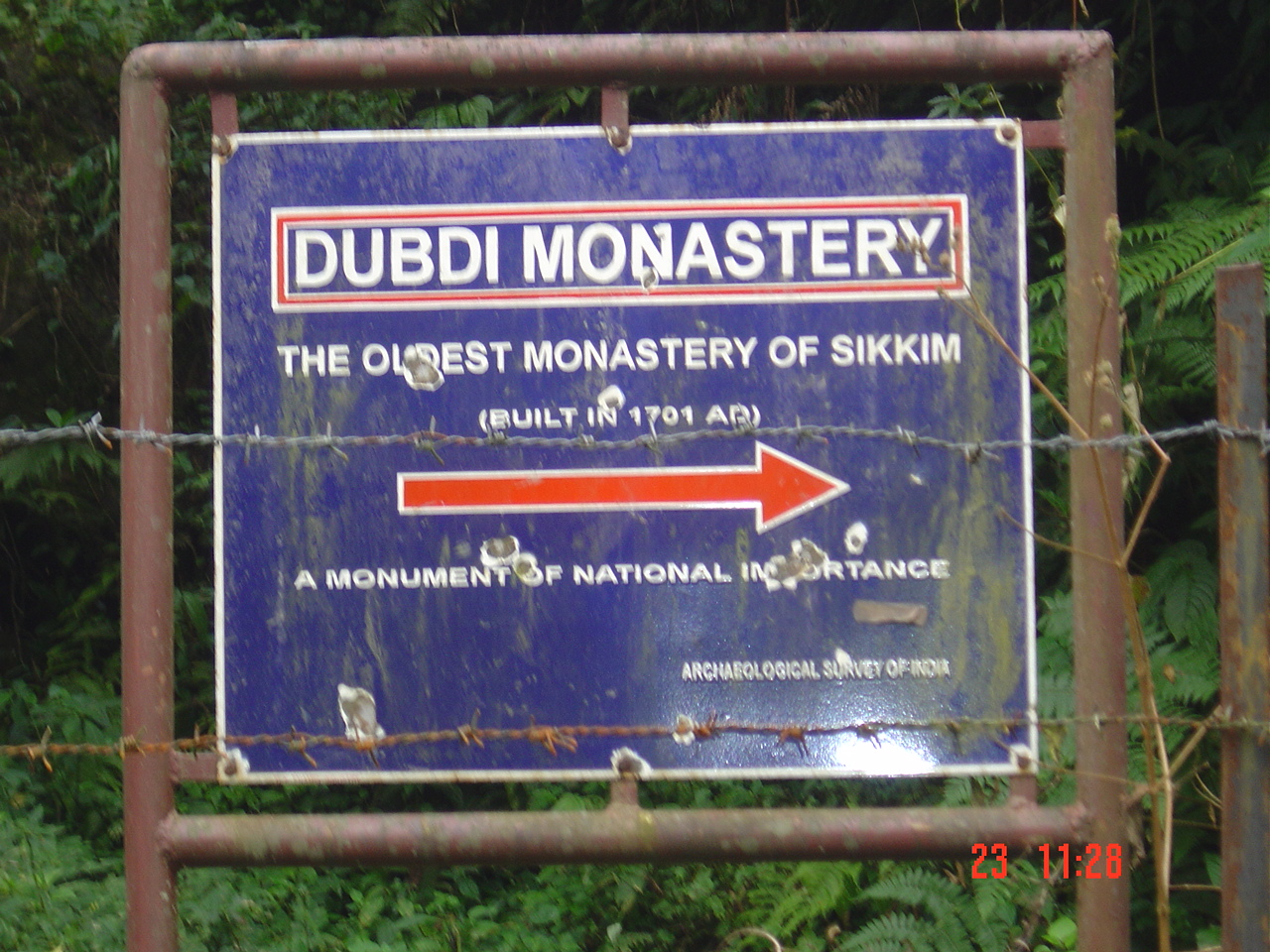

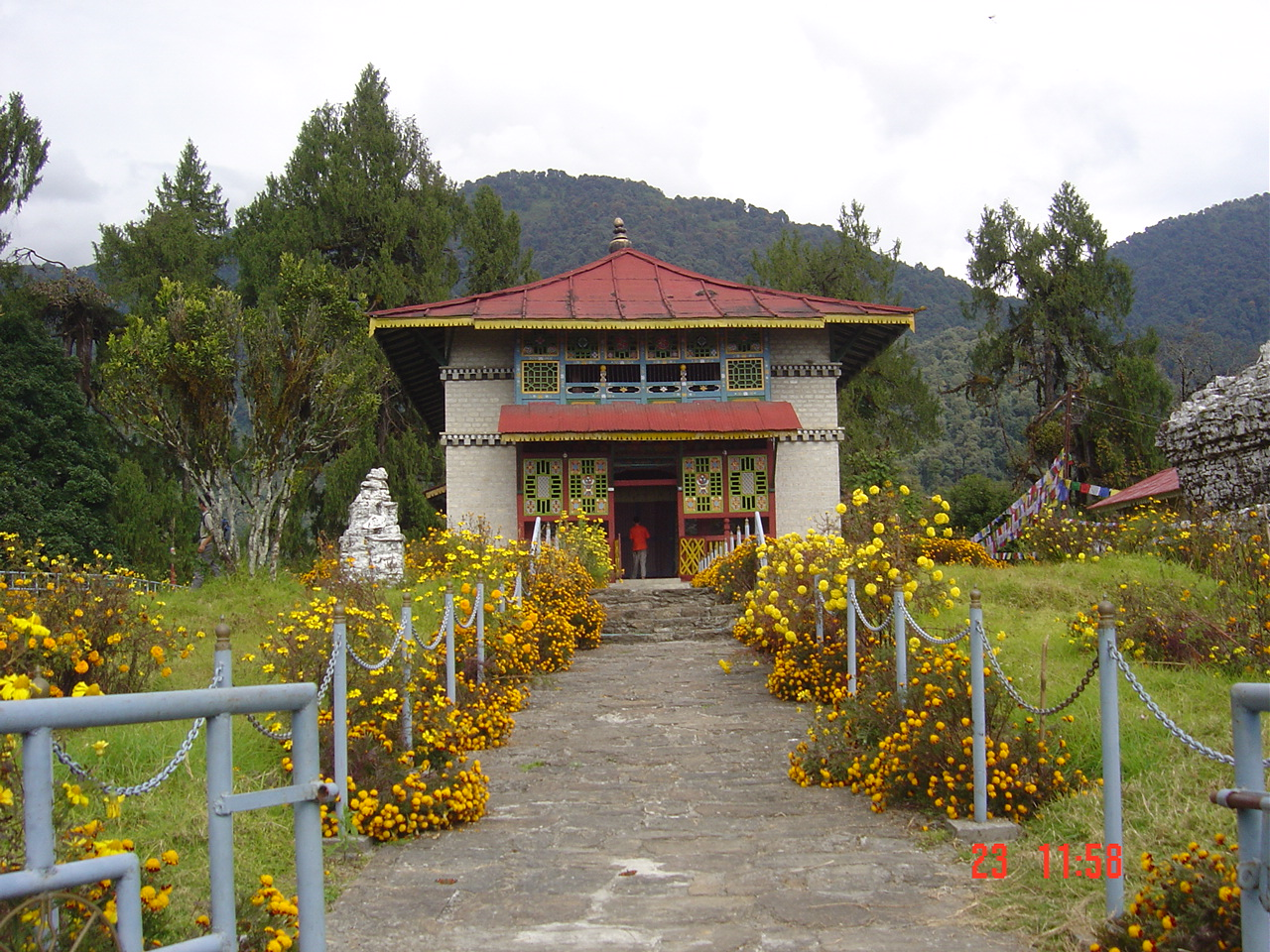

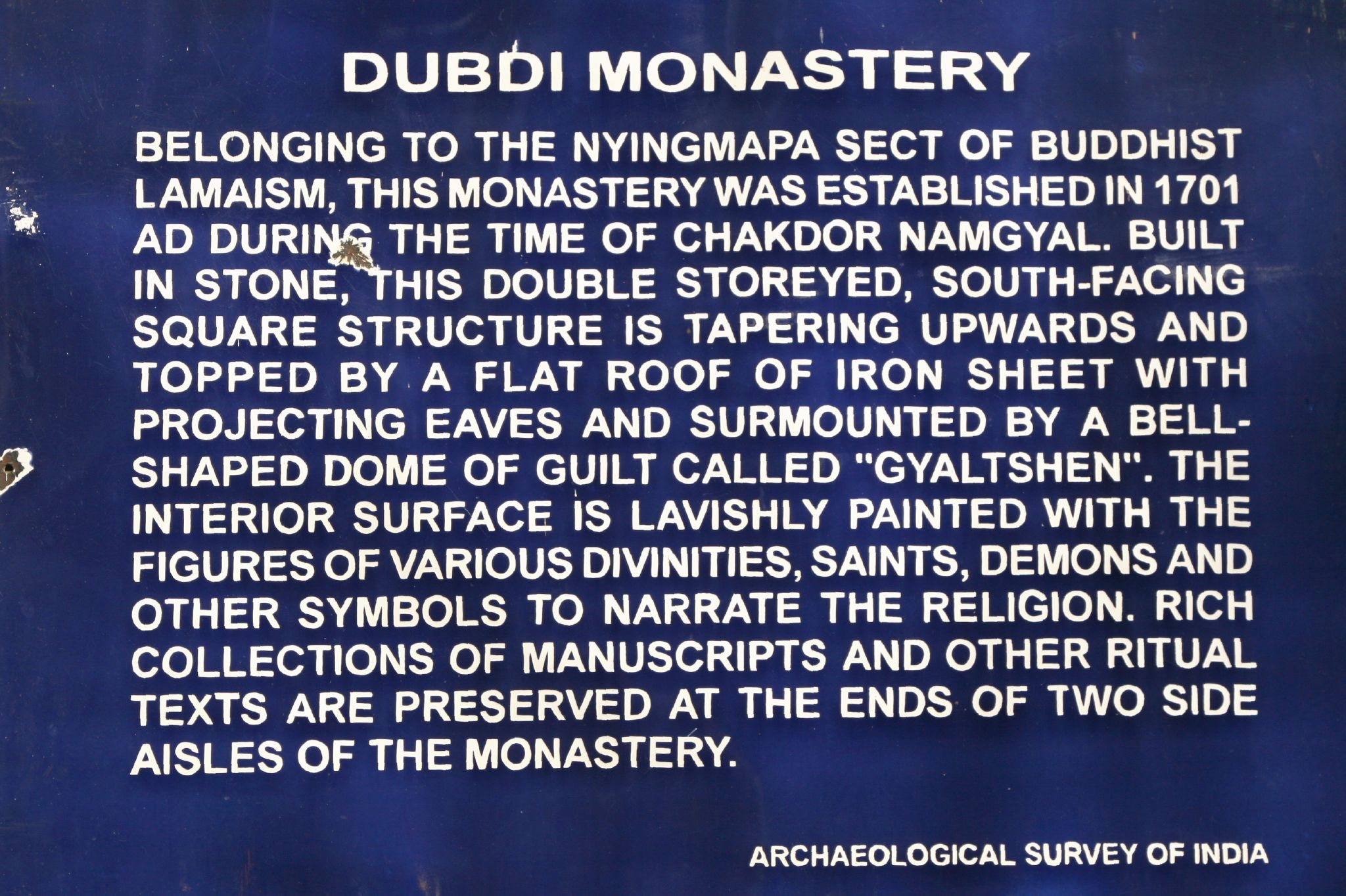
Plaque at Dubdi Monastery

== See also ==
- Buddhism
- Buddhist pilgrimage sites in India
- Gautama Buddha
- History of Buddhism in India
