= Rabdentse =

- town
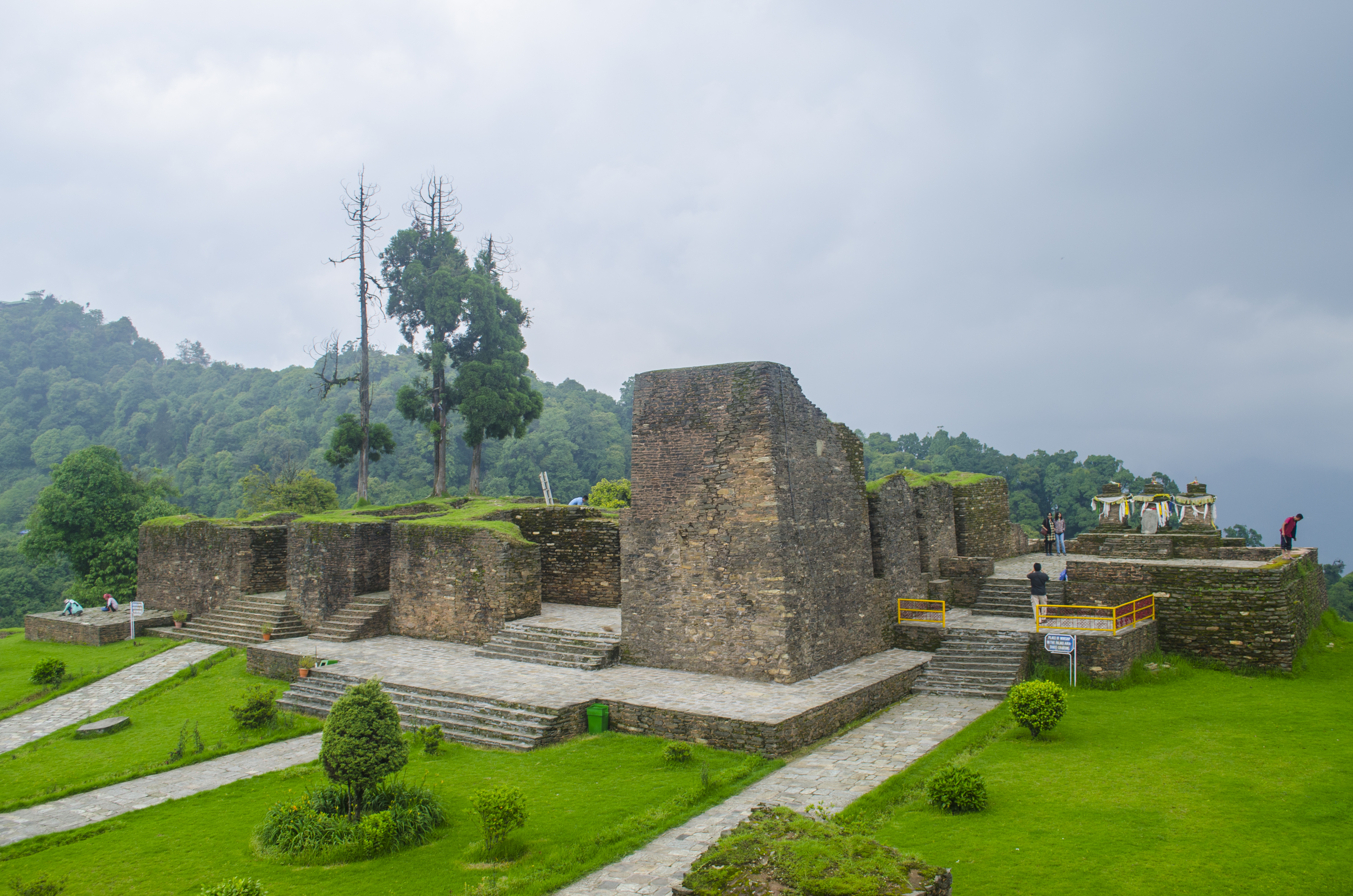
- Ruins of Rabdentse Palace

- Location in Sikkim, India Rabdentse (India)
- Coordinates: 27°18′04″N 88°15′14″E
- Country: India
- State: Sikkim
- District: West Sikkim

Languages
  - Official: Nepali, Bhutia, Lepcha, Limbu, Newari, Rai, Gurung, Mangar, Sherpa, Tamang and Sunwar
- Time zone: UTC+5:30 (IST)
- Vehicle registration: SK
- Nearest city: Pelling
- Vidhan Sabha constituency: West Sikkim

Rabdentse was the second capital of the former Kingdom of Sikkim from 1670 to 1814. The capital city was destroyed by the invading Gurkha army and only the ruins of the palace and the chortens are seen here now. However, the ruins of this city are seen close to Pelling and in West Sikkim district in the Northeastern Indian state of present-day Sikkim; Pemayangtse Monastery is one of the oldest monasteries in Sikkim which is close to the ruins. From the vantage point of this former capital, superb views of the Khanchendzonga ranges can be witnessed. This monument has been declared as of national importance by the Archaeological Survey of India. It was first established in 1670 by the 2nd Chogyal Tensung Namgyal son of the 1st Chogyal Phuntsog Namgyal by shifting from the first capital of Yuksom that was consecrated in 1642.

The Rabdentse ruins are part of Buddhist religious pilgrimage circuit starting with the first monastery at Yuksom known as the Dubdi Monastery, followed by Norbugang Chorten, Tashiding Monastery, the Pemayangtse Monastery, the Sanga Choeling Monastery, and the Khecheopalri Lake.

== History ==
Phuntsog Namgyal, the first Chogyal or King of Sikkim, was consecrated as king of Sikkim at Yuksom and succeeded by his son, Tensung Namgyal in 1670. The reign of the Chogyal was peaceful and saw the capital shifted from Yuksom to Rabdentse. The Namgyal had three wives – a Tibetan, a Bhutanese and a Limbu girl. The Limbu girl, daughter of the Limbu chief Yo Yo-Hang had inducted seven girls from her family who all married into noble Sikkim families. Many of them became councillors to the King and were given the title Kazi, which gave them enormous powers and privileges.

The king's second wife's son Chador Namgyal, took over the reins of power in Sikkim, after his father's death, in 1700. He was a minor at that time. This outraged his elder half-sister Pendiongmu (daughter of the first wife of Tensung Namgyal), of Bhutanese descent, who opposed the succession and with help from Bhutan evicted Chador. Chador fled to Tibet (Yungthing Yeshe, a loyal Minister escorted the minor king to Lhasa) where he remained in exile for ten years before returning and reclaiming his lost territory with the help of the Tibetans.

While in Lhasa, Chador Namgyal became very proficient in Buddhism and Tibetan literature, and also became the state astrologer to the Sixth Dalai Lama. During his exile, the Sixth Dalai Lama pleased with the erudition of Chador Namgyal had conferred on his exclusive rights to an estate in Tibet. During this period, the son of Yugthing Yeshe (who had saved Chador and taken him to Tibet) was imprisoned by the Bhutanese in Rabdentse. Tibet intervened in the matter and also prevailed on King Deb of Bhutan to withdraw from Sikkim. Chador Namgyal then returned to Rebdantse and the small forces of Bhutan which remained were forced to withdraw. During this period, Sikkim lost some areas in its south-eastern region since Bhutan had colonized the area.

Pedi, the Chogyal's half-sister, had not given up on her enmity against her half brother Chador. With the help of a medicinal man from Tibet, she got Chador Namgyal murdered in 1716 through mysterious bloodletting from the main artery while the king was on a holiday at the Ralang hot water spring. Immediately, the royal armed forces executed the Tibetan doctor and also put Pedi to death by strangling her with a silk scarf.

Gurmed Namgyal succeeded his father Chadok in 1717. Gurmed's reign saw many skirmishes between the Nepalese and Sikkimese. He had Rabdentse fortified to prevent invasions by the Gurkhas (Nepalese) and Bhutanese. Besides, a local Magar chieftain Tashi Bidur had also rebelled but was subdued.died in 1733 at the young age of 26. Since he did not have any legitimate children, on his death bed he conveyed that a nun at Sanga Cheoling was carrying his child (this is said to be the story concocted by the Lamas to perpetuate the Namgyal dynasty). Subsequently, the nun gave birth to a male child who was accepted as heir to Gurmed and was given the name Phuntsog, after the first temporal and the spiritual head of Sikkim.

Phunstog Namgyal II, the illegitimate child of Gurmed, succeeded his father to the throne in 1733. His reign was tumultuous as he was faced with attacks by the Bhutanese and the Nepalese, apart from rebellions within Sikkim from Magars and the Tsongas in 1752. Since Namgyal II was a weak king, the Nepalese had made 17 invasions against Sikkim. Bhutan had also attacked Sikkim and occupied areas east of Tista River; however, they later withdrew to present frontiers after negotiations held at Rhenock.

Tenzing Namgyal, the next king was also a weak ruler, and his sovereignty saw most of Sikkim being appropriated by Nepal. The Chogyal was forced to flee from Rabdentse to Lhasa where he died in 1780. Tshudpud Namgyal, his son returned to Sikkim in 1793 to reclaim the throne with the help of China. Finding Rabdentse too close to the Nepalese border, he shifted the capital to Tumlong. Consequent to the repeated attacks by the Bhutanese and Nepalese over the many invasions, the capital city was reduced to ruins by the liberating army of Nepal.

== Structures ==
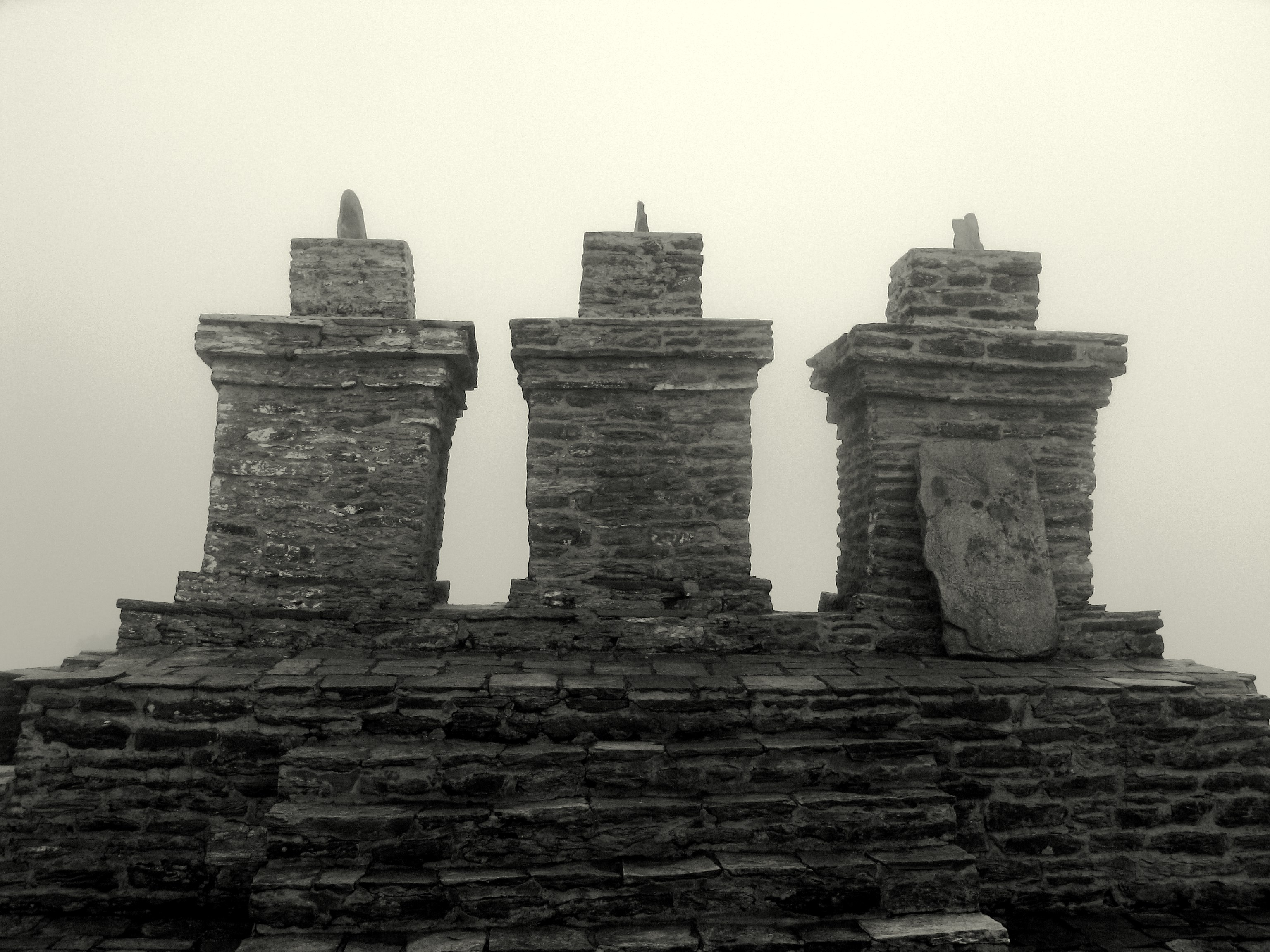
The Three Chortens where the royal family of Sikkim used to offer prayers to their deities at Rabdentse palace

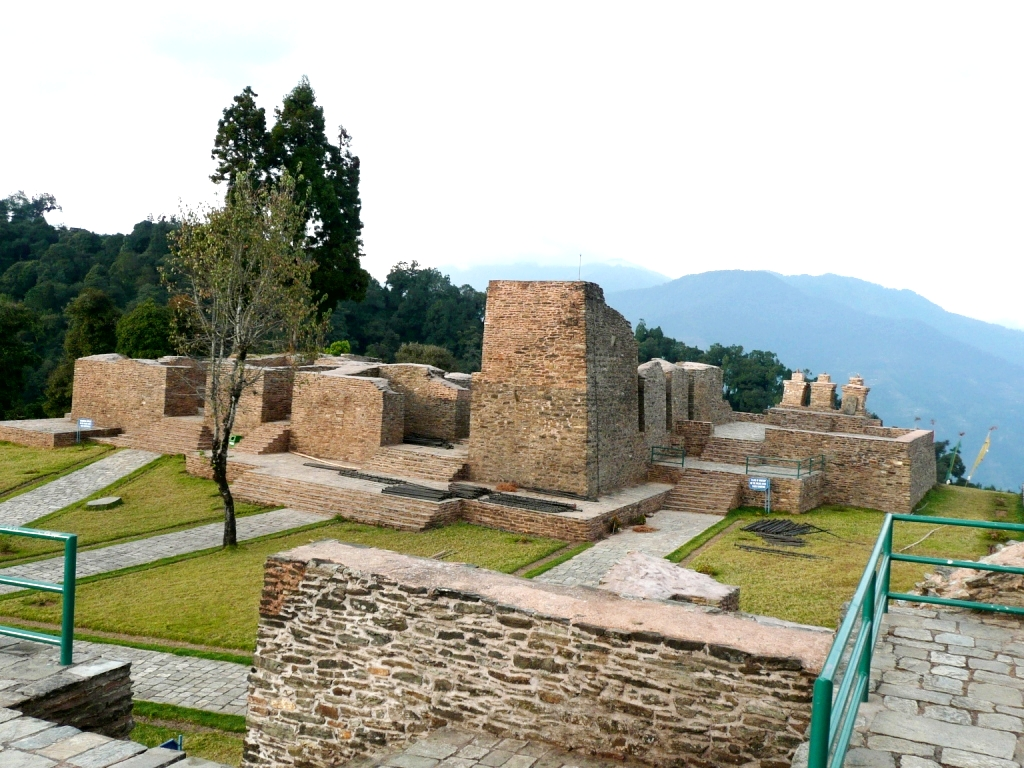
Rabdentse Palace ruins

The ruins seen now in Rabdentse consist mainly of "chunky wall stubs" whose heritage value is accentuated by its location on a ridge, near upper Pelling (3 kilometres (1.9 mi) away) from where commanding views of the Kanchendzong hill ranges and surroundings on one side and the mountains and valleys on the other side are visible. The approach to this location is from an ornamental yellow gate near the Pelling–Geyshing road, from where it is a walking distance of about 15 minutes through a lake and forested hills.

Along the trek path from the gate, an avenue of chestnut trees with sodden moss leads to a stone throne comprising three standing stones called "Namphogang", which was the pulpit of the judges from where judgments were pronounced during the active days of the king's reign from Rabdentse. Further ahead, the 'Taphap Chorten' is seen in the semi-ruined condition. This was the entry point to the palace and people seeking access to the palace had to dismount from their horses and remove their hat as a mark of respect to the King here. The palace ruins are at the center of the fourth courtyard.

The ruins of the palace are made up of two of the northern and southern wings. The northern wing was the residence of the royal family. This wing has an open quadrangle where the "Dab Lhagang", now in ruins, is also seen; the royal family used to offer prayers with incense to their deities here. A white marble slab of size 7 feet (2.1 m)x5 feet (1.5 m) (reported to have been shifted from the river and carried by a single person ) is also seen at this location, which was once the location of the monastery known as "Risum Gompa".

Next to the ruins of the palace are three chortens, religious sites where members of the royal family offered incense to the deities. The chortens are in a fair state of preservation. On the southern wing, common people were given an audience by the king, which is obvious from the stone throne seen here. The Archaeological Survey of India has declared Rabdentse as a heritage monument and has undertaken the needed preservation and restoration measures.

== See also ==
- History of Sikkim
