= National Highway 710 (India) =

Highway in Sikkim, India

National Highway 710
- Map of the National Highway in red

Route information
- Length: 47 km (29 mi)

Major junctions
- South end: Melli
- North end: Tarku

Location
- Country: India
- States: Sikkim

Highway system
- Roads in India; Expressways; National; State; Asian
← NH 10	→ NH 510

National Highway 710, commonly referred to as NH 710 is a national highway in India. It is a spur road of National Highway 10. NH-710 traverses the state of Sikkim in India.

== Route ==
Melli - Manpur- Namchi - Damthang - Tarku.

== Junctions ==
NH 10 Terminal near Tashiview point.
NH 510 Terminal near Tarku.

== See also ==
- List of national highways in India
- List of national highways in India by state
