= Tarku =

Tarku may refer to:

- Tarku, India
- Tarku, Nepal
- Tarku, another name for Tarki in Russian Daghestan
