= National Highway 510 (India) =

National highway in India

National Highway 510
- Map of the National Highway in red

Route information
- Length: 70 km (43 mi)

Major junctions
- East end: Singtam
- West end: Gyalshing

Location
- Country: India
- States: Sikkim

Highway system
- Roads in India; Expressways; National; State; Asian
← NH 10	→ NH 510

National Highway 510, commonly referred to as NH 510 is a national highway in India. It is a spur road of National Highway 10. NH-510 traverses the state of Sikkim in India. The highway is being maintained by the NHIDCL.

== Route ==
Singtam - Tarku - Ravangla - Legship - Gyalshing.

== Junctions ==
NH 10 Terminal near Singtam.

== See also ==
- List of national highways in India
- List of national highways in India by state
