= Manjhitar =

- Town
- Location in Sikkim, India Manjhitar (India)
- Coordinates: 27°7′0″N 88°19′0″E
- Country: India
- State: Sikkim
- District: Namchi
- Elevation: 278 m (912 ft)

Languages
  - Official: Nepali, Bhutia, Lepcha, Limbu, Newari, Rai, Gurung, Mangar, Sherpa, Tamang and Sunwar
- Time zone: UTC+5:30 (IST)
- Vehicle registration: SK
- Coastline: 0 kilometres (0 mi)

Manjhitar is a small town in the Indian state of Sikkim. It is under the jurisdiction of the district of Namchi. The Sikkim Manipal University is situated here.

== Geography ==
It is located at 27°7′0″N 88°19′0″E at an elevation of 278 m above MSL.
