= Lingmo =

Coordinates: 27.3502°N 88.4525°E

Lingmoo is a village in South District of Sikkim, India. It is 50.4 km from Gangtok, capital of Sikkim. It falls under Ravangla sub-division. Lingmoo is divided into upper-Lingmoo, Pepthang, Tokday, Kolthang, Mangzing, and blocks. Tokday has 265 households with population of 1,339, of which 680 are males and 659 are females as per Census 2011. Kolthang has 241 households with 1,249 population, of which 634 are males and 615 are females as per 2011 Census. Mangzing has 216 homes with 1,134 population, of which 599 are males and 535 are females as per Census 2011. A total of 59 families reside in Lingmo block as per Government of India 2011 Census. It has a population of 297, of which 161 are males and 136 are females as per 2011 Census. Lingmo has a literacy rate of 75.30%. The village has of mixed population of Hindus, Buddhists, and Christians. Male literacy stands at 80.43% and female literacy at 68.81%. The village is administered by Panchayat President. It lies within Yangang-Rangang constituency of Sikkim Legislative Assembly. Lingmoo is divided into Mangzing, Kolthang and Tokday blocks of the constituency.

It has a Government Senior Secondary school, a junior high school, and several Primary Schools. Green-Vale Academy is one reputed private school situated within the village
