= Kewwzing Monastery =

Religion
- Affiliation: Tibetan Buddhism

Location
- Location: Sikkim, India
- Country: India

Kewwzing Monastery is a Bon Buddhist monastery in Sikkim, northeastern India. It was founded in 1974 by Gomchhen Ongden, the Head Lama of Tashiding Monastery. It is one of only two Bon monasteries in India.
