= Ralang Monastery =

Buddhist monastery in Sikkim, India

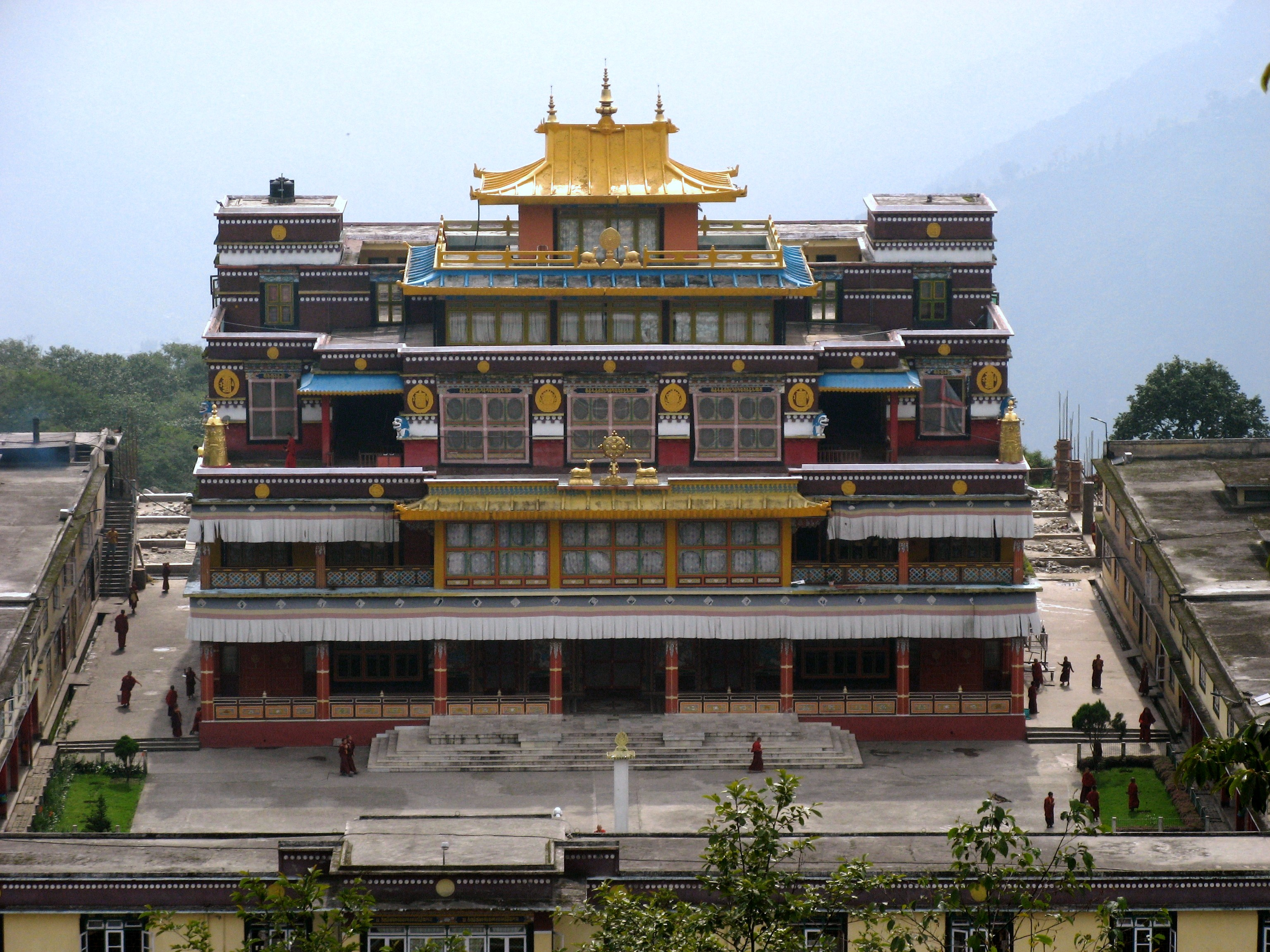
- New Ralang Monastery

- Location within Sikkim

Religion
- Affiliation: Tibetan Buddhism
- Sect: Kagyu
- Festivals: Pang Lhabsol, Chaam Dance (15th of the 7th month and 29th of the 10th month), Mahakala (9th month)

Location
- Location: South Sikkim, Sikkim, India
- Country: India
- Interactive map of Ralang Monastery
- Coordinates: 27°19′42″N 88°20′05″E

Architecture
- Established: 1768; 258 years ago
- Completed: 1995

New Ralang Monastery or Ralong Palchen Choling is a Buddhist monastery of the Kagyu sect of Tibetan Buddhism in southern Sikkim, northeastern India. It is located six kilometres from Ravangla. Ralang Monastery has an extensive collection of paintings and thangkas.

== Construction ==
The old monastery underwent reconstruction in 1975-1981 and in 1995, this new monastery, known as Palchen Choeling Monastic Institute was built by the 12th Gyaltsab Rinpoche, which retained its Tibetan architecture. The older Ralang Gompa or Karma Rabtenling monastery is located close west of this new monastery.

== Festival ==
Ralang Monastery is host to an annual festival, known as Pang Lhabsol when Mount Kangchenjunga is worshipped usually in September and ending in early December with the Kagyed.

== See also ==
- Tashiding Monastery
