= Parbing =

- town
- Location in Sikkim, India
- Coordinates: 27.3570°N 88.5858°E
- Country: India
- State: Sikkim
- District: Namchi

Languages
  - Official: Nepali, Bhutia, Lepcha, Limbu, Newari, Rai, Gurung, Mangar, Sherpa, Tamang and Sunwar
- Time zone: UTC+5:30 (IST)
- Vehicle registration: SK

Parbing is a small town in the Namchi district of the Indian state of Sikkim.
