= Ravangla =

Town in Sikkim, India

Ravangla Rabong
- Town
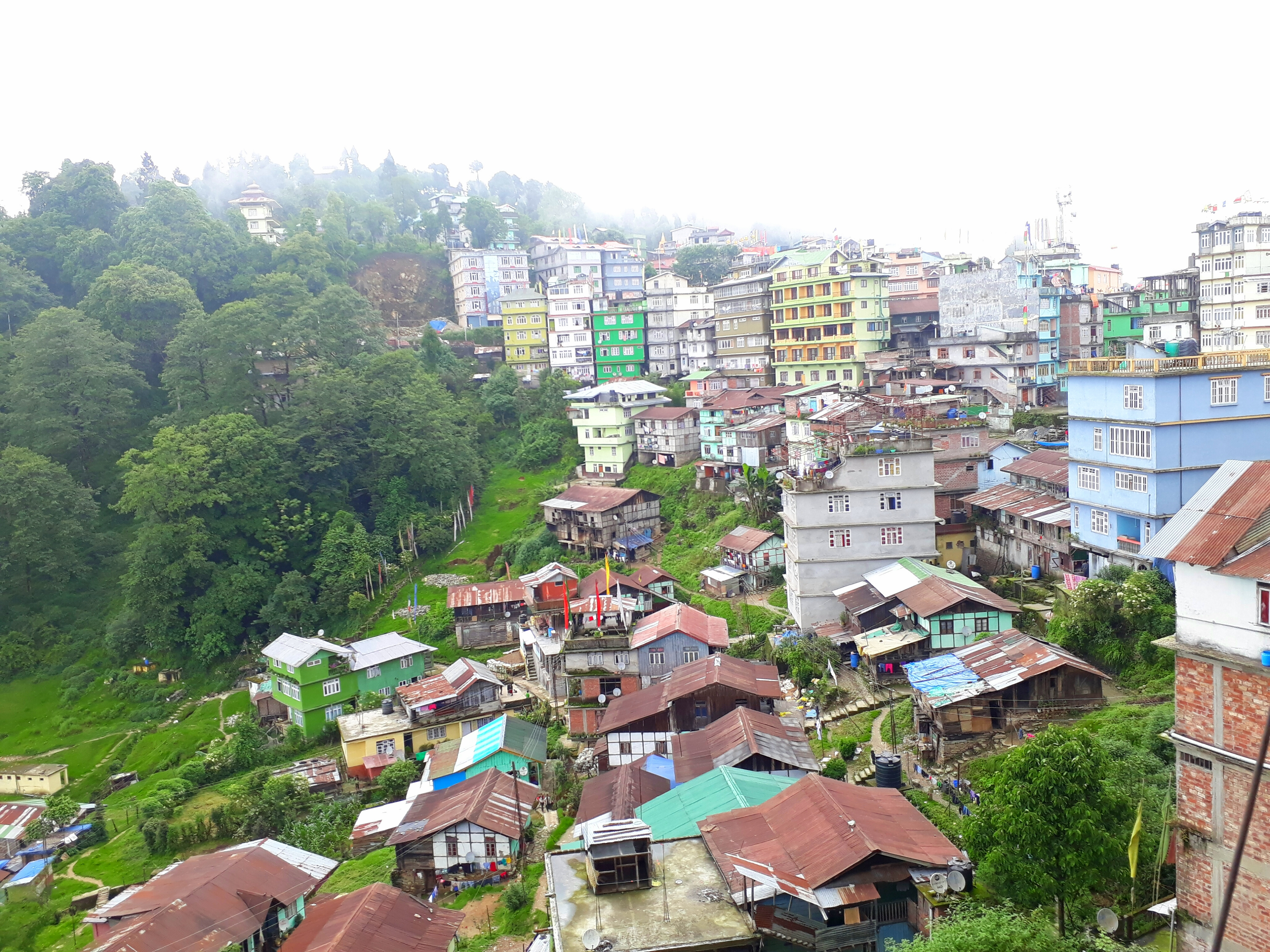
- Ravangla, Namchi District, 737139

- Location in Sikkim, India Ravangla (India)
- Coordinates: 27°17′33″N 88°21′34″E
- Country: India
- State: Sikkim
- District: Namchi

Population (2020)
  - Total: 47,191

Languages
  - Official: Sikkimese, Nepali, Tibetan, Lepcha, Limbu, Newari, Rai, Gurung, Mangar, Sherpa, Tamang and Sunwar
- Time zone: UTC+5:30 (IST)
- Vehicle registration: SK

Rabong or Ravangla is a small town with an elevation of 8000 feet located, near Namchi City in the Namchi district of the Indian state of Sikkim. It is connected by state highway to other major towns in the state and lies between Namchi, Pelling and Gangtok. It is the starting point for the trek to Maenam Wildlife Sanctuary. It is approximately 61 km from the state capital, Gangtok, and 120 km from Siliguri, West Bengal. The name is derived from the Sikkimese language. ‘Ra’ means wild sheep, 'vong' translates to a rearing place, and ‘la’ means a pass.

== Geography ==
Mt. Kanchenjunga, Mt. Pandim, Mt. Siniolchu, Mt. Kabru are some of the major peaks visible from Ravangla.

== Flora ==
The upper parts of Ravangla sometimes experience snowfall during winters. During the months of April–May, the area is surrounded by many flowers including orchids and rhododendrons.

== Fauna ==
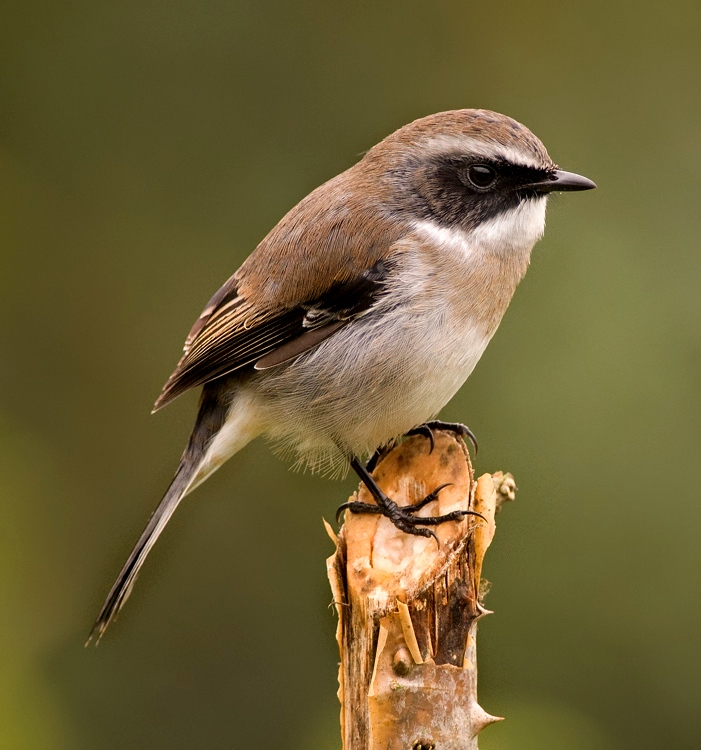
Grey bushchat at Ravangla Sikkim

Ravangla attracts many Himalayan birds. Verditer flycatchers, blue-fronted redstarts, grey bush chats, dark-throated thrush, blue whistling-thrush, green-backed tits, and white-browed fantails are common.The forests around Ravangla have other birds like laughing thrushes, babblers, cuckoos, and hill partridges. The rare satyr tragopan can also be spotted in Ravangla.

== Administrative History ==
Currently, Sikkim has six administrative districts set up to strengthen governance and administration. However, before 1963, the state of Sikkim was divided into two administrative zone, before the merger with India, which was known as East Zone and West Zone. Each of these two zones was under the control of Revenue Officer appointed by the Chogyal (the then King) of Sikkim. Justice in the zones was in the hands of the tribal authorities, for example, Zonepal at the district Zone level, Yaplas Feudal Landlord, Pipon (head men), and Mandal Head etc. The Yaplas used to collet land revenue and deposit it in the state Khazana, most of the revenues was collected in the form harvest goods like grains, agriculture and so on. District, as a concept, was applied for the first time in Sikkim in the year of 1963. Hence, the East and West zone was bifurcated into North District, East District, West District and South District. The South District, in which Ravangla is a subdivision, came into being only in April 1963 and Mr. R.B. Mukhia was appointed as first District Officer of the South District. Sikkim merged with India on May 15, 1975, through referendum, the 36th Amendment Act officially recognized Sikkim as the 22nd state of the India Union. After the merger District Collector was designated as District Magistrate and was given powers conferred with powers mentioned in criminal procedures of 1898. The first Collector and District Magistrate of the South District was Mr. Mingma Tshering.

Recent changes in the administrative setup: The Sikkim (re-Organization of District) Act, 2021, enforced from 21st December 2021, added two new districts- Soreng and Pakyong, by carving out West and East districts, to further strengthen the governance and administration. This step was addressed due to the growing population over the years which made the previous administrative set up challenging to deliver smooth functioning of the administration, specifically the public services sectors such as emergency response, disaster management, law and order, doorstep governance and the like.

== Tibetan community ==
A Tibetan community is located 1 km away from the Ravangla Market. It consists of seven camps, with 328.5 acres of total land and 1,300 people. The Tibetan settlement has one primary Tibetan medium school, two monasteries, administrative offices, and a primary health care clinic. Ralang Monastery, a Buddhist monastery of the Kagyu school of Tibetan Buddhism is located 6 km from Ravangla. The old monastery is also a few kilometers from Borong. There are many small hamlets where these communities live. Tourism is a major source of income for these communities.

== Education ==
NIT Sikkim has a temporary campus in the town.

== Gallery ==
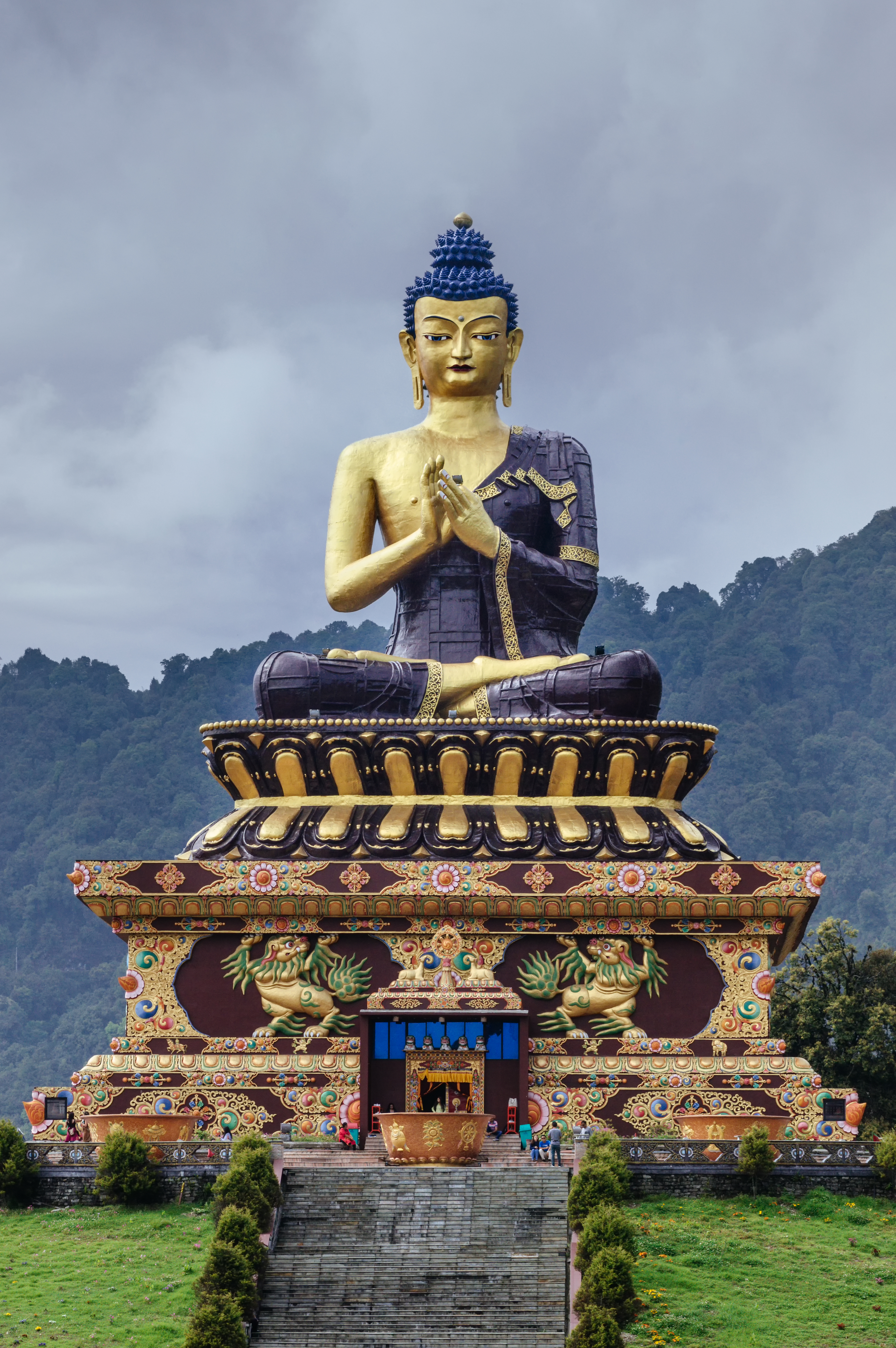
Large Gautama Buddha statue in Buddha Park of Ravangla, Sikkim

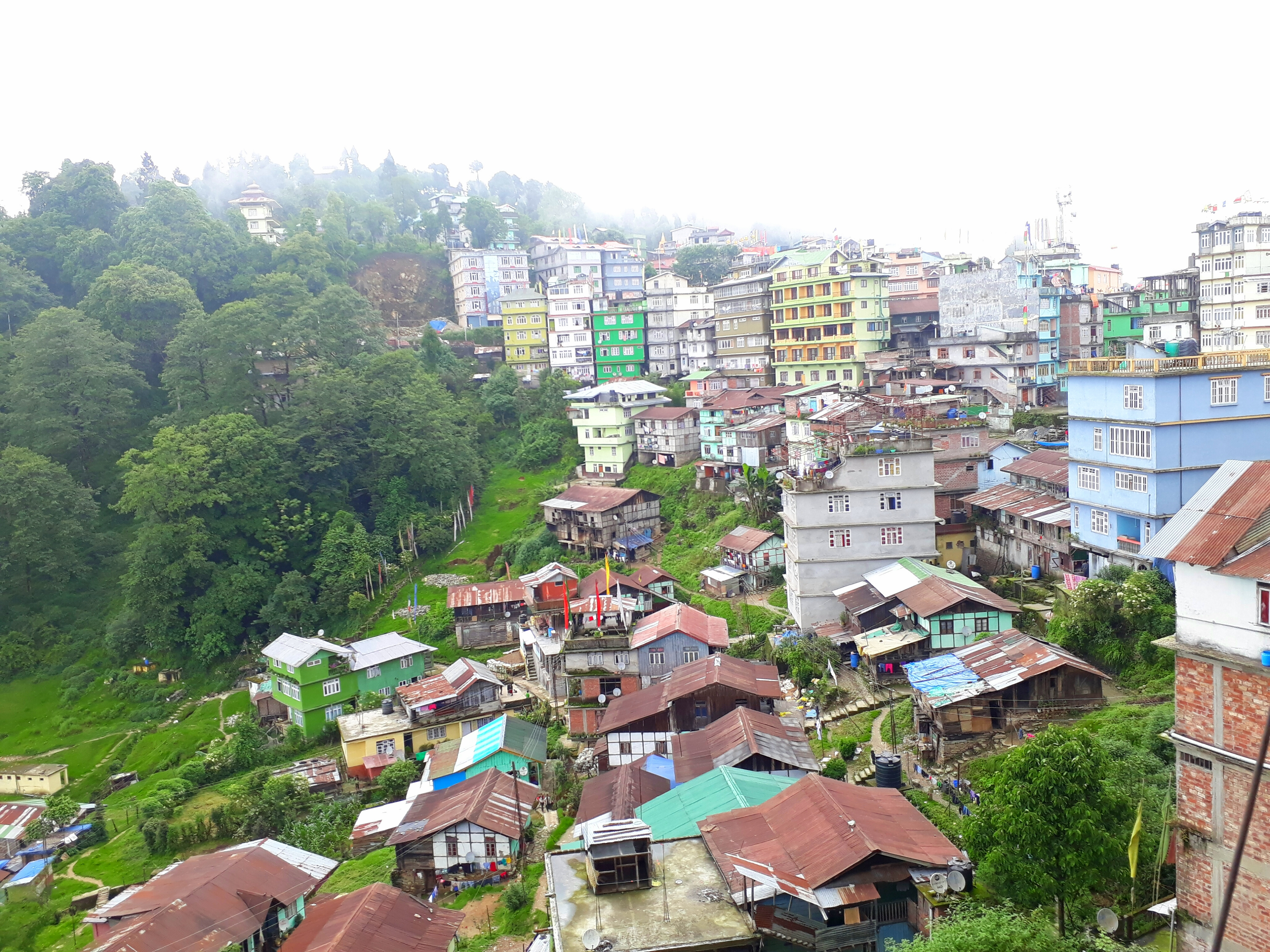
View of Ravangla town

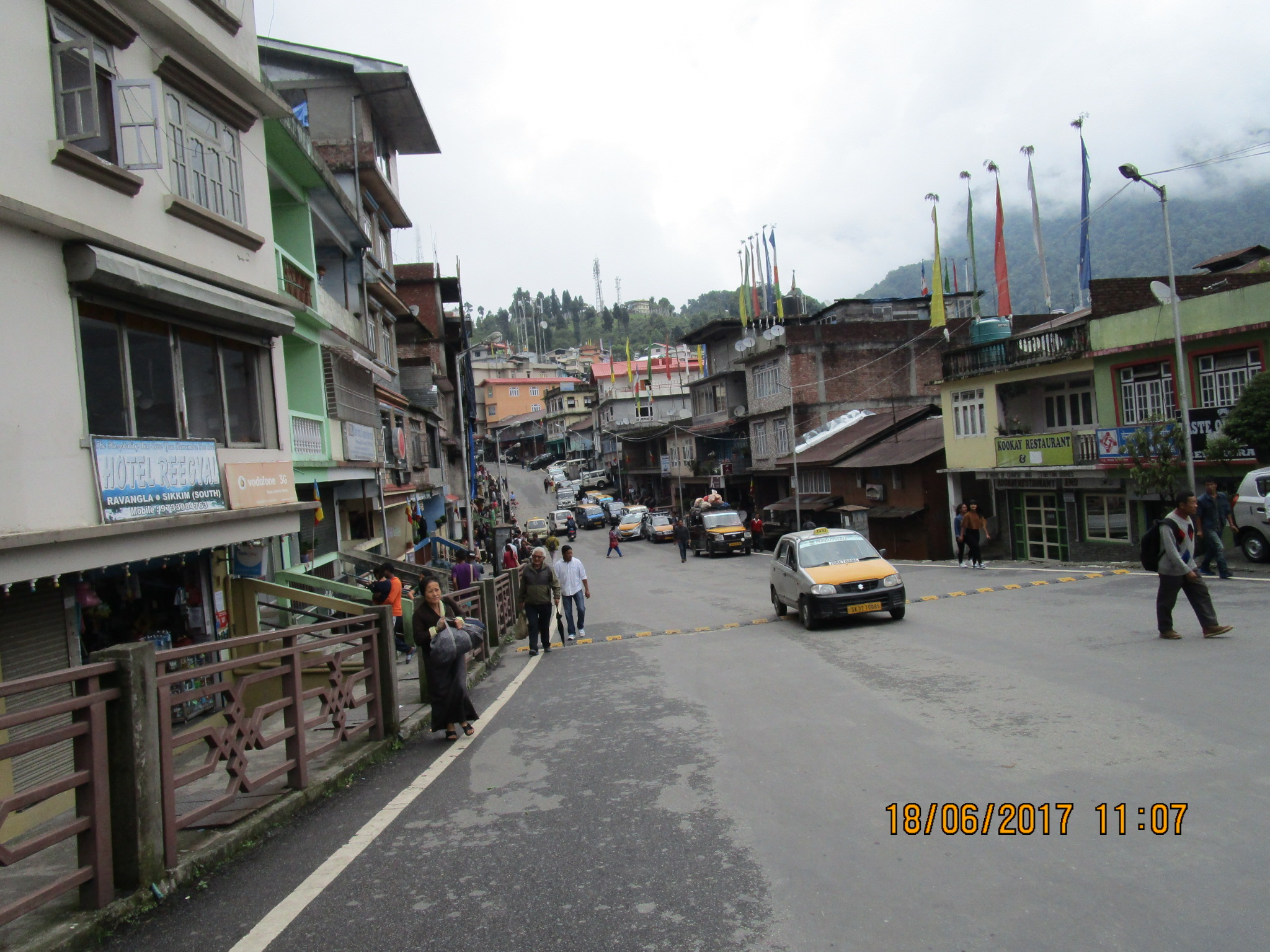
Ravangla main street

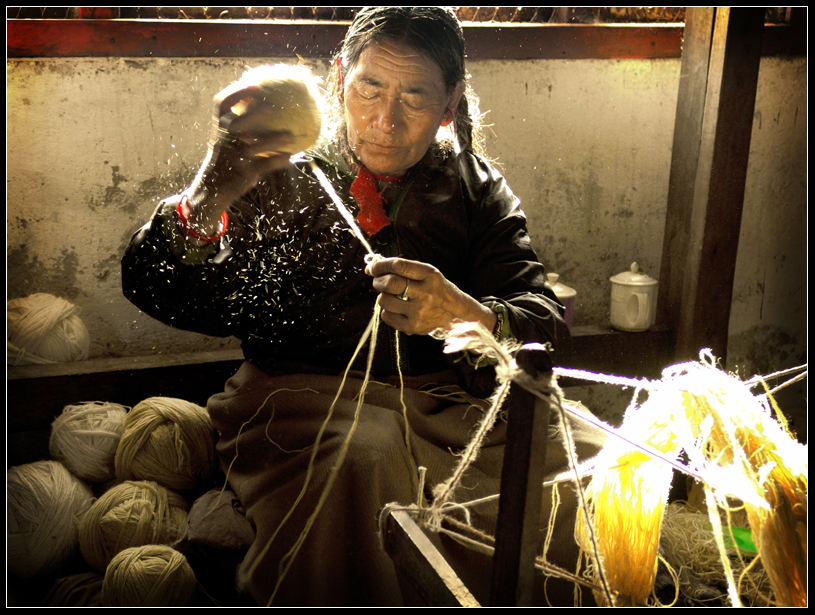
Tibetan Carpet Factory of Ravangla, Sikkim

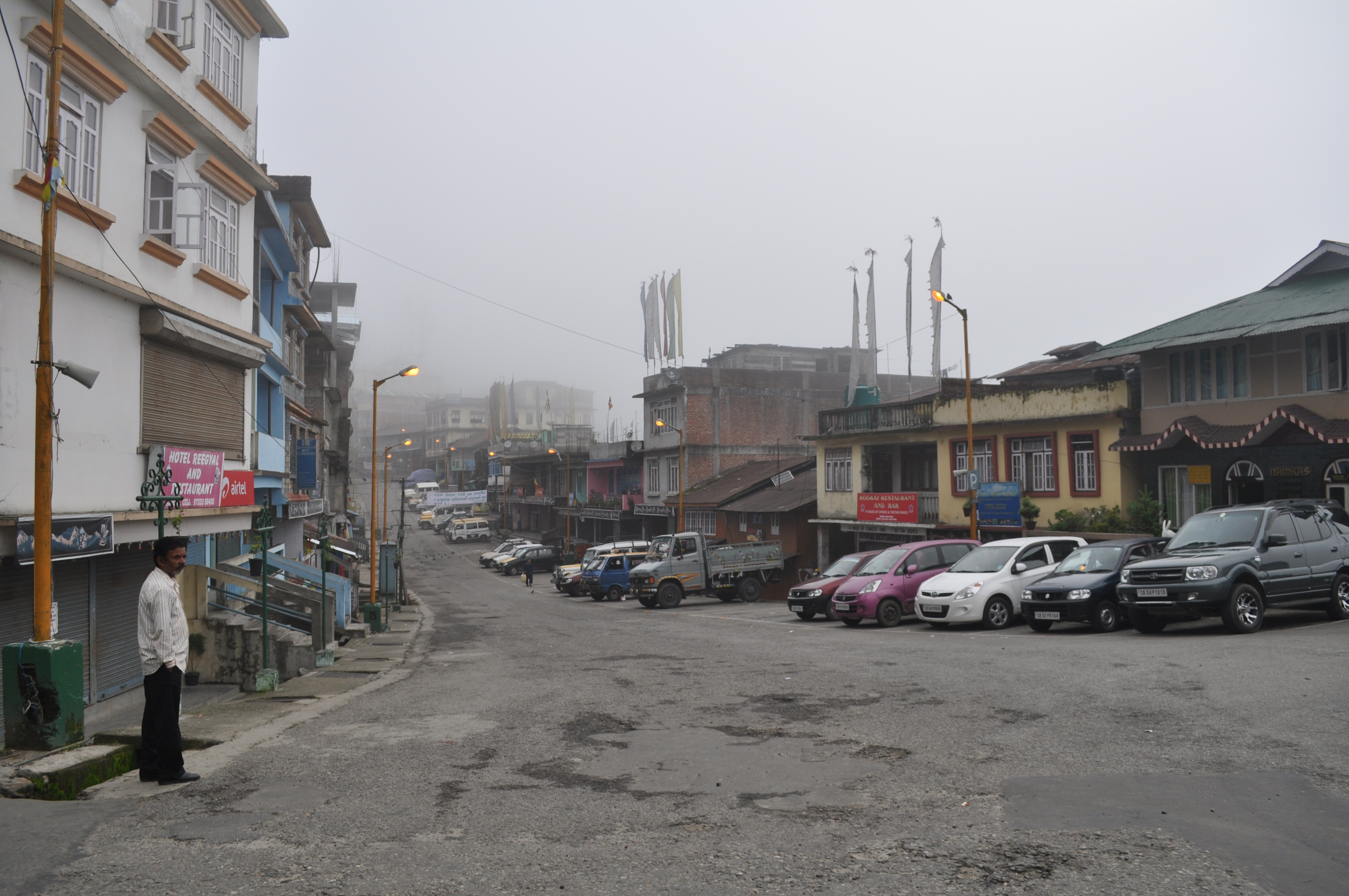
View of the hotels and the Jeep stand

== See also ==
- Chidam
- Damthang, Sikkim
