= Goecha La =

Mountain pass in India

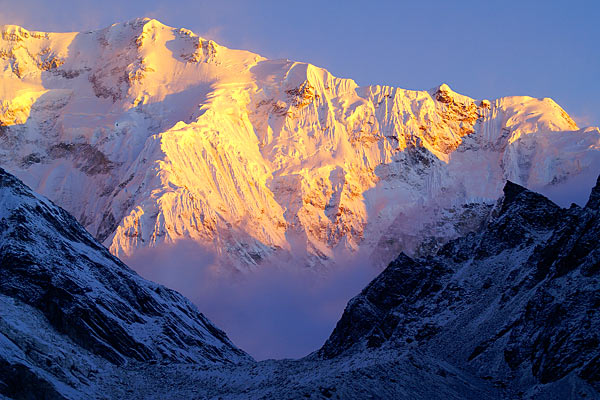
- View of Goecha La under Zemu Gap Peak

- Location within Sikkim
- Elevation: 4,940 metres (16,210 ft)

Third Approach
- Location: India
- Range: Himalaya
- Coordinates: 27°36′28″N 88°11′13″E

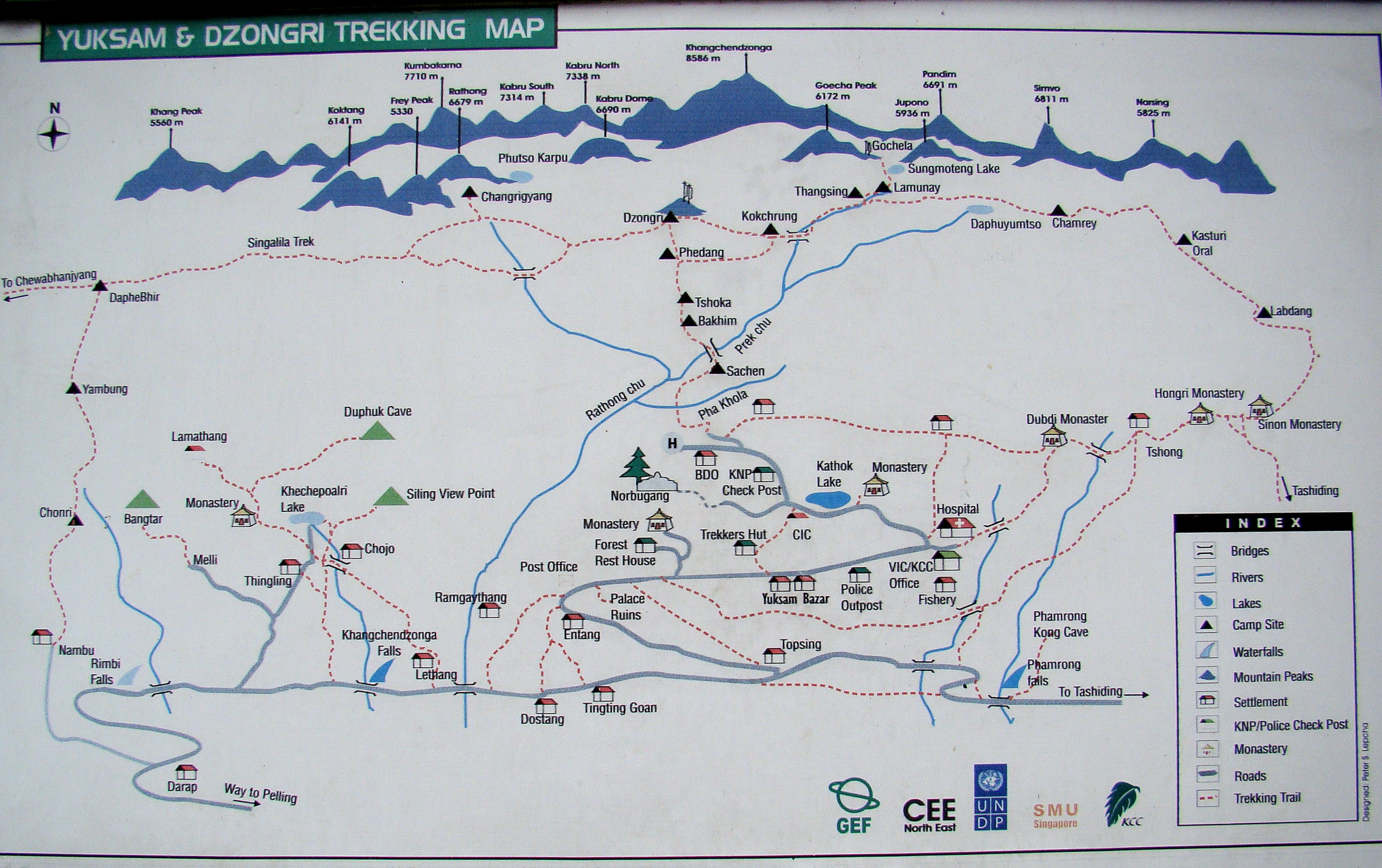
Trekking map at Yuksom with Goecha La Trek

Goecha La (el. 4940 m or 16,207 ft) is a high mountain pass in Gyalshing district, Sikkim, India in the Himalaya range. The southeast face of Kanchenjunga, the world's third highest mountain, can be viewed from the pass, which is also a base camp for those aspiring to scale the mountain. They say that when the government authorities first saw the view from Goecha La, they were so moved by the view that they decided to feature it on the Rs.100 note.

== Trekking ==
Trekking through the Kanchenjunga National Park, in one of the greenest regions in the world, remains one of the top things to do for any holiday maker in the Himalayas. The weather remains clear during the winters and dramatic during the pre-monsoon season, with misty clouds.

The trek itself can be challenging in terms of distances to be covered in a day. Acclimatization is important due to the huge changes in altitude over a small time during this trek.

List of Himalayan peaks seen on Goechala Trek from Dzongri Top, Thangsing and Goechala:

- Kanchenjunga (8586m)
- Talung (7349m)
- Rathong (6679m)
- Kabru N (7353m)
- Koktang (6147m)
- Simvo (6812m)
- Kabru S (7318m)
- Kabru Dome (6600m)
- Kabru Forked (6100m)
- Pandim (6691m)
- Tenchenkhang (6010m)
- Jopuno (5650m)

The basic itinerary:

- Drive from Siliguri to Yuksom
- Yuksom to Sachen (10 km hike)
- Sachen to Tshoka (7 km hike)
- Tshoka to Dzongri (10 km hike)
- Rest and hike to Dzongri La Pass (4417 m)
- Dzongri to Thansing (10 km hike)
- Thansing to Goecha La Pass and back (14 km hike)
- Thansing to Tshoka (16 km hike)
- Tshoka to Yuksom (17 km hike)
- Drive back to Siliguri
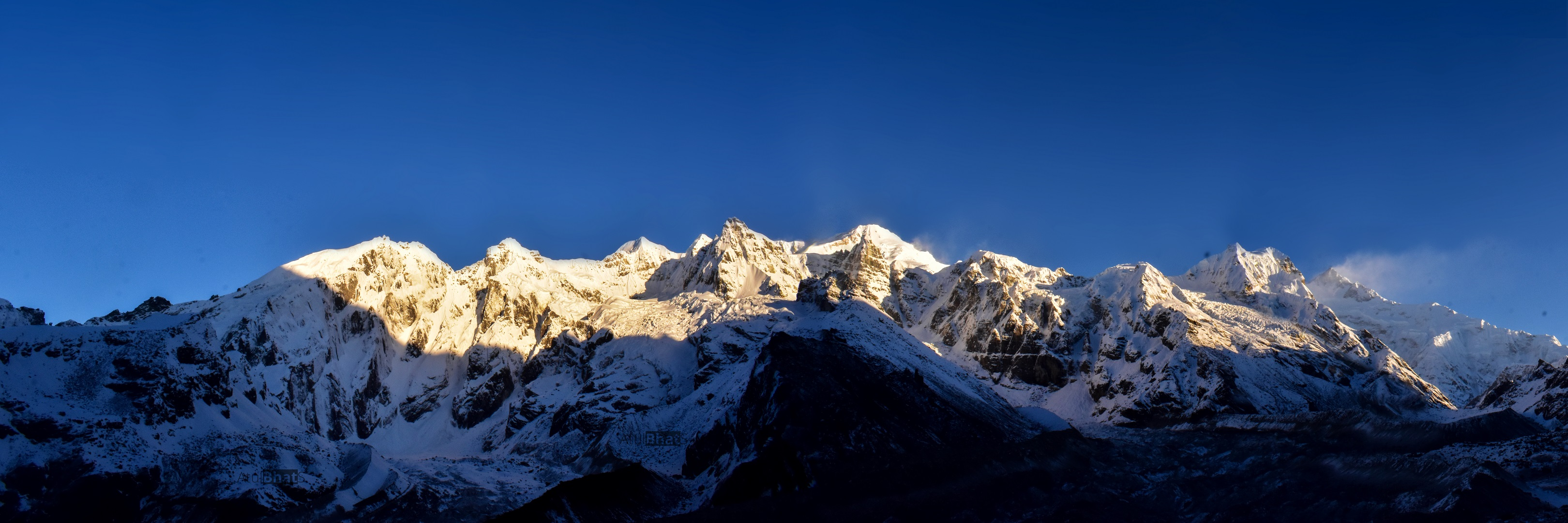
Panoramic view of Kabru (centre) and Goecha La (extreme right). Mt. Kanchenjunga seen above Goecha La with snow blowing off of its summit

For more trekking in sikkim information by local trekking and hiking operators by Glacier Treks And Adventure

== Film ==
- Singalila in the Himalaya http://theindia.info/SingaliLaInTheHimalaya Film on the history of Singalila ridge through a 14-day trek.
- Goecha La: In Search of Kangchenjunga
