= Bhumchu =

Tibetan Buddhist festival

Bumchu
- Official name: Bumchu
- Observed by: Buddhist
- Type: Buddhist
- Date: 22nd day of the ninth lunar month
- Frequency: Once in year

Bhumchu (Bhum is a pot, Chum is water) is a Buddhist festival, which on the Tibetan lunar calendar is held on the 14th and 15th day of the first month, which is between February and March on the Gregorian calendar. In Sikkim the Tashiding Monastery is recognized as a sacred place. It is believed that this place, Dakkar Tashiding in the center of four sacred caves, Sharchog Bephug in the east, Khandozangphu in the south, Dechenphug in the west and Lhari Nyingphug in the north, is meant to free you from the suffering of hell. At the start of the year, the vase is opened and the Lama or monk determines the future. "If the water is to the brim, it foretells a year in which peace and prosperity will prevail. If the water is over the brim and is spilling, it signifies a year with natural disaster and disturbances. If the water level is low or almost dry, it signifies famine." The celebration of "The Holy Water Vase" started under the rule of King Trisong Deutsonin Tibet, Guru Padmasambhava." It is believed that the water overflowed from the vase as a sign of a good omen, and there was an earthquake. The four guardian deities of Dharma and the gods of thirty-three heavens showered flowers from the sky." This ritual is one of the holiest in Sikkim. From midnight until the next day, thousands are seen waiting to receive the holy water. "A part of the holy water is distributed amongst the gathering of devotees and the pot is replenished with river water and sealed at the end of the festival to be opened only during the next Bumchu festival." It is said that by taking a drop of the Bumchu water, enlightenment is achieved and all of the evil spirits and distress are removed. It is said one would somehow attain a form of Buddhahood or be born at a higher ranking in the next life.

A Brief History of Bumchu Rimpochi amongst the four patron saint of Sikkim, Nga-Dag Sempachenpo Phuntshok Rigzin was a pure descendant of 38th king of Tibet (Chogyal Dhri-Sung Deutsen) born from father Tashi Thitsen and mother Lha-Chig Sonam Dolma in the fifth day of forth month of 10th Rabjung Water Male Dragon year (1592 A.D). After excelling the Sutra, Mantra and Philosophical knowledge of Buddha Dharma from his grandfather Ngadak Takshamchen and many other teachers, he sat on strict meditation in Essence-extraction for twelve years with simply ordinary clothes on and gained the siddhi of highest form. Once, after his completion of one hundred thousand prostrations (Kyang-chag) in Lhasa (The present capital of Tibet) he prayed Jho of Lhasa and Avaloketesharaya (Chenrezi) where miraculous rays were shined from the heart of Avaloketesharaya towards his own. This sign of utter auspiciousness was witnessed by his escorts and many other followers. As per the prophecy made by the guru Padmasambhava in eight century A.D, he (Ngadag-Sampa-Chenpo) took an oath to open a holy land of Bayul Dremazong, establish a Monastery and start a chanting session of hundred million mantra of Avaloketesharaya (Mani) and in the year 1642 (12th Rabjung, Water Horse year) he came to bayul Dremazong. At the age of 56 (1646 A.D), Ngadag-Sempa-Chenpo, conducted the first hundred million recitation of Mani Mantra and the Dopchod of Tsasum-Thuje-Chenpo-Khorwa-Le-Drol of Terton (treasure revealer) Shigpo-Lingpa (1524–1583) at Lhakang Marpo at Yuksam which was also the first monastic centre he had established after arriving in Bayul Dremazong. Second recitation of hundred million Mani Mantra was conducted at Salam Rinchenphong in Tibet followed by the third recitation of similar numbers at Peytoe Karma Dolzom (a place in Tibet) and finally the fourth and fifth session of mani recitation of hundred million conducted at Tashiding where numerous sign of auspiciousness such as non-decaying, non-drying and fragrant smell aroused from the Bhumchu. This significant sign of auspiciousness convinced him as a direct blessing of Avaloketesharaya. From there itself, the continuous session of puja of Thuji-Chenpo-Khorwa-Le-Drol taking place at Tashiding from the eight day of first month of Lunar Calendar to the fifteen day of first Month of Lunar Calendar. Since then its last and final session of mani mantra recitation at Drakar Tashiding, this has been the 374 years of holy Bumchu ceremony being held till date i.e. 8-9-03-2020. On the morning of fifteen day of first month of Lunar Calendar, the distribution of Holy Water and the audience of Holy Vase are being given for the devotees without any interruption so far. With the raise of extra cup of holy water in the year 2015 in front of the monks and the government representative present, the doubts and the speculation regarding the sanctity of the holy Bhumchu are cleared once again. Lastly. the Holy Bhumchu which is the direct blessing of Avaloketesharaya (The Buddha of Compassion) and we all the human being from all over the Bayul Dremazong and elsewhere in the world that are fortunate enough to receive is all because of the holy deeds made by the great saint Ngadag-Sampa-Chenpo-Phuntsok-Rigzing. Tashidelek!!

Published and distributed by Tashiding Gumpa Duche.
