= Maenam Wildlife Sanctuary =

Wildlife reserve in Sikkim, India

- IUCN category IV (habitat/species management area)
- Location within Sikkim Location within India
- Interactive map of Maenam Wildlife Sanctuary
- Location: Ravangla, Namchi district, Sikkim, India
- Nearest city: Namchi City
- Coordinates: 27.338032°N 88.385591°E
- Area: 36.34 km^{2} (14.03 sq mi)
- Established: 1969
- Governing body: Government of India, Government of Sikkim

Maenam Wildlife Sanctuary is a wildlife reserve located in Ravangla, near Namchi City in the Namchi district of the Indian state of Sikkim covering an area of around 35 square kilometres (14 sq mi). The literal meaning of maenam-la is "treasure-house of medicines", and the flora of the sanctuary is rich in a number of plants of medicinal value. Established in 1987, Maenam wildlife sanctuary lies 34 kilometres (21 mi) from Namchi City, the district headquarter, 65 kilometres (40 mi) southwest of the state capital Gangtok and is a popular tourist destination.

== Skywalk ==
The first wildlife skywalk in India will be constructed at Maenam Wildlife Sanctuary. The state government of Sikkim proposed construction of the 22 kilometres (14 mi) rope-way from Maenam Wildlife Sanctuary to a skywalk which will be built over the edge of the Bhalleydhunga steep face. There will be a rain shelter and public conveniences at the skywalk. The environment ministry has also approved the proposal, which will cost 5 billion Rupees.

== See also ==
- Wildlife sanctuaries of India
