= Melli Dara =

Village in India

Coordinates: 27.1028°N 88.4282°E

Melli Dara is a village in the Namchi district of the Indian State of Sikkim about 75 kilometres (47 mi) from the state capital Gangtok and about 11 kilometres (6.8 mi) north of Melli. The total area of the village is 13.5 square kilometres (5.2 sq mi) and it has a total population of 6,333. The village comes under 12-Melli constituency of the Sikkim Legislative Assembly and under 22-Melli Dara Paiyong Gram Panchayat Unit.

== Cyber village ==
Melli Dara is known for various innovative initiatives undertaken in the field of e-Governance at grassroots level. Computerization of the village administration centre, implementation of a single windows system at village level, solid waste management system, Panchayat Sandesh (Monthly news paper published by GPU), Free SMS updates for GPU activities etc. are various initiatives taken by the GPU. The GPU received 'Rashtriya Gaurav Gram Sabha Purashkar - 2011' from Government of India. Apart from this, the panchayat unit have received several state level awards. Recently 'The Information Technology person of the year' title was awarded to the President of GPU, Mr. Ganesh Kumar Rai, in Sikitex 2011.

India's first cyber village has been set up at Melli Dara Paiyong in South Sikkim. Governor Shriniwas Patil on 2 October 2013 launched the cyber village project implemented by Information Technology Department, Government of Sikkim.

The cyber village software at Melli Dara Paiyong Gram Panchayat Unit is web-based and allows gathering of information from grassroots level using handheld devices and integrating it with the departmental database on a real time basis. Each of the six ward panchayat is provided with the handheld devices to collect and update data of the villagers. Each resident will have his or her exclusive digital profile in the handheld device. Data generated are used for multiple purposes including police verification and monitoring of benefits provided by the government to the villagers. The data are generated and verified by the concerned ward panchayat. SMS based services have been adopted in the project wherein a registered villager can benefit without being present in the offices physically. The software has been developed with active participation of member of Melli Dara Paiyong GPU.

As per the project, the Information Technology Department will be providing computer literacy to the villagers of Melli Dara Paiyong. School going children will also be educated on cyber security. "The State government has embarked on the process of taking our villages to the next stage, i.e. cyber village. This will uproot the very notion of ‘digital divide’ from Sikkim forever," says Melli Dara Paiyong GPU president D.B. Pradhan.
