= Chidam =

- town
- Location in Sikkim, India Chidam (India)
- Coordinates: 27.12°N 88.45°E
- Country: India
- State: Sikkim
- District: Namchi
- Elevation: 819 m (2,687 ft)

Languages
  - Official: Nepali, Bhutia, Lepcha, Limbu, Newari, Rai, Gurung, Mangar, Sherpa, Tamang and Sunwar
- Time zone: UTC+5:30 (IST)
- Vehicle registration: SK

Chidam is a small town in the Namchi district of the Indian state of Sikkim.

== Geography ==
Chidam is located at 27.12°N 88.45°E. It has an average elevation of 819 metres (2,687 feet).
