= Perbing =

Village in Sikkim state, India

Coordinates: 27.1769°N 88.4064°E

Perbing is a village near Namchi in the Namchi district of Sikkim state, India, some 90 kilometres (56 mi) from the state capital Gangtok. The village is demographically dominated by the Sherpa tribe of Sikkim.

The village comes under the 14 Perbing-Dovan gram panchayat unit (local administrative unit) and is under the 13 Namthang-Rateypani Constituency.
