= Damthang, Sikkim =

Damthang
- town
- Location in Sikkim, India Damthang (India)
- Coordinates: 27.23°N 88.40°E
- Country: India
- State: Sikkim
- District: Namchi
- Elevation: 1,852 m (6,076 ft)

Languages
  - Official: Nepali, Bhutia, Lepcha, Limbu, Newari, Rai, Gurung, Mangar, Sherpa, Tamang and Sunwar
- Time zone: UTC+5:30 (IST)
- Vehicle registration: SK

Damthang is a small town in the Namchi district of the Indian state of Sikkim.

== Geography ==
Damthang is located at 27.23°N 88.40°E. It has an average elevation of 1,852 metres (6,076 feet).

According to Census 2011 information the location code or village code of Damthang village is 261109. Damthang village is located in Namchi subdivision of South District district in Sikkim, India. It is situated 13km away from Namchi, which is both district & sub-district headquarter of Damthang village. As per 2009 stats, Damthang village is also a gram panchayat.

The total geographical area of village is 292.77 hectares. Damthang has a total population of 608 peoples, out of which male population is 331 while female population is 277. Literacy rate of damthang village is 74.34% out of which 75.83% males and 72.56% females are literate. There are about 126 houses in damthang village. Pincode of damthang village locality is 737126.

When it comes to administration, Damthang village is administrated by a sarpanch who is elected representative of the village by the local elections. As per 2019 stats, Damthang village comes under Poklok-kamrang assembly constituency & Sikkim parliamentary constituency. Namchi is nearest town to damthang for all major economic activities, which is approximately 13km away.
