= Tashiding Monastery =

Buddhist monastery in West Sikkim, India

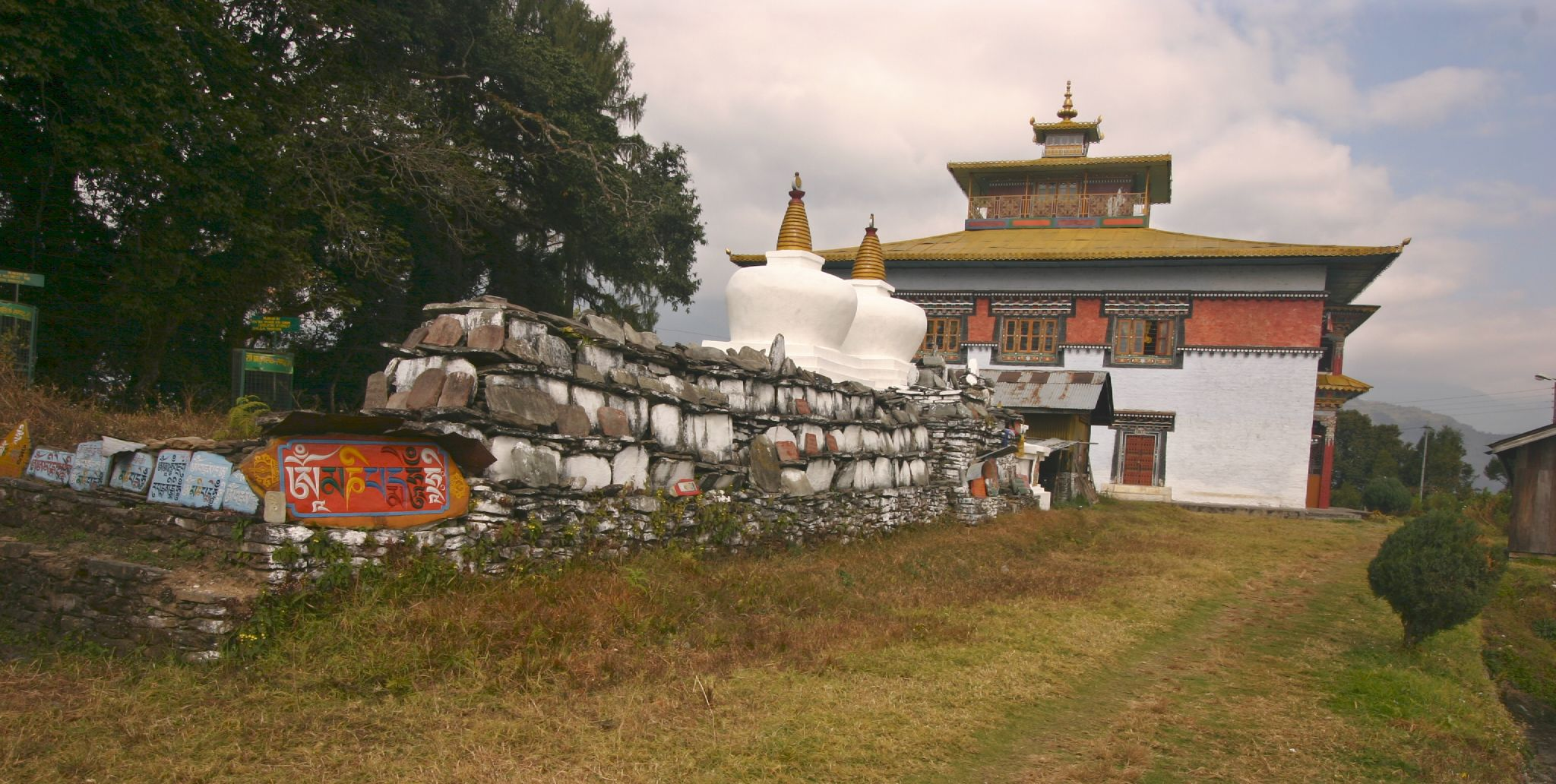
- Tashiding Monastery with Mani stone slabs at the entry

- Location within India

Religion
- Affiliation: Tibetan Buddhism
- Sect: Nyingma
- Deity: Guru Padmasambhava
- Festival: Bumchu Festival – 14-15th of first month in Tibetan Calendar

Location
- Location: Tashiding, Gyalshing district, Sikkim, India
- Country: India
- Interactive map of Tashiding Monastery
- Coordinates: 27°18′30″N 88°17′53″E

Architecture
- Founder: Guru Padmasambhava. Built by Ngadak Sempa Chenpo
- Completed: 1717; 309 years ago

Tashiding Monastery (Sikkimese: བཀྲ་ཤིས་སྡིངས་དགོན་པ་, Wylie: bkra shis sdings dgon pa) is a Buddhist monastery of the Nyingma sect of Tibetan Buddhism in Tashiding, about 27 km from Gyalshing city in Gyalshing district in northeastern Indian state of Sikkim. which is the most sacred and holiest monasteries in Sikkim. It is described as the "Heart of Sikkim/Denzong", citing to its importance of religious sacredness. It is located on top of the hill rising between the Rathong chu and the Rangeet River, 40 kilometres (25 mi) from Gyalshing and 19 kilometres (12 mi) to the south east of Yuksam. The annual festival of Bumchu, meaning ~Holy water~ takes place on the 14th and 15th of the 1st month of Tibetan lunar calendar, often around the months of February and March. The festival is believed to predict the upcoming forecasts and events for Sikkim in the coming year. Undoubtedly, one of the most important and holiest festivals for all the Buddhists in Sikkim and around, it also provides for a perfect platform for all those Non-Buddhists who seek a deeper insight into Buddhism and its religious customs, beliefs and rituals. History of the Festival- Somewhere between 755 and 804 CE in Tibet under the reign of King Trisong Deutsen. It was under his rule that Guru Padmasambhava when invited to Tibet performed a holy sadhana and consecrated the land with water from his SACRED VASE, which was then later concealed as a hidden treasure in his most blessed place, the Tashiding Monastery in Sikkim. Somewhere around 17th century, the vase was again discovered by one of the reincarnations of Padmasambhava and it is since that time, this festival again resumed with all its glory and splendour in the hidden and blessed land of Sikkim/Beyul Demozong. Tashiding is the nearest town to the Tashiding Monastery (Gompa)

Tashiding means "The Devoted Central Glory" and the monastery by this name was founded in 1641 by Ngadak Sempa Chempo Phunshok Rigzing who belonged to the Nyingma sect of Tibetan Buddhism. Ngadak was one of the three wise men who held the consecration ceremony crowning the first King of Sikkim at Yuksom. It was extended and renovated in 1717 during the reign of the third Chogyal Chakdor Namgyal. 'Bhumchu Ceremony' or festival is a popular religious festival that is held on the 14th and 15th day of the first month of Tibetan Calendar.

The Tashiding Monastery is part of Buddhist religious pilgrimage circuit starting with the first monastery at Yuksam in Sikkim known as the Dubdi Monastery, Norbugang Chorten, Pemayangtse Monastery, the Rabdentse ruins, the Sanga Choeling Monastery, and the Khecheopalri Lake.

== Legend ==
There are several legends linked to the most revered monastery and the Bhumchu festival that is held here.

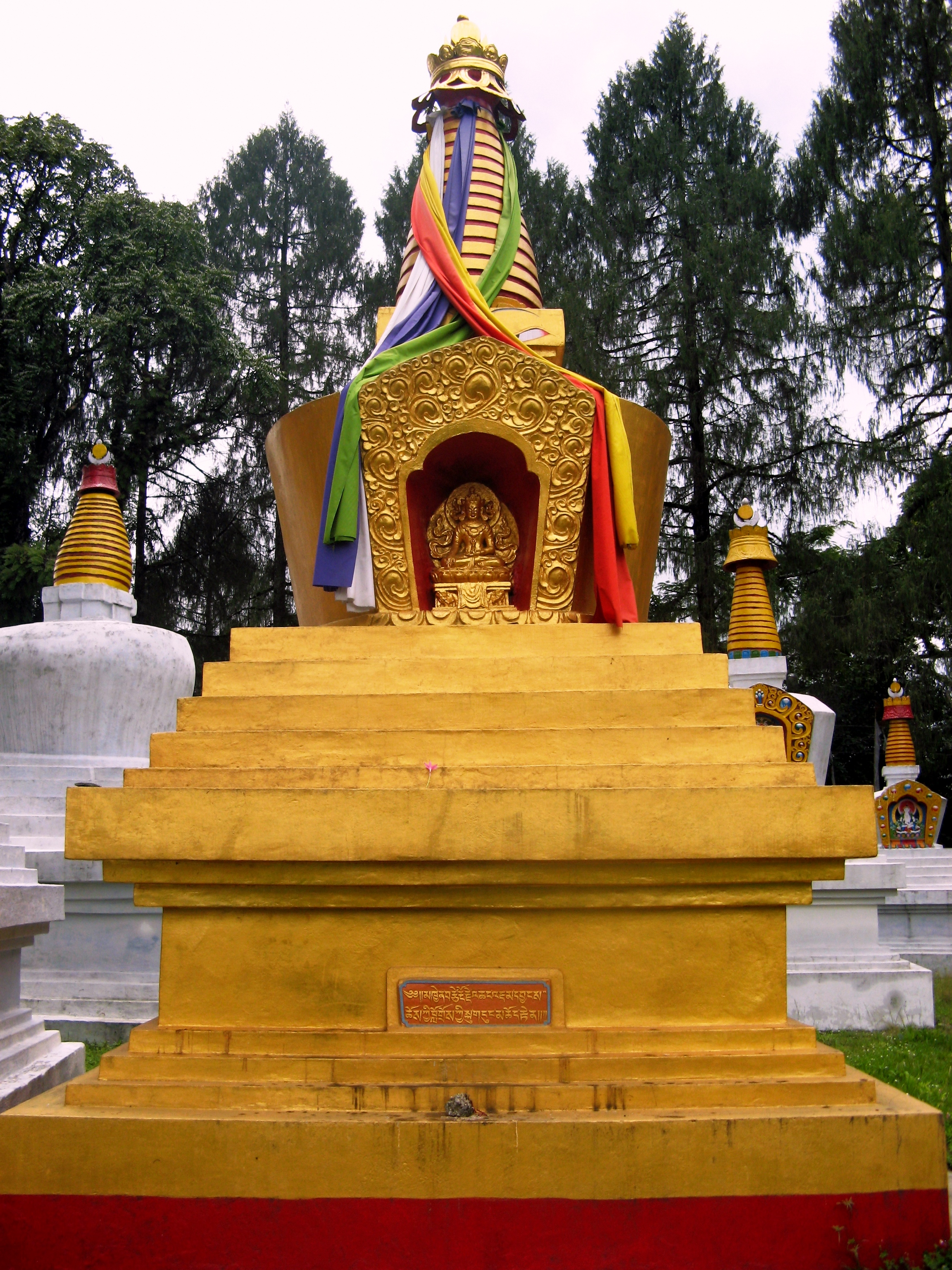
The Golden Chorten near Tashiding Monastery

Another legend relates to the three monks who consecrated the first Chogyal of Sikkim at Yuksam. It is said that the three monks saw an unusual divine phenomenon of bright light shining on top of the Kanchendzonga mountain, which reflected to a site near the place where the present Tashiding Monastery has been built. Concurrently, a scented smell of incense followed by all pervading divine music was also noted. The first Chogyal who visited the site subsequent to hearing this unusual event, erected a small chorten at the site and named it as Thongwa-Rang-Grol. Legend further glorifies the site stating that a mere sight of it "confers self-emancipation".

Another absorbing legend is related to the celebration of the Bhumchu festival at Tashiding Monastery. The legend is traced to the tantric art. Guru Padmasambhava, while teaching the tantric system of "Mahakarunika Avalokiteshvara Sadhana and initiation on emancipation from the cycle of mundane existence" to the King Trisong Detsen, prince Murub Tsenpo, Yeshe Tsogyal and Vairotsana in Tibet, sanctified the same holy vase with holy water, which is now kept in Tashiding Monastery and revered during the Bhumchu festival. This vase is made of five types prized jewels, divine soil and holy water said to have been gathered by Padmasambhava from religious centres in India, Oddiyana and Zahor. The vase was made by the wrathful deity Damchen Gar-bgag and sanctified by Guru Padmasambhava himself by performing the "Sadhana of Yidam Chuchig Zhal (meaning tutelary deity of eleven heads)". On this occasion, heavenly deities appeared in the sky and thereafter merged into the holy water contained in the vase. The vase then overflowed and the water dispersed in "all directions in the form of rays." This ritual was immediately followed by an earthquake, which was considered an auspicious sign. The divine moment also witnessed the presence of the four guardian divinities namely, "the Gyalchen Dezhi/Cutur – Maharajika of Dharma and the gods of the thirty-three heavens (Samchu Tsasumgyi Lhanam) who showered flowers from the sky." The event was witnessed by devotees and Padmasmabhava distributed the holy water from the vase to all assembled people, which spiritually benefited one and all. The vase was then hidden as a treasure under the care of the divine deities. However, the vase was rediscovered and passed through the hands of several holy men and finally placed at Tashiding by Terton Ngadak Sempa Chenpo. During the reign of the first ruler of Sikkim, Phuntshog Namgyal, the Terton recited the holy hymn "Om Mani Padme Hum" five billions when several unique events were also witnessed in Sikkim. After the religious ceremony the vase with the water has been kept on display in a small chamber in the Monastery under the custody of the Chogyal himself, which is opened once a year during the Bhumchu festival.

== Geography ==
This monastery located at an altitude of 1465 m is built on top of a heart shaped hill or helmet shaped hill above the confluence of the Rathong Chu and Rangeet rivers, with the Mt. Kanchendzonga providing the scenic back drop. It is about 16 km from Yuksam, 40 km from Gezing via Legship.

The monastery is considered the spiritual centre of Sikkim since it is encircled by many important monasteries in Sikkim in all directions such as: the Dubdi Monastery 23 km away on its northern direction, the Khecheopalri Lake (wish fulfilling lake) on the northwest, the Pemayangtse monastery on the west, the Shiva temple at Legship on the south, the Mongbrue gompa and Ravangla Bön monastery on the southeast, the Ravangla Gelug monastery on the east, the Karma Kagyud Ralang Monastery on the northeast. Gulia summarising the importance of this monastery has said:

For tashiding one can say "seeing is believing." The monastery is historically illustrious, geographically well located, aesthetically beautiful, spiritually divine – a place where nature and spirituality dwell together, urging the human race to be ecologically upright.

Geographically the Monastery and the Tashiding town are surrounded by four divine caves located in four cardinal directions. The four caves where Buddhist saints meditated are: On the East is the Sharchog Bephug, on the South is the Khandozangphu, in the West is Dechenpug cave and on the North is the Lhari Nyingphug. The main deity deified in the monastery is Tashiding and hence the monastery is also known as 'Drakkar Tashiding' (Sikkimese: བྲག་དཀར་བཀྲ་ཤིས་སྡིངས་, Wylie: brag dkar bkra shis sdings).

== History ==
In the 17th century, Ngadak Sempa Chenpo built a small Lhakhang at this location. This was enlarged into the present monastery during the reign of Chogyal Chakdor Namgyal. Pedi Wangmo built the main monastery and installed many statues which are still seen in the monastery. Lhatsun Chenpo built the Chortens; which are considered holy. Yanchong Lodil, the Master craftsman crafted the flagstones that surround the monastery. These are carved with the holy Buddhist mantra 'Om Mane Padme Hum'.

== Architecture ==
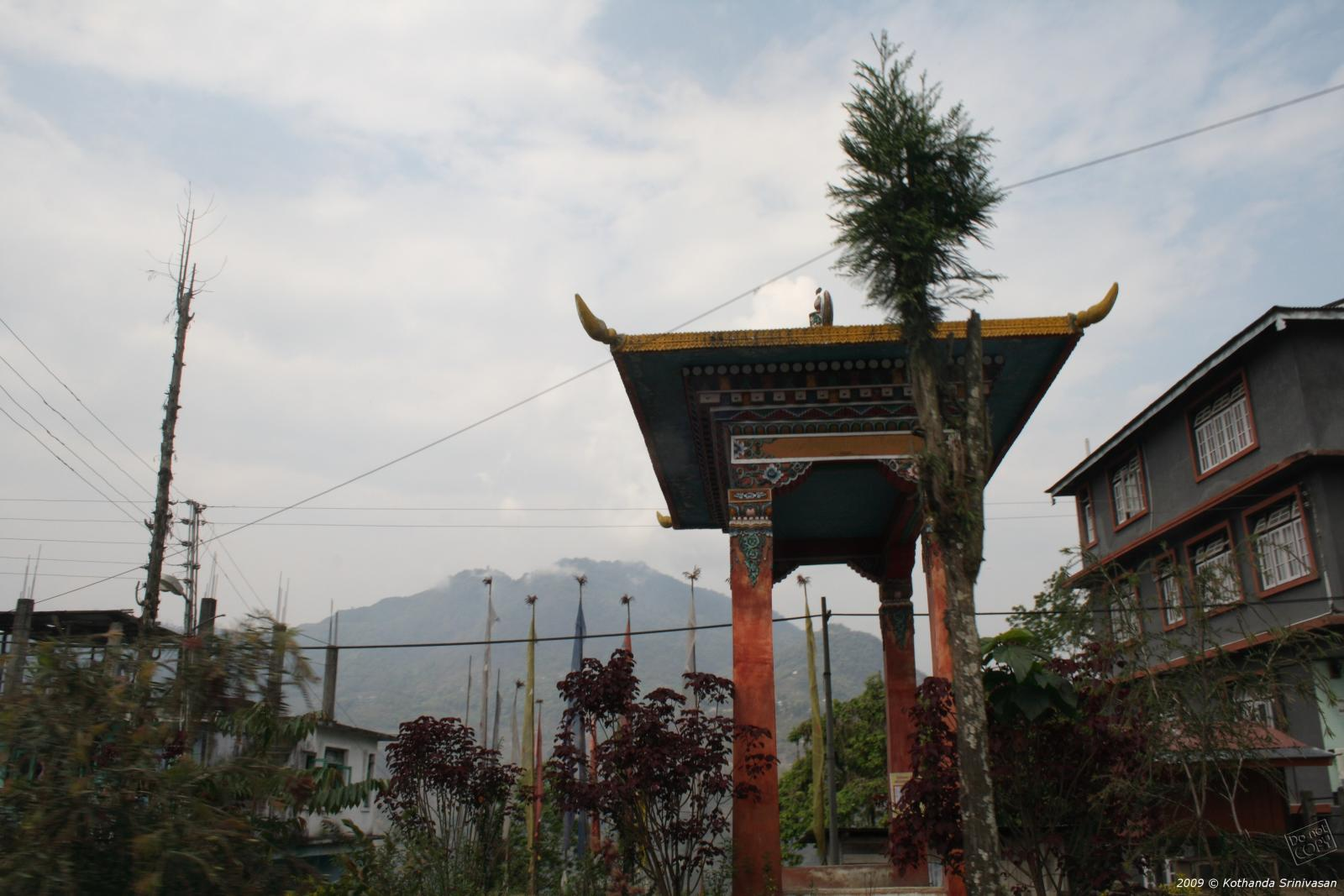
Entrance gate to Tashiding Monastery

An overall picture of the precincts of the monastery within the Tashiding town is provided in five distinct blocks namely, the Sinem market place, the outskirts, the main market place, the main Tashiding Monastery and the Chorten area.

The Sinek market place is located on an incline on the ridge between Rathong Chu and Rangeet River. There is a gompa here called the Sinolochu Gompa from where an approach leads to the Tashiding Monastery on the southern direction. The settlement is spread lengthwise and is 23 kilometres (14 mi) from Yuksom. A large 'Mani' stone is seen at the entrance to this settlement and the Tashiding market.

From the main market centre the approach to the Monastery is through a road, and also a footpath. The footpath in the southern direction has a gentle slope and passes through a Mani and then prayer wind wheels terminating at the entrance gate of the Monastery.

The Monastery itself consists of a 'Mani Lhakang' at the entrance surrounded by flags, and lead to the guest house. From this point ahead is the main 'Tashiding Gompa' which is called as Chogyal Lhakhang or the monastery, followed by the 'butter lamp house', four chortens, 'Tsenkhang', a new butter lamp house and finally terminating at the 'Guru Lhakhang', which is the temple of Guru Rinpoche. Other basic essential structures such as kitchen, school and residential housing are located on the left side of the approach path to the monastery.

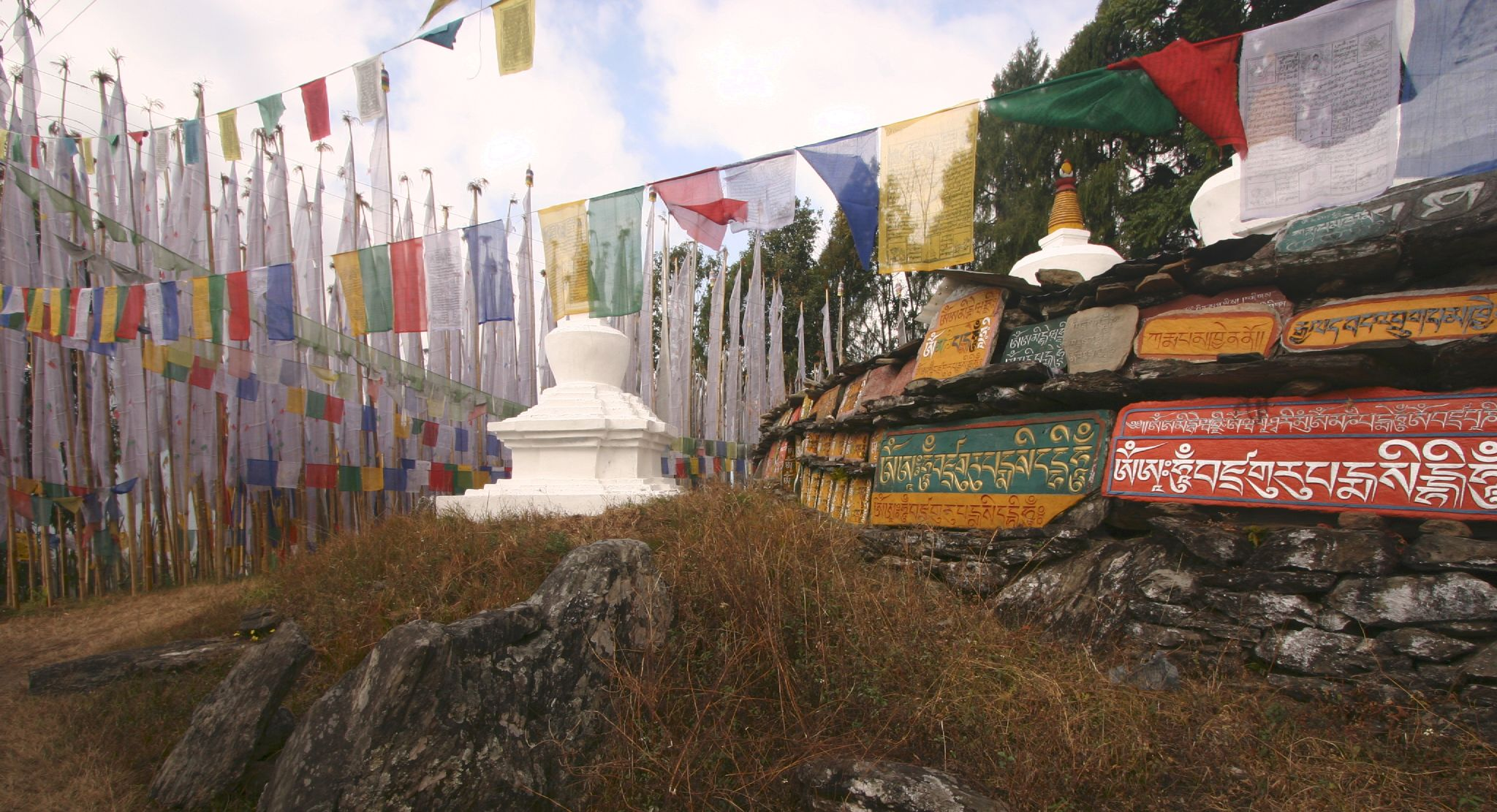
Chorten and inscription slabs outside the Tashiding Monastery.

In the 'Chorten area', there are 41 chortens categorised as 'Chotens of Enlightenment', 'Chortens of Reconciliation' and 'Chortens of Great Miracle', which are all of Rinpoches and Tathāgatas.

However, the main temple has undergone renovation work in modern times and rebuilt, but is still encircled by traditional buildings and chortens at the far end of the site, which holds the relics of Sikkim Chogyals and Lamas, including the 'Thong-Wa-rang-Dol' chorten which is believed to cleanse the soul of any person who looks at it.

Also of major note are the stone plates called the 'Mani', the work of Yanchong Lodil who inscribed them with the sacred Buddhist inscriptions, such as "Om Mane Padme Hum".

== Festivals ==
Bhumchu festival, which is linked by an ancient legend to Guru Padmasambhava, is about a divine vase filled with holy water kept in the monastery, which is opened for public display and worship every year on the night before the Full Moon day in the first month of Tibetan calendar. Bhumchu (Bhum=pot; Chu=water) is a Buddhist festival celebrated to predict the future. In this vase, water of Rathong chhu is stored for a year and kept in the Tashiding Monastery. It is opened during the festival by the lamas who inspect the water level and hence it is called the festival of holy water. The belief is that alteration in the quantity and quality of the water stored in the vase over a year would indicate the fortune of Sikkim and its people in the following year. If it is filled to the brim (which is interpreted as a measure of increase by 21 cups), the following year will be prosperous. If it is empty, famine will follow, and if it is half-filled also a prosperous year is predicted. If the water is polluted with dust it is interpreted as a sign of strife and clash. Once inspected and the Bhumchu festival is concluded, the lamas fill the vase with fresh water from the river and seal it for the opening in the following year.

The procedure followed for taking out the sacred water from the vase is that the first cup of sacred water is taken out for blessing the members of the royal family of the Chogyals, then the second cup is meant for the Lamas and the third cup of water is meant for the devotees to whom it is distributed. Pilgrims come to the monastery from all regions of Sikkim to be blessed with the holy water. The festival is of particular importance to the Bhutias (ethnic Tibetans) of Sikkim who hold the "life-sustaining water of the rivers" with great reverence. The festival falls on the 15th day Full Moon day of the first Tibetan month or Hindu month of Magh corresponding to February/March according to Gregorian calendar.

The basic purpose of the festival is to highlight the importance of water as a precious resource to be conserved and its purity preserved. The prophecy also sends a message to the people that waters should not be polluted and its environmental importance is propagated.

== Gallery ==
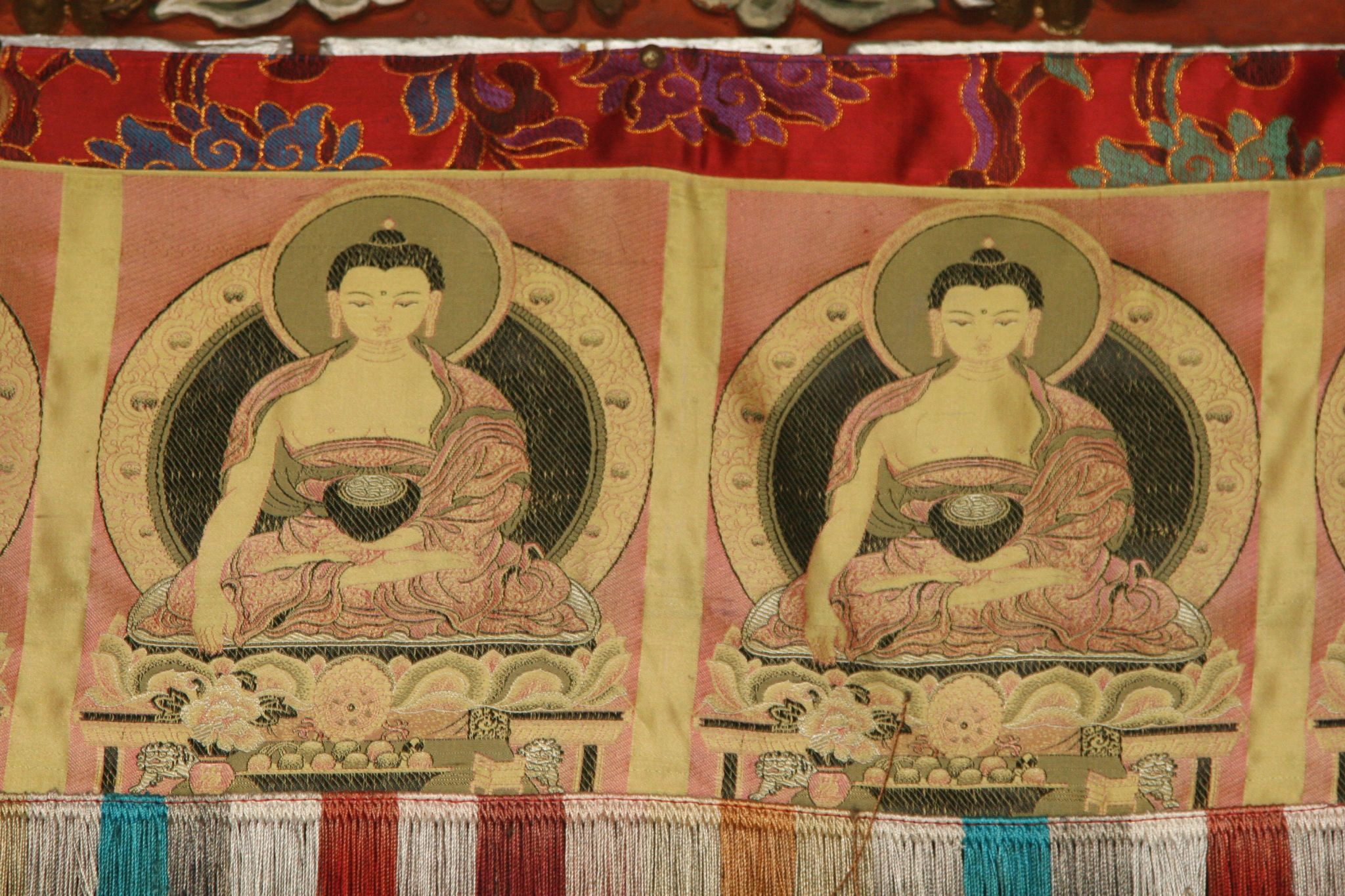
Scroll painting of Buddha seen in the Monastery

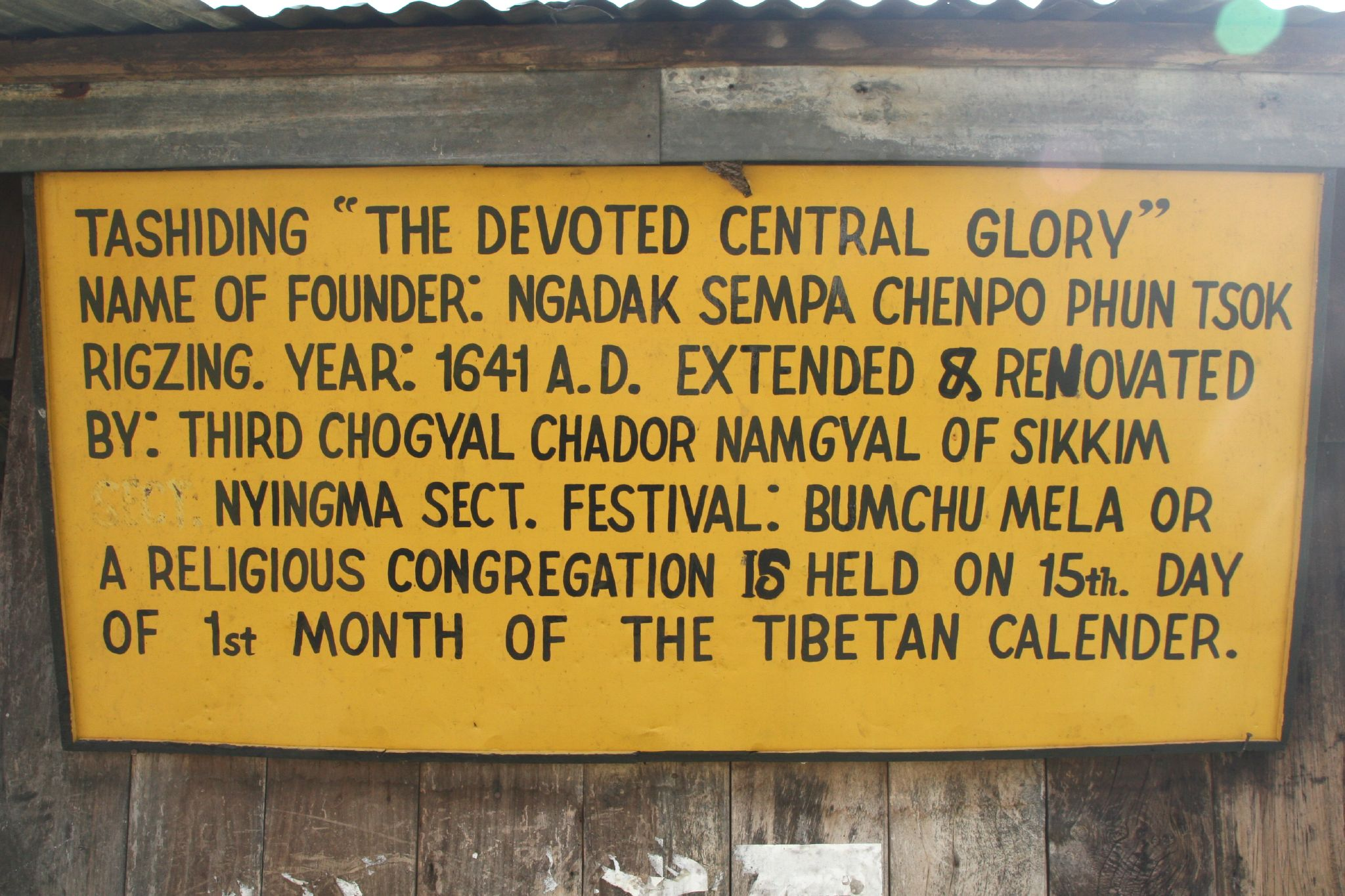
A plaque at the entrance to the Tashiding Monastery

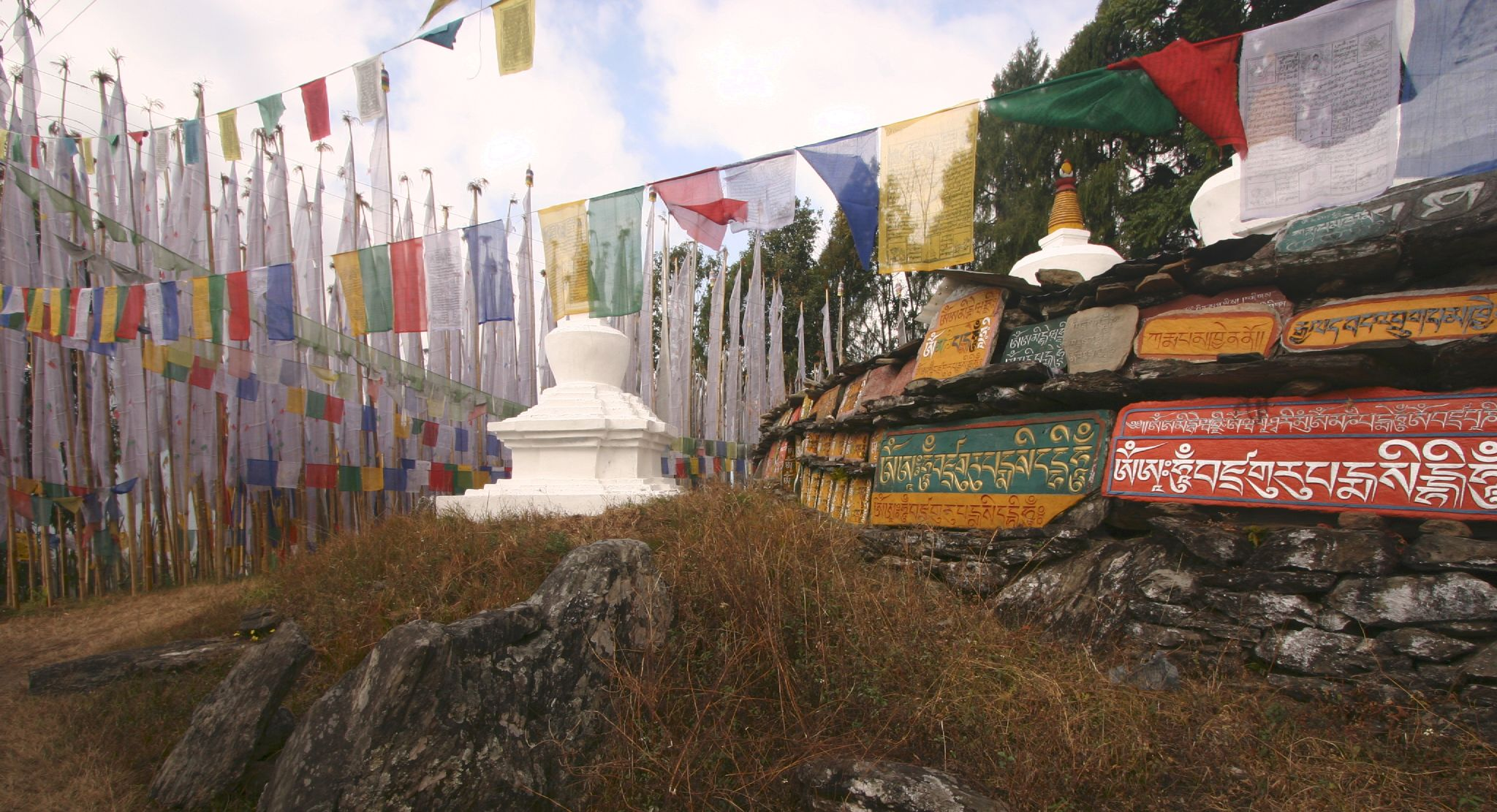
Chortens and inscription stones outside the Tashiding Monastery

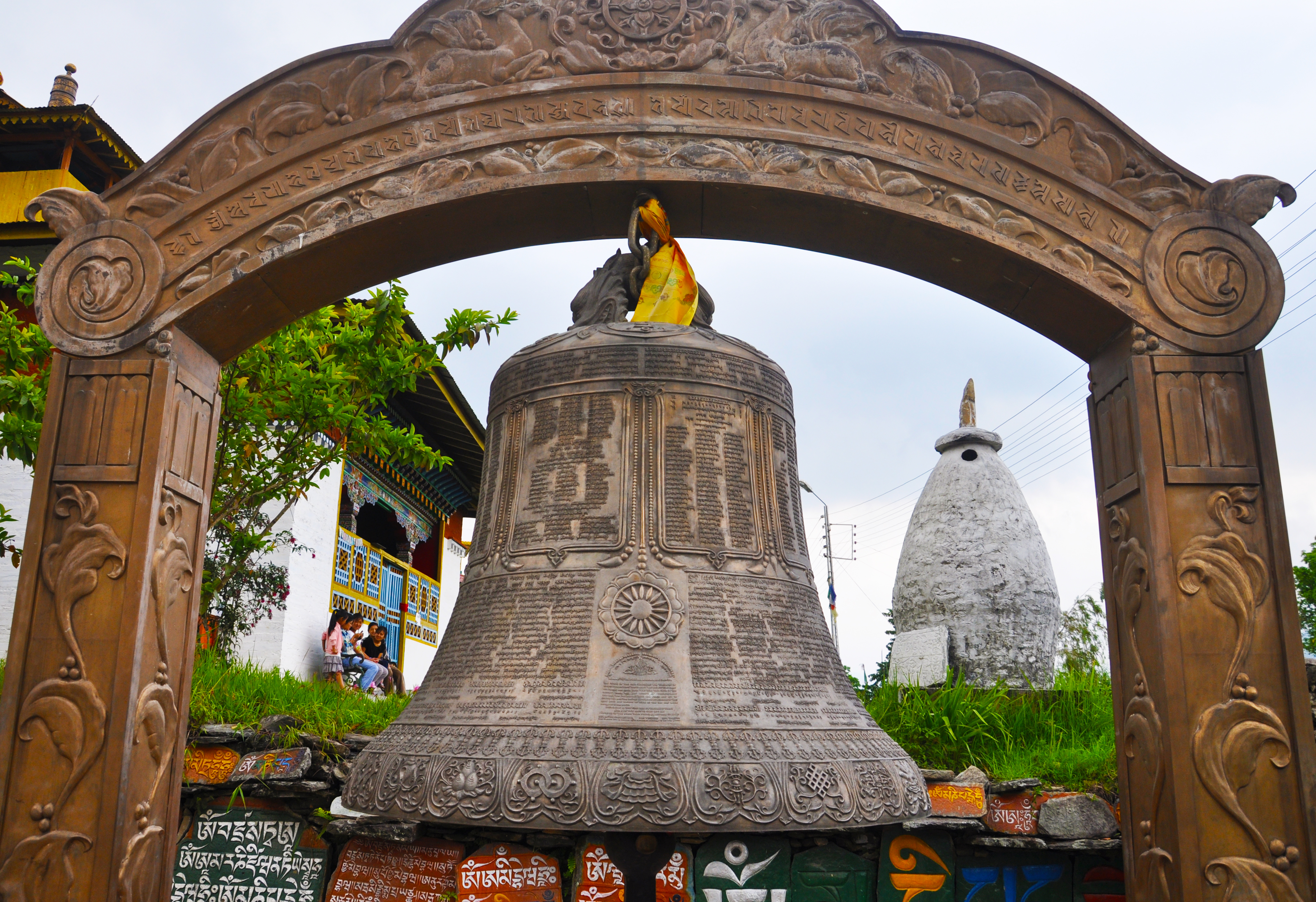
Giant Bronze Bell at Tashiding Monastery
