= Mount Pandim =

Mountain in India

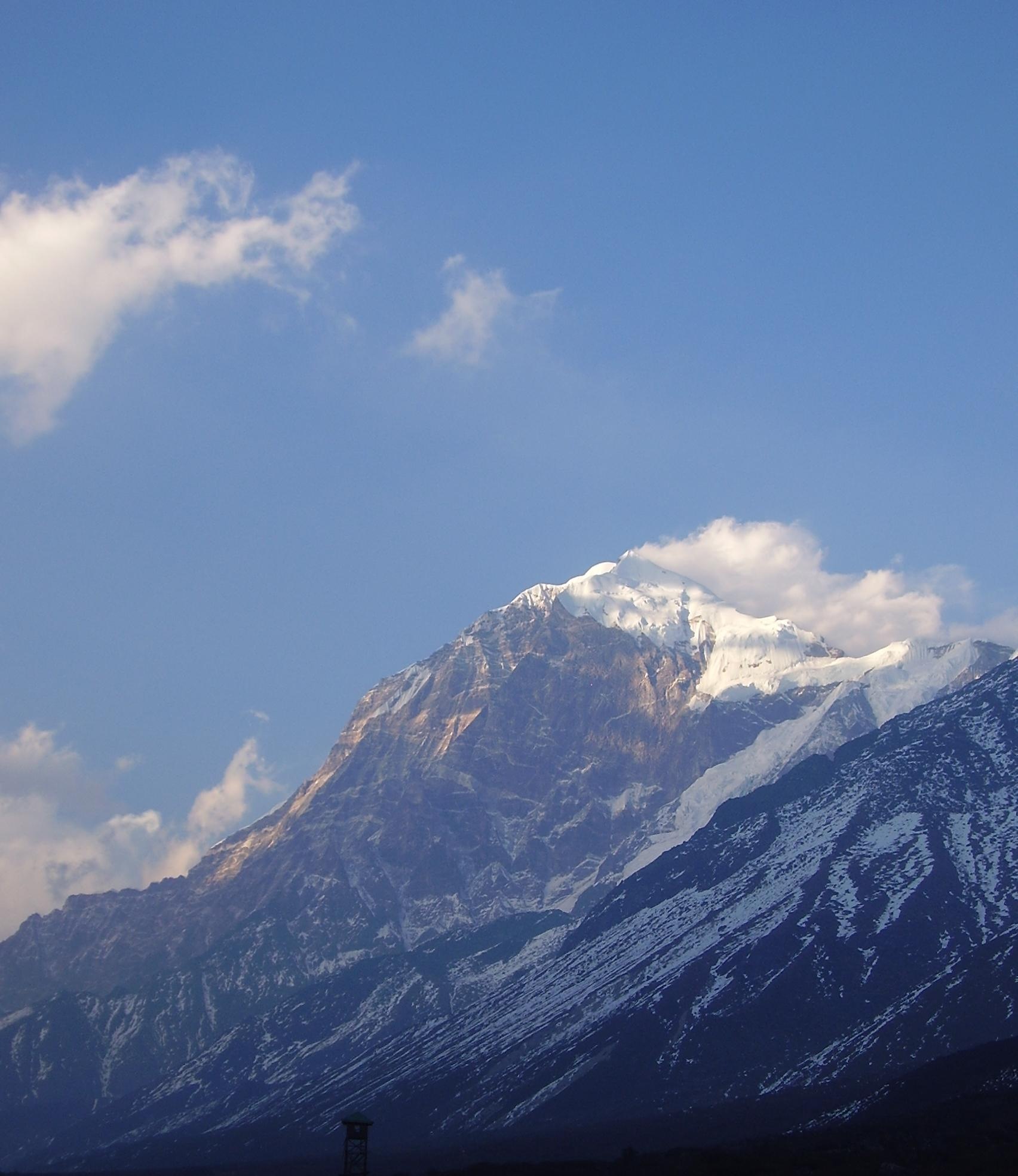
- West face of Mount Pandim, viewed from Prek Chu valley

Highest point
- Elevation: 6,691 m (21,952 ft)
- Prominence: 1,762 m (5,781 ft)
- Listing: Ultra
- Coordinates: 27°34′39″N 88°12′57″E

Geography
- Location within India
- Location: Sikkim, India
- Parent range: Himalayas

Mount Pandim is a Himalayan mountain located in Sikkim, India. It has an elevation of 6,691 m (21,952 ft) above sea level.

Pandim appears throughout the trekking trail for Goecha La, starting from Dzongri. It is also one of the prominently seen mountains from Dzongri top and gets closer to the trekking trail as we move towards Goecha La.

== Gallery ==
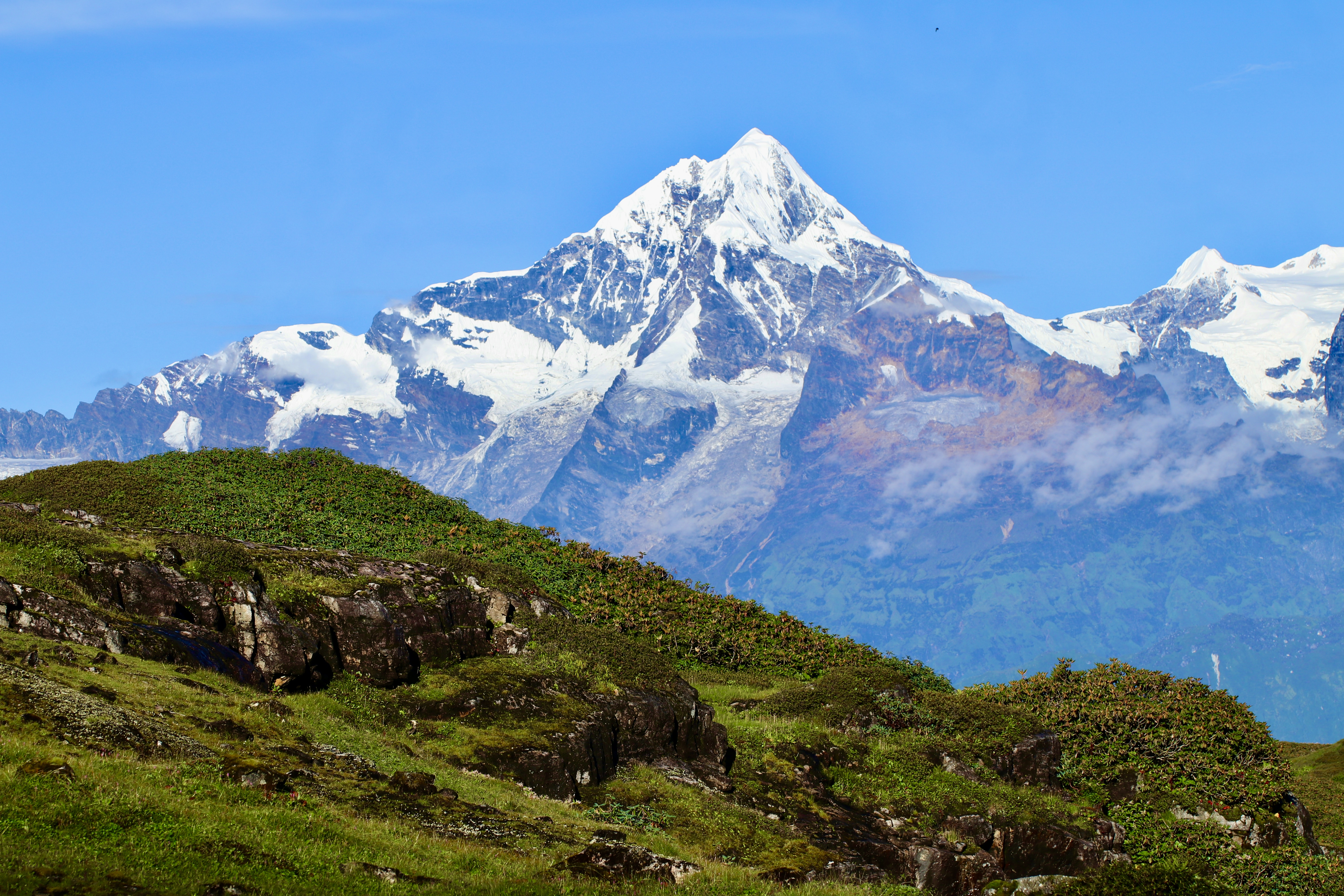
East aspect

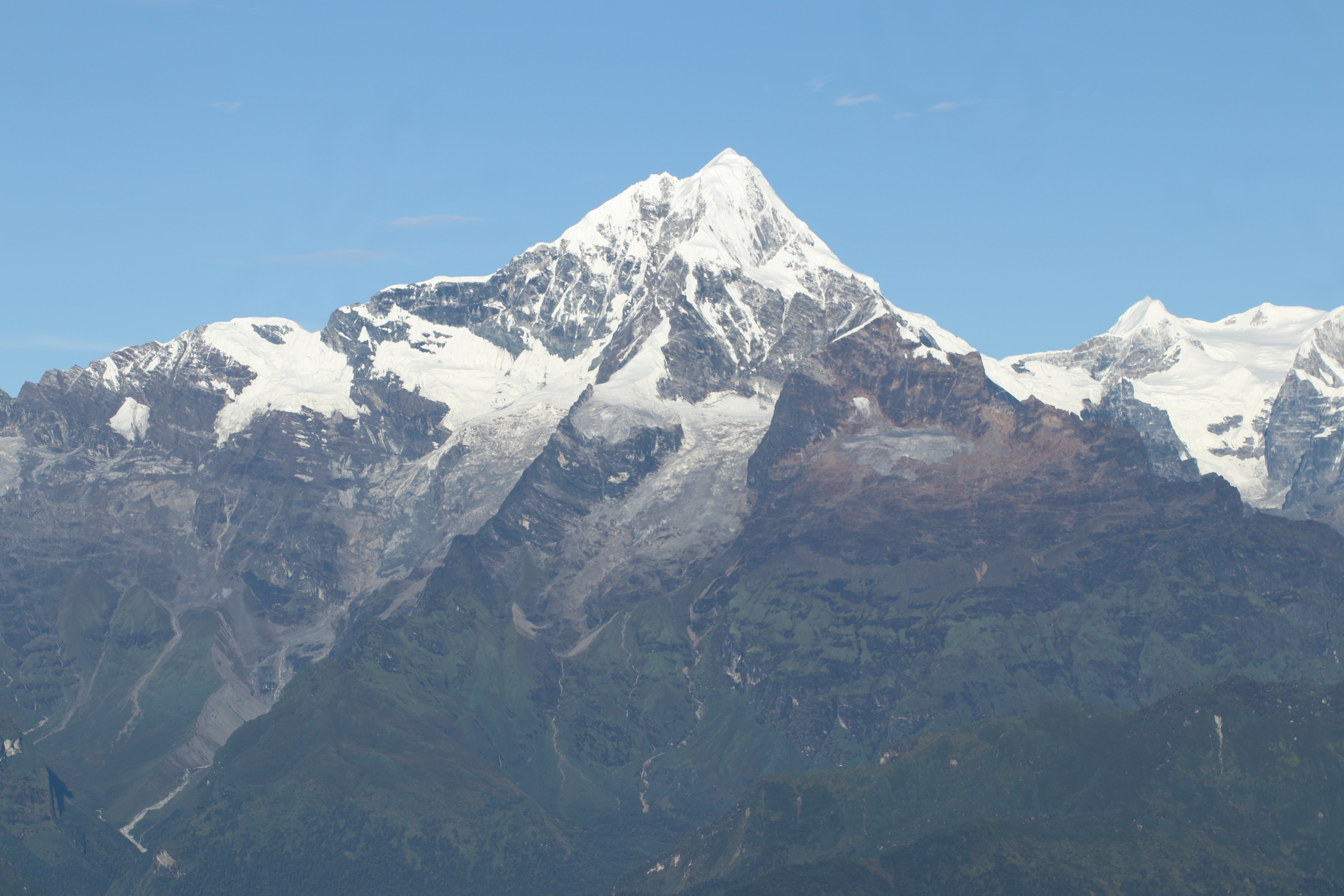
East aspect

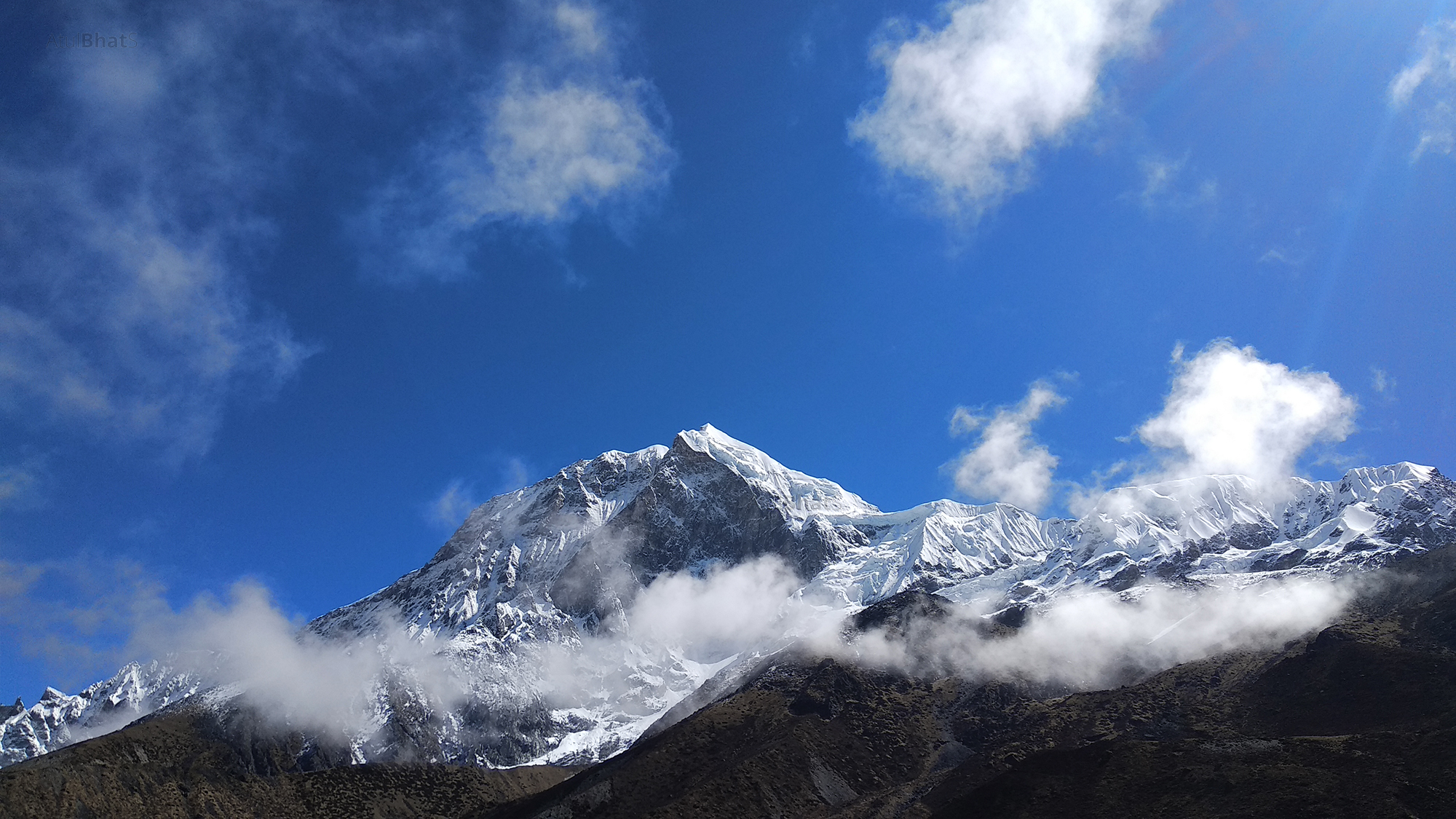
Mt. Pandiim as seen from Lamune Camp Site

== See also ==
- List of ultras of the Himalayas
