= Tarku, Nepal =

Tarku, Nepal तार्कु
- Village development committee
- Location in Nepal Tarku, Nepal (Nepal)
- Coordinates: 28.16°N 84.40°E
- Country: Nepal
- Zone: Gandaki Zone
- District: Lamjung District

Population (1991)
  - Total: 1,695
- Time zone: UTC+5:45 (Nepal Time)

Tarku, Nepal is a village development committee in Lamjung District in the Gandaki Zone of northern-central Nepal.

== Population ==
At the time of the 1991 Nepal census it had a population of 1695 people living in 335 individual households.
