= Tarku, India =

Tarku
- village
- Location in Sikkim, India Tarku (India)
- Coordinates: 27.2540°N 88.4383°E
- Country: India
- State: Sikkim
- District: Namchi

Languages
  - Official: Nepali, Bhutia, Lepcha, Limbu, Newari, Rai, Gurung, Mangar, Sherpa, Tamang and Sunwar
- Time zone: UTC+5:30 (IST)
- Vehicle registration: SK

Tarku is a small village in the Namchi district of the Indian state of Sikkim.
