= Namchi district =

District in Sikkim, India

- District of Sikkim
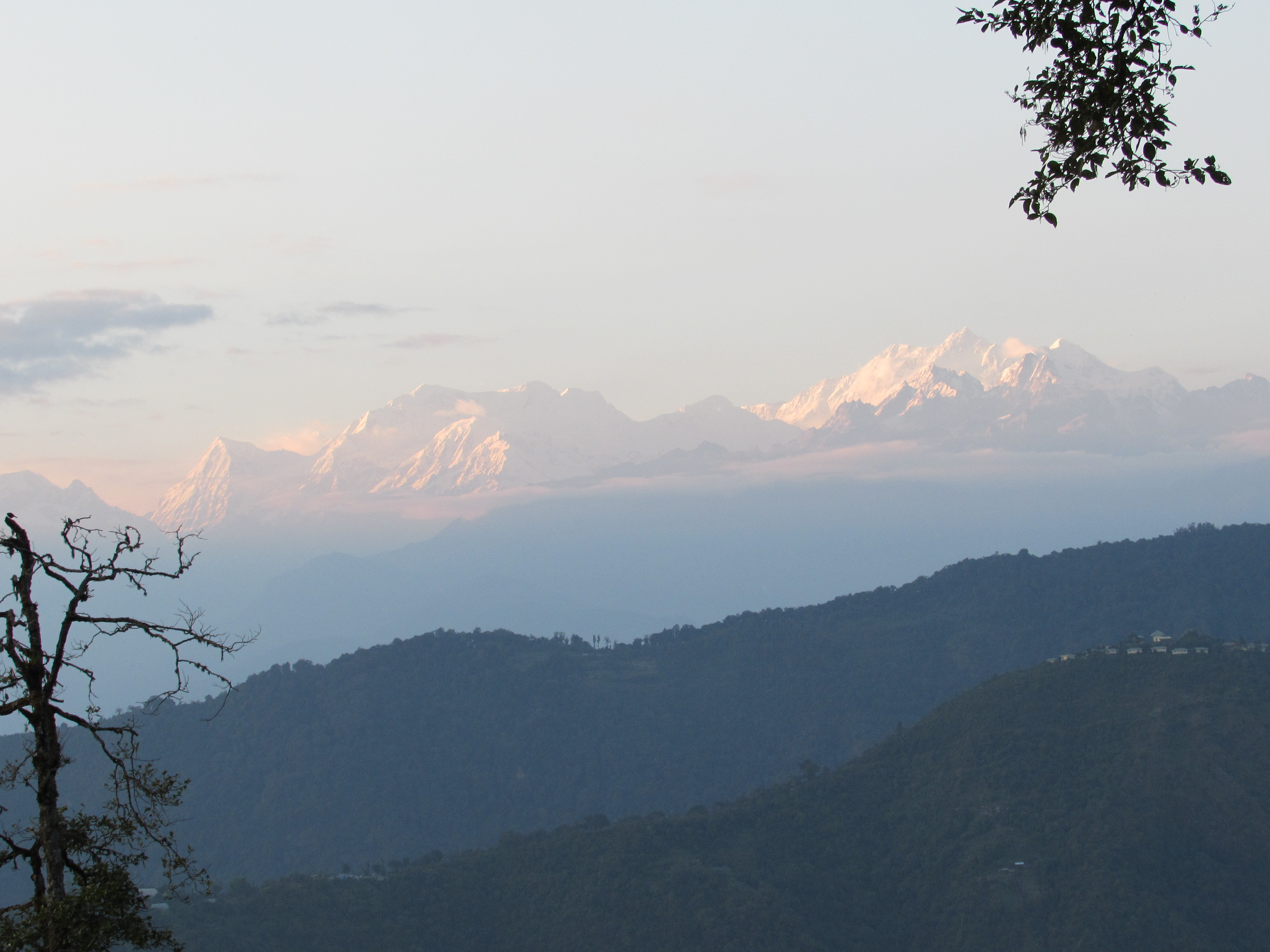
- Mountain view at Ravangla in Namchi district, Sikkim
- Namchi district Location in Sikkim
- Coordinates: 27°10′N 88°22′E
- Country: India
- State: Sikkim
- Headquarters: Namchi

Government
  - District Collector (DC): Shri M. Bharani Kumar

Area
  - Total: 750 km^{2} (290 sq mi)

Population (2011)
  - Total: 146,850
  - Density: 200/km^{2} (510/sq mi)
- Time zone: UTC+05:30 (IST)
- ISO 3166 code: IN-SK
- Vehicle registration: SK-04, SK-05
- Website: namchi.nic.in

Namchi district is a district of the Indian state of Sikkim. Its headquarters is at Namchi.

== Geography ==
Namchi district lies at an altitude of 400 to 2000 metres and has a temperate climate for most of the year. Major urban centres include Namchi, Ravangla, Jorethang and Melli.

=== Assembly Constituencies ===
The district was previously divided into eight assembly constituencies.

- Barfung (BL)
- Poklok-Kamrang
- Namchi-Singhithang
- Melli
- Namthang-Rateypani
- Temi-Namphing
- Rangang-Yangang
- Tumen-Lingi (BL)

=== National protected area ===
- Maenam Wildlife Sanctuary

== Economy ==
South Sikkim is the most industrialised district in the state, owing to the availability of flat land. Since the geology is stable the roads are in good condition as compared to other parts of the state which suffer from landslides. The district is also known for Sikkim tea, which is grown near Namchi.

== Demographics ==
According to the 2011 census, Namchi district has a population of 146,850, roughly equal to the nation of Saint Lucia. This gives it a ranking of 600th in India (out of a total of 640). The district has a population density of 196 inhabitants per square kilometre (510/sq mi). Its population growth rate over the decade 2001–2011 was 11.57%. and has a sex ratio of 914 females for every 1000 males, and a literacy rate of 82.06%. 14.44% of the population lives in urban areas. Scheduled Castes and Scheduled Tribes make up 4.12% and 28.19% of the population respectively.

Namchi is one of the least populated regions of the state. The people are mainly of Nepali descent. Other ethnic groups include the Lepcha and Bhutia communities. Nepali is the most widely spoken language in the district. The district was under the occupation of the Nepalese for 30 years in the eighteenth and nineteenth centuries.

=== Religion ===
Religion in Namchi district (2011)
Hinduism	57.60%
Buddhism	23.87%
Christianity	14.61%
Other (mainly Kirat Mundhum)	2.16%
Islam	1.29%
Other or not stated	0.47%

Hinduism is followed by majority of the people in the South Sikkim district. Buddhism is followed by a considerable population.

=== Languages ===
Languages of Namchi district (2011)
1. Nepali (72.7%)
2. Bhotia (3.88%)
3. Lepcha (3.61%)
4. Limbu (3.57%)
5. Hindi (3.25%)
6. Sherpa (3.19%)
7. Tamang (2.46%)
8. Rai (1.65%)
9. Bhojpuri (1.26%)
10. Others (4.47%)

At the time of the 2011 Census of India, 72.66% of the population in the district spoke Nepali, 3.88% Sikkimese, 3.61% Lepcha, 3.57% Limbu, 3.25% Hindi, 3.19% Sherpa, 2.46% Tamang, 1.65% Rai, 1.26% Bhojpuri, 0.88% Tibetan and 0.83% Bengali as their first language.

== Flora and fauna ==
The Maenam Wildlife Sanctuary was established in 1987. It has an area of 35 km^{2} (13.5 mi^{2}).

== Divisions ==
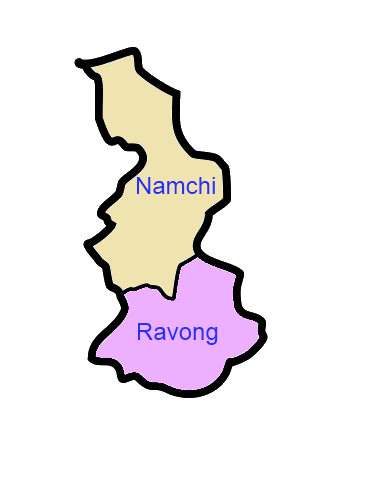
A clickable map of South Sikkim exhibiting its two subdivisions.

=== Administrative divisions ===
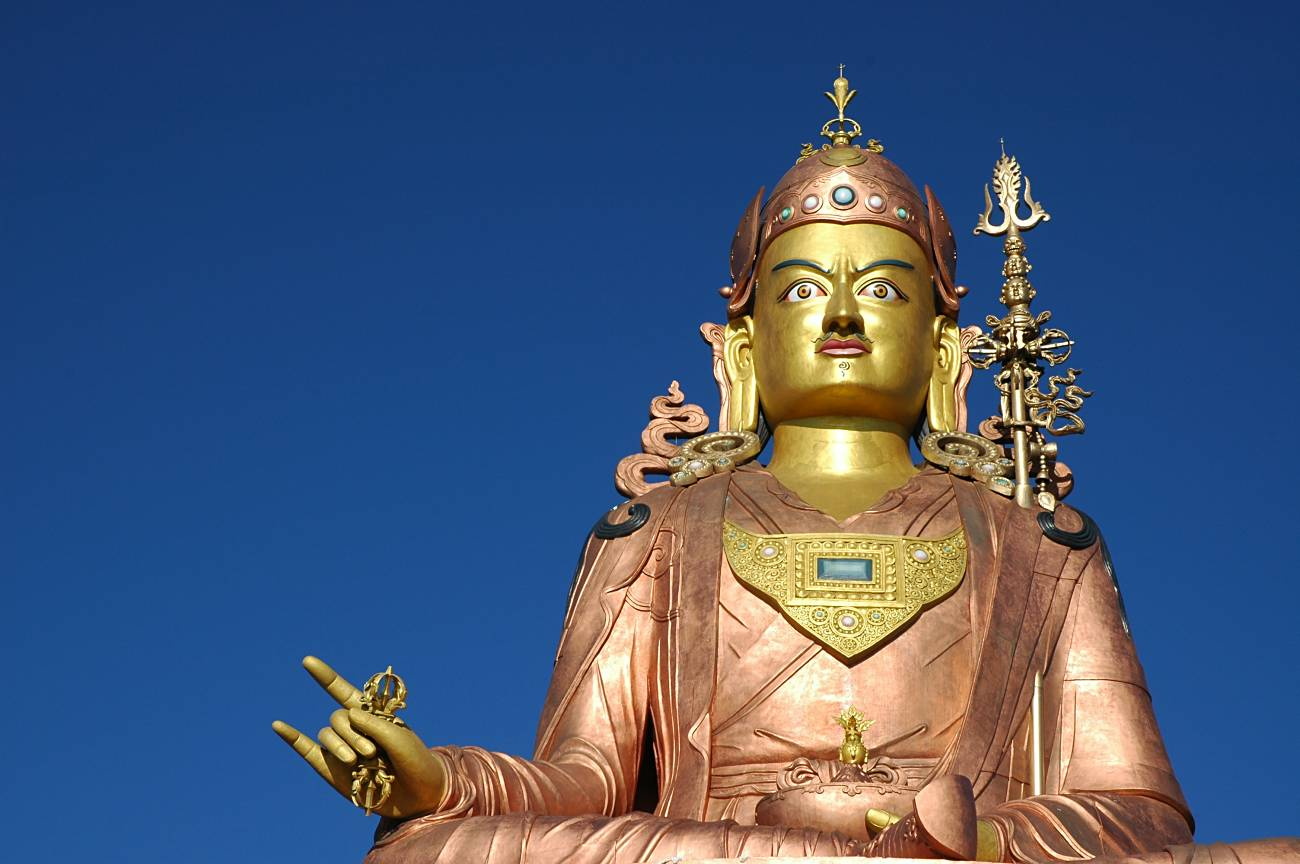
Padmasambhava, the patron saint of Sikkim

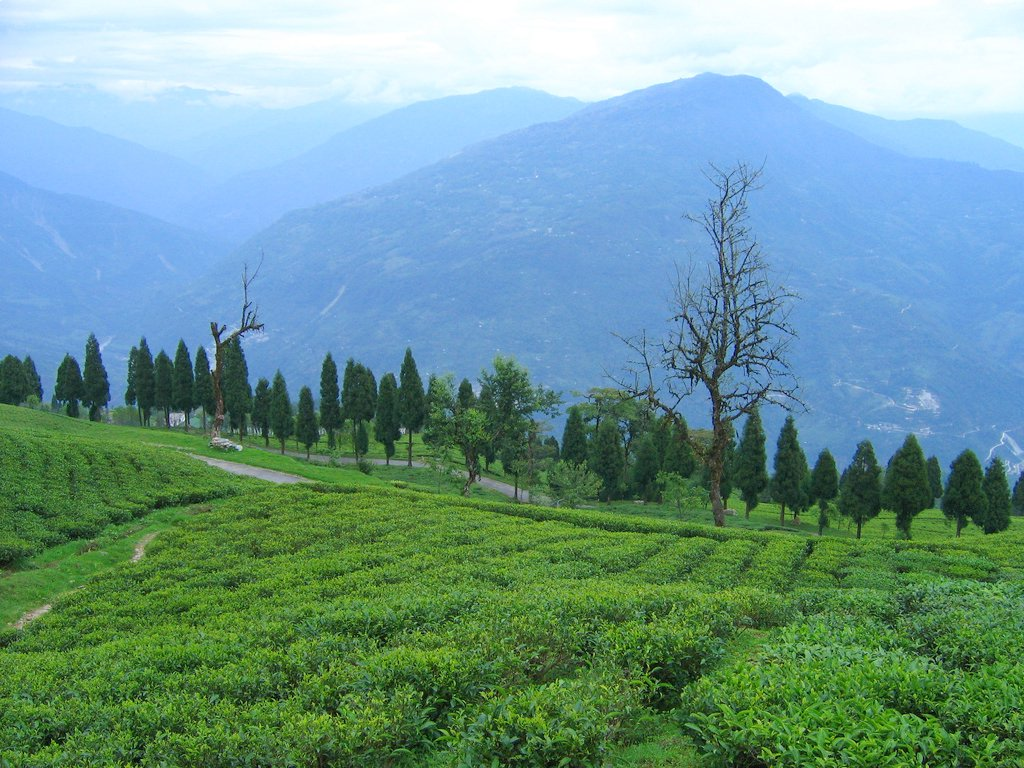
Tea garden

Scenes from the district

Namchi district is divided into two sub-divisions:

Name	Headquarters	Number of villages	Population (2011)	Area	Location
Namchi	Namchi		98,895	296	
Ravangla	Ravangla		47,955	454	

== Villages ==
- Melli Dara
- Perbing
