= Buddhist pilgrimage sites in India =

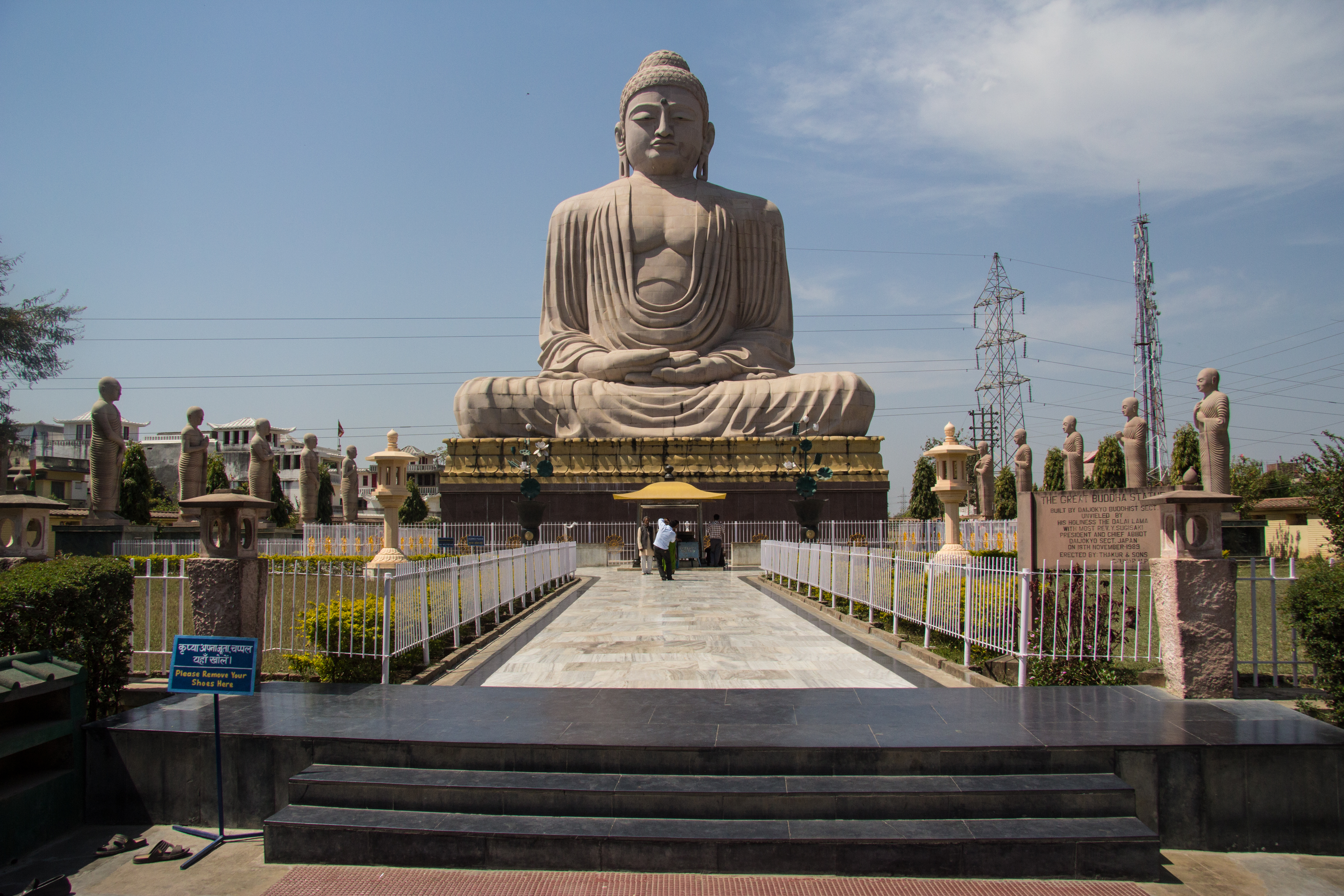
"Great Buddha Statue" at Bodh Gaya

In religion and spirituality, a pilgrimage is a long journey or search of great moral significance. Sometimes, it is a journey to a sacred place or to a shrine of importance to a person's beliefs and faith. Members of every major religion participate in pilgrimages. A person who makes such a journey is called a pilgrim.

There are number of historical Buddhist pilgrimage sites in the Republic of India.

== Places associated with the life of Buddha ==
=== Primary sites ===
Buddhism offers four primary sites of pilgrimage: Lumbini (birthplace of the Buddha), Bodh Gaya (the site where the Buddha attained enlightenment), Sarnath (the location of the Buddha’s first sermon), and Kushinagar (the location where the Buddha attained parinirvana). All of these sites are located in India except Lumbini, which is located in southern Nepal. Bodh Gaya is the holiest site of Buddhism.

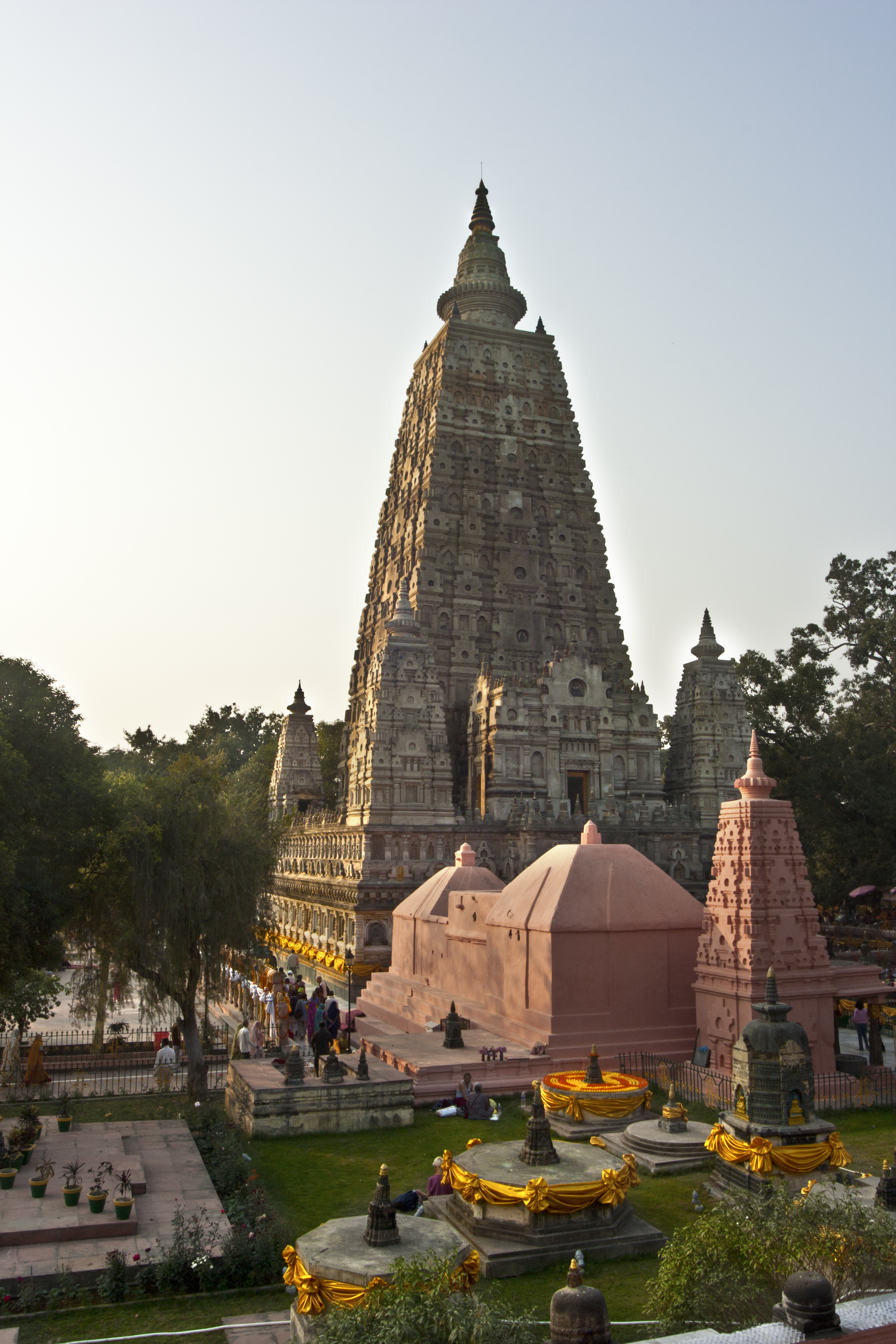
"Maha Bodhi Temple" at Bodh Gaya

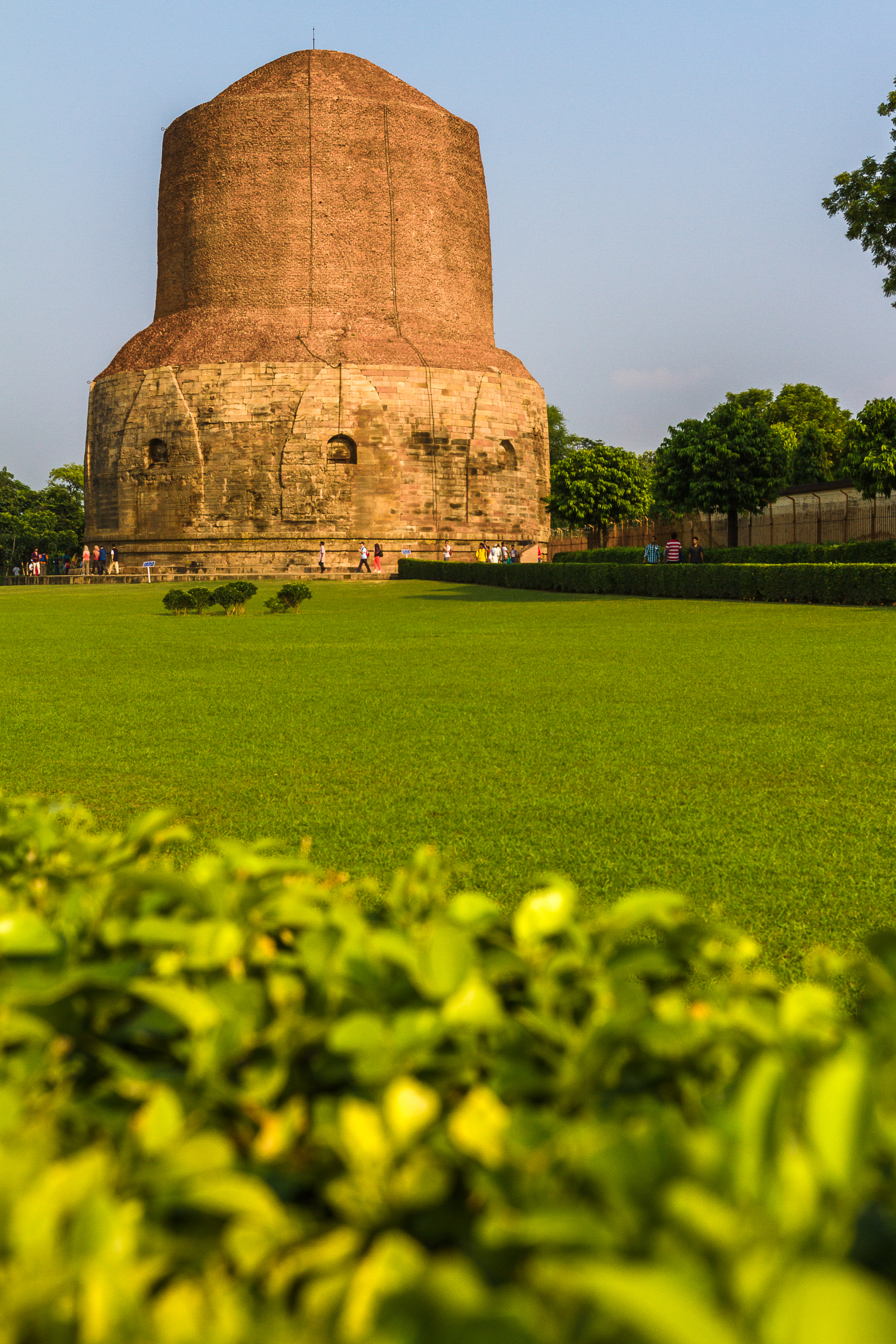
Dhamek Stupa, Sarnath

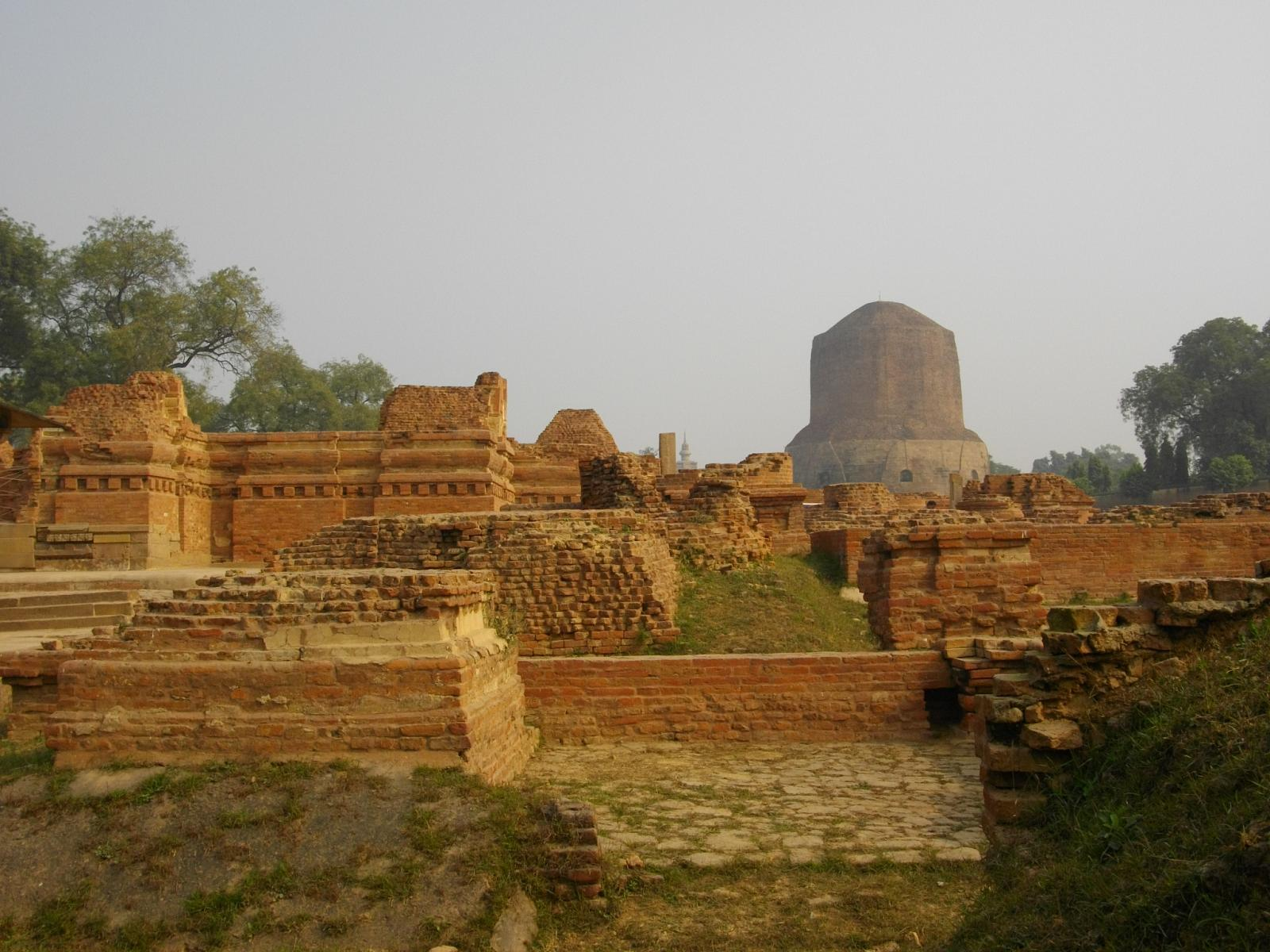
Ancient Buddhist Monastery at Sarnath

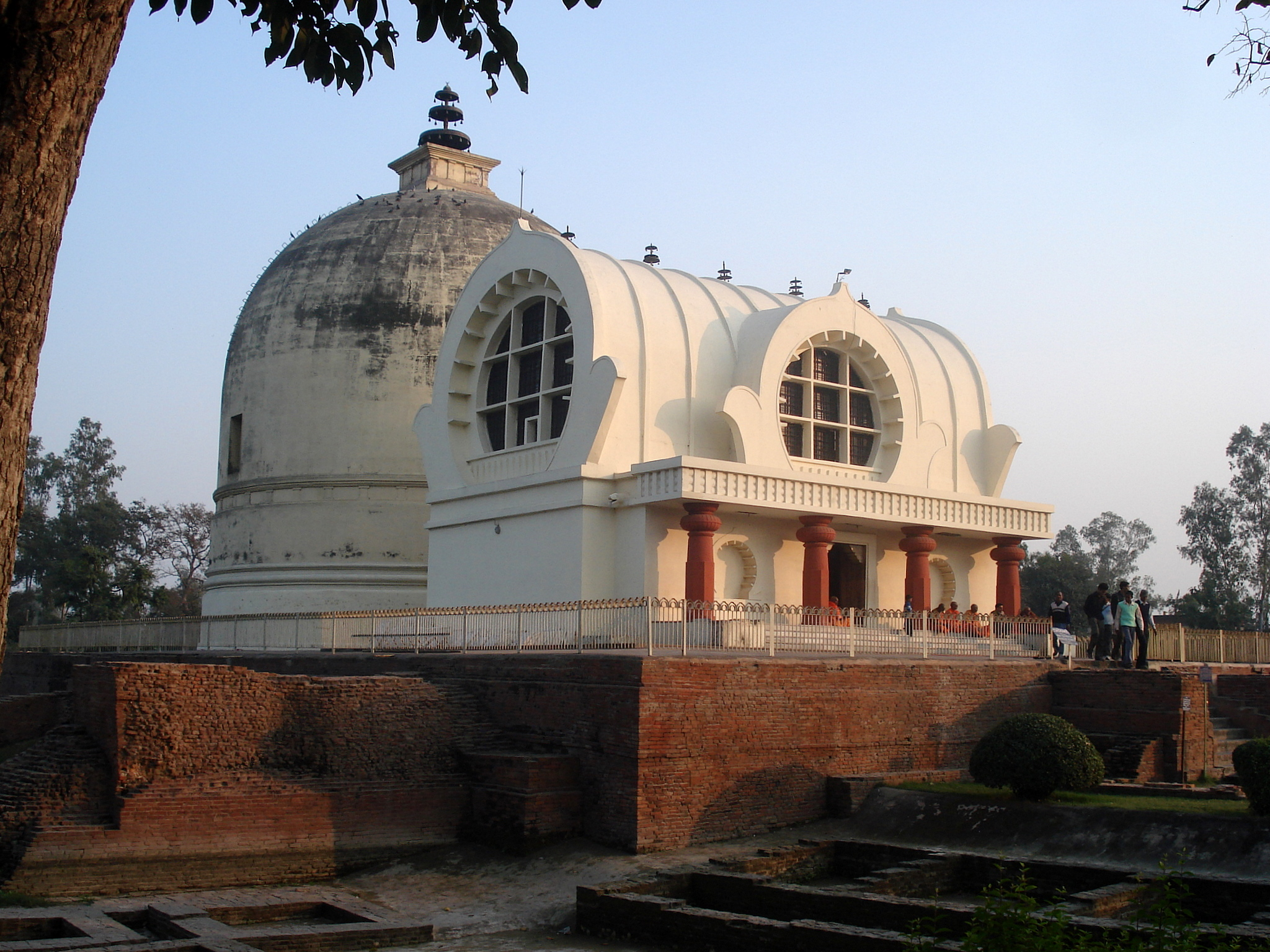
Parinirvana Stupa at Kushinagar

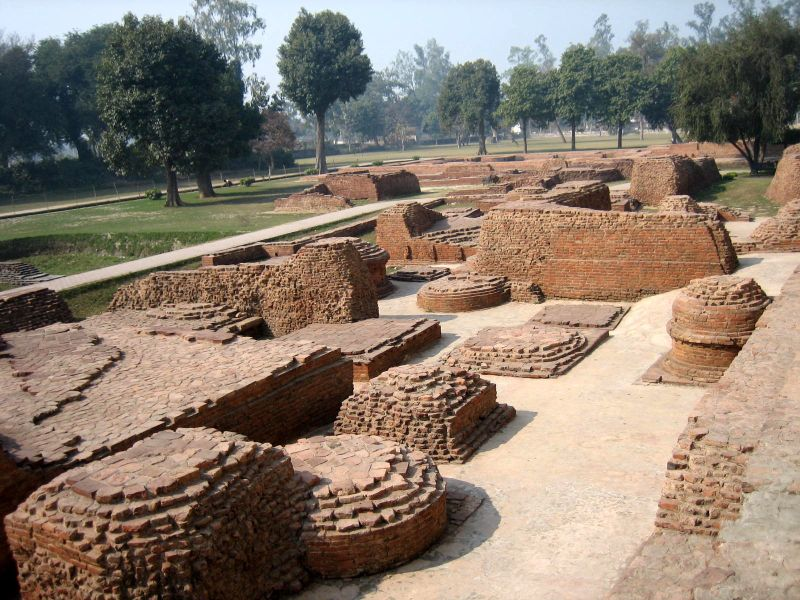
Remains of ancient stupas in Kushinagar

=== Places visited by Buddha for discourse ===
- Andhra Pradesh:
  - Nagarjunakonda in Guntur district: Seat of Mahayana
  - Thotlakonda and Bojjannakonda in Visakhapatnam
- Bihar: The name of Bihar is derived from vihara, meaning monastery, such was the association of the area with Buddhism. In addition to these sites which were visited by the Buddha, other sites in India have become notable:
  - Patna – Formerly known as Pataliputra, it was the seat of the Mauryan empire and a significant Buddhist centre
  - Rajgir, Bihar – Formerly known as Rajagaha, it was the capital of Magadha, ruled by King Bimbisara, one of the most prominent monarchs and supporters during the lifetime of the Buddha
  - Nalanda, Bihar – Site of an ancient Buddhist university, destroyed by Bakhtiyar Khalji during Islamic attacks
  - Sravasti, Uttar Pradesh – Formerly known as Savatthi, it was the capital of Kosala, ruled by King Pasenadi, one of the most prominent monarchs and supporters during the lifetime of the Buddha
  - Vaishali, Bihar – Seat of a republican state of the Lichchavis, prominent supporters of the Buddha. Site of the Second Buddhist Council
- Haryana: Sacred places in the order of travel by Buddha, where he gave several important discourses documented in the Pali texts. After visiting Mathura, he travelled along Grand Trunk Road in Haryana (also see Buddhist pilgrimage sites in Haryana).
  - From Mathura in Uttar Pradesh, Buddha travelled along Grand Trunk Road in Haryana (also see Buddhist pilgrimage sites in Haryana).
  - Kamashpura Aastha Pugdal Pagoda (Kumashpur) in Sonipat city, the place where Buddha gave Mahasatipatthana sutta),.
  - Kurukshetra Stupa on the banks of sacred Brahma Sarovar in Kurukshetra city
  - Topra between Kurukshetra and Yamunanagar, now has a large open air museum park housing several replica of Ashoka's edicts including largest Ashoka Chakra in the world
  - Srughna, now known as the Sugh Ancient Mound, on outskirts of Yamunanagar city
  - Chaneti Stupa, on outskirts of Yamunanagar city

== Other prominent historic Buddhist sites by state ==
All are the historic ancient sites of learning, and the list includes very few relatively new sites which have been specifically highlighted accordingly. Most of these sites have association with Ashoka and other Buddhist kings.

=== Andhra Pradesh ===
- Amaravati
- Bavikonda
- Bojjannakonda
- Bhattiprolu
- Chandavaram
- Dharanikota
- Ghantasala
- Gudivada
- Guntupalli
- Jaggayyapeta
- Nagarjunakonda
- Pavurallakonda museum
- Ramatheertham
- Salihundam
- Thotlakonda
- Undavalli Caves
- Visakhapatnam

=== Assam ===
- Namphake in Dibrugarh
- Surya Pahar in Goalpara
- Hayagriva Madhava at Hajo

=== Bihar ===
- Kesaria stupa
- Krimila
- Nalanda
- Odantapuri
- Saptaparni Cave
- Sujata Stupa
- Vaishali
- Vikramshila
- Vulture Peak

=== Goa ===
- Lamgao caves
- Rivona caves

=== Gujarat ===
- Vadnagar in Mehsana district

=== Haryana ===
In 2021, it was announced that Buddha Haryana circuit will be developed by the Centre for yatra (pilgrimage).

Also see above the "places visited by Buddha for discourse" which has additional sites in Haryana.

- Adi Badri, Haryana
- Mounds: Agroha Mound, Sugh Ancient Mound
- Pillars of Ashoka: (Hisar, Fatehabad Ashokan Pillar, Topra Kalan Edicts Museum)

=== Jammu and Kashmir ===
- Harwan, near Mughal Shalimar Garden, dating from the fifth century
- Parihaspore, 20 km northeast of Srinagar
- Panderathan, near Srinagar

=== Madhya Pradesh ===
- Bagh Caves
- Sanchi, site of a large stupa built by Ashoka which also houses the relics of Sariputra and Mahamoggallana, the two chief disciples of the Buddha; reputedly the place from which Mahinda set out to proselytise Sri Lanka.

=== Maharashtra ===
- Ajanta, site of intricate Buddhist cave paintings depicting Buddhism
- Karla Caves site of intricate Buddhist cave paintings
- Ellora, site of intricate Buddhist cave paintings
- Deekshabhoomi, a new 20th century site associated with Dr. Bhimrao Ambedkar

=== Odisha ===
- Lalitgiri
- Ratnagiri
- Udayagiri

=== Telangana ===
- Nelakondapalli,
- Phanigiri

=== Tripura ===
- Pilak, an archaeological site in the Santirbazar sub-division of South Tripura district

=== Uttar Pradesh ===
- Kosambi
- Mathura
- Pāvā (Fazilnagar)
- Piprahwa

== Tibetan Buddhist sites ==
=== By state ===
- Arunachal Pradesh: Tawang
- Sikkim: Dubdi Monastery, Enchey Monastery, Pemayangtse Monastery, Ralang Monastery, Rumtek, Tashiding Monastery, Tawang Monastery, Zang Dhok Palri Phodang
- Himachal Pradesh:
  - Dharamsala,
  - McLeod Ganj at Dharamsala, the primary seat of current Dalai Lama
  - Palpung Sherabling Monastery at Baijnath
  - Tabo Monastery, Spiti Valley, Himachal Pradesh
  - Rewalsar Lake
- Karnataka: Namdroling Monastery in Bylakuppe near Mysore
- Ladakh: Leh

=== Sikkim ===
- Dubdi Monastery, occasionally called 'Yuksom Monastery' is a Buddhist monastery of the Nyingma sect of Tibetan Buddhism near Yuksom, in the Geyzing subdivision of West Sikkim district.
- Enchey Monastery is located in Gangtok, the capital city of Sikkim in the Northeastern Indian state. It belongs to the Nyingma order of Vajrayana Buddhism.
- Pemayangtse Monastery is a Buddhist monastery in Pemayangtse, near Pelling in the northeastern Indian state of Sikkim, located 140 kilometres (87 mi) west of Gangtok.
- Ralang Monastery is a Buddhist monastery of the Kagyu sect of Tibetan Buddhism in southern Sikkim, northeastern India. It is located six kilometres from Ravangla.
- Rumtek Monastery also called the "Dharmachakra Centre", is a gompa located in the Indian state of Sikkim near the capital Gangtok. It is a focal point for the sectarian tensions within the Karma Kagyu school of Tibetan Buddhism that characterize the Karmapa controversy.
- Tashiding Monastery is a Buddhist monastery of the Nyingma sect of Tibetan Buddhism in Western Sikkim, northeastern India. It is located on top of the hill rising between the Rathong chu and the Rangeet River.
- Tawang Monastery in the Indian state of Arunachal Pradesh is the largest monastery in India and second largest in the world after the Potala Palace in Lhasa, Tibet.
- Zang Dhok Palri Phodang is a Buddhist monastery in Kalimpong in West Bengal, India. The monastery is located atop Durpin Hill, one of the two hills of the town. It was consecrated in 1976 by the visiting Dalai Lama.
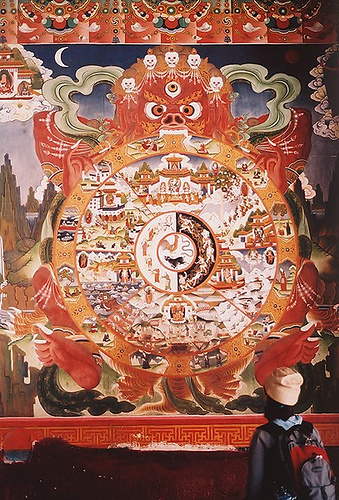
The Manadala at the "Kakaling", the entry gate to the Tawang Monastery

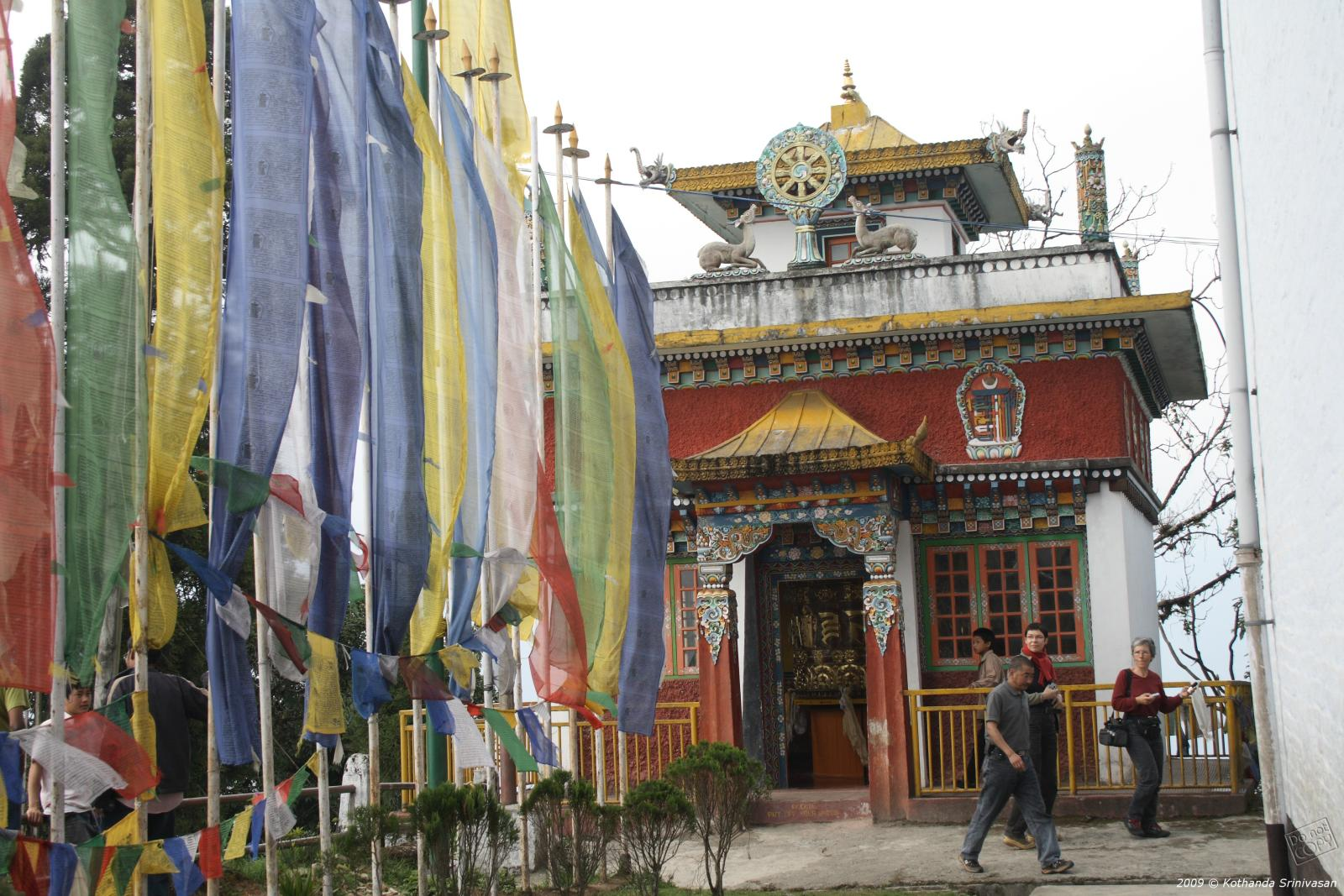
Pemayangtse Monastery

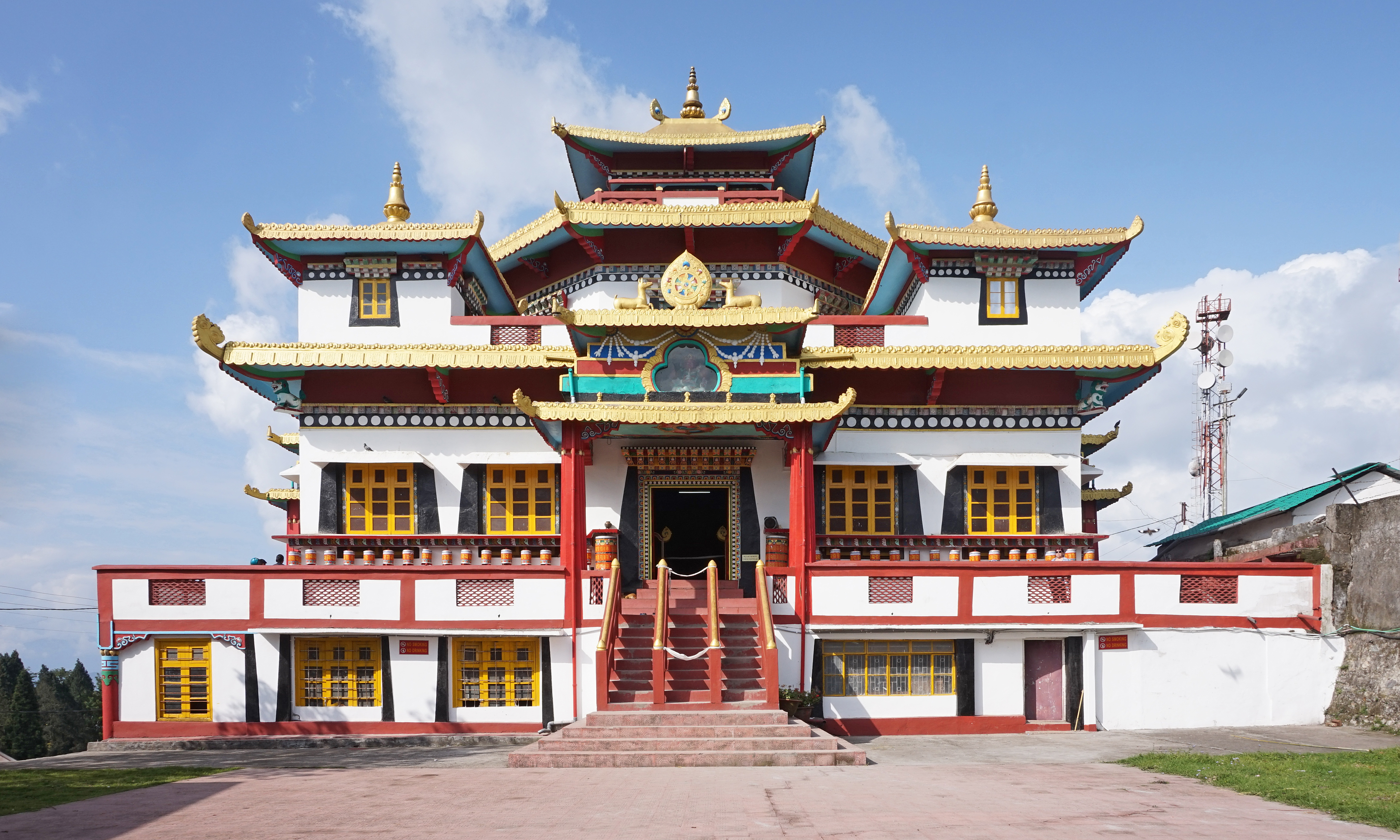
The Zang Dhok Palri Phodang monastery atop Durpin Hill

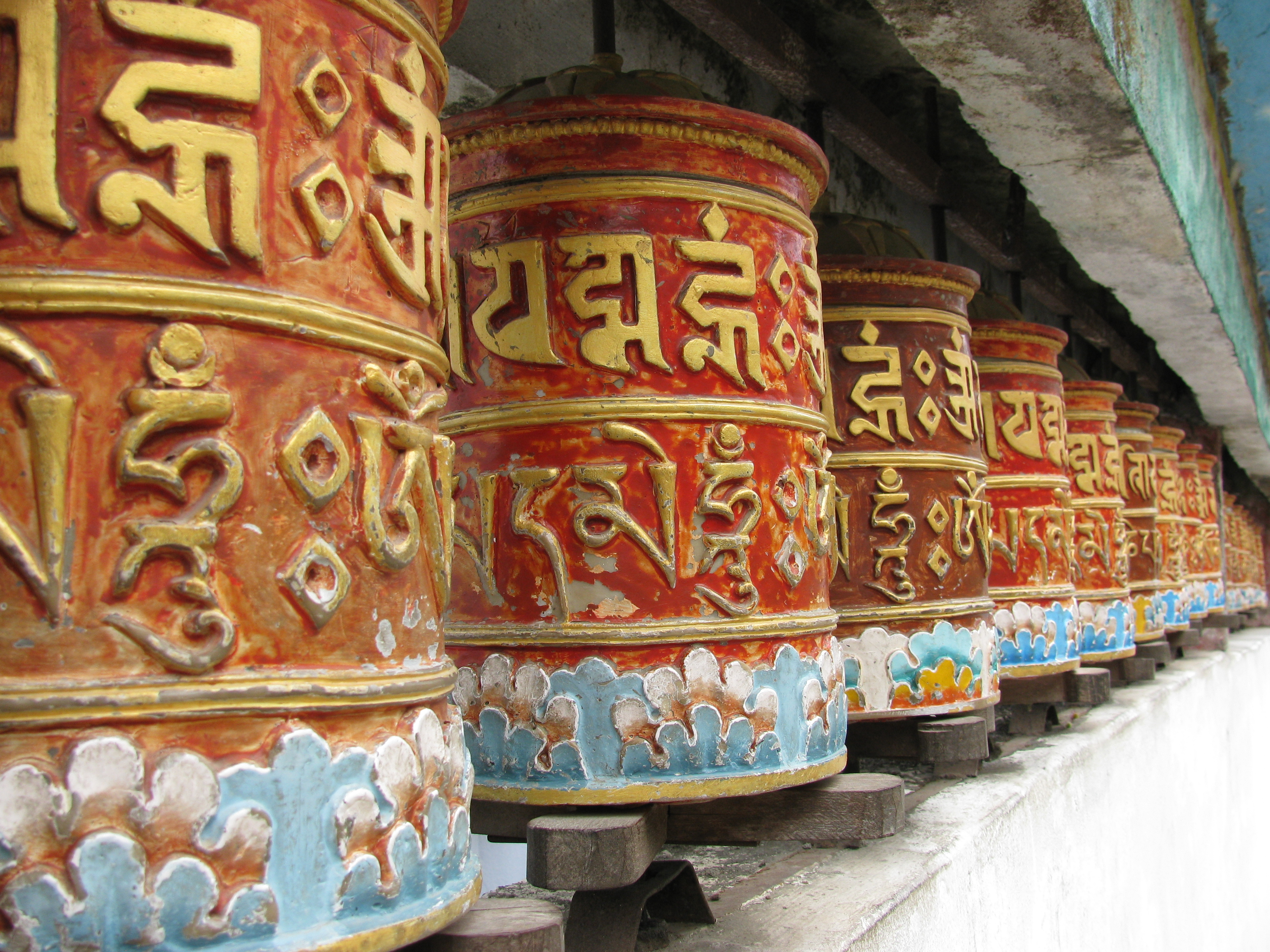
Prayer Wheels in the Rumtek Monastery

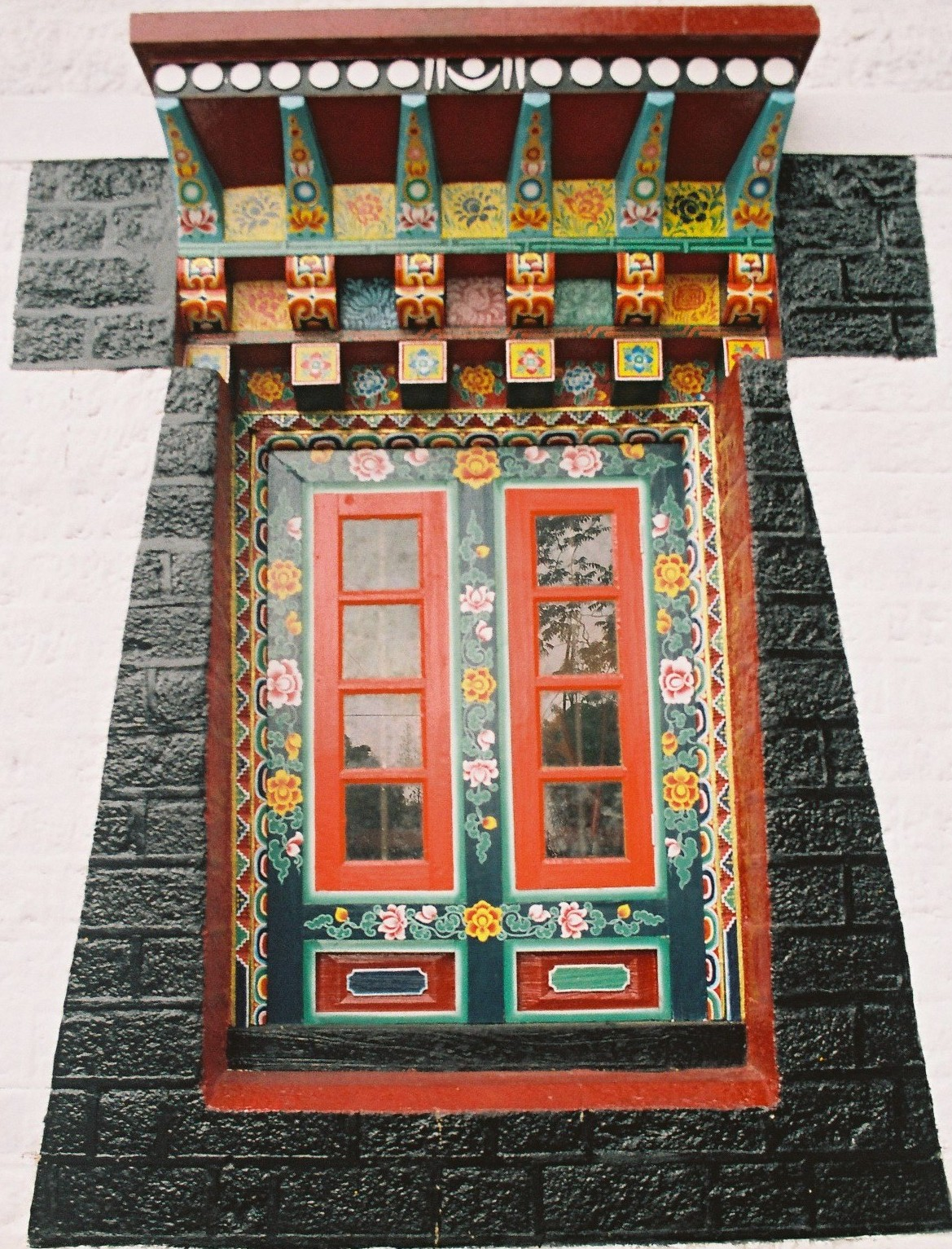
Ornately carved colourful Window of Enchey Monastery

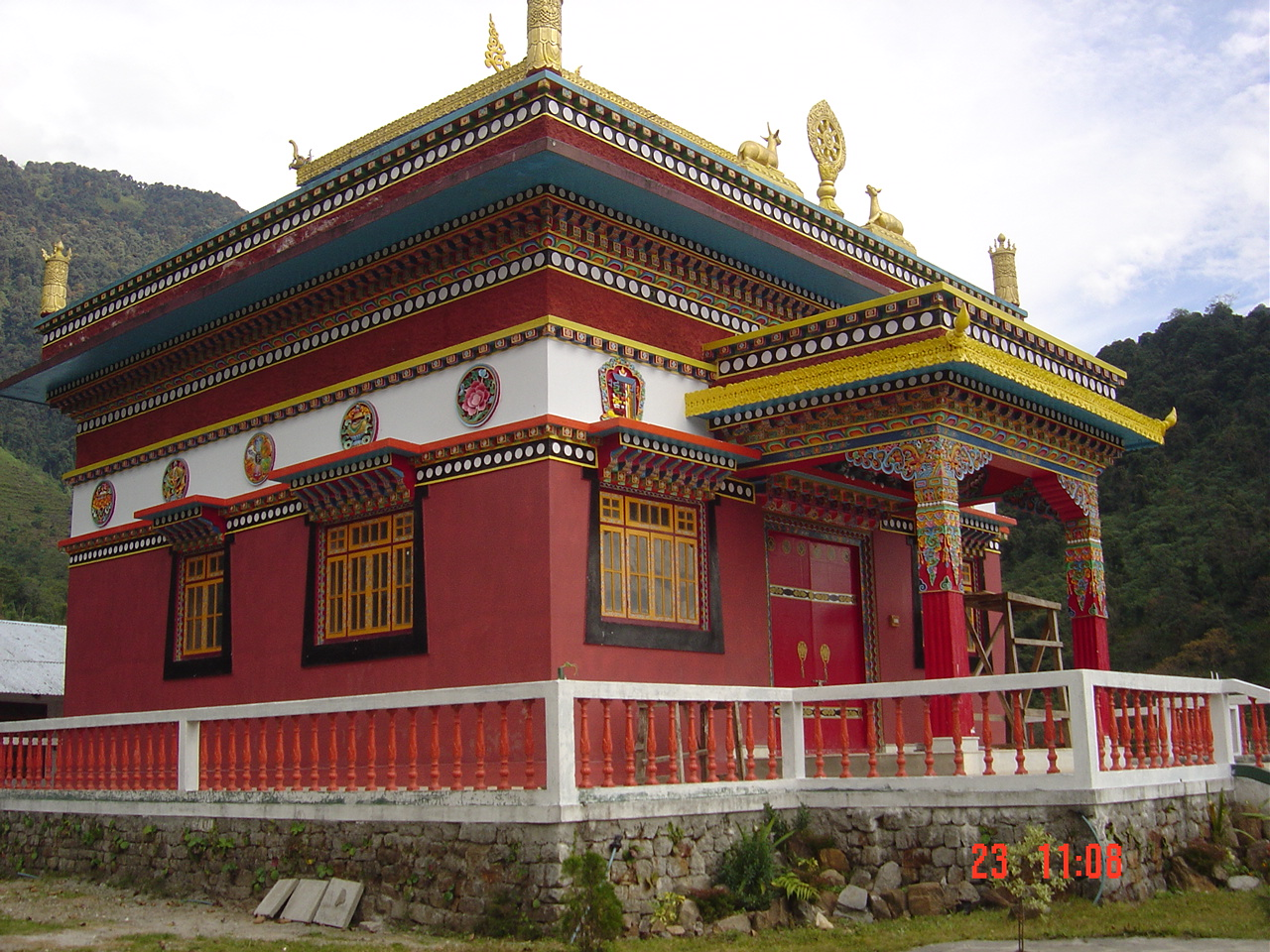
Dubdi Monastery

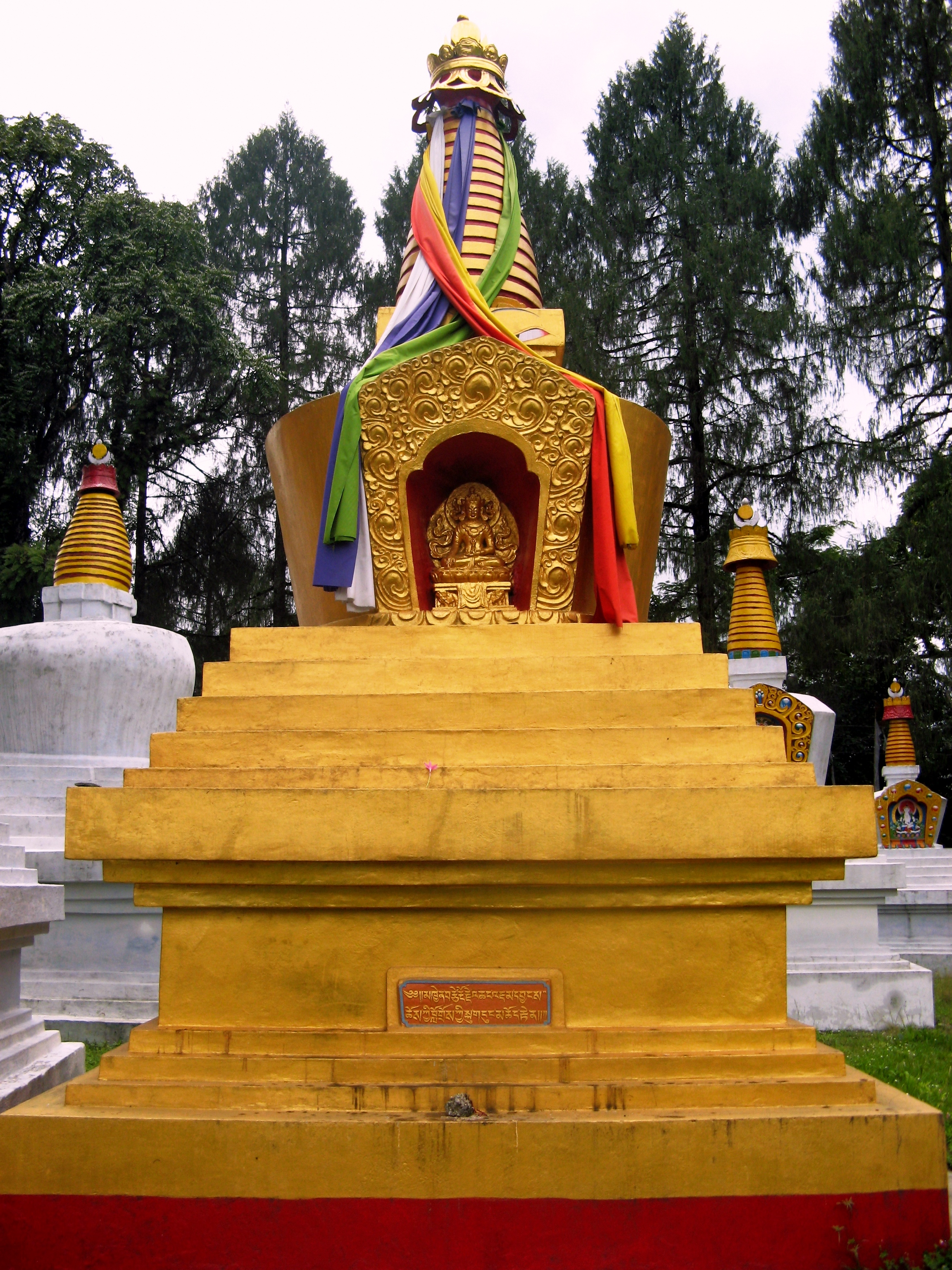
The Golden Chorten near Tashiding Monastery

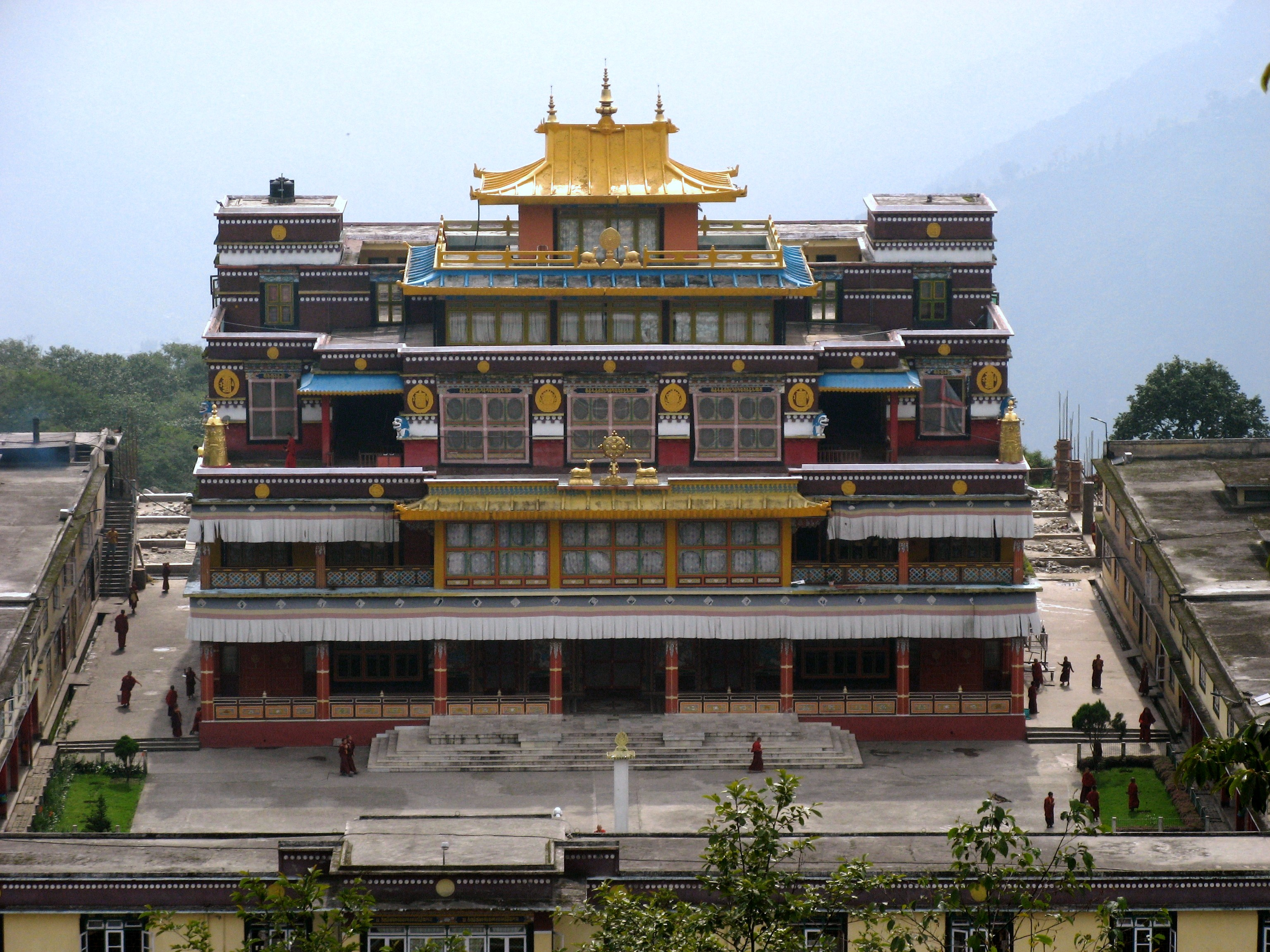
Ralang Monastery
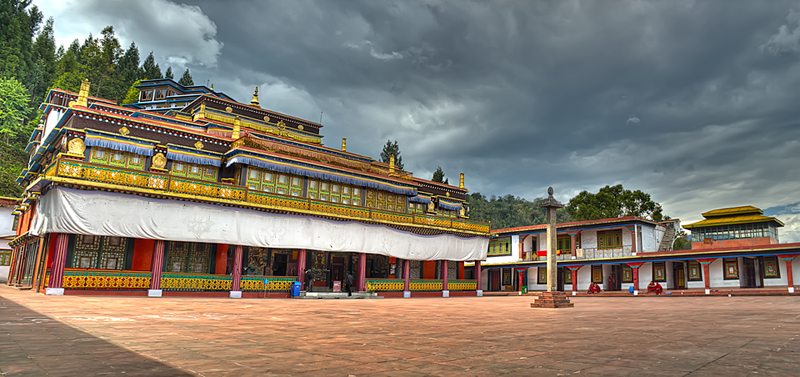
Rumtek Monastery, Sikkim, India

== See also ==
- Buddhist pilgrimage
- Buddhist pilgrimage sites in Nepal
- Shikoku Pilgrimage, Eighty-eight Temples pilgrimage in the Shikoku island, Japan
- Japan 100 Kannon Pilgrimage, pilgrimage circuit that is composed of three independent pilgrimages (Saigoku, Bandō and Chichibu) in Japan
