= Sinon Monastery =

Buddhist monastery in Sikkim, India

Religion
- Affiliation: Tibetan Buddhism

Location
- Location: Sikkim, India
- Country: India
- Interactive map of Sinon Monastery
- Coordinates: 27.3421846°N 88.2890602°E

Architecture
- Established: 1716

Sinon Monastery is a Buddhist monastery in Sikkim, northeastern India.Sinon Monastery is located in West Sikkim District. Sinon means 'the suppressor of intense fear'. The monastery was constructed in 1716 and is situated on a hilltop, 10 km from Tashiding. The monastery was built under the leadership of Pedi Wangmo, half-sister of Chogyal Chagdor Namgyal. The famous painting, Pedi Wangmo, can be found in the Sinon Monastery. Another famous Sikkimese artwork found in the monastery is a painting of Arhat Nagasena. The saint's peaceful face is expressed with a minimum of colours and line drawings. The painting displays strong influence of the Ajanta cave paintings. The nearest airport is Civil Enclave Bagdogra

== See also ==
- Buddhism
- Gautama Buddha
- History of Buddhism in India
- Buddhist pilgrimage sites in India
