= Enchey Monastery =

Monastery in India

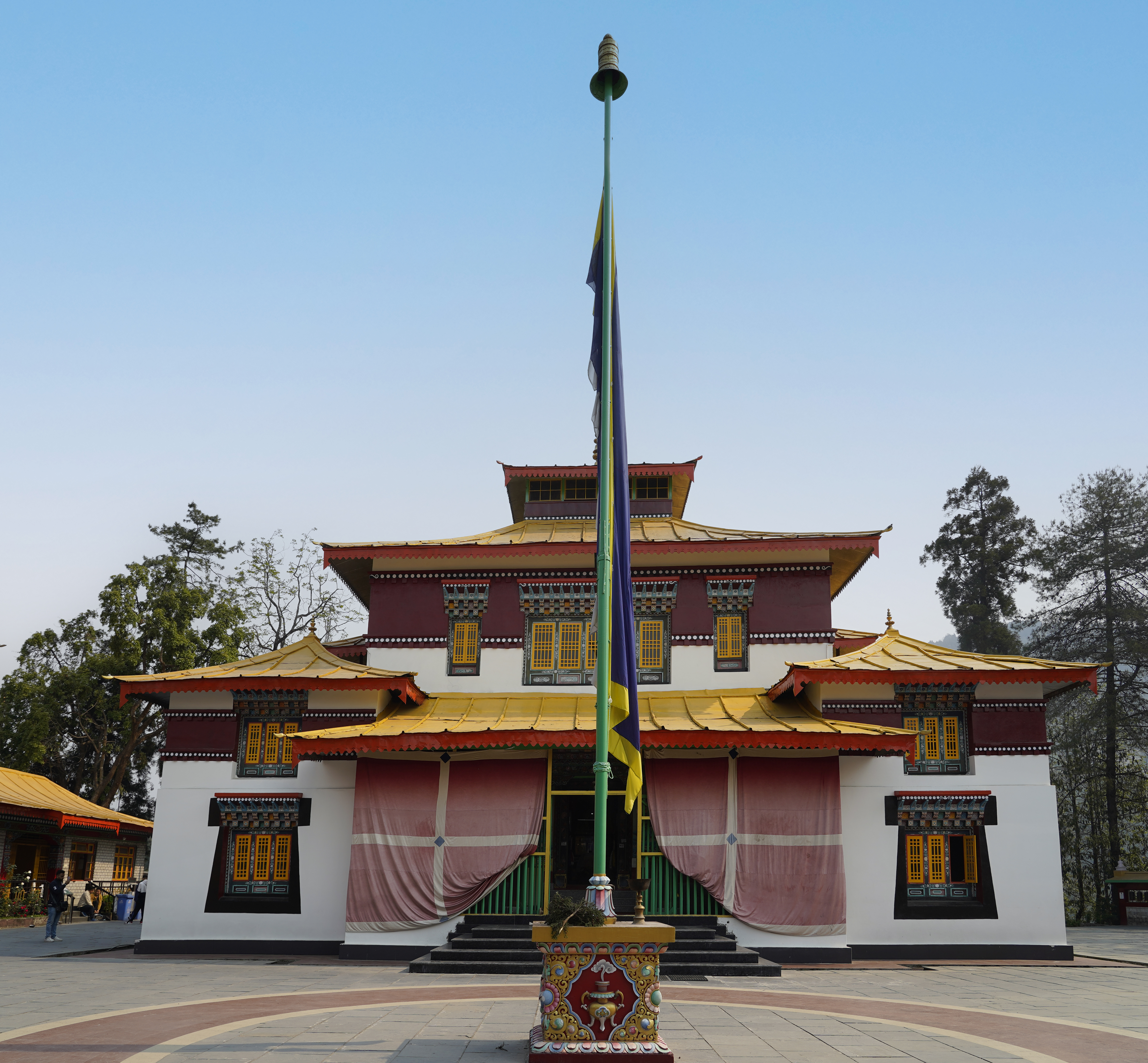
- Enchey Monastery

- Location within India

Religion
- Affiliation: Tibetan Buddhism
- Sect: Nyingma
- Festivals: Chaam Dance, Singhe Chaam, and Pang Lhabsol

Location
- Location: East Sikkim, Sikkim, India
- Country: India
- Interactive map of Enchey Monastery
- Coordinates: 27°20′9″N 88°37′9″E

Architecture
- Style: Tibetan
- Founder: Lama Druptab Karpo
- Established: 1840; 186 years ago

The Enchey Monastery was established in 1909 above Gangtok, the capital city of Sikkim in the Northeastern Indian state. It belongs to the Nyingma order of Vajrayana Buddhism. The monastery built around the then small hamlet of Gangtok became a religious centre. The location was blessed by Lama Drupthob Karpo, a renowned exponent of tantric (adept) art in Buddhism with flying powers; initially a small Gompa was established by him after he flew from Maenam Hill in South Sikkim to this site. The literal meaning of Enchey Monastery is the "Solitary Monastery". Its sacredness is attributed to the belief that Khangchendzonga and Yabdean – the protecting deities – reside in this monastery. As, according to a legend, Guru Padmasambhava had subdued the spirits of the Khangchendzonga, Yabdean and Mahākāla here. In view of this legend, the religious significance of Enchey Monastery is deeply ingrained in every household in Gangtok. It is also believed that these powerful deities always fulfil the wishes of the devotees.

== Geography ==
The monastery is built on a stunning ridge of a hill above the Gangtok city to its northeast from where the Kanchendzonga range is visible. It is located on Gangtok – Nathula road, above the Siniolochu lodge and passes through an avenue of sylvan coniferous trees, bypassing the TV telecommunications tower. It is about 3 kilometres (1.9 mi) from the northeast of the main market place in Gangtok. Even though it is a small monastery situated on a strategic peak overlooking Gangtok, compared to other monasteries in Sikkim, it provides views of the Kanchendzonga peak.

== Architecture ==
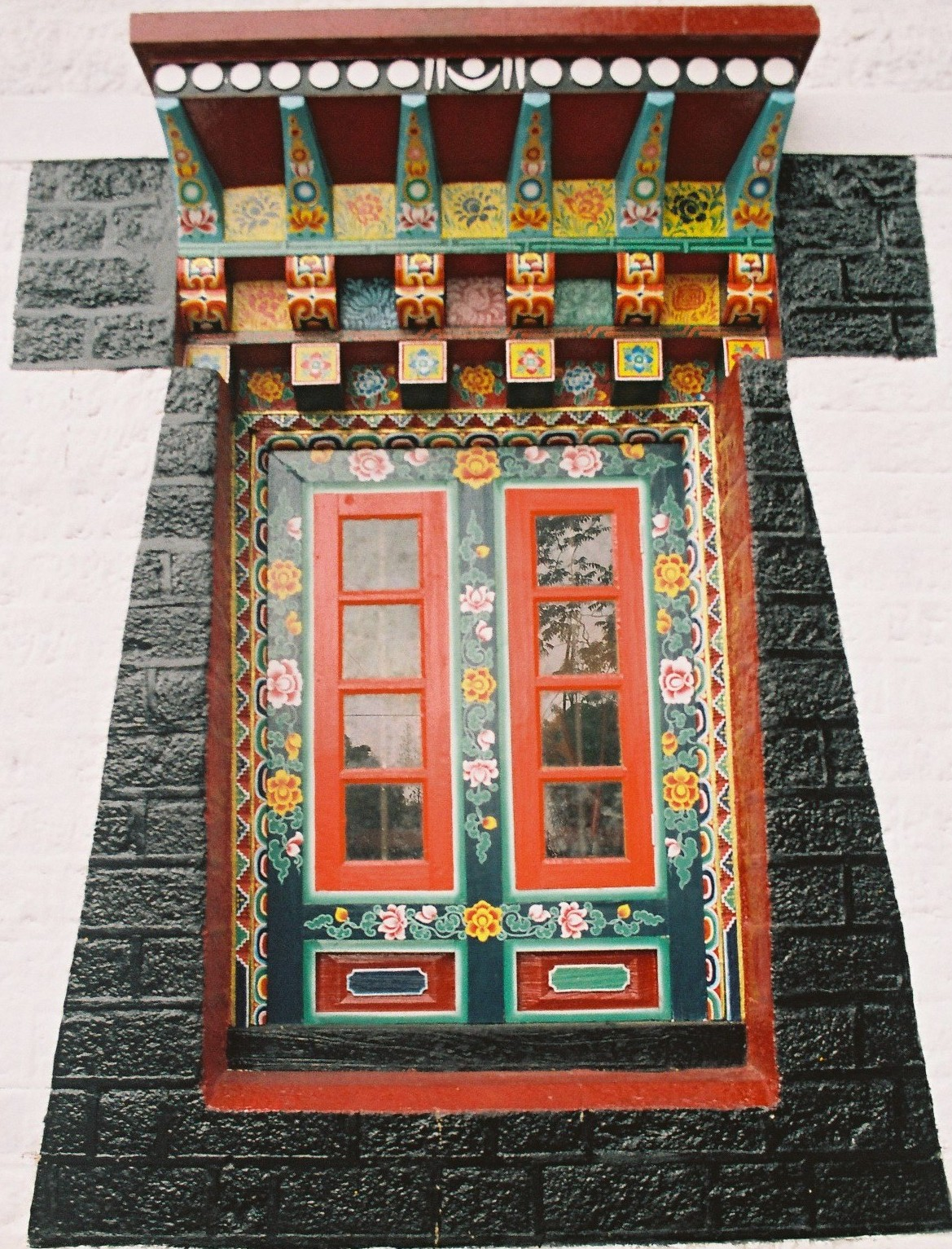
Ornately carved colourful Window of prayer hall

The monastery was first built in the 1840s by the eighth Chogyal and as a result, Gangtok as the small hamlet became a pilgrimage place. However, the monastery as seen now was aesthetically built in 1909, one of the two in Gangtok, like a Chinese Pagoda during the rule of Sikyong Tulku (1909–1910). The monastery was built at the exact location where Lama Druptub Karbo had his hermitage. The monastery is topped by a shining golden cupola. It houses a number of images of Gods, Goddesses and religious objects. The deities worshipped in the monastery are the Buddha, Loki Sharia and Guru Padmasambhava. The walls of the monastery in the large prayer hall are fully covered with paintings and murals of four religious kings, the deities of the four cardinal directions as stated in the scriptures and the entire galaxy of Mahayan Buddhist deities. Manuscripts of scriptures are kept in an almirah. The four pillars supporting the roof of the monastery are elaborately carved. Built under the Nyingma order, it houses 90 monks. The windows of the monastery are very ornately carved and painted.

The monastery has a large collection of masks which are used for the annual ritual dances. As its name implies, monastery has a peaceful atmosphere and also maintains a good library.

A very serene atmosphere has been created with the colourful prayer flags fluttering around the monastery. Like all other Nyingmapa monasteries in Sikkim, this monastery is also under the jurisdiction of the Pemayangtse Monastery.

The monastery was gutted in 1947. However, it was rebuilt in 1948 with the support of the devotees.

=== Earthquake damage ===
In a reconnaissance report on Sikkim Earthquake of 14 February 2006, it was noted that the Enchey Monastery, apart from other buildings in Sikkim, also suffered severe damage in the 2006 Earthquake (with the maximum intensity of shaking as VII on MSK scale); wide shear and vertical cracks were noted in masonry walls, at corners and near openings. It was not the first time that the monastery, among other masonry structures in Sikkim, was subject to damage by earthquake. Earthquake events in the 1980 and 1988 had also caused damage to the monastery but the repairs done were not adequate, as in 2006, the masonry wall of the building suffered damage again. The report has observed that "The damage seen in and around Gangtok was clearly disproportionate to the size of the earthquake, which was a moderate 5.7 on the Richter scale. This very clearly establishes the high level of seismic vulnerability of the region. Such disproportionate damage is a direct consequence of poor design and construction practices in an inadequate professional environment that is challenged by the lack of trained human resources in the state." Sikkim as a whole, and particularly masonry structures, are vulnerable to suffer damage from such severe earthquakes. Hence, it has been suggested to adopt "safer constructions through choice of appropriate construction systems, incorporation of earthquake resistant technology, use of good construction materials and their quality control, and involvement of competent manpower for design, construction and supervision."

The Enchey Monastery, a heritage structure built in stone masonry with 500 mm thick walls, is a double storied structure with timber frames making up the columns and beams in the roof and also in the flooring. Galvanised iron sheet roofing is also supported on wooden trusses. The masonry wall was damaged due to seismic shear. The decorative plaster of the walls also fell off due to cracks in the masonry walls and spoiled some of the beauty of the structure. Grouting of the cracks was suggested as a solution to strengthen the damaged portions of the walls.

== Festival ==
Detor Cham is the colourful and vibrant Cham dance festival that is held in the monastery on the 18th and 19th day of the 12th Lunar month of the Tibetan calendar, corresponding to the dates during January/February of the Gregorian calendar. Other festivals observed in the Enchey Monastery are: the Singhe Chaam performed once every three years, Pang Lhabsol commemorating the swearing of blood-brotherhood between the Bhutias and Lepchas in the presence of Khangchendzonga as witness. The Cham dances are mask dances where the dancers wearing ornate robes perform dances representing the Tibetan deity figurines of Mahakala (the protector) and mythical snow lions; both depict a third eye on their foreheads to represent the "need for inner reflection." The dance festivals are usually held prior to the Losar, the Tibetan New Year day (February/March) and Losoong, the Sikkimese New Year (December/January).

== Gallery ==
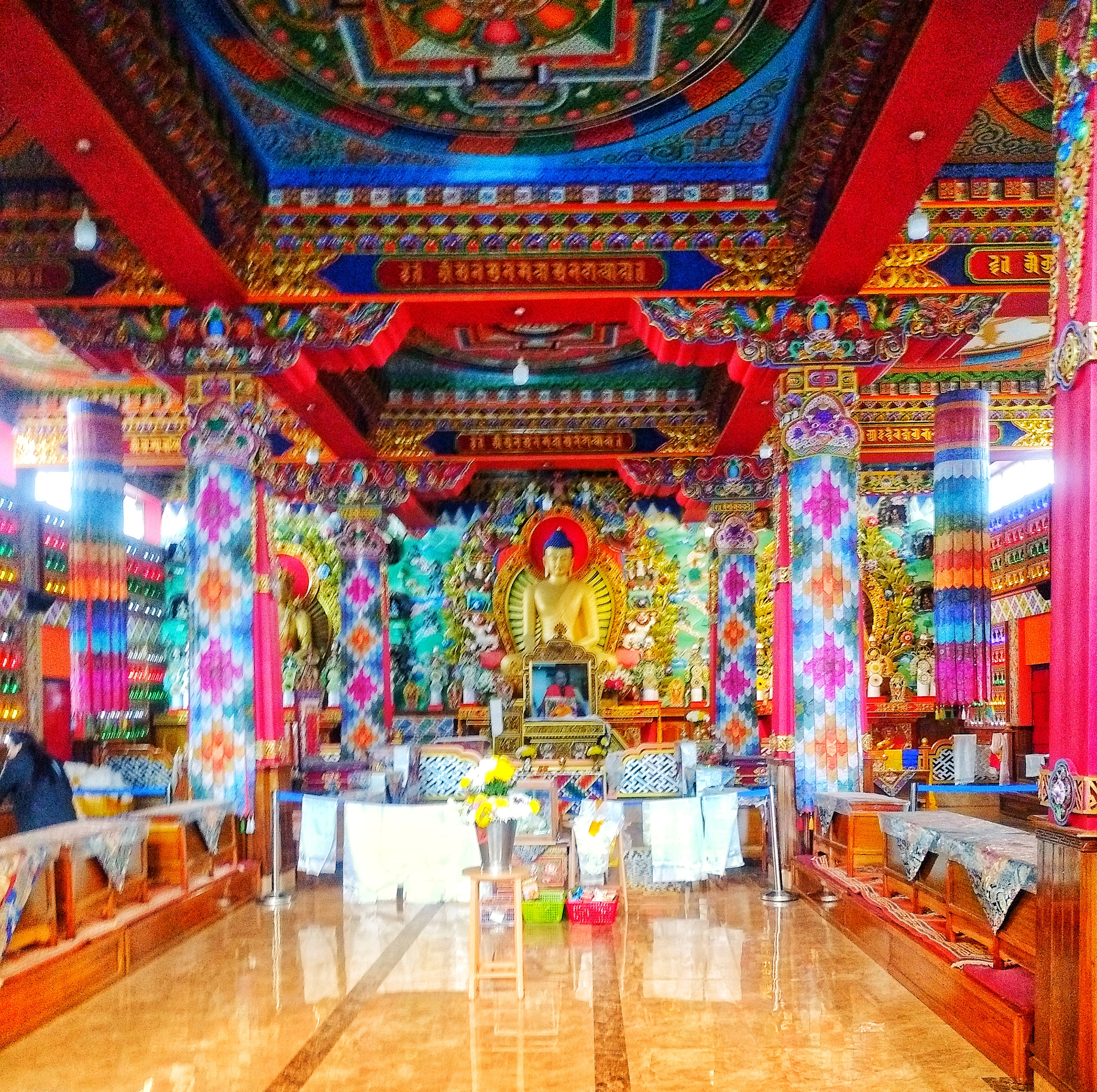
Enchey Monastery Inside View

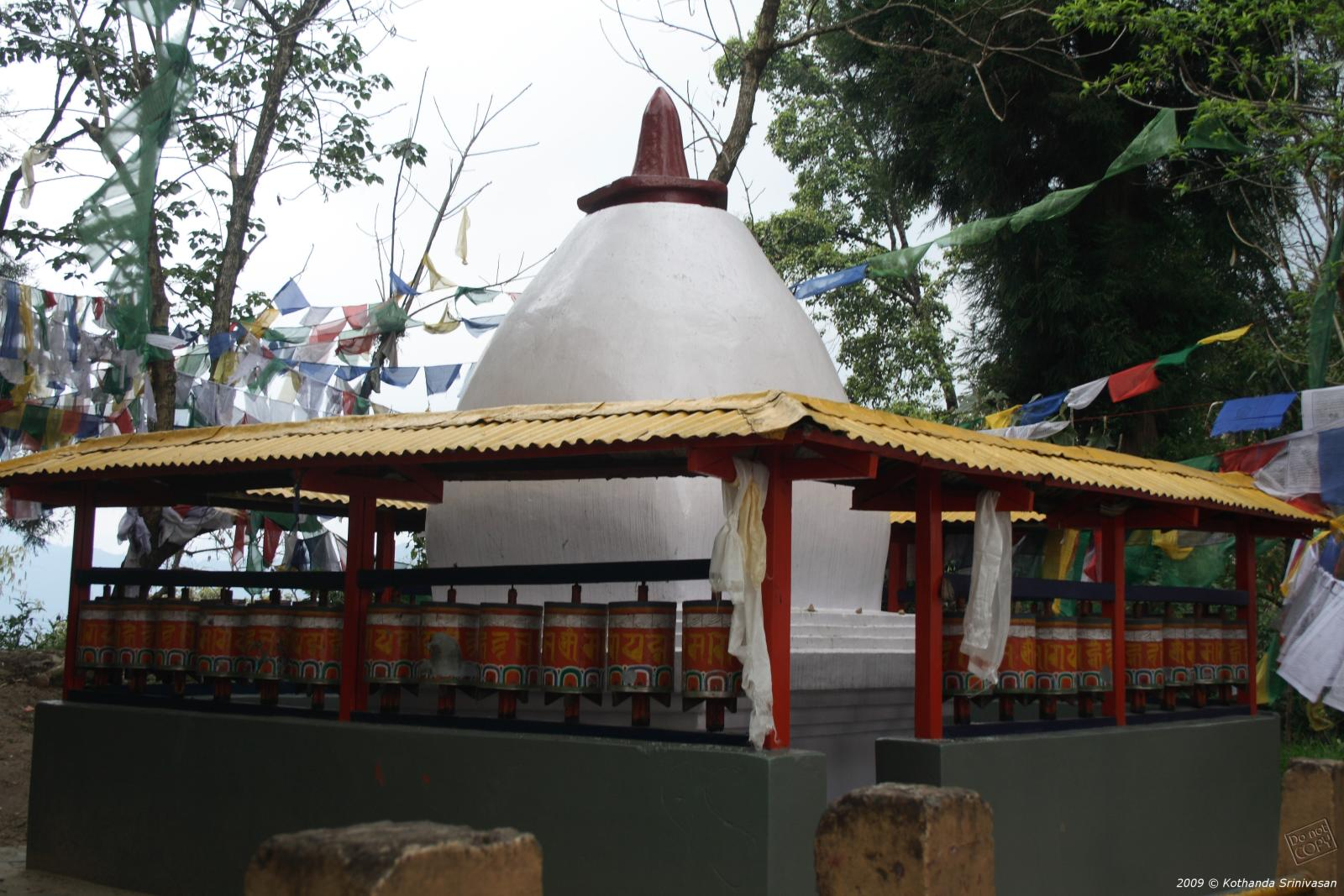
A Chorten in Enchey Monastery in Gangtok

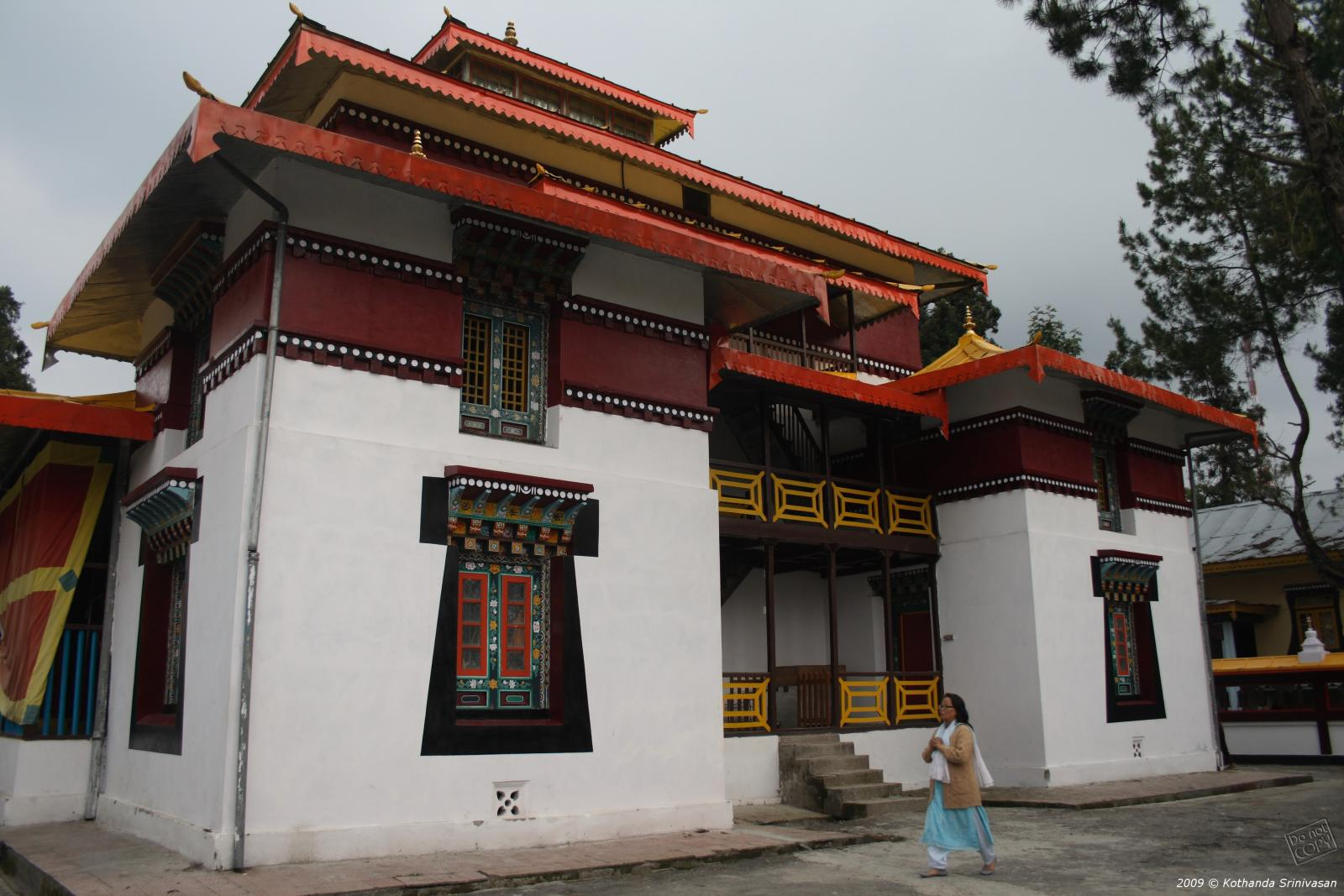
A close view of Enchey Monastery in Gangtok

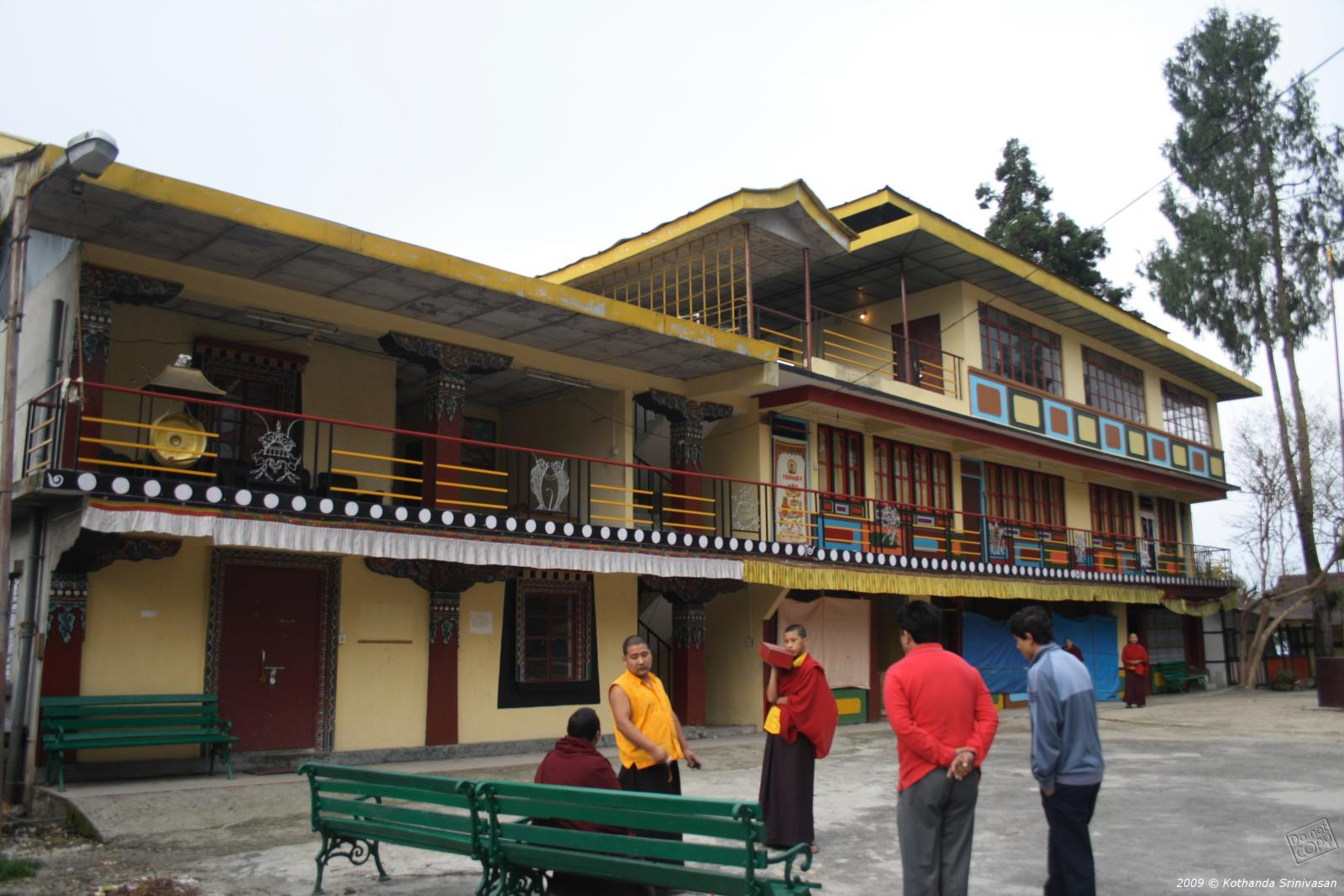
Courtyard of Enchey Monastery

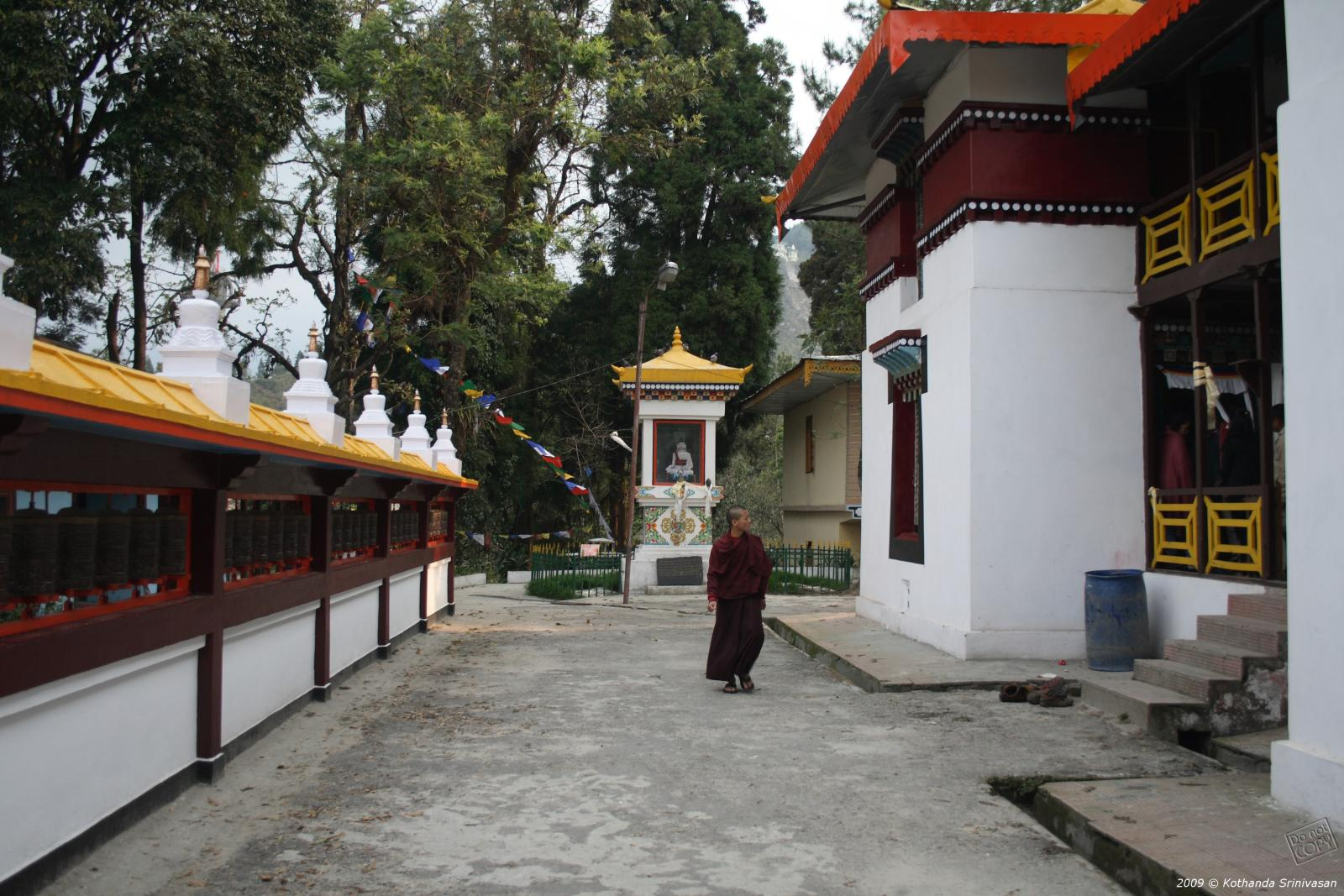
Prayer wheels in Enchey Gompa

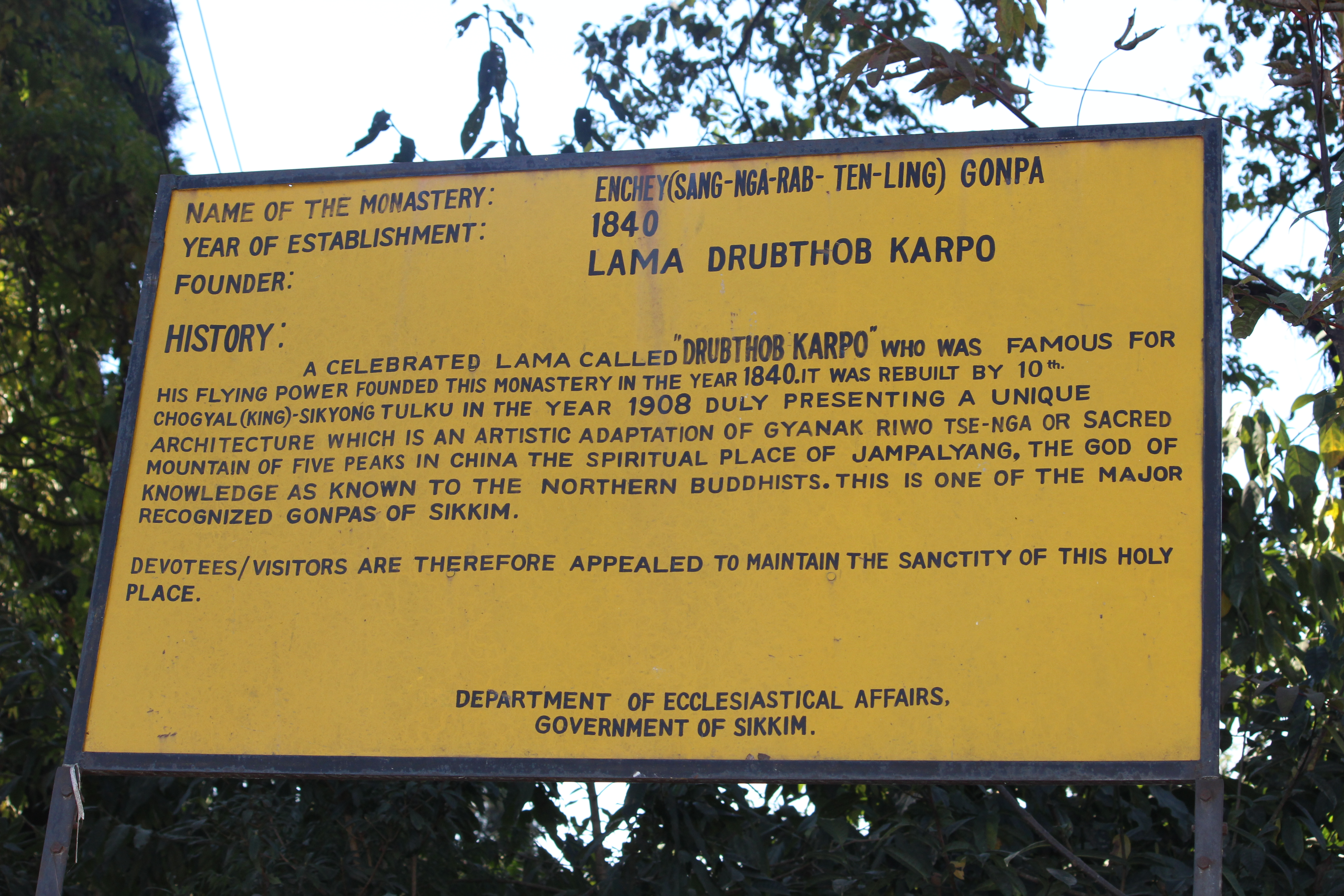
Signage in front of the Enchey Monastery in Gangtok

== See also ==
- Buddhism
- Gautama Buddha
- History of Buddhism in India
- Buddhist pilgrimage sites in India
