= Krimila =

Kṛmilā Adhiṣṭhāna कृमिला अधिष्ठान
- Location of Krimila Krimila (Bihar)
- 25.1571°N 86.0952°E
- Location: Lakhisarai district, Bihar, India
- Nearest city: Lakhisarai

History
- Built: 8th-9th century CE

Site notes
- Governing body: Archaeological Survey of India

Kṛmilā was a Buddhist religious and administrative centre located in what is now Lakhisarai district in Bihar. Spread in an area around 25–30 square kilometres, the city has a large number of historical monuments, particularly Buddhist Stupas and Hindu temples. Beglar and Cunningham explored the area and reported on the antiquity of the region in the 19th century.

It is known to contain the first hilltop Buddhist monastery in the Gangetic plains.

== History ==
The site was built sometime during the Gupta or Pāla-period in the Magadha region. The monastery at the site was known as Śrīmaddharmavihārik āryabhikṣusaṅghasya which translates as "the council of monks of Śrīmaddharma Vihāra". The monastery was mentioned by Xuanzang during his travels through the region. He also stated that the Buddha himself stayed here. Recent evidence has also led to speculation that the monastery was led by a female monk called Vijayaśrī Bhadra.
