= Durpin Hill =

Hill in Kalimpong, West Bengal, India

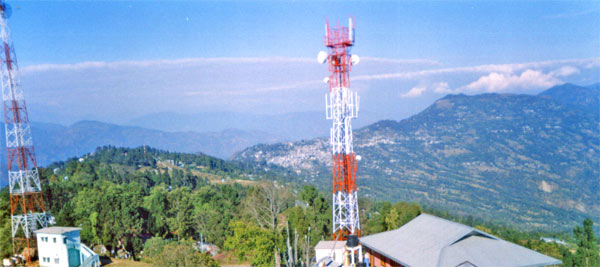
View from Durpin Dara looking Deolo and Kalimpong.

Durpin Dhara is one of the two hills (the other being Deolo Hill) connected by a ridge on which the town of Kalimpong stands. The hill is 1,372 metres (4,501 feet) above mean sea level and is located south west of the town. There are panoramic views over Kalimpong, the snow clad Himalayan ranges of West Sikkim, the Teesta River and its valleys and the Jelepla Pass. A golf course has been laid out near the summit.

Atop the hill sits the Zang Dhok Palri Monastery which was consecrated by the Dalai Lama in 1976. The monastery holds in its reliquary 108 volumes of the Kangyur, as well as other holy books and scrolls that were moved out of Tibet after the Chinese invasion.

The Indian Army has a major base atop the Durpin Hill due to its proximity to the international border. Near the monastery, a helipad has been constructed by the Indian Army.
