= Zang Dhok Palri Phodang =

Tibetan Buddhist monastery in Kalimpong, West Bengal, India

Coordinates: 27°2′17.3″N 88°27′38.8″E

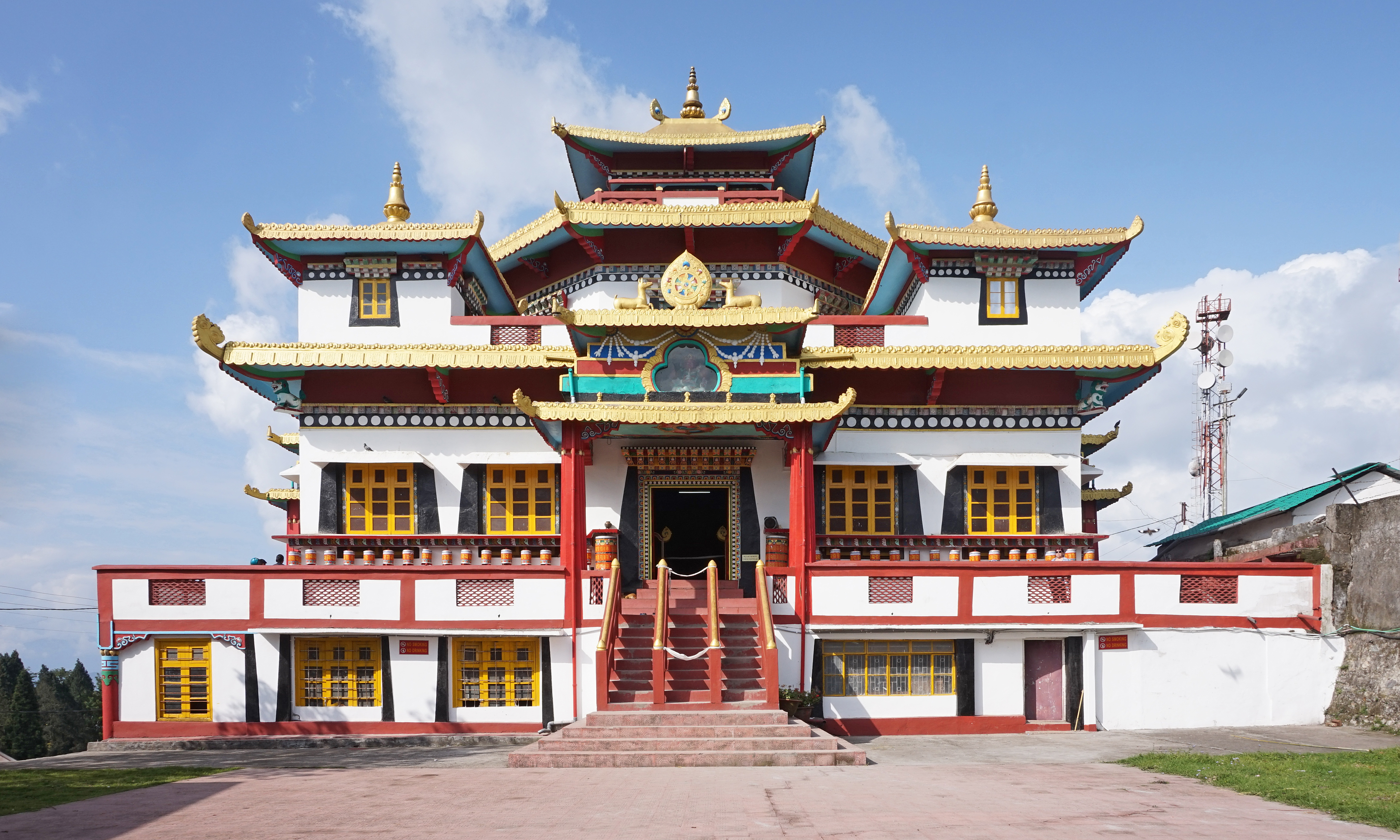
Main Building

Zangdok Palri Monastery or Zang Dhok Palri Phodang is a Tibetan Buddhist monastery of the Nyingma school, located at Kalimpong in West Bengal, India. The monastery was founded by Dudjom Rinpoche in 1957 and built where Dudjom Rinpoche settled while in exile from Tibet, atop Durpin Hill. It represents Guru Rinpoche's palace, the Glorious Copper Colored Mountain. In 1975, Dudjom Rinpoche then moved from Kalimpong to Nepal, and the monastery was additionally consecrated in 1976 by the visiting Dalai Lama.

A series of important Nyingma school lineage transmissions given by Dudjom Rinpoche to the Tibetan exile communities were first held at Zangdok Palri in 1961. The monastery houses many rare Tibetan Buddhist and specifically Nyingma lineage texts that were brought by Dudjom Rinpoche into Sikkim, India, then moved to Kalimpong after the invasion of Tibet by China in 1949/1950. It also houses the 108 volumes of the Buddhist Kangyur translated into Tibetan. It is popularly known as the Durpin Monastery.

Dudjom Rinpoche was gifted another monastery in Kalimpong, the Jangsa Dechen Choling Monastery, where he trained lamas and students. The Jangsa Gompa was built in 1692 by the government of Bhutan, when Bhutan controlled Kalimpong, and was gifted to Dudjom Rinpoche by Bhutan's Queen Mother Choying Wangmo in the 1960s.

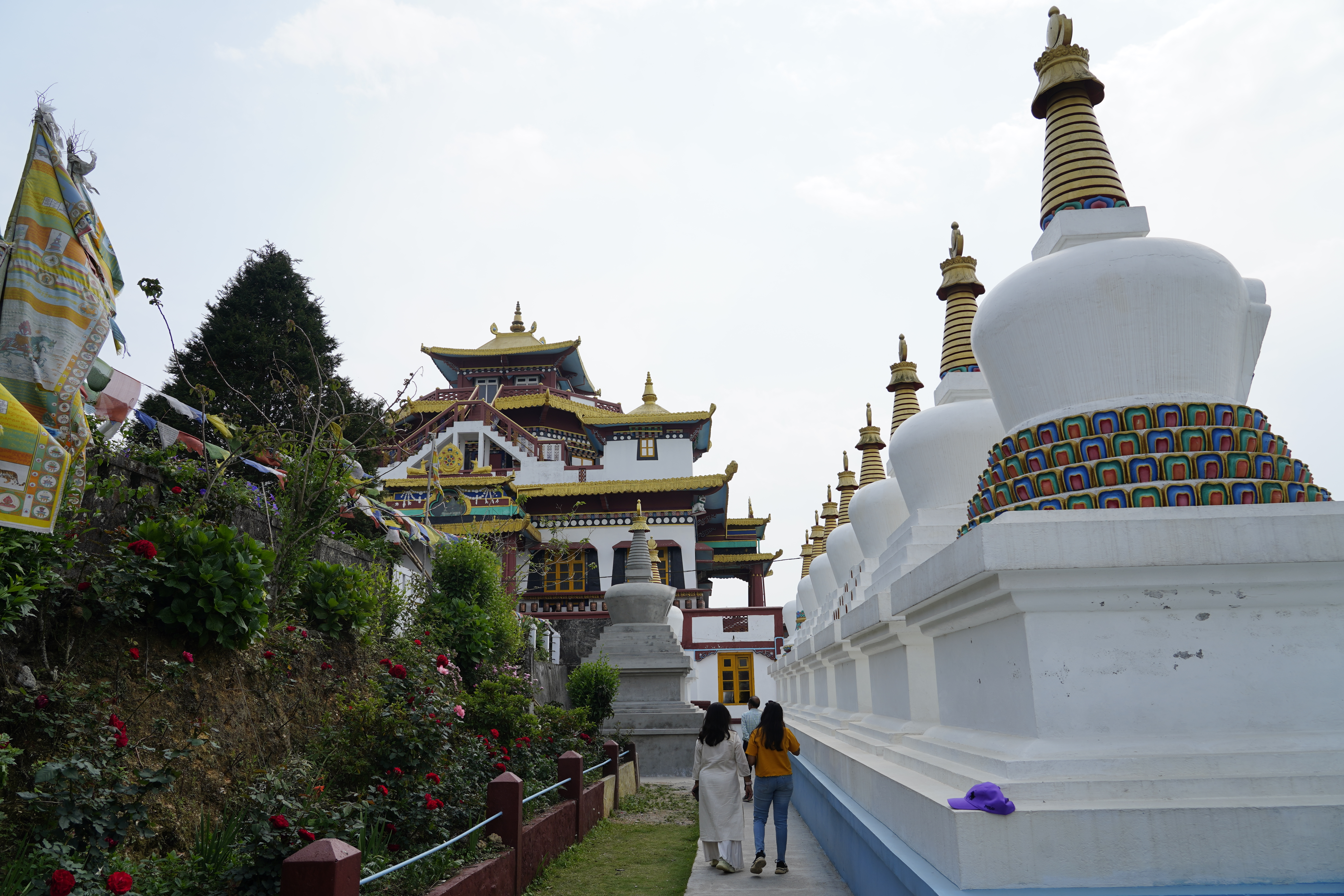
Chortens

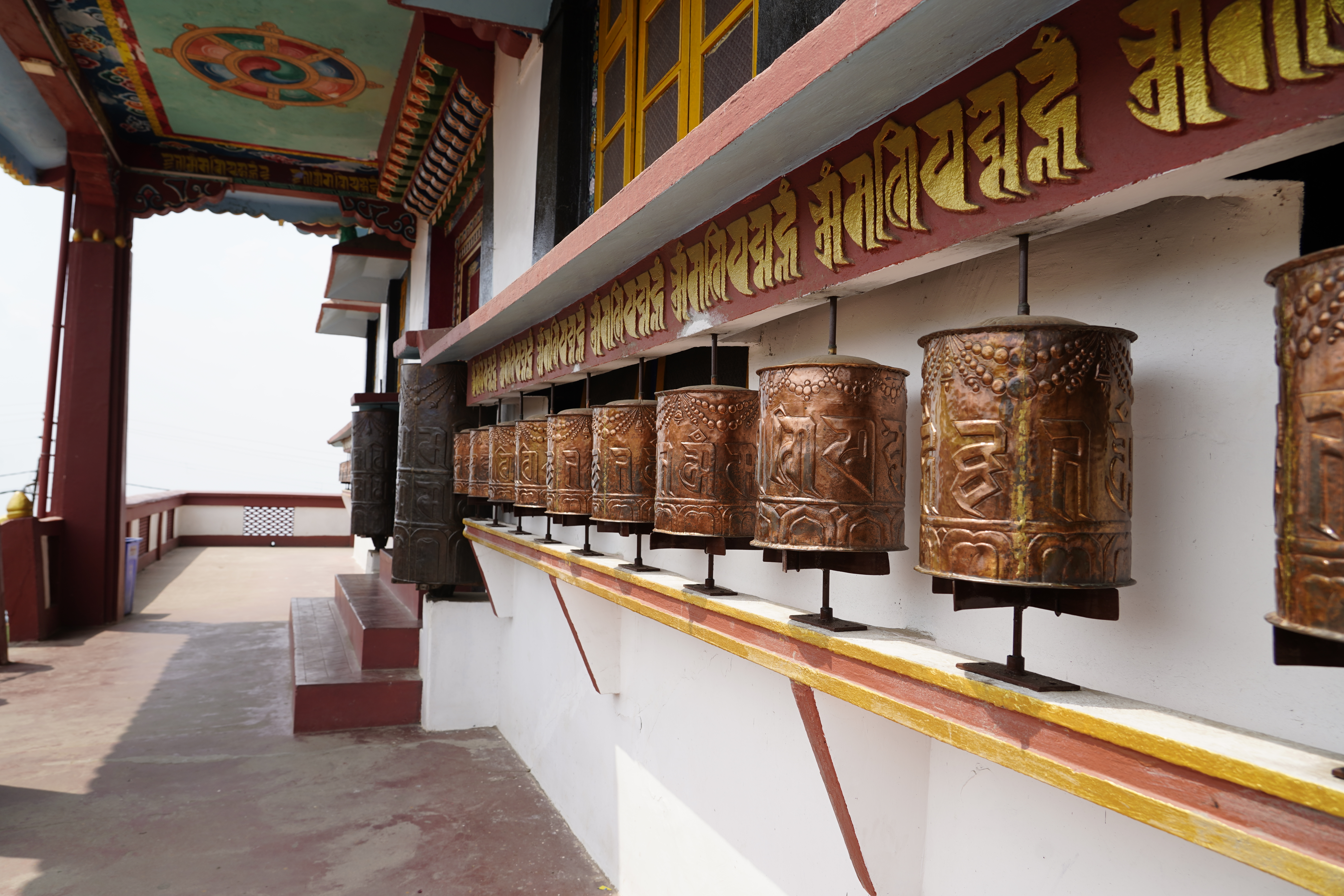
Prayer wheels

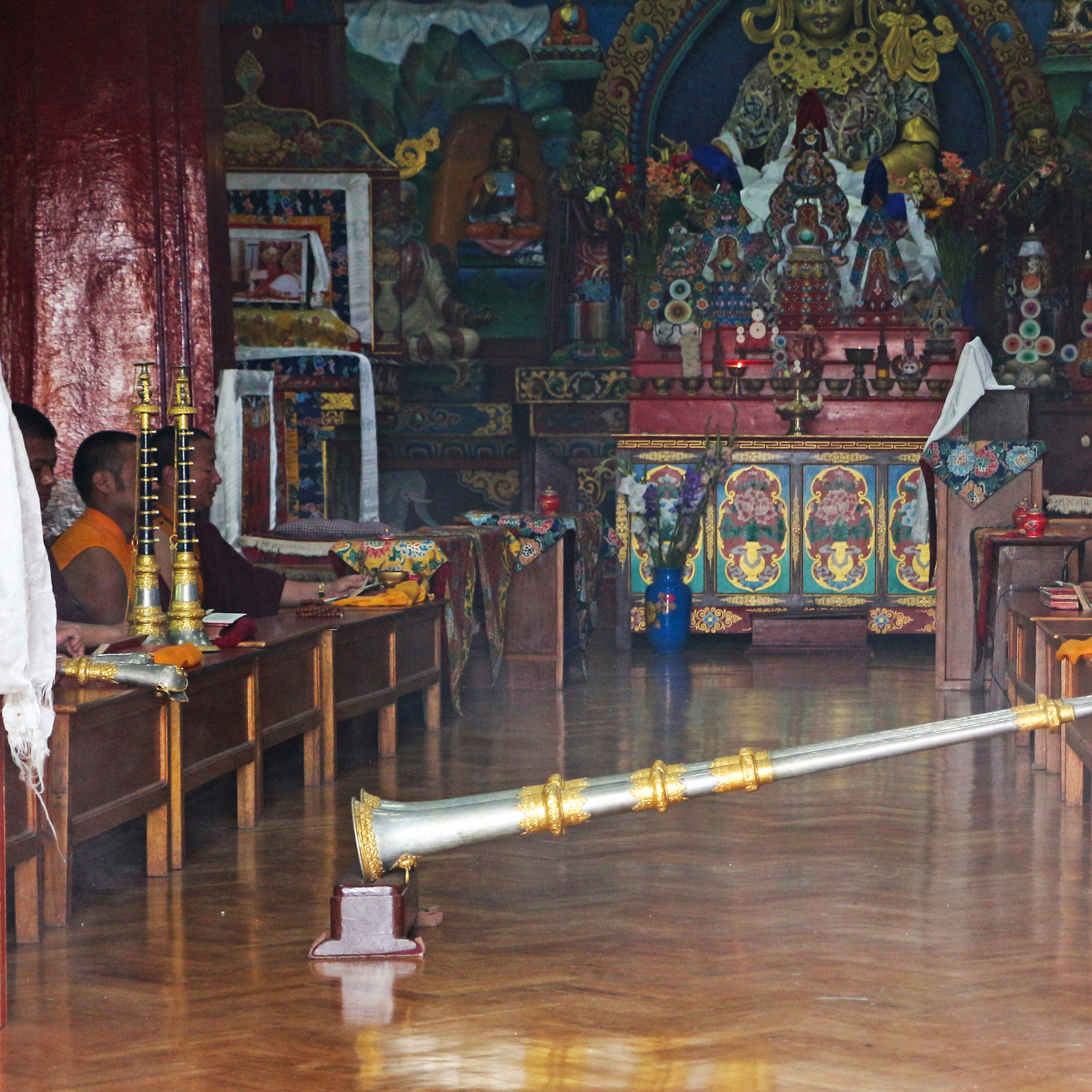
Interior

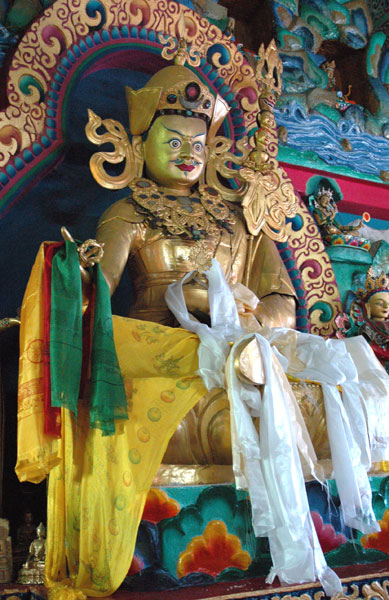
Padmasambhava
